= Gdańsk Street, Bydgoszcz =

Street in Bydgoszcz, Poland

Coordinates: 53.1611°N 18.0394°E

Gdańsk Street
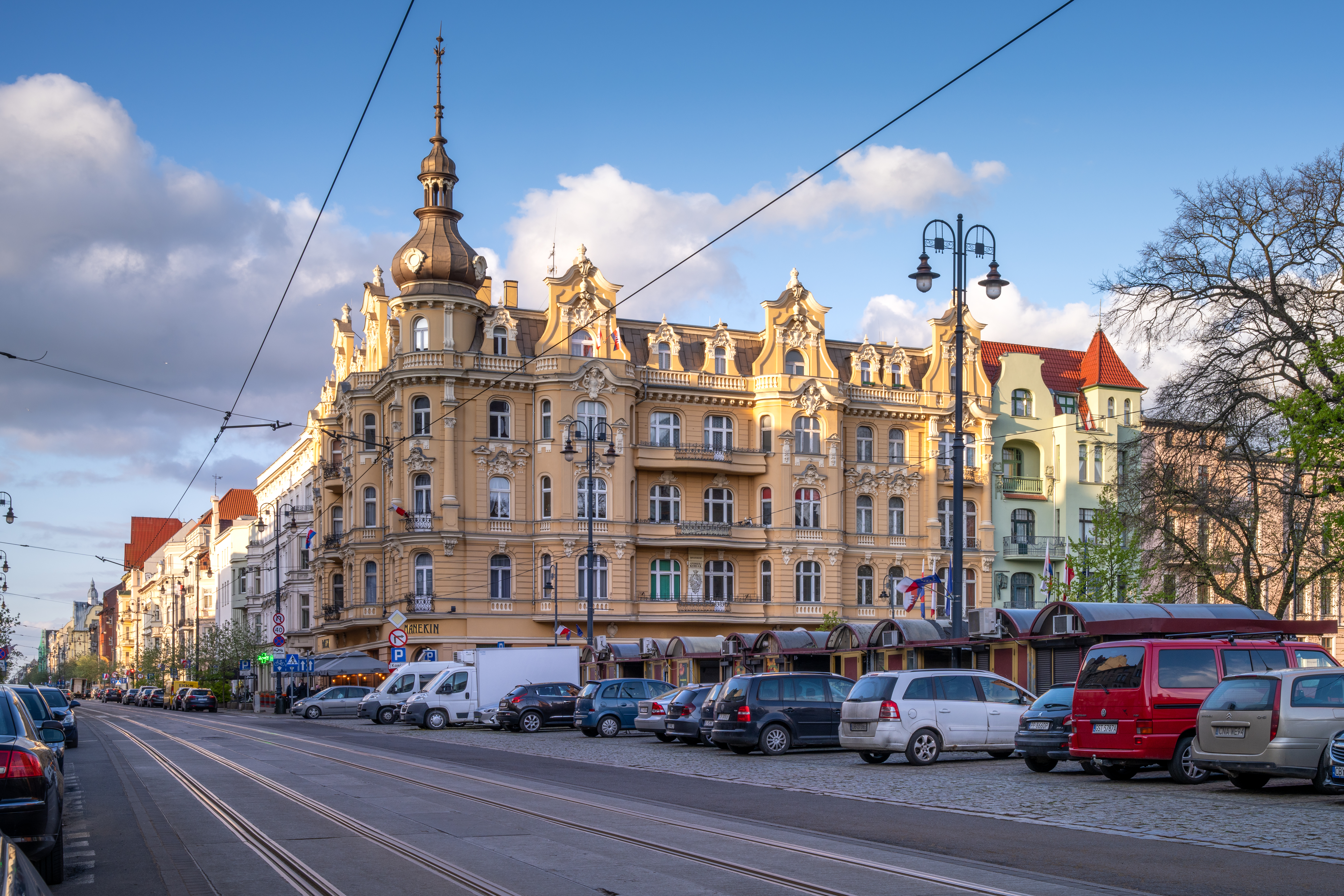
- View in the vicinity of Freedom Square

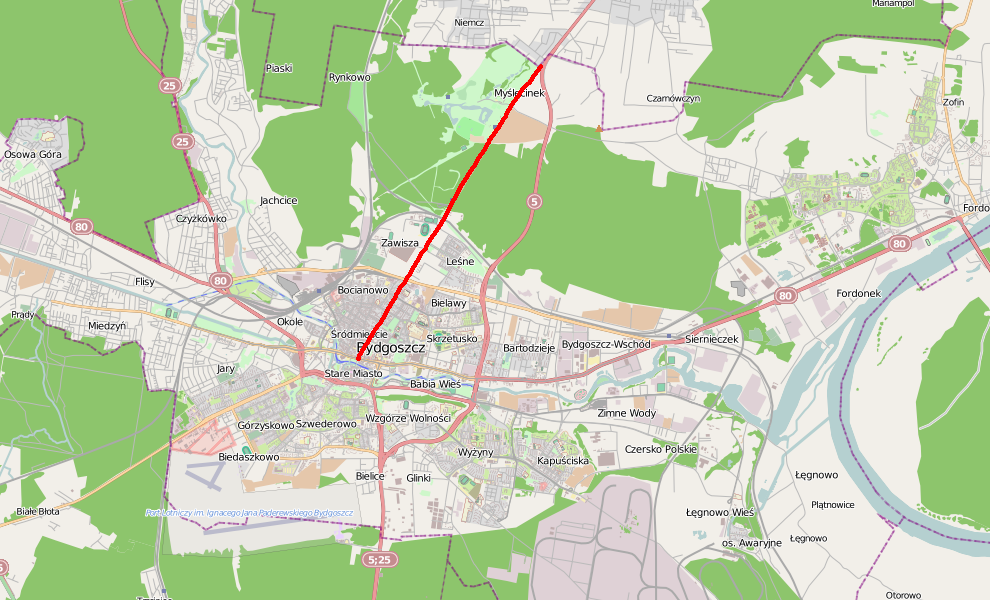
- Native name: Ulica Gdańska (Polish)
- Former name: Danzigerstraße (Danziger Chaussee) - Gdańska St. - Adolf-Hitler-Straße - Aleje 1 Maja
- Namesake: Gdańsk
- Owner: City of Bydgoszcz
- Length: 7.3 km (4.5 mi)
- Width: 26 m (85 ft)
- Area: Downtown Bydgoszcz
- Location: Bydgoszcz, Poland
- SW end: Theatre square
- NE end: Armii Krajowej Street

Gdańsk Street is one of the main streets of downtown Bydgoszcz, Poland. Initially, the street was a thoroughfare, but in the second half of the 19th century, it was designated as residential. It ran from the Brda river to the northern part of Bydgoszcz and has gradually become the city's center of trade and entertainment. During the interwar period, Gdańsk Street was the third longest street in Bydgoszcz, with a total length of 3.19 km.

The street connects the Old Town Road with the northern areas of Bydgoszcz's agglomeration. The southern part is the real "vertebrate column" of Bydgoszcz's downtown and the most architecturally representative, while the northern part – from the Municipal Stadium to the southern boundaries of the city – is bordered by the Forest Park of Culture and Leisure and the Gdańsk Forest. Gdańsk Street is rich architecturally and has many buildings that are registered on the Kuyavian-Pomeranian Voivodeship Heritage list.

== History ==
Gdańsk Street was laid in the 1820s, following the old route leading to Gdańsk (parallel to Pomorska Street). The creation of the street is associated with the expansion of the city to the north, which happened after 1816, when the city bought the land east of the route to Gdańsk. The thoroughfare has been designed as a straight line, 26 meters (85 ft) wide: the land on both sides was then divided into plots, which became the property of individuals. At the beginning, suburbs were limited to the area delimited by the Jerzy Sulima-Kamiński Bridge, Gdańsk Gates, Carmelite Church (now Theatre Square) and the Old Church of the Holy Spirit (now Poor Clares' Church). The area was used by townspeople from downtown Bydgoszcz for their annual shooting competition, awarded by the "Golden Hen" badge". The first intersection in Gdańsk Street – with Dworcowa Street and Pomorska Street – is located at the medieval road fork leading to Koronowo.

The pace of urban center development to the north-west has increased from 1850 onwards, after the construction of Railway Main Station in the Bocianowo district, which became an area of the city. Gdańsk Street quickly became the central representative thoroughfare and developed as a new city (German: Neue Stadt).

Inextricably linked with the development of the street was the construction of cross and parallel streets, enabling Gdańsk Street to connect to the downtown district (on the other side of the Brda River), the Bocianowo district to the west, and Grodztwo, Bielawy and Forest ((in Polish) Leśne) districts to the east. This network of adjacent streets was created between 1850 and the early years of the 20th century. The only surviving lattice of the old streets, dating back to the Middle Ages, consists of Focha, Jagiellońska, Dworcowa and Pomorska streets.

Important milestones in the evolution of Gdańsk Street were the setting up of Freedom Square (German: Weltzienplatz, Polish: Plac Wolności) in 1854, and Adam Mickiewicz Alley in 1903, since they particularly influenced sections of Gdańsk Street in these areas. Many landmarks on Freedom Square have been established consecutively: in 1876 the Evangelical parish church; in 1893 an equestrian statue of Kaiser Wilhelm I; and in 1904 a monumental fountain. After 1854, in the western part of the street between Artyleryjska street and Powstańców Warszawy street, was created as a training and shooting area, which resulted in the development of the so-called "Barracks area". In 1861, the newly built Warsaw-Bydgoszcz railway line crossed Gdańsk Street at Artyleryjska street, cutting off those military areas and putting a provisional end to the northern extension. It was only in the 1930s, after a level crossing had been established, that further developments towards Forest district could resume.

The attractiveness of the street declined after World War II. After 1996, a gradual revitalization began. In 1998, initial sections of the street (from downtown to Freedom Square) had their car traffic significantly reduced. In 2002–2007, a modernization of the pavement was performed, as well as roads and streetcar railways, and stylish lighting was installed. Continuous work is also underway to restore buildings facades and interiors. In 2005 and 2006, two sculptures by Michał Kubiak were unveiled: "The Wanderer" and "Marian Rejewski on a bench".

== Naming ==
Since Gdańsk Street was formed in two steps, it originally had two names. Its primary section – from Brda river to Dworcowa street – dating back to the 14th century, was called Gdańsk Street (German: Danziger Straße), while the extension that started in 1820 was named Road of Gdańsk (Polish: Szosa Gdańska, German: Danziger Chaussee). Later, with urban development, Gdańsk Street was the denomination of subsequent extensions (in 1879 it stretched to Warsaw Uprising street intersection). In 1977, the street reached its current administrative length and borders, and therefore "Gdańsk Street" indicates now the road leading from Bydgoszcz Old Town up to the northern boundary of the city.

Successive names of the street in its historic section are as follows:* 1820-1920 – Danziger Straße / Danziger Chaussee; 1920–1939 – Gdańsk Street; 1939–1945 – Adolf-Hitler-Straße; 1945–1990 – 1 May Avenue, and since 1990 – Gdańsk Street.

== Tract division ==
Once Gdańsk Street was established, the land situated on both sides was divided into plots and sold to individuals. Most of the plots all the way to Świętojańskia street, have been drawn around the 1850s, and their limits are still the same today. The parcelling process of properties on Gdańsk Street and their numbering was finally completed in February 1931, followed by the administrative imposition for even-numbered (eastern side) and odd ones (on the west). Between 1879 and 1931, 169 numbers were registered and since 1931, 190 are in use in total. Following adjustments were related to the further development of the street to the north, especially on the eastern side. Currently, the highest administrative number is 260, corresponding to the Forest district ("Myślęcinek") area.

== Development of buildings and means of communication ==
The origins of the construction of the road dates back to 1448, when the buildings of the Old Church and Hospital of the Holy Spirit (now Poor Clares' Church) were erected just on the immediate northern side of the river. In 1615, the Church of Rome took over the Order of Saint Clare, which had a significant impact on the Poor Clares' Church architecture: until the mid-17th century, the building was redesigned in the late Gothic - Renaissance style and the monastery's cloister connected with the temple. At the end of the 18th century, there were several residential buildings along Gdańsk Street: in addition to the Church, an inn was standing at the crossroads with the road to Koronowo and Świecie. In 1816, Gliszczyński family established another inn at the location of the current Hotel "Pod Orlem".

The rapid development of building frontage along the entire length of Gdańsk Street took place after 1835. Around 1860, edifices extended up to the crossing with Śniadeckich street, then in 1870 up to the Świętojański street; while basic, core buildings across Kamienna street – where there was a level crossing – were established in 1890.

After 1900, the first large buildings in the northern part of the street were built including: Water Supply station (1899–1900), War College building (1913–1914), along with buildings within the newly created Forest district (Polish: Osiedle Leśne) after 1933, like houses at Nr.208 to 238. In the 1950s, new buildings in Osiedle Leśne have been constructed, such as the "Zawisza" WKS sports complex.

In 1860, the street began to be illuminated with gas lanterns, which were replaced by electric lights from 1900. The street on the entire length of the road had paved surfaces, separating curbs, along with a tree line. The sidewalks were laid from granite boards. On May 18, 1888, a horse-powered tram was launched, along the so-called "Red" line (from Theatre Square to Dworcowa street) and in 1892 a second line, "Green", was launched (along the entire length of Gdańsk Street to the artillery barracks). Trams were electrified in 1896, and in 1937, in connection with the creation of the district Forest, a bus line was launched.

In 1932, with the construction of the Polish Coal Trunk-Line, a viaduct was built over the railway (named after Józef Święcicki). It was rebuilt in 1968 and 2006, and the level crossing was closed. In 1989, a viaduct was built for the tram, and a tram terminal was set up in the immediate vicinity of the Forest Park of Culture and Leisure, at the intersection with Rekreacyjna street. In 2012 the first contraflow lanes for cyclists appeared in Gdańsk Street.

== Architecture ==
The landscape of Gdańsk Street has remained unchanged for over 150 years. The lengthy construction process made the ensemble of the whole street much diversified. Adjacent houses, hence, generally come from different eras, with different scales and styles. Originally sections up to Świętojańska Street consisted mainly of tenements for rent, and further north were reserved plots for construction of grander buildings with front-gardens. Between 1890 and 1914 a significantly increased number of grandiose buildings were constructed including: nine grand habitation houses, at Nr.16, 27, 30, 34, 51, 55, 63, 62 and 95; and several reconstructed or built villas for rich industrialists and bureaucrats, like at Nr.48 & 50, with dominant architectural importance.

Until the end of the 19th century, the predominant style was Neo-Classicism: tenements were built with simple, symmetrical facades and usually modest decoration. In the last quarter of the 19th century, classicism forms were tinged with Neo-Renaissance, Neo-Gothic and Neo-Baroque elements.

Between 1885 and 1898, Bydgoszcz's architect Józef Święcicki built 21 edifices along Gdańsk Street and associated Eclecticism with different new styles; some of his projects permanently etched the street landscape with Neo-Baroque designs, such as Nr.14, 36, 63, or 1 Freedom Square. The best instance of this is Hotel Pod Orlem at 1 Gdańsk Street which is now a showcase of Bydgoszcz's architecture.

At the beginning of the 20th century, houses were built following German Historicism, pioneering architecture style. As such, specific architects possessed their own characteristics: Fritz Weidner represented the picturesque current; Rudolf Kern, the German Secession; Alfred Schleusener and Paul Sellner the early Modern Architecture.

Houses built in the 1930s in the northern part of the street followed the so-called International Style with simple cubic lumps, like Jan Kossowski's works. After World War II, building architecture was styleless, as displayed in the features from this period: Supermarket "Rywal" (1971–1973) at Nr.47 or three typical houses at Nr.23, 53 & 76. Three new edifices were erected between 1990 and 2005 in Gdańsk Street, Nr.121, 125 & 139, none of which fit into a proper style regarding the surrounding buildings.

At the eve of the 20th century, several architecturally interesting buildings, referring to Eclecticism and Art Nouveau, rose in the network of adjacent streets buildings. Such realizations can be found mainly in following places: Krasinski St., Słowacki St., Adam Mickiewicz Alley, Cieszkowski Street, Paderewski Street, Weyssenhoff Square, 20 January 1920 Street and partly in buildings around Świętojańskiego St., Zamoyskiego St. and Chodkiewicza St.

== Social Role ==
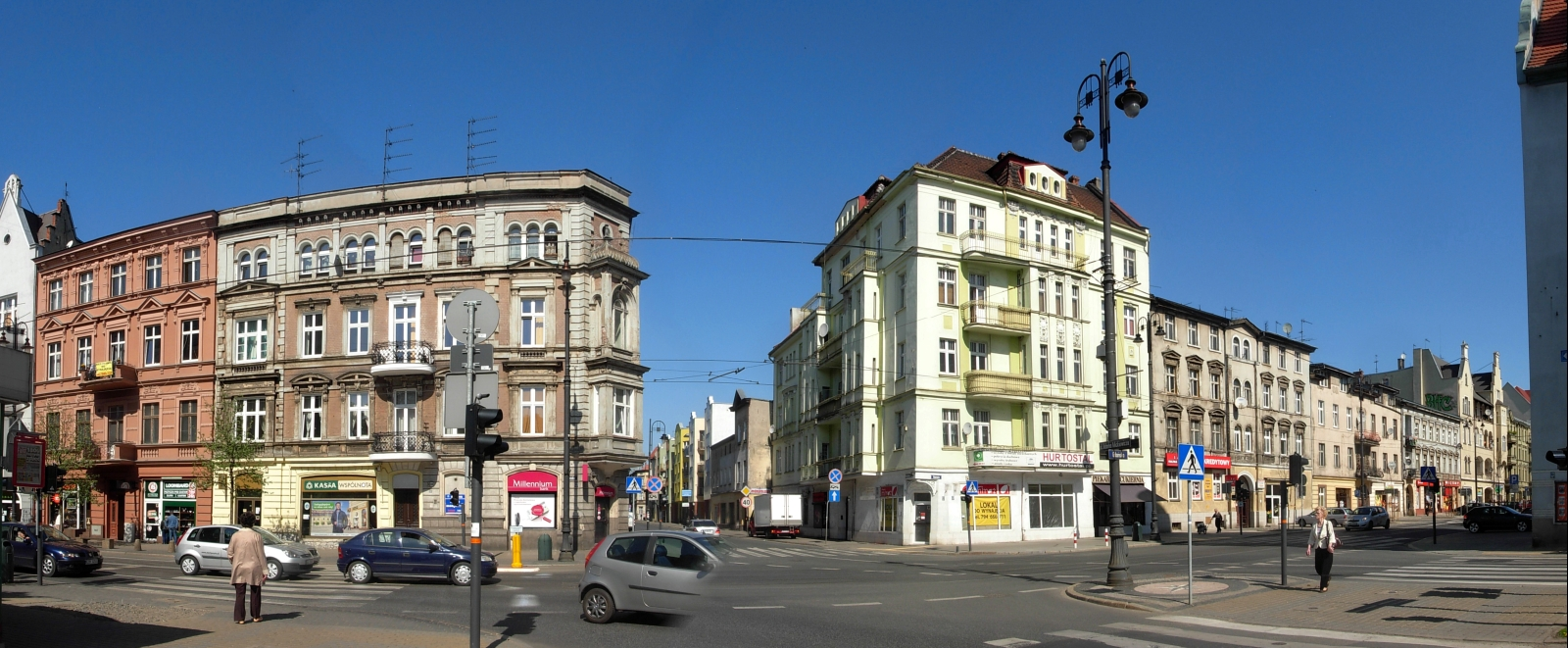
Gdańsk Street panorama, Paul Storz Tenement (left), and Otto Riedl Tenement (right)

The role of Gdańsk Street, till 1850, was principally that of a means of communication. After this date, it became a representative, bourgeois area and the expanding axis of downtown Bydgoszcz. The buildings giving onto the street have housed a mix of wealthy representative officials, manufacturers and traders of different professions, whereas craftsmen and laborers lived in the outbuildings and more modest homes. Habitation ground floors were generally designed to house commercial or catering services.

The area of Gdańsk Street soon experienced a booming trade expansion: craft workshops developed ~20 tailors and 25 shoemakers were referenced in the street at the end of the 19th century, as well as small industries and gastronomy. Nonetheless, the street did not suffer from any rapid industrialization process: very few companies (with the exception of G. Rady's factory of artistic metalwork in 1896) built typical factory buildings on this axis. The only companies operating in the area were quite modest and housed in buildings' backyards.

The shop on Gdańska street which has the longest history is the pharmacy "Under the Swan", located at Nr.5 since 1853. At the beginning of the 20th century, department stores began to appear: in 1910, Modehaus Bromberg lasted a couple of years; in 1911, Department Store "Kaufhaus Conitzer & Söhne"; in 1919, Boniface Cyrus shop. At the beginning of the 20th century, the street was also the address of the seat of five banks.

Gdańska Street also had an important role in the catering and entertainment business. During the 19th century and first half of the 20th century, it was the venue of restaurants and cafés for wealthy people, a location for modest retail shops, brasseries, as well as concert halls, hotels, theaters, and cinemas. The street also housed the first seat of Provincial and Municipal Public Library at Nr.27.

== Street Festival ==
Each September, since 2002, the "Gdańska Street Festival" ((in Polish) Święto Ulicy Gdańskiej) is the time for outdoor events, concerts and competitions held in different places and buildings along the street. The main organizer of the event is Bydgoszcz's branch of Gazeta Wyborcza.

== The street today ==
Gdańska Street is 7.3 kilometers long, with a 2 km long section of stylish houses, and 1.5 km away from the city's barracks and the forest district. In fact, the 3.8 km long stretch of road located north of the railway viaduct has a completely different character from the urbanized one, between Gdańsk forest and the Culture and Leisure Forest Park. On the northern outskirts of the city, the street climbs up the 45-meter high Fordoński rising.

Along Gdańska street one will find: three churches; four museums (District museum, Pharmacy museum, Museum of the Army and Sports museum); concert halls (Academy of Music, "Club Mózg") and the seat of Radio PIK; the oldest hotel of the city (Hotel "Pod Orlem"); one of the oldest department stores, the Department Store "Jedynak" built on the likes of Berlin and Paris department stores at the beginning of the 20th century; landscape architecture, including "Marian Rejewski on a bench" and "The Wanderer", as well as two sculptures created with dead trees Woman in pigeons at Nr.30 and As soon as we play at the intersection of Gdańska St. and Słowacki Street. A third sculpture, "The Awakening elves", can be found right in Jan Kochanowski Park near Adam Mickiewicz Alley: a modern shopping mall; the 5 villas and about 145 houses, 50 of which have richly decorated facades in styles referring to the Neo-Renaissance, Neo-Gothic, Neo-Baroque, German Historicism, Secession and Modern architecture; as well as the monumental military school building, the headquarters of Pomeranian Military District, the building that housed the NATO Training Center from 2004 to 2010 and the Inspectorate for Logistic Armed Forces; an old water supply station from 1900; a group of military barracks from the second half of the 19th century; the largest sports complex in the city; the largest leisure city park in Poland (city park "Myślęcinek"); and the Honorary Consulate of Ukraine (at Nr.76).

== Architecture ==
A walk through Gdańska Street and nearby areas gives an overview of the construction styles and trends of the last two centuries. One-storey houses (representing suburban housing type) mix with two and three story tenements (close to 100 of them), as well as urban four and five story buildings and monumental buildings. More than 90% of the buildings in Gdańska Street date back from before 1920. Half of them have been built or rebuilt in the years 1890–1914, when wealthy Bydgoszcz inhabitants took pride in architecture, fashioning different styles, from Neo-Renaissance, Neo-Gothic, Neo-Baroque, to Secession and early Modern architecture.

Buildings along Gdańska Street are realizations of Bydgoszcz/Bromberg's most prominent architects, including: Józef Święcicki (21 buildings, 20 still left); Fritz Weidner - 8 buildings; Rudolf Kern - 7 buildings; Karl Bergner - 5 buildings; Alfred Schleusener - 3 buildings; Carl Rose - 2 buildings; Paul Sellner - 2 buildings. Some of them were architects from Berlin, like Heinrich Seeling, Otto Walther or W. Hildebrandt.

In side streets, there are a large number of tenements constructed before 1914: over 30 tenements by Joseph Święcicki, 19 from Rudolf Kern, 14 from Fritz Weidner and a number of them by other builders (i.e. Karl Bergner, Paul Böhm, Erich Lindenburger).

== Monuments and main edifices ==
In 2007, 27 buildings located on Gdańska street were registered on the Pomeranian Heritage List.

The oldest preserved building is from the end of the 16th century to the beginning of the 17th century: the Church of the Poor Clares. However, the vast majority of monuments comprises stylish townhouses that were built between 1880 and 1914.

=== Poor Clares' Church at 2, corner with Jagiellońska Street ===
Registered on Kuyavian-Pomeranian Voivodeship Heritage List (Nr.601229 Reg.A/209), 31 March 1931
Built in 1582-1602 & 1618–1645.

Gothic-Renaissance-Baroque.

The oldest building in Gdańska Street, it has been used as a warehouse and a fire station during Prussian times.

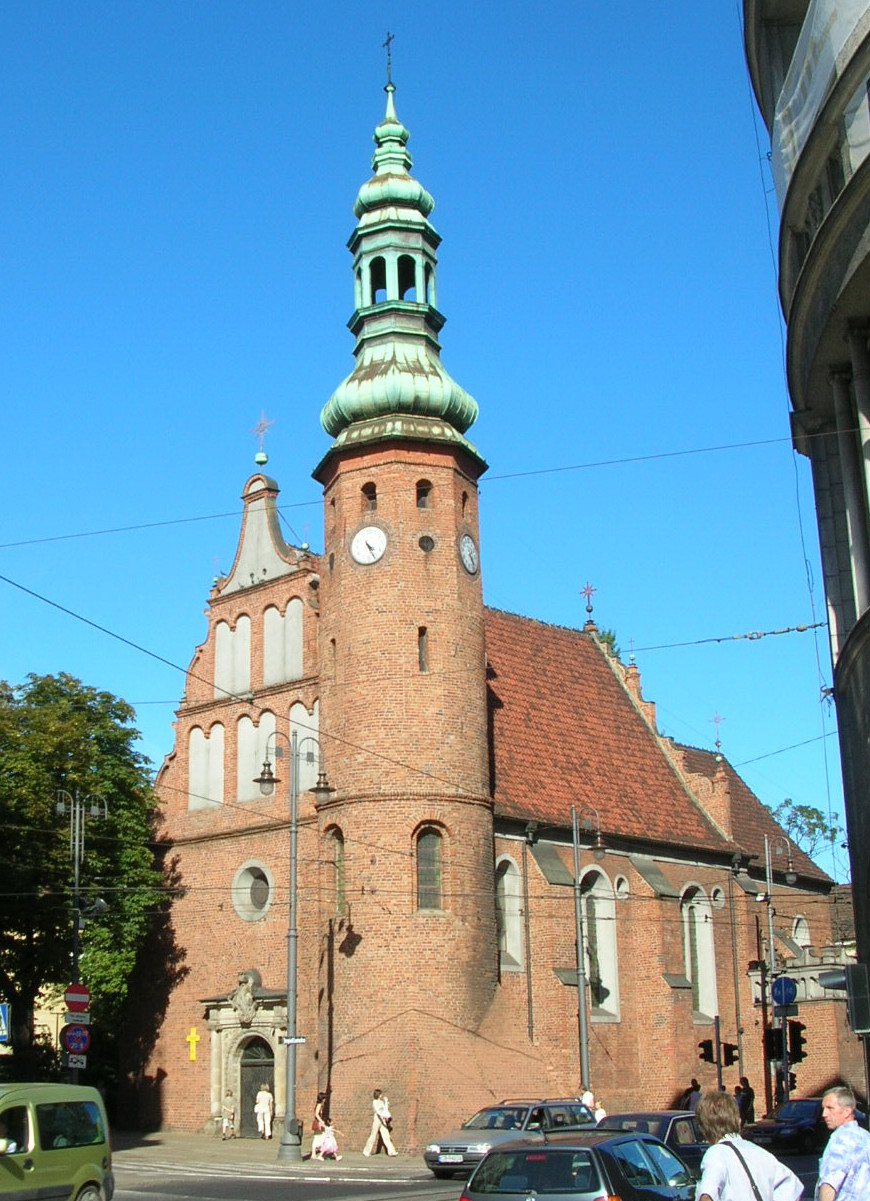
View from Theatre square

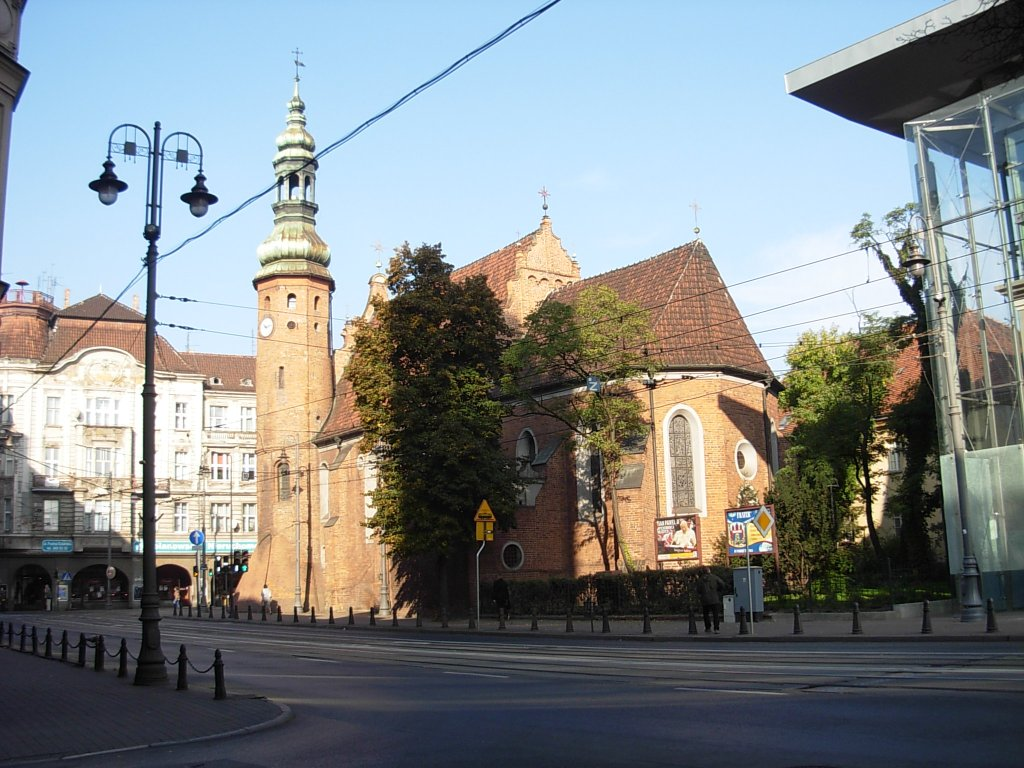
View from Jagiellońska street

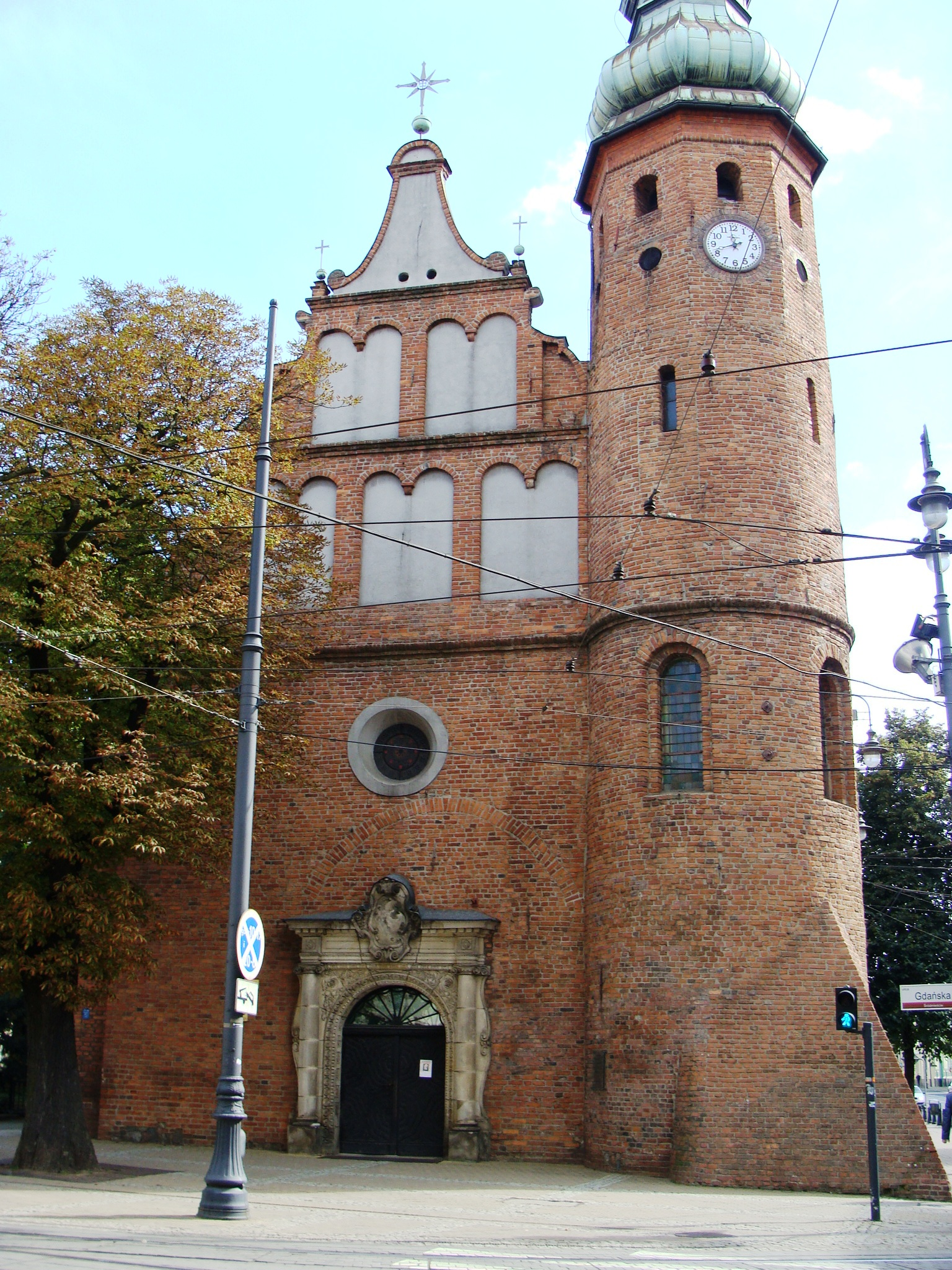
View from Gdańska Street

=== Max Zweininger Tenement, at 2 Focha Street ===
Built in 1901–1902, by Karl Bergner

Vienna Secession

The house was built for Max Zweininger, the owner of a famous hat manufactory in Bromberg, located on the square. In 1940, arcades have been added on a design by Jan Kossowski.

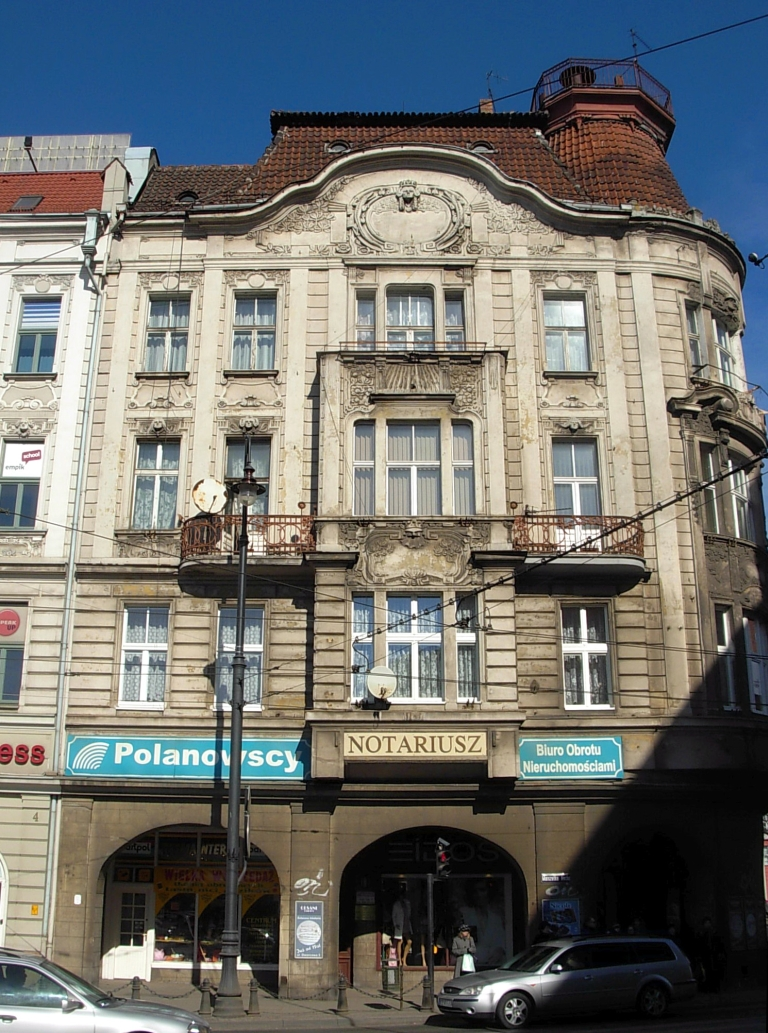
View from Theatre square

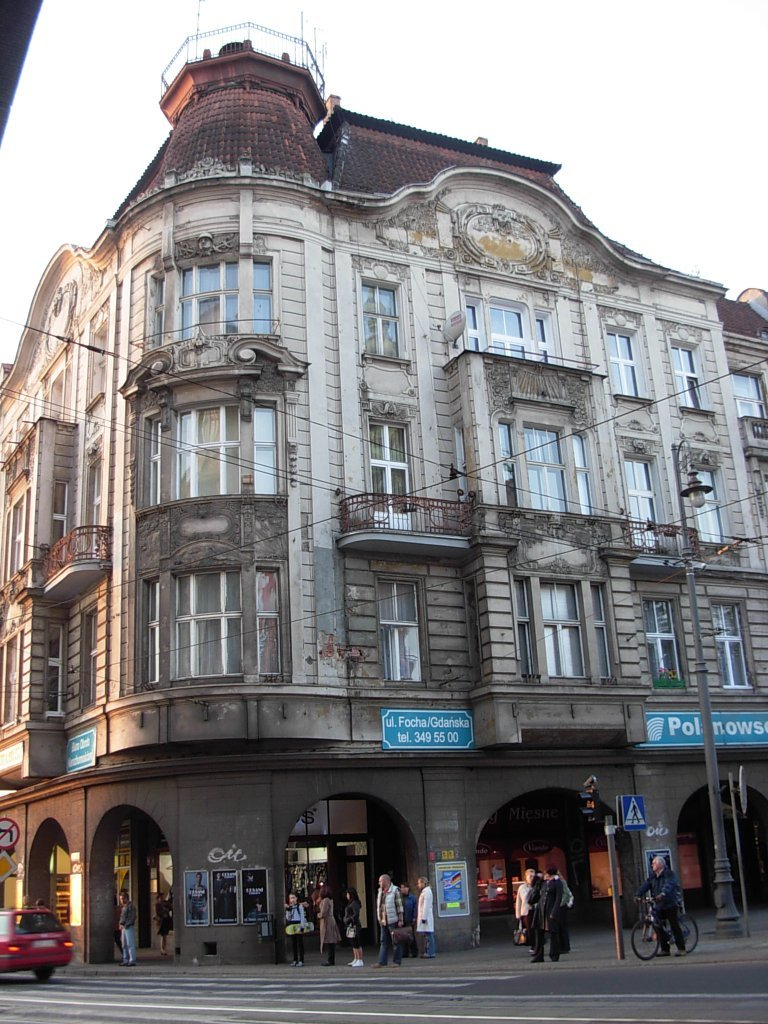
View from Jagiellońska street

=== Building of the District Museum, at 4 ===
Registered on Kuyavian-Pomeranian Voivodeship Heritage List: Nr.601230, reg.A/278, 22 January 1953 and 12 May 1993. Built in 1550–1618, then rebuilt in 1878 by Alexander Lincke.

Neo-Renaissance-Mannerism.

Originally part of the former monastery of the Poor Clares, the building has been used as a municipal hospital and has received an additional wing along the Gdańska street in 1878, with Neo-Renaissance and Mannerism styles.

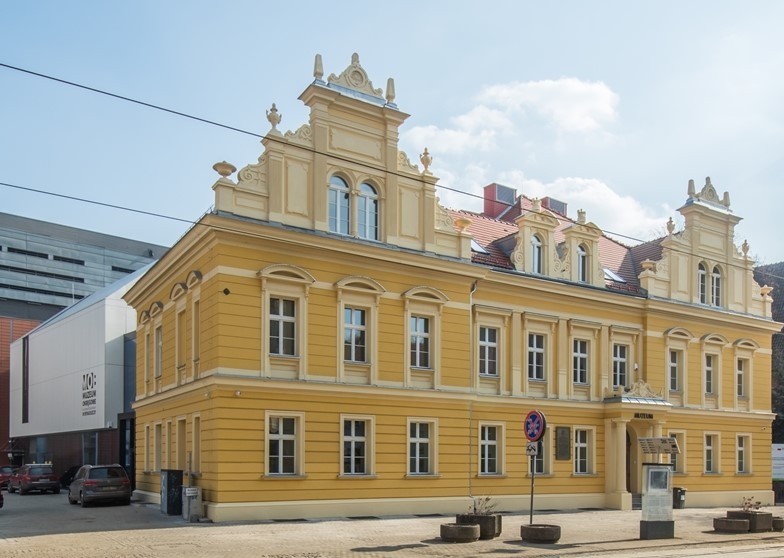
Facade onto Gdańska Street

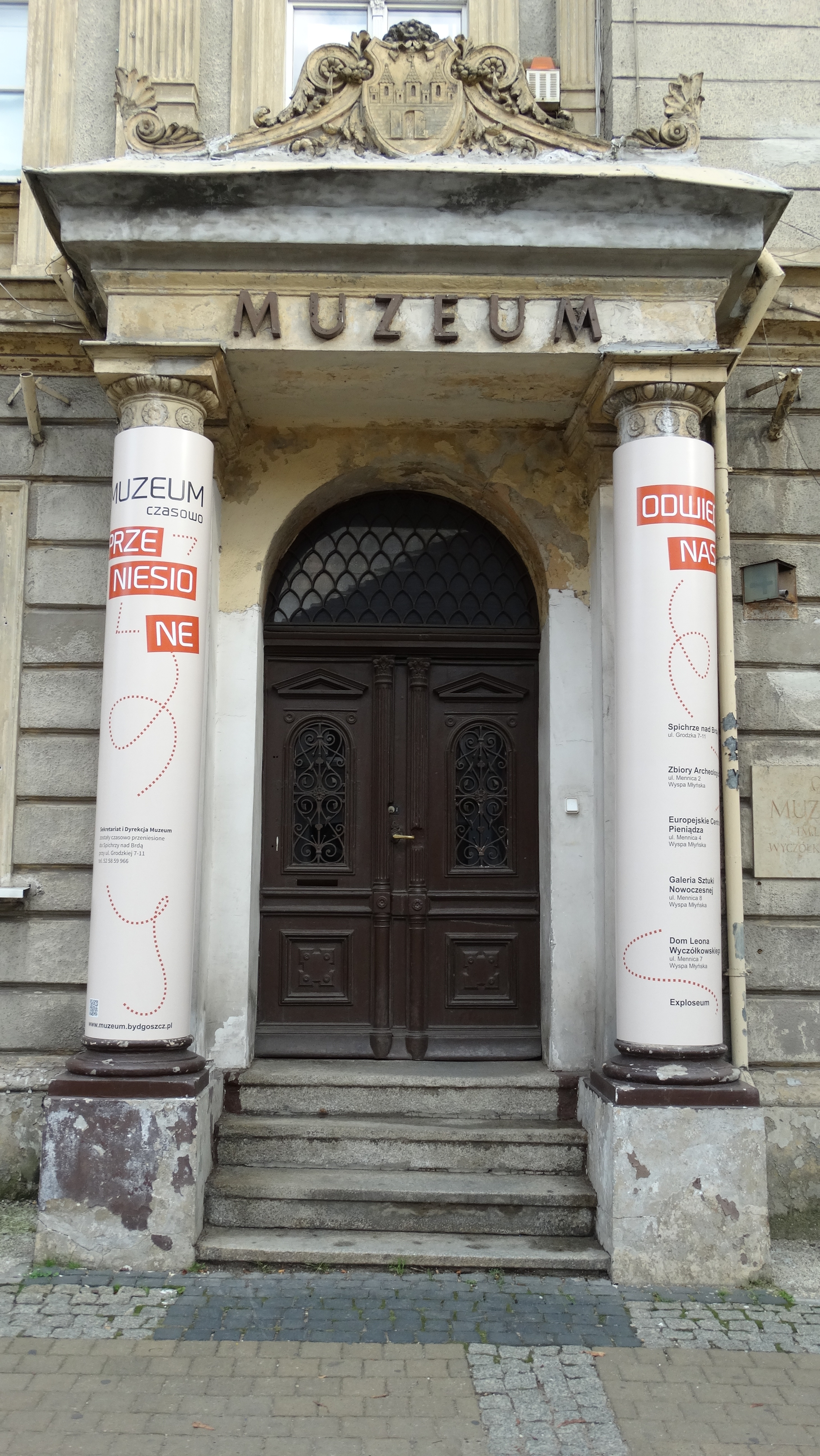
Detail of the main gate

=== August Mentzel Tenement, at 5 ===
Built in 1853-1863 and 1909 by Rudolf Kern

Vienna Secession.

The ground floor of the building still houses one of the oldest pharmacies of Bydgoszcz, "Pod Łabędziem" (Under the Swan) and a Pharmacy Museum.

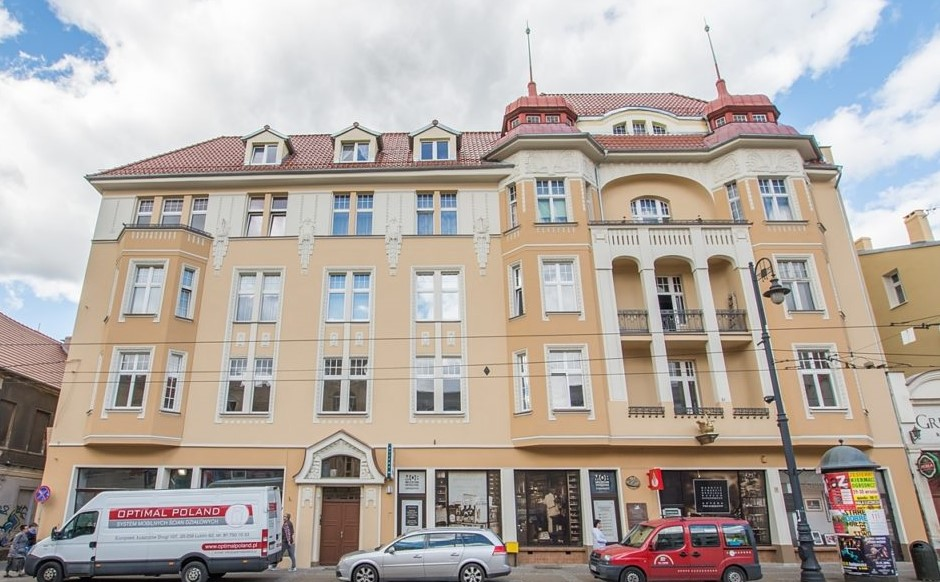
Facade onto Gdańska Street

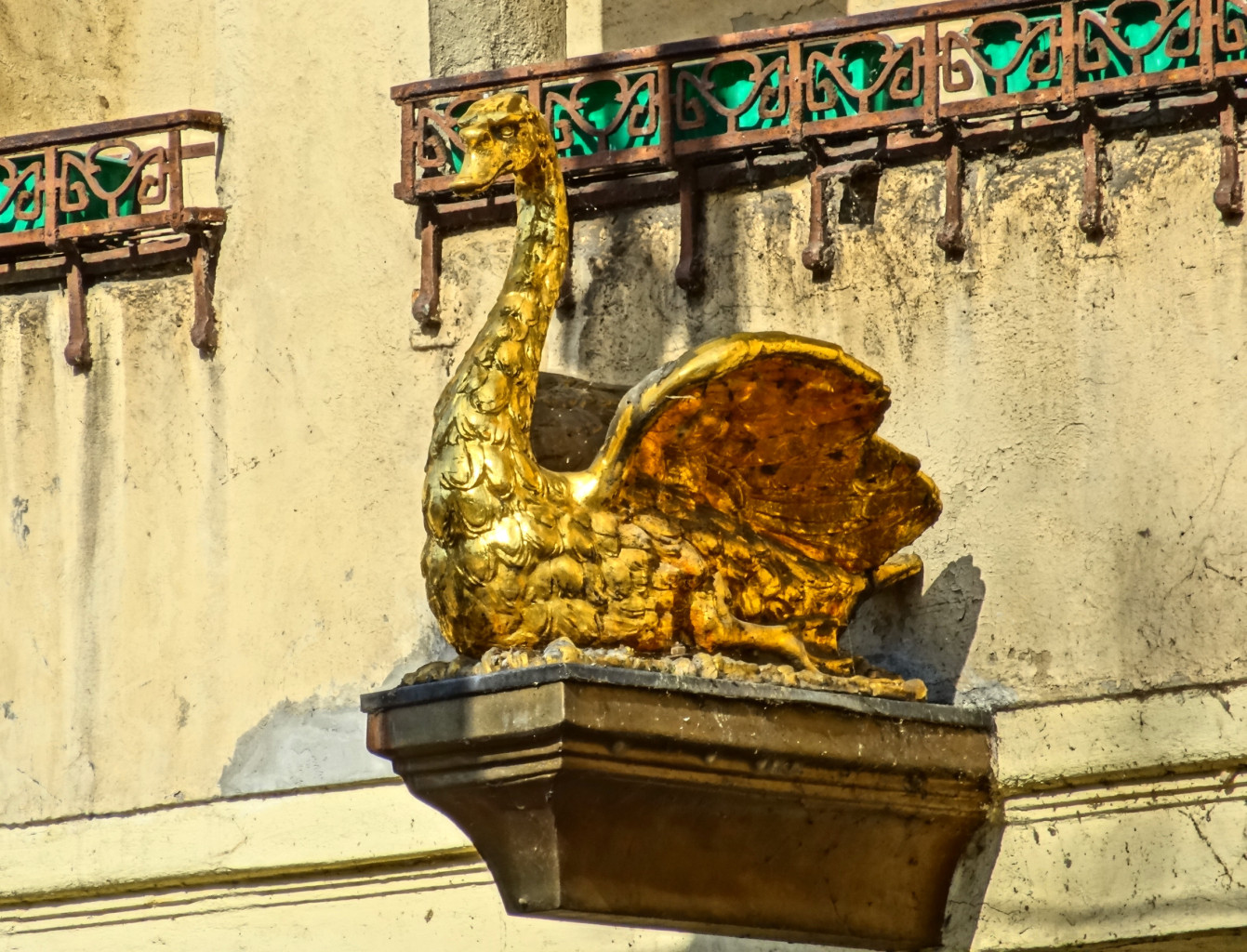
The Golden Swan signboard

=== Drukarnia" shopping mall, at 6/8 ===
Built in 2007, by JSK Architects

Modern Architecture

At this location is present one of the biggest print houses in Poland.

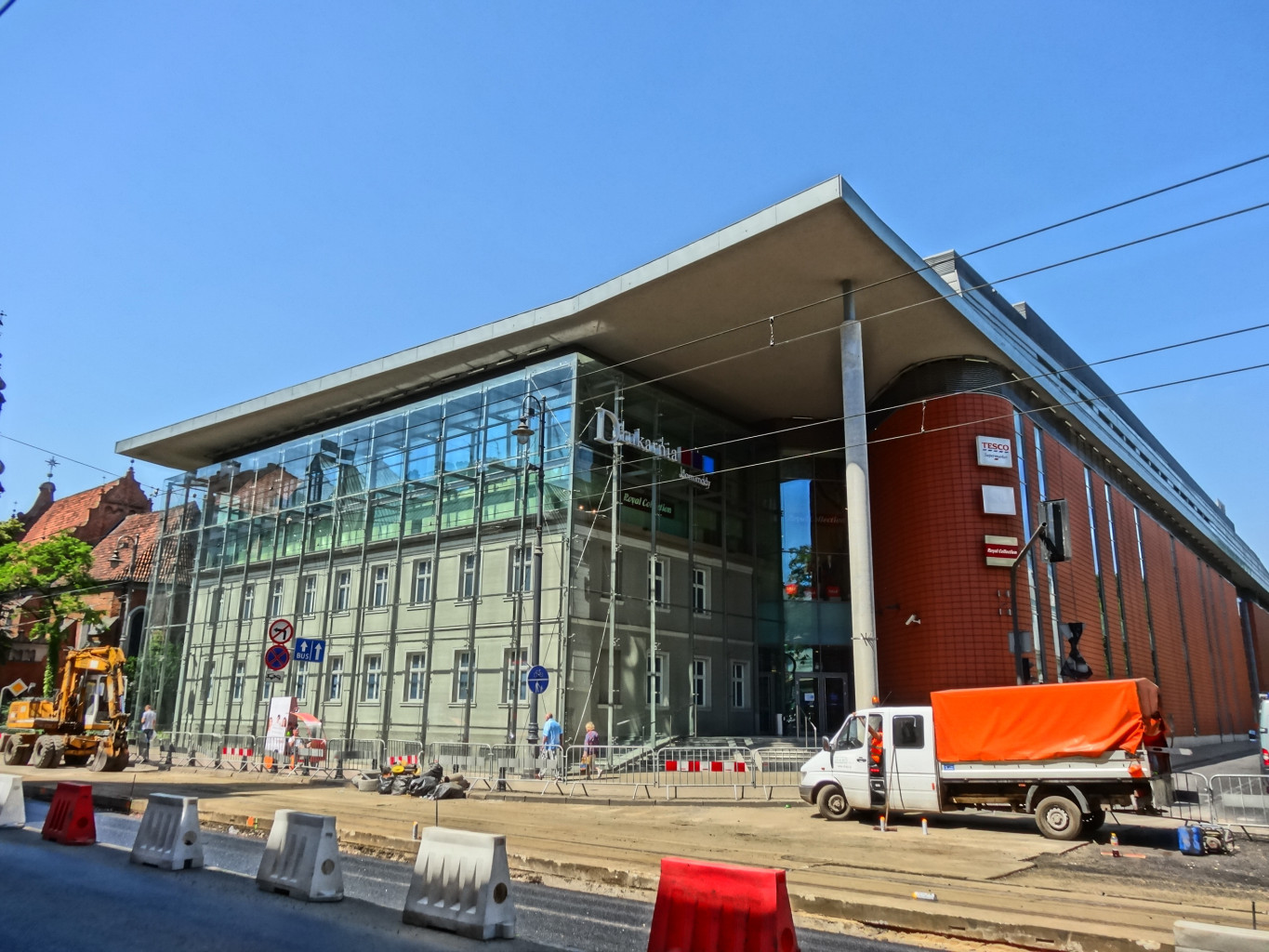
View from Jagiellońska Street

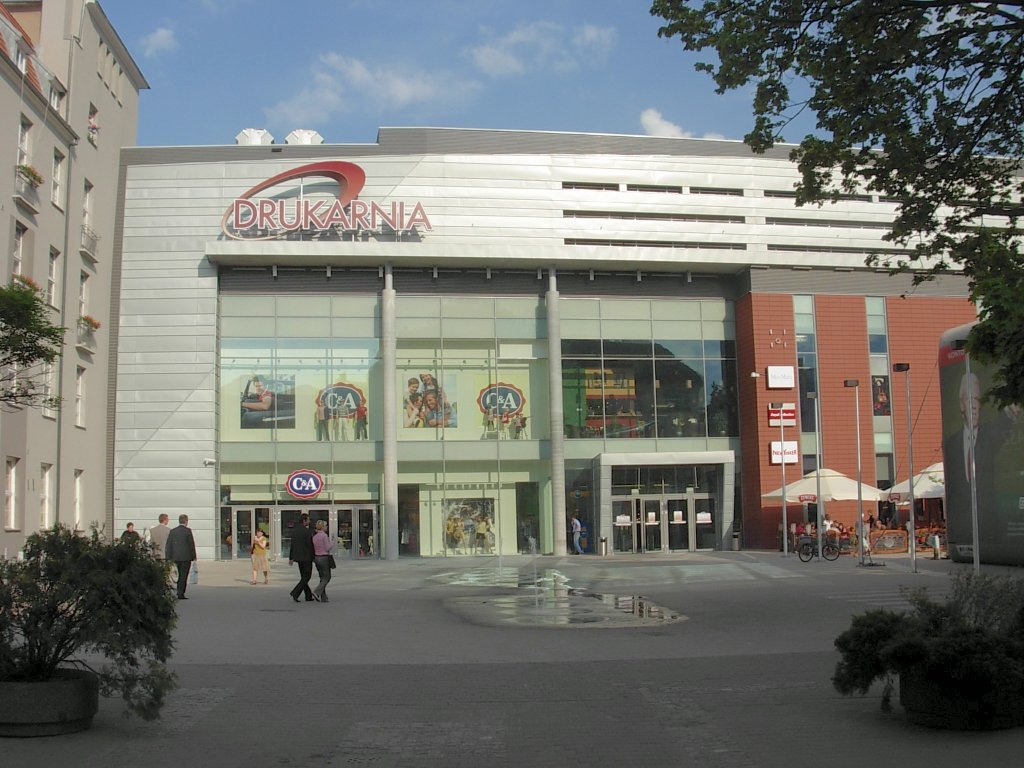
Main entry on Gdańsk Street

=== Tenement at 7 ===
Built in the 1860s

Historicism & Neoclassicism.

At the then Danziger strasse 7 around 1850, the place housed L. Basilius photograph – artist studio. The building has been erected for commercial purposes, especially allowing shopping room on the ground floor. Julius Musolff ran a business from 1872 until World War I. Later on, P. Riemer operated a sports equipment shop.

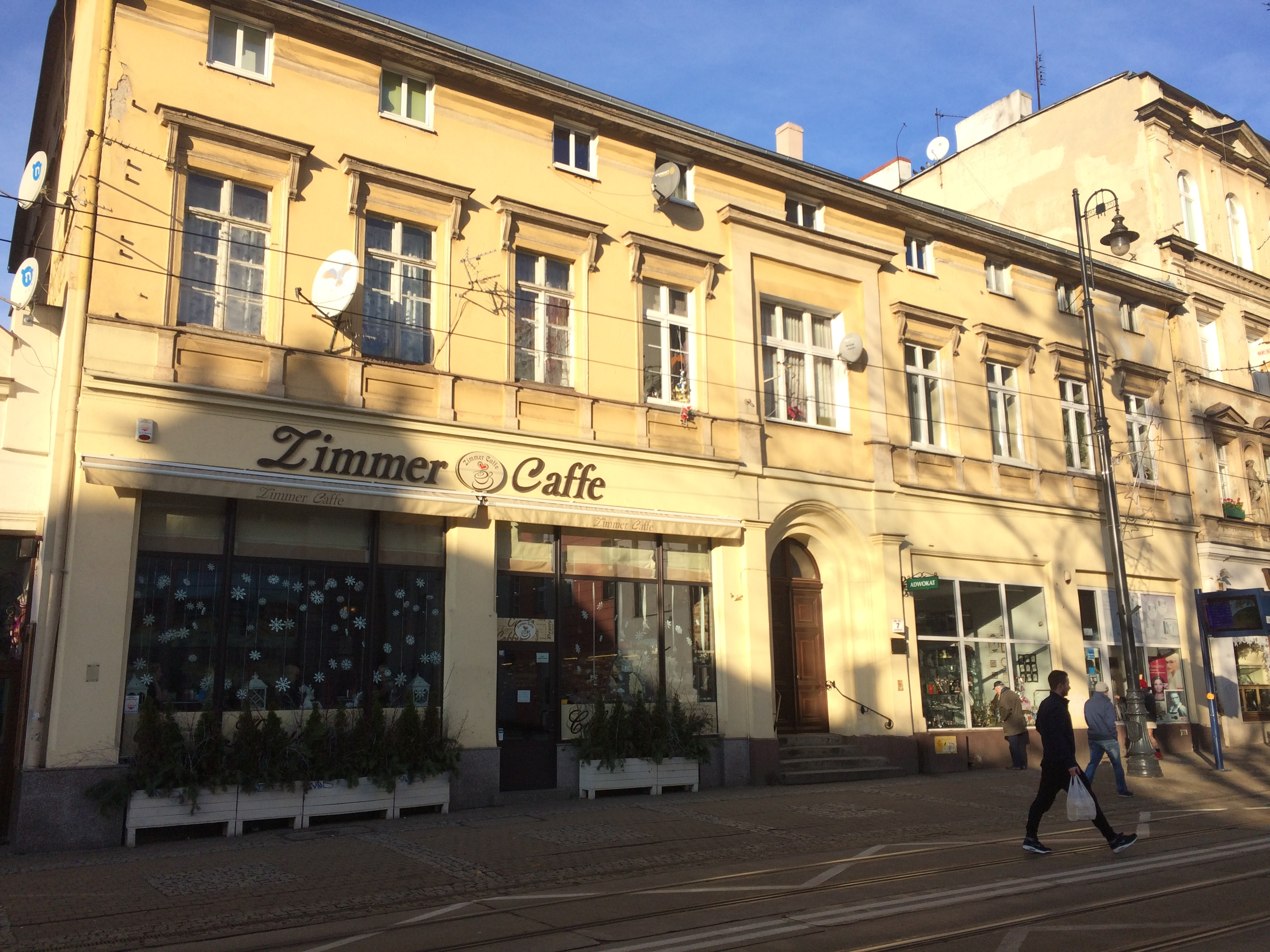
Main facade from Gdańsk Street

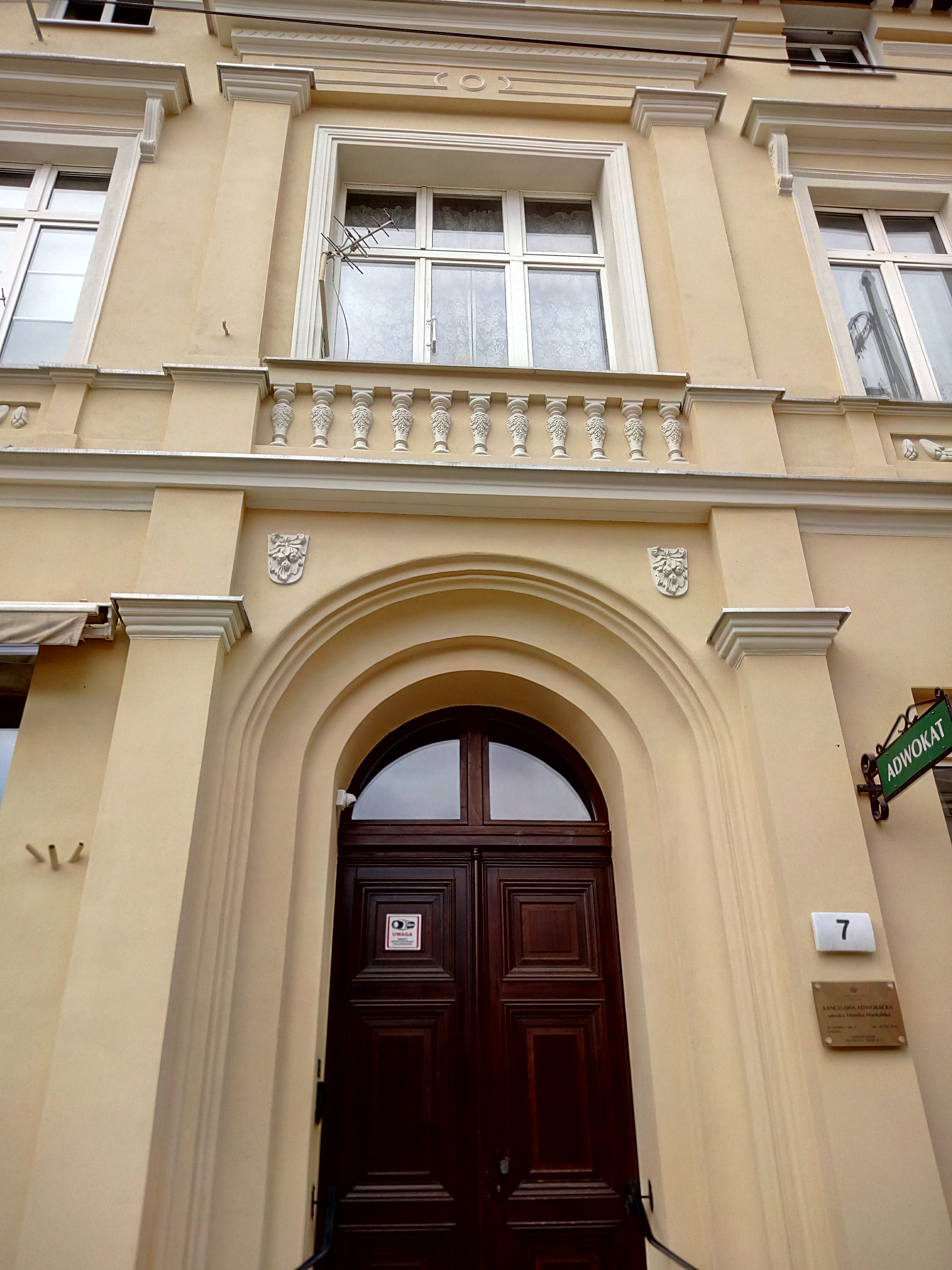
Detail of the gate

=== Franz Kreski Tenement at 9 ===
1875–1900

Eclecticism & Neoclassicism forms.

Franz Kreski was born on 1 October 1844, in Malbork, from a carter father. After a divorce, he moved to Bydgoszcz and married on 29 October 1878, Emma Redmann, from Białe Błota. The couple had five children. In 1868, Franz opened there a store, selling plethora of items, from tobacco and haberdashery to revolvers through porcelain and lamps. At the beginning of the 20th century, his warehouse of home furnishings and kitchen equipment occupied about 2,000 square metres (22,000 sq ft). In February 1919, Franz Kreski handed over the company to his sons Waldemar, Robert and Franz. The family business operated until World War II, but slowly came to an end in January 1945. In 1905, Emil Warmiński opened his medical practice there, one of the first businesses to display a Polish language plaque at the time of Prussian occupation.

The building also housed the photography workshop of Joop Theodor, one of the largest in the city. Theodor also had studios in Gdańsk and Toruń, running his own firm (Theodor Joop & Company). This workshop was later used by the photographer Lorenzo Basilius. From 1909 until the end of the 1930s, "Centrala Optyczna", an optical shop run by Mr Zakaszewski was installed here, together with a fur shop in the 1920s. In 1945, the backyard of the tenement housed "Dekora", an art studio.

The building is adorned with two niched statues on the first level of the facade representing feminine allegories of Trade and Industry.

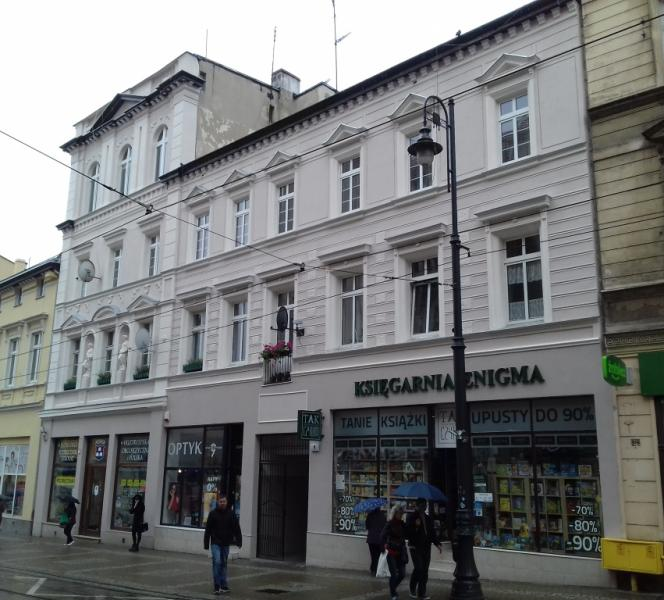
Main Frontage

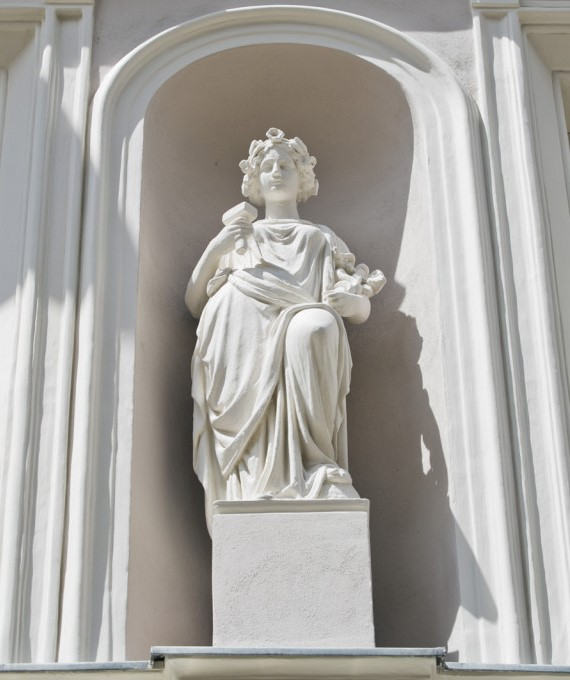
Allegory of Industry, renovated

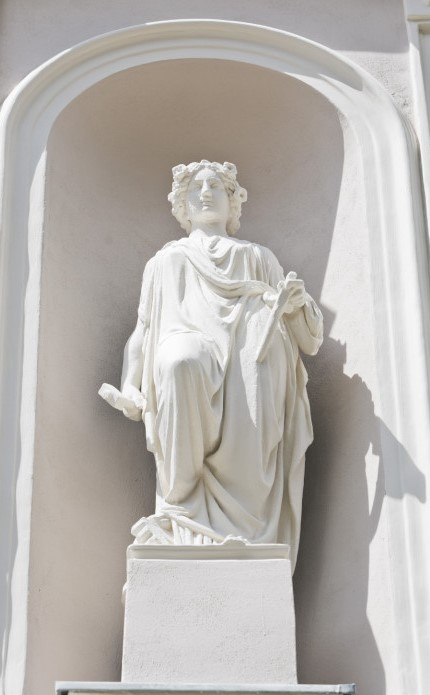
Allegory of Trade, renovated

=== Ernst Mix Tenement, at 10 ===
Built in 1863-1905 and 1913–1914, by Fritz Weidner

Early Modern Architecture.

Originally a soap factory, it has, later on, housed a department store and a movie theatre till 2003.

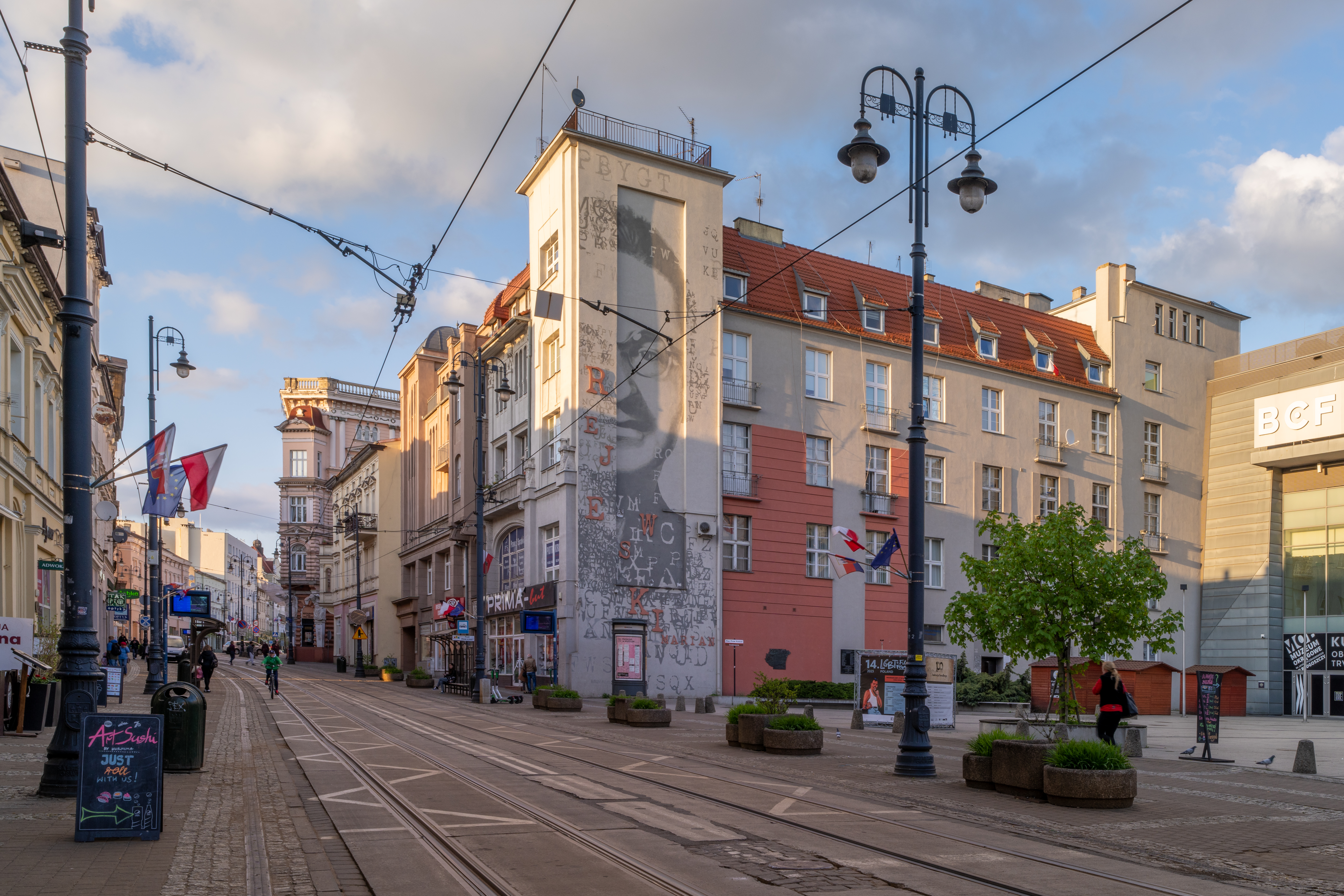
Ernst Mix tenement

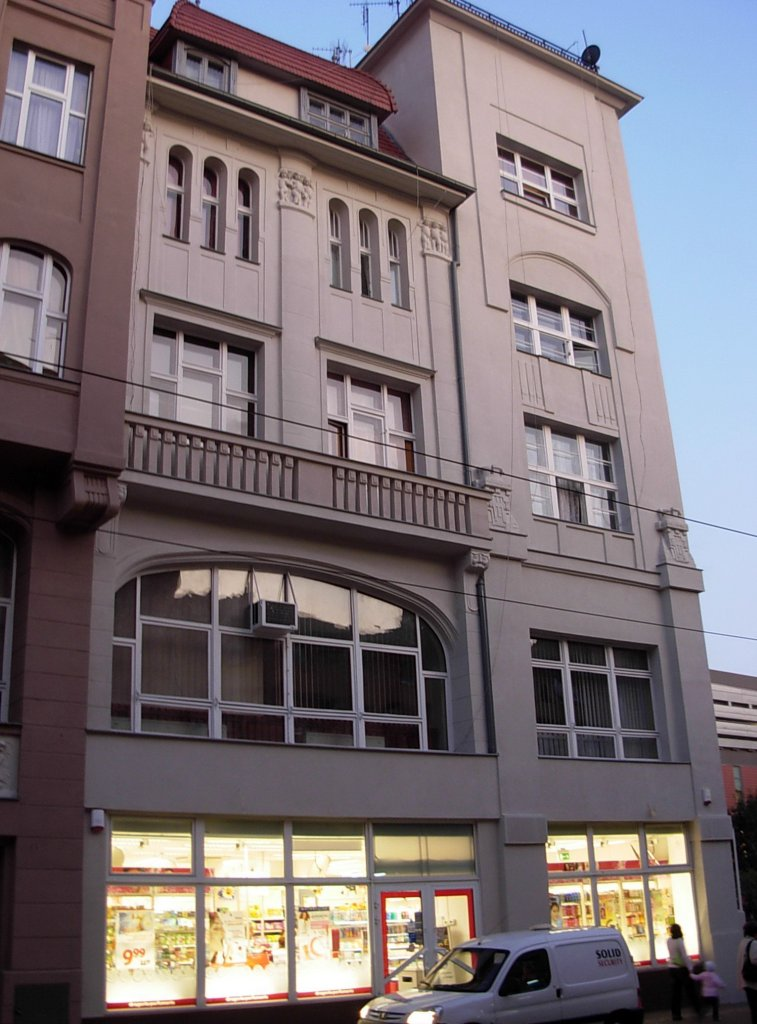
Part of the frontage onto Gdańska Street

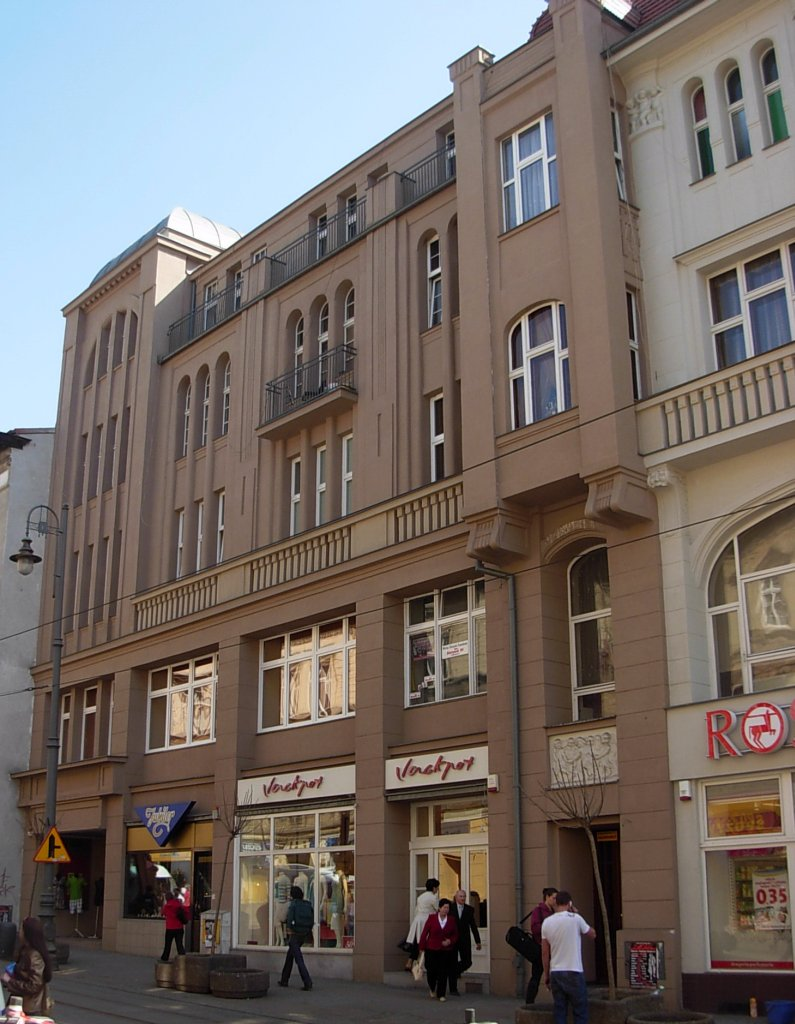
Part of the frontage onto Gdańska Street

=== Tenement at 11 ===
1875–1900

Built by Józef Święcicki, Eclecticism & Neoclassicism.

In 1887 the landlord, merchant Carl Walle had the house extended with a residential wing designed by architect Joseph Święcicki.

Frontage style is a continuity of an adjacent building (Nr.9), with adorned panels, friezes of angels and meander motifs.

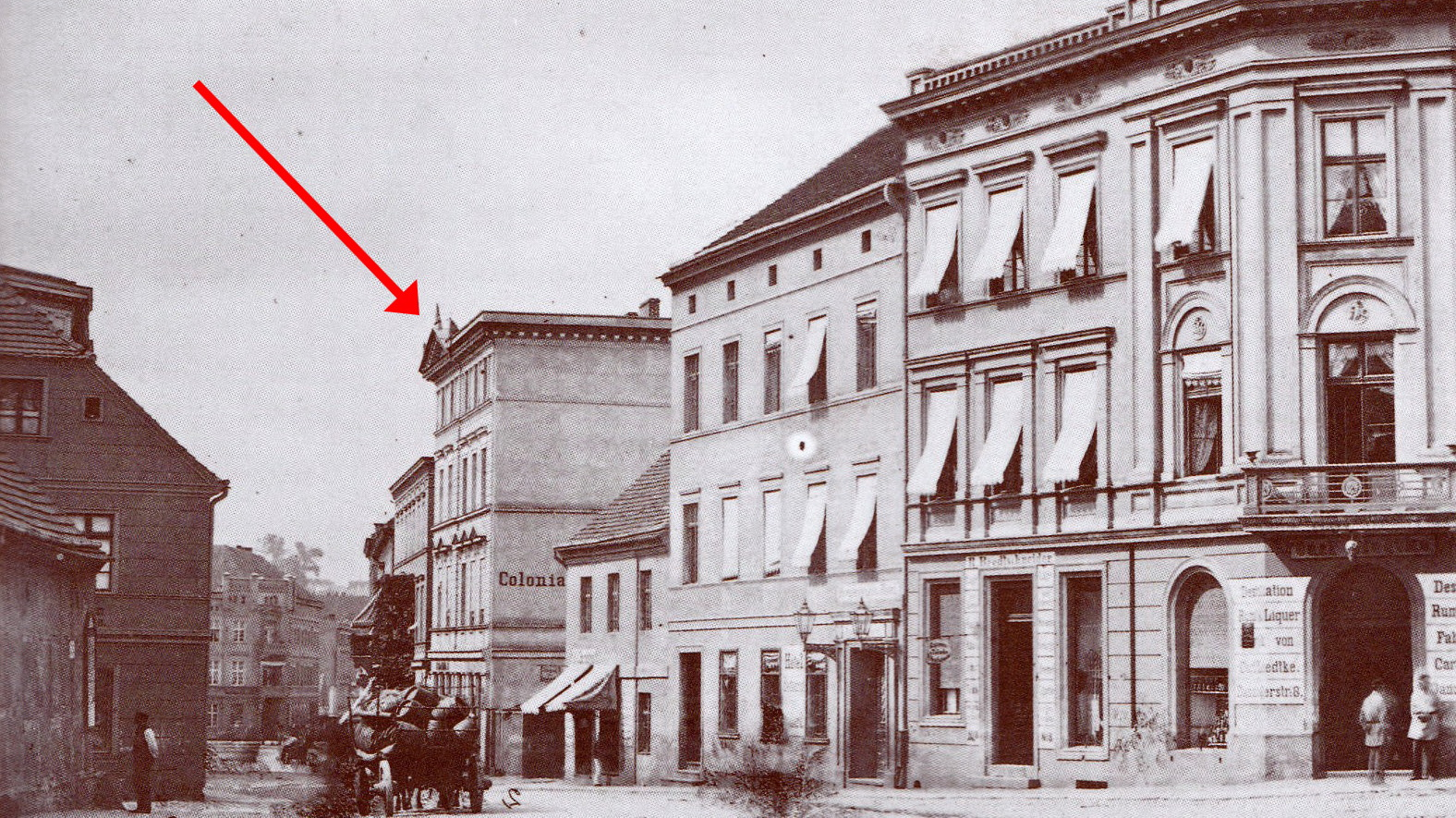
View of Nr.11 frontage ca 1878

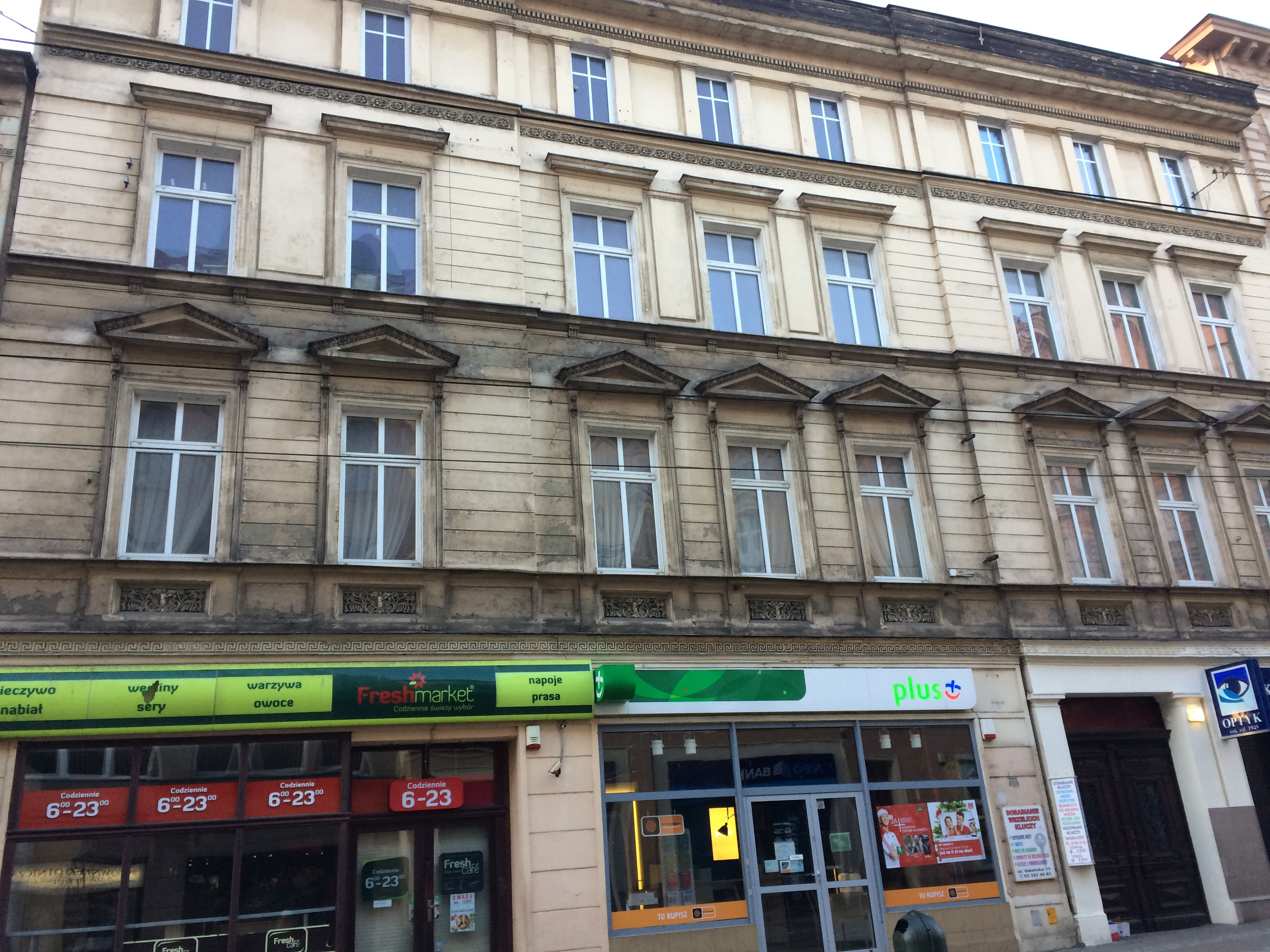
Main facade

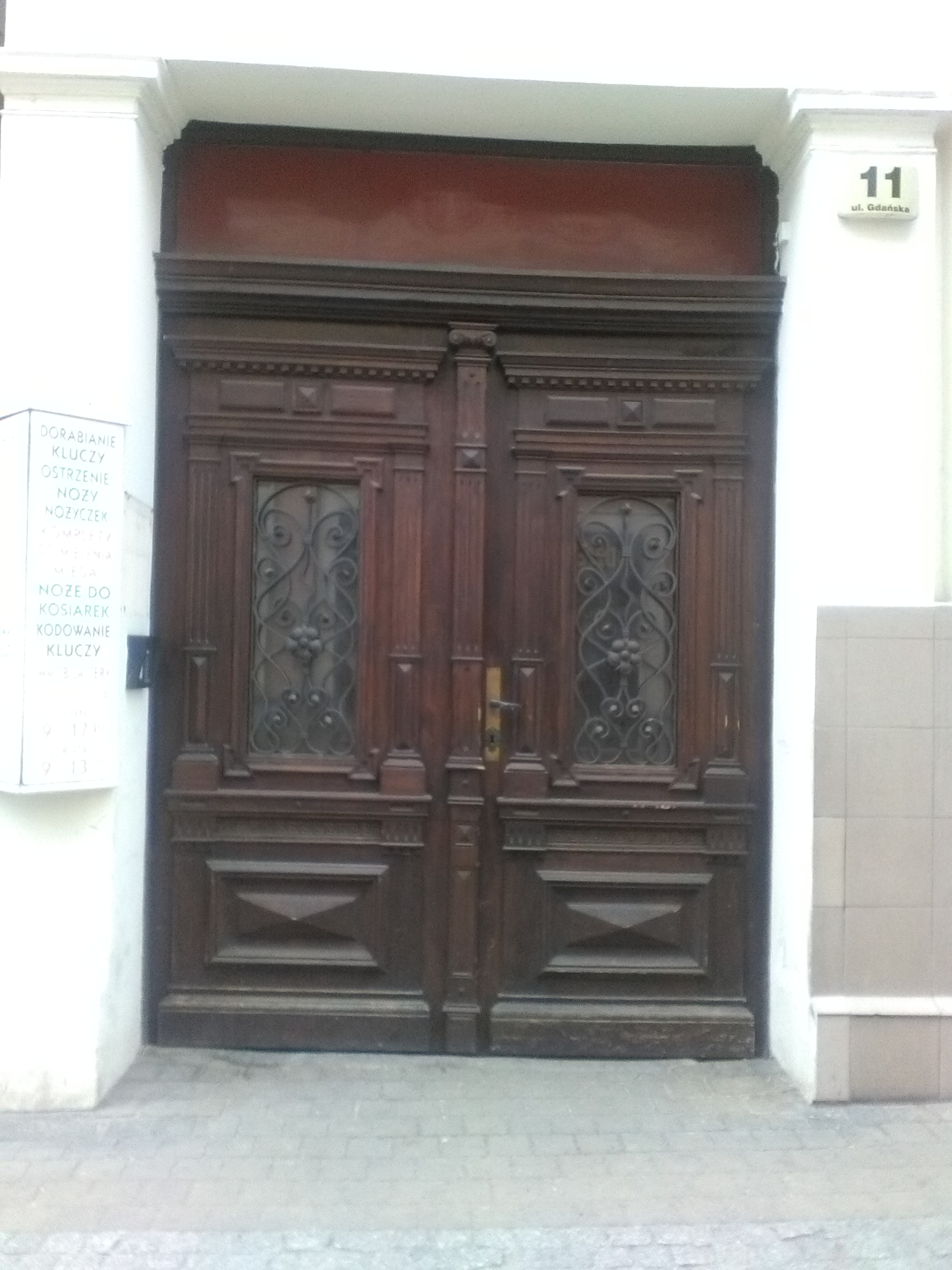
Main door

=== Tenement at 12 ===
ca 1860

Historicism

The tenement is on the corner with Parkowa street. The facade still has many preserved and diverse architectural details, such as an adorned bay window on the corner of the building, window pediments on the second floor and fake-column decoration on each side of first floor windows.

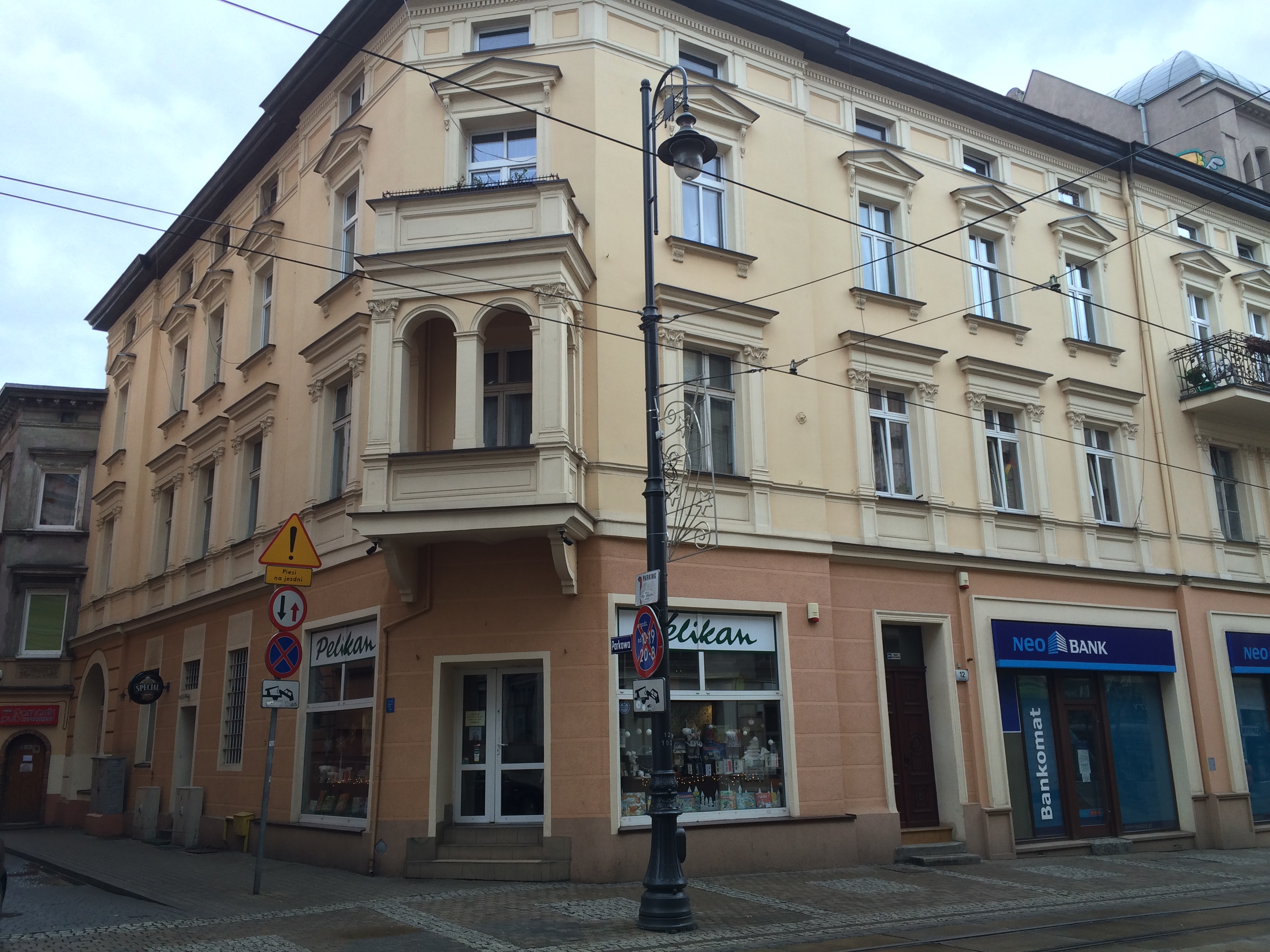
View on both facades

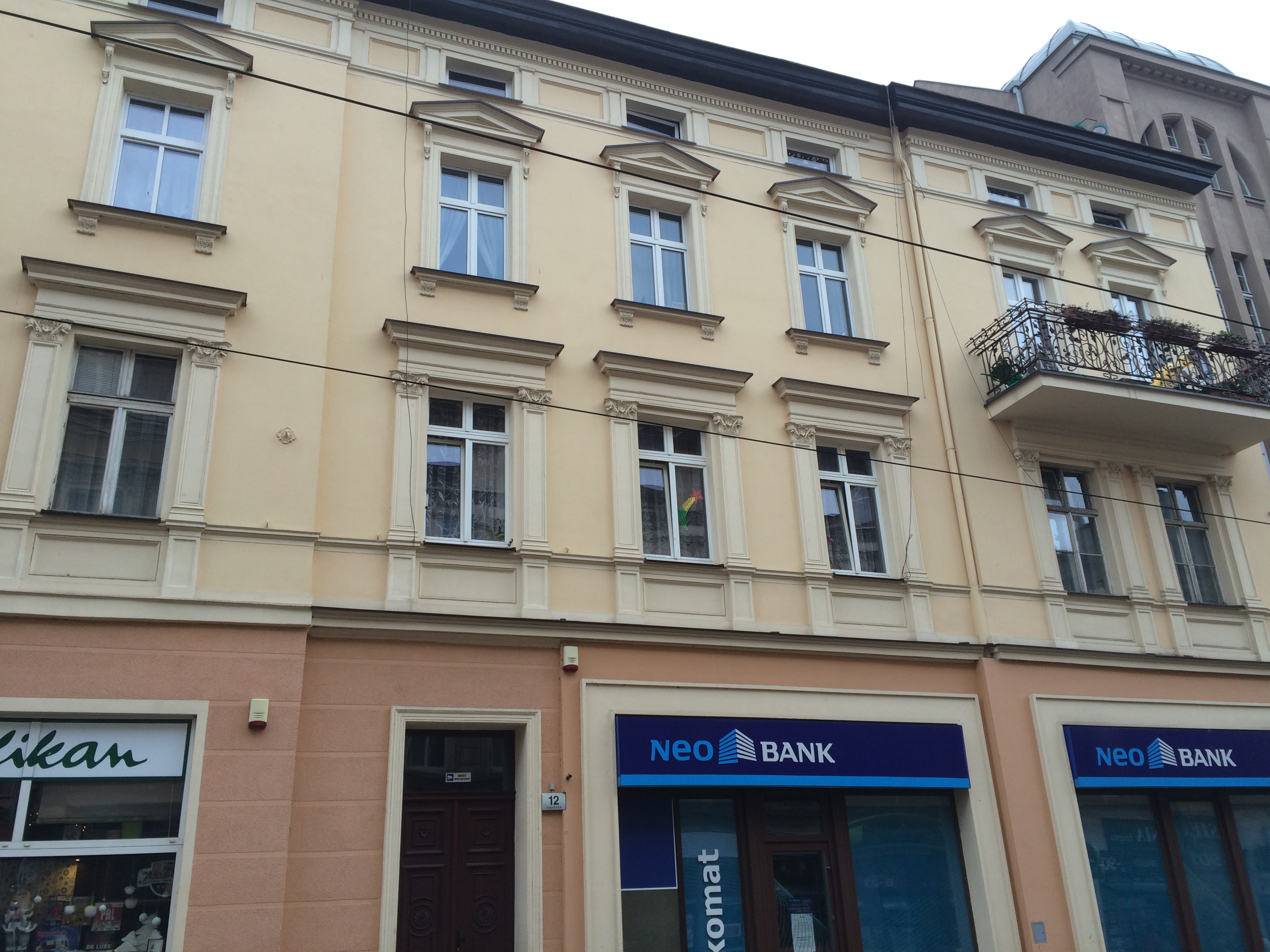
Gdańska street facade

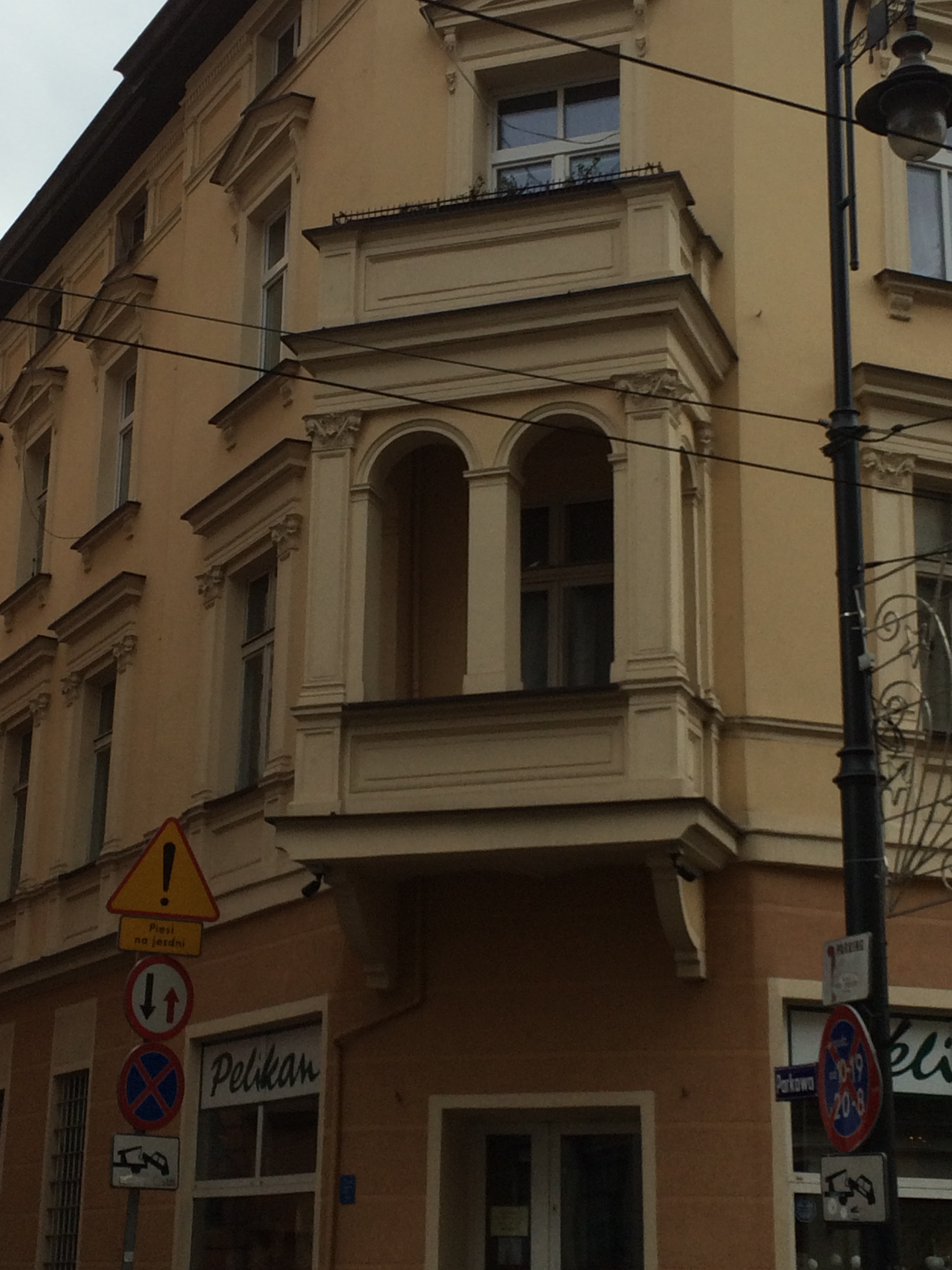
Detail of the bay window

=== Tenement at 13 ===
ca. 1875–1900.

Neoclassicism.

This plot near the intersection with Dworcowa Street belonged to the family Pawlikowski, who were hoteliers in Bromberg in the second half of the 19th century. In 1882, Pawlikowski built an eclectic arrangement of building frontages, with reference to neoclassicism.

One can notice the decoratively designed gate, the pediments above middle windows, the balcony with its adorned balustrade. The façade is crowned by a frieze with a rich decoration.

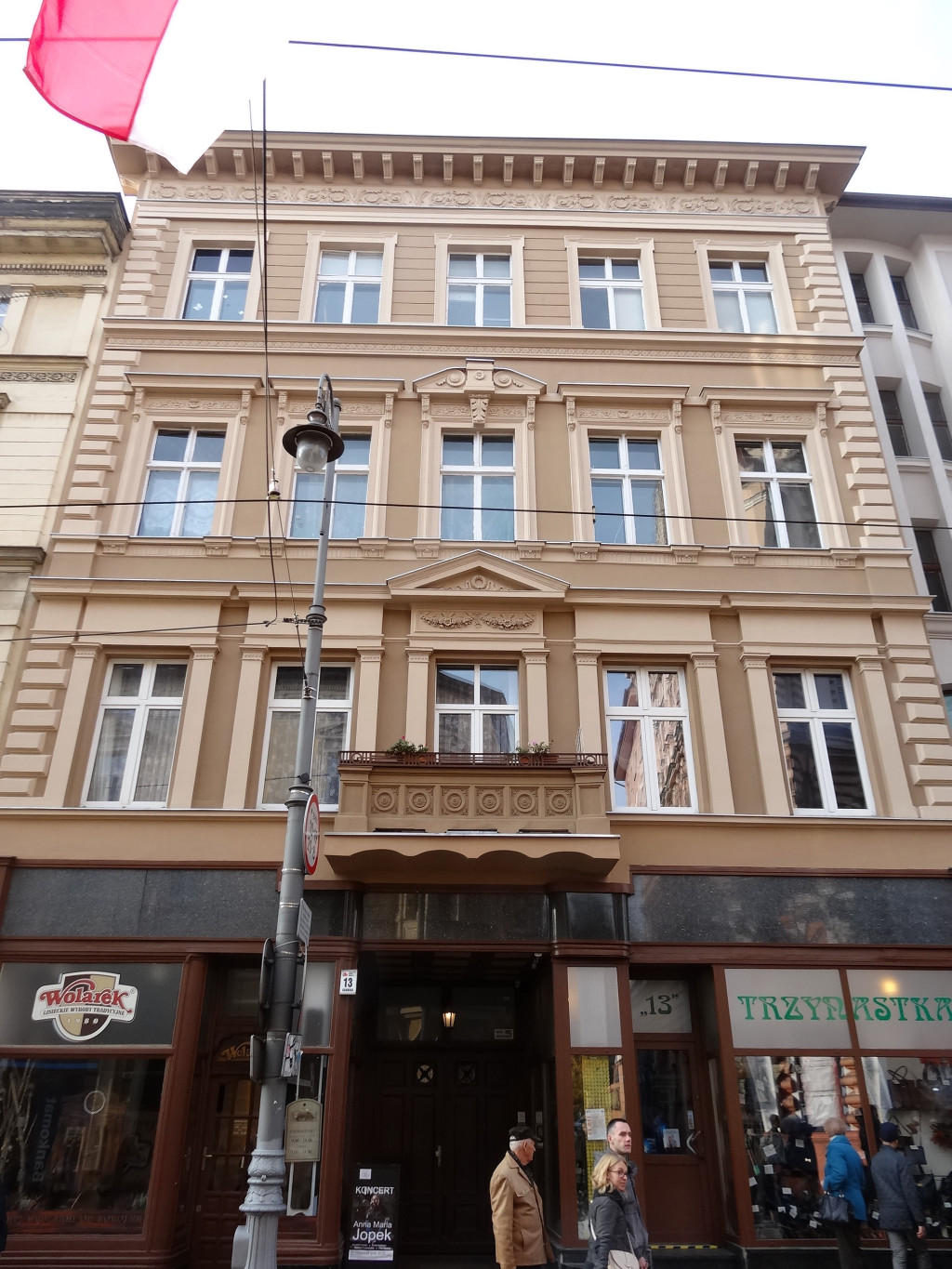
Main facade

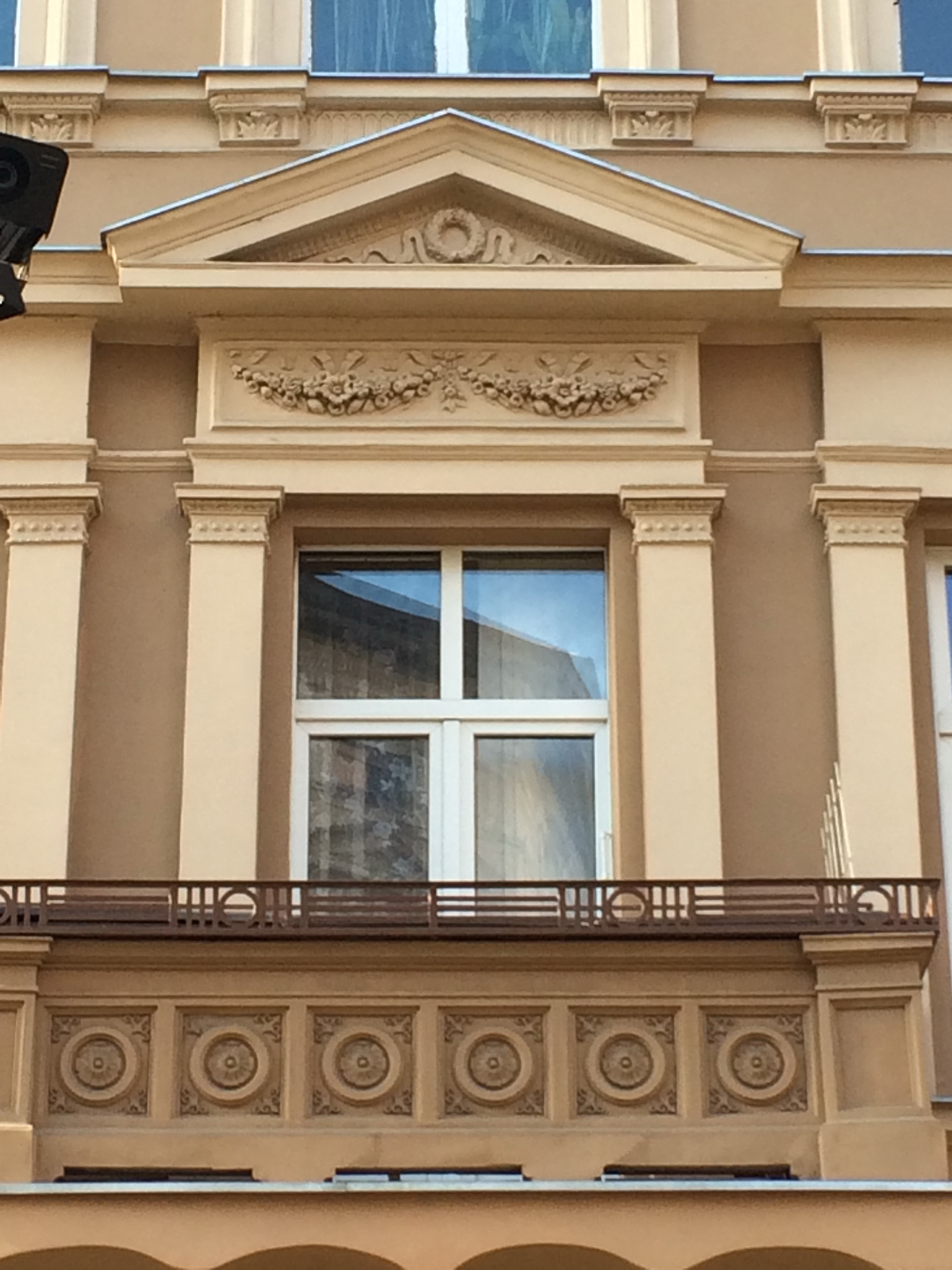
Detail of balcony

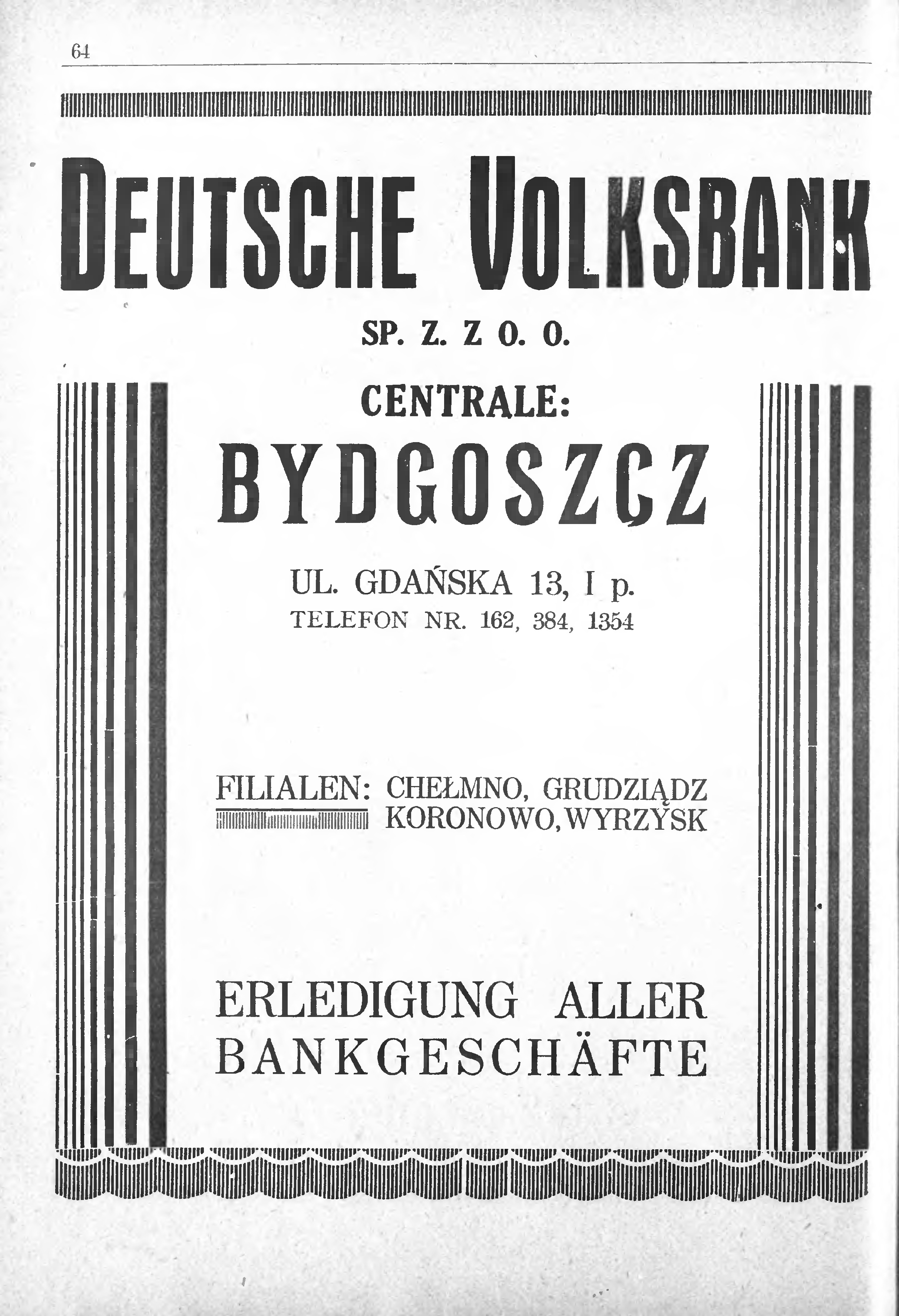
Advertising for a bank in 1928

=== Hotel Pod Orłem, at 14 ===
Registered on Kuyavian-Pomeranian Voivodeship heritage list: Nr.601295-reg.90/A, 15 December 1974.

Built in 1893–1896 by Józef Święcicki, rebuilt in 1926, 1939, 1987.

Eclectism & Neo-Baroque.

The oldest hotel in Bydgoszcz, still in business. It is now a 4-star rated facility.

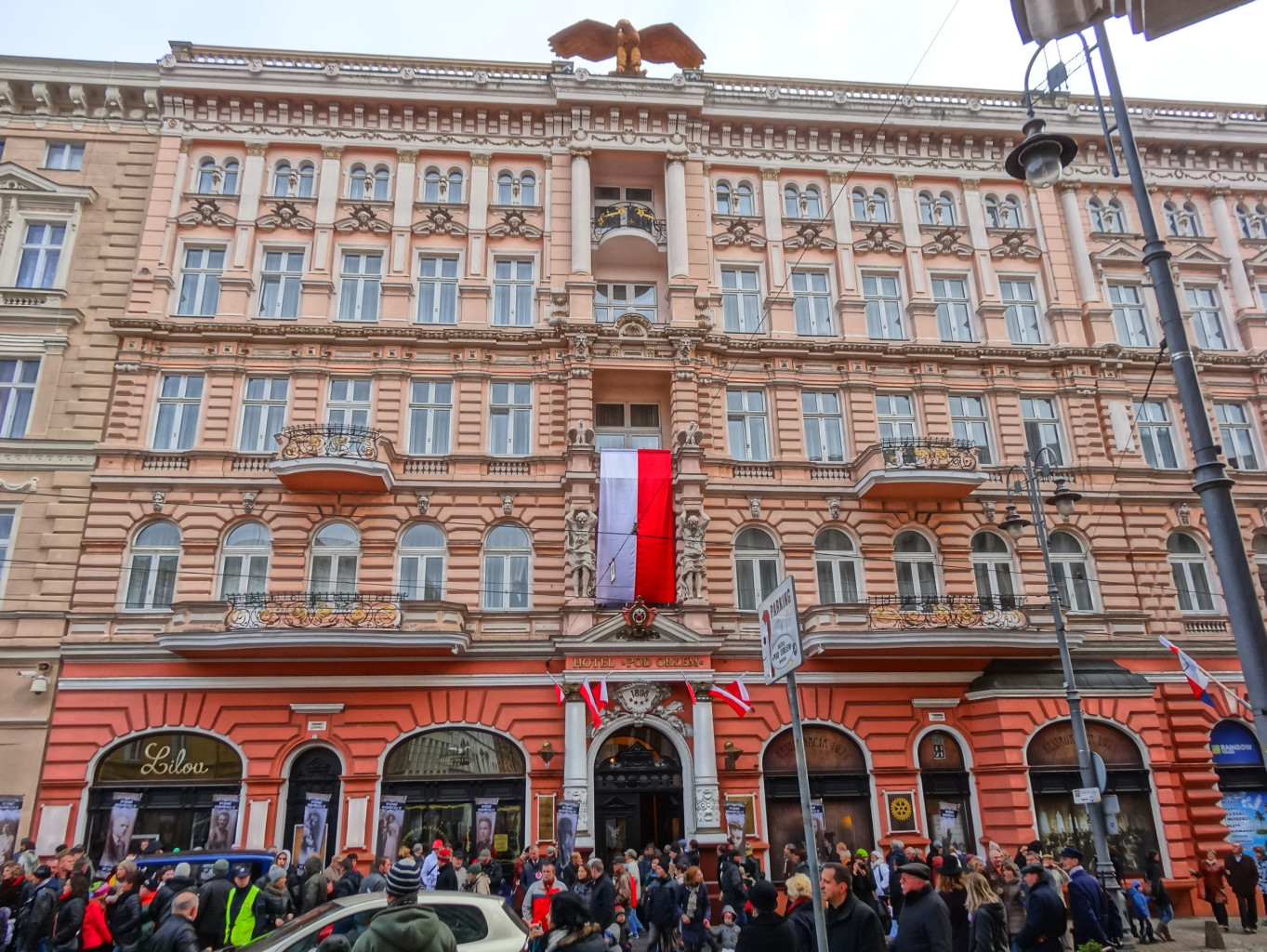
Hotel Pod Orłem facade onto Gdańska Street

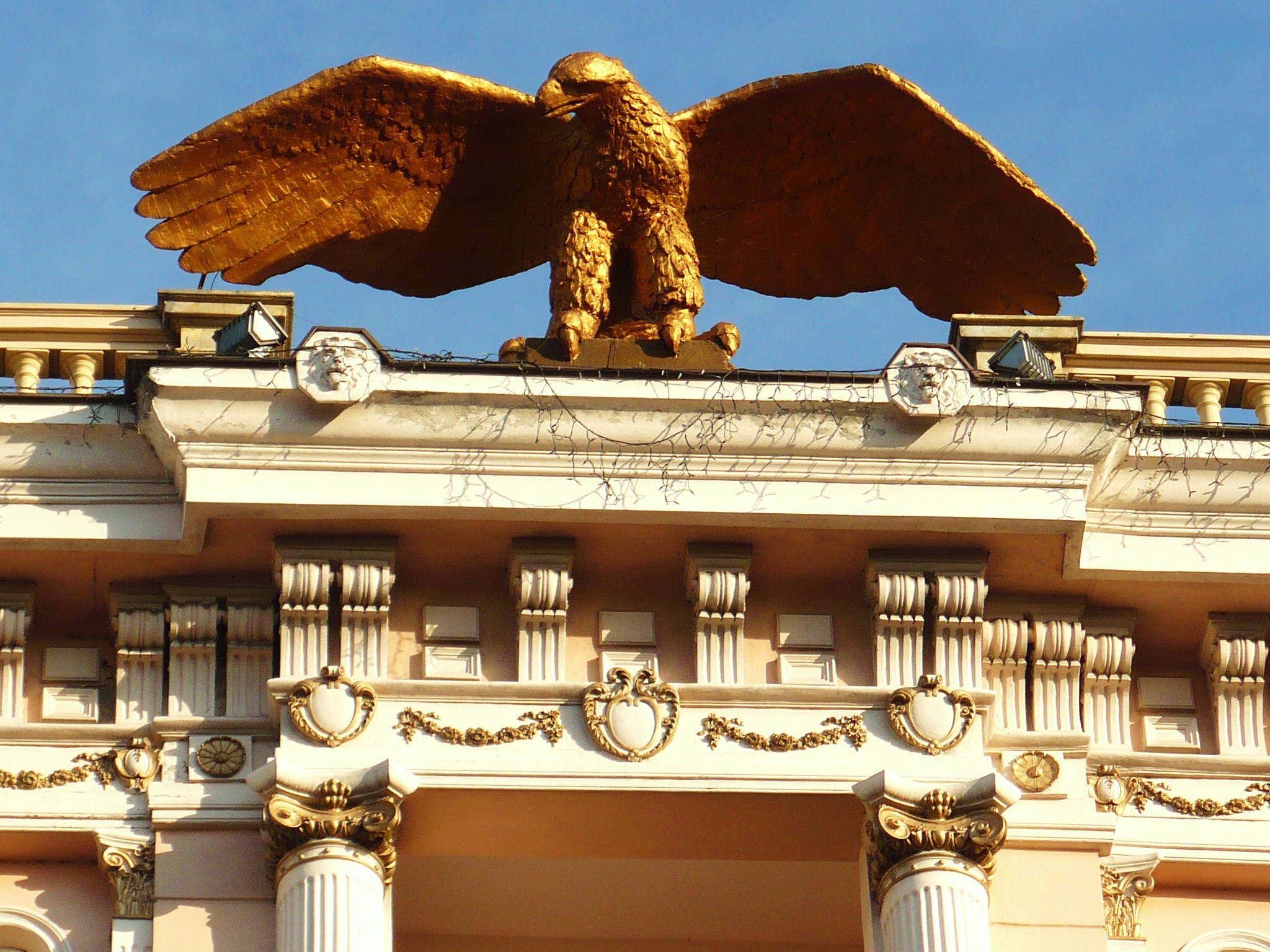
The eagle, emblem of the hotel set at the top of the frontage

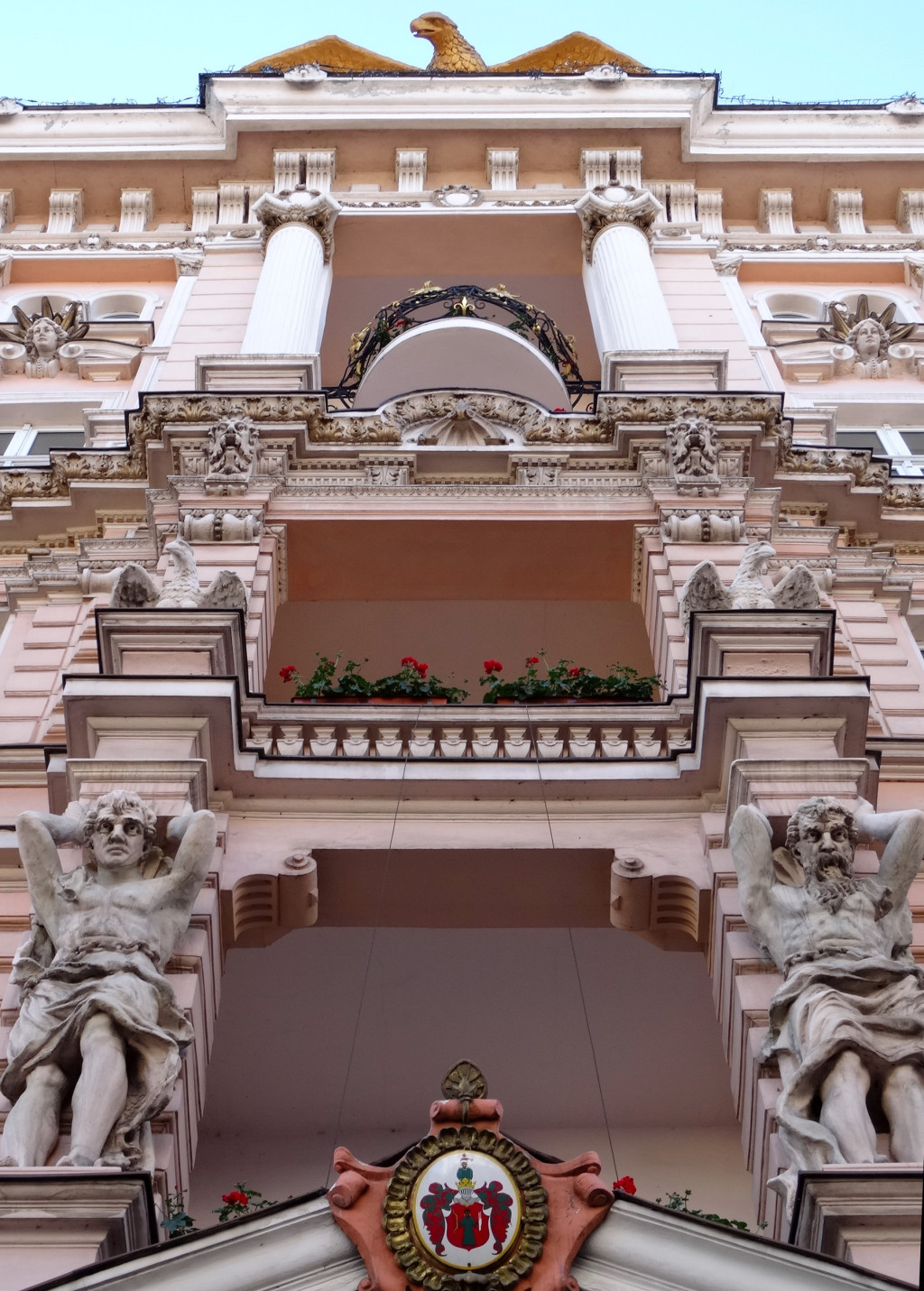
Detail of the facade, with atlantes
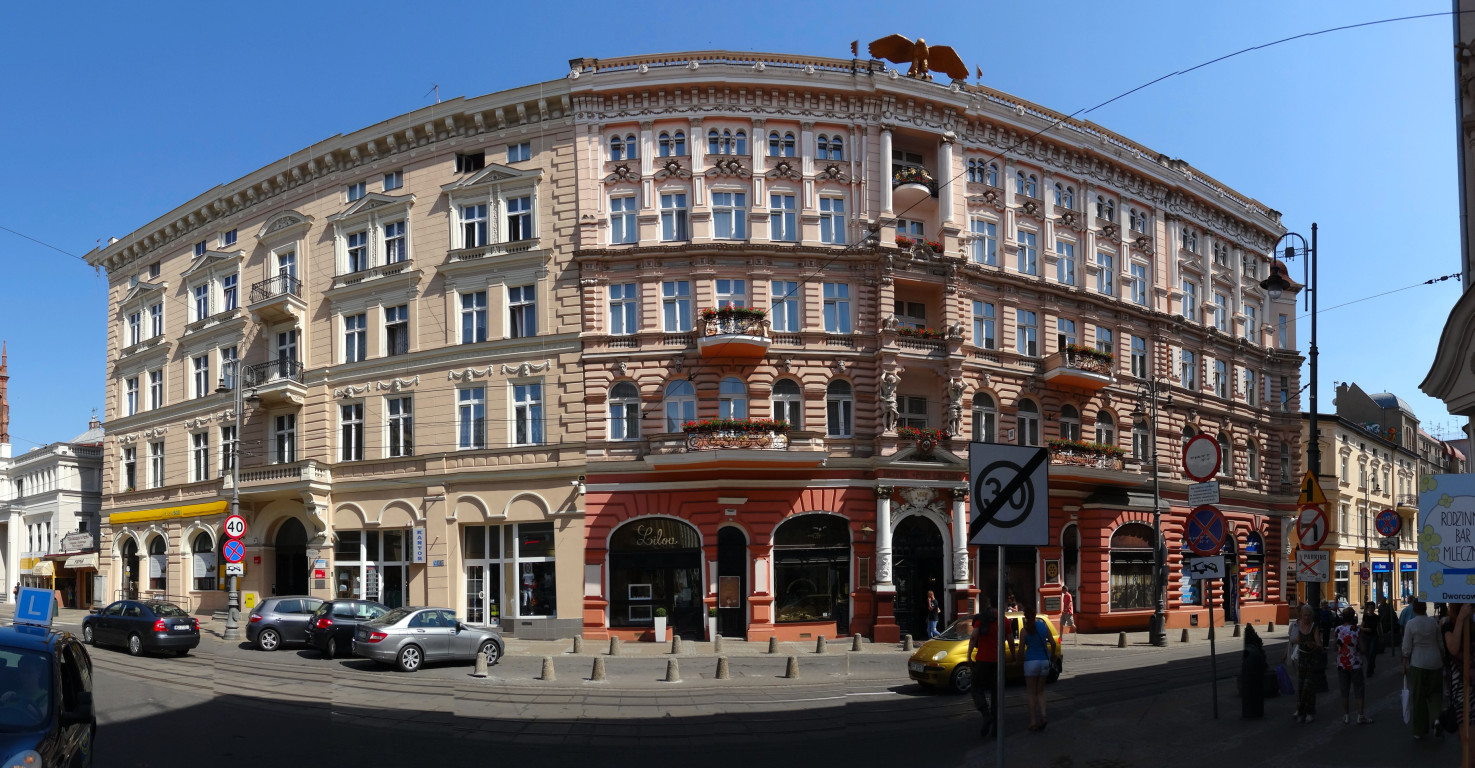
Emil Bernhardt tenement (left), Hotel "Pod Orlem" (right)

=== Department Store "Jedynak", at 15 ===
Registered on Kuyavian-Pomeranian Voivodeship heritage list: Nt.601296-reg.87/A, 10 December 1971.

Built in 1910–1911 by Otto Walter

Modern Architecture.

One of the first Department Store built in Bydgoszcz, it pioneered the use of reinforced concrete in a modern design.

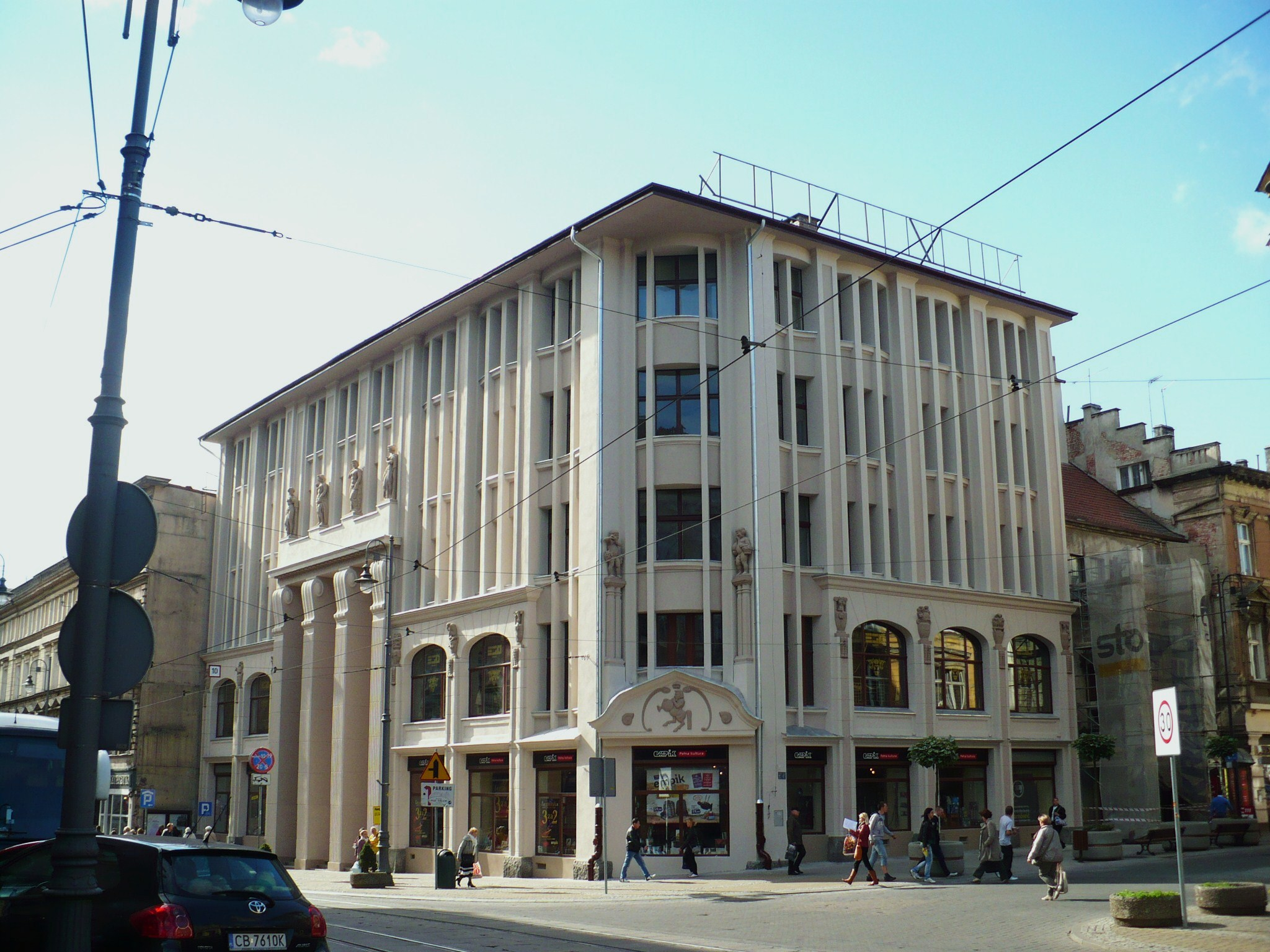
Department Store "Jedynak"

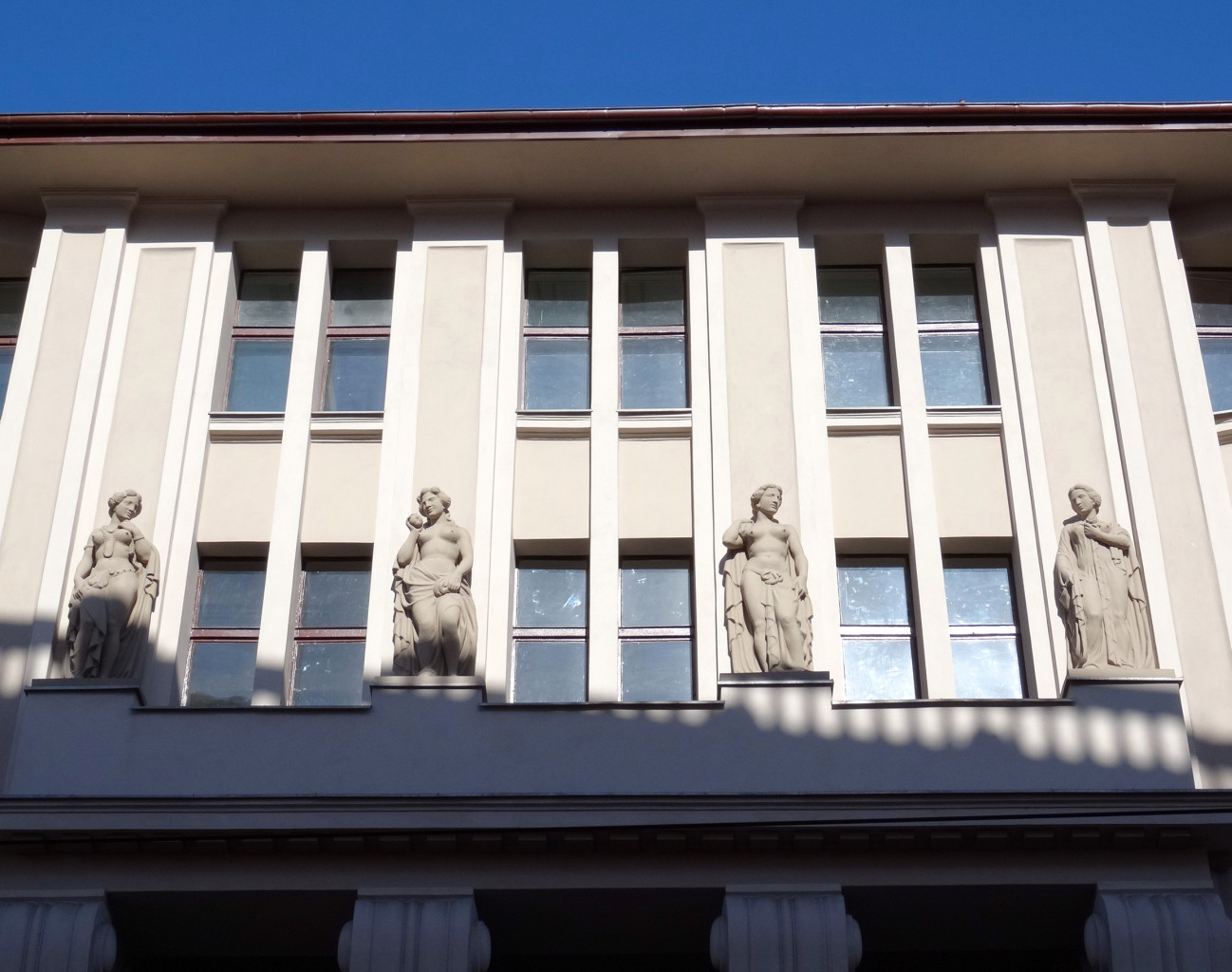
Allegories on the facade

=== Emil Bernhardt tenement, at 16 ===
Registered on Kuyavian-Pomeranian Voivodeship heritage list: Nr.735497-reg.A/1558, 30 April 2010.

Built in 1882–1884 by Carl Stampehl

Eclecticism.

Emil Bernhardt was the founder of adjacent Hotel Pod Orłem at 14.

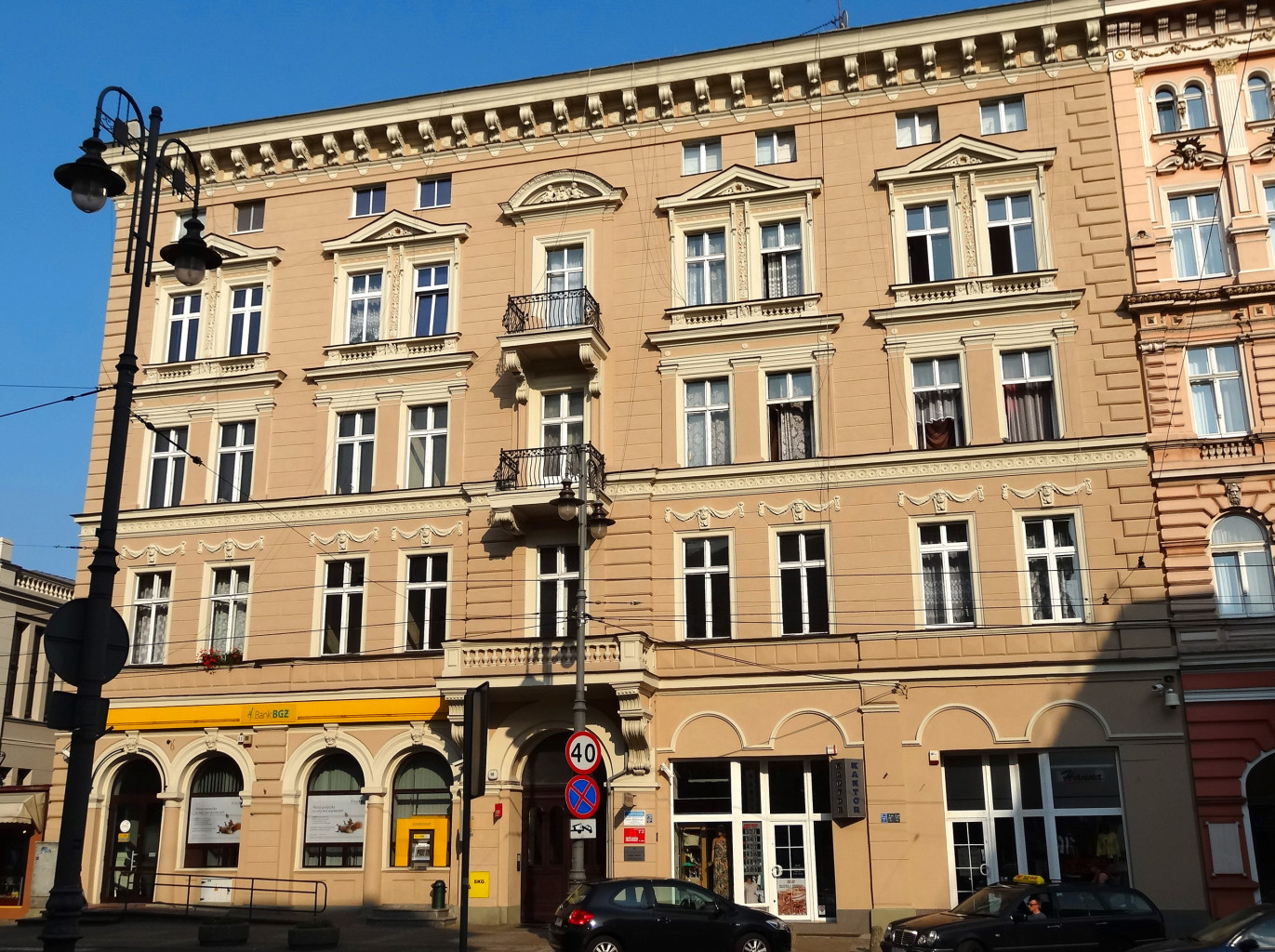
Main frontage

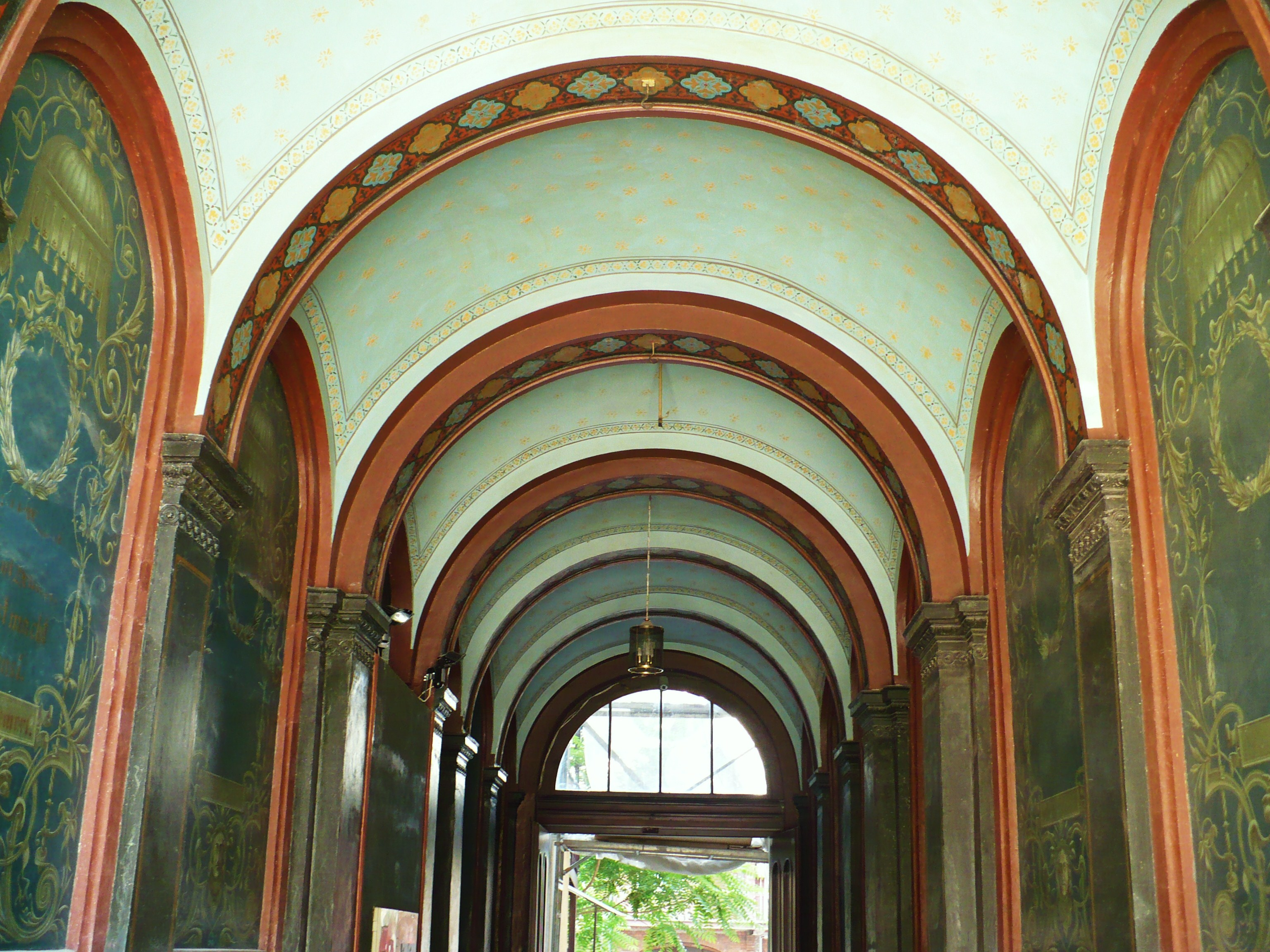
Detail of hallway polychrome.

=== Alexander Timm House at 17, corner with Pomorska Street ===
Built in 1852 by B. Brinkmann, and 1910 by O.F.W. Muller

Eclecticism & Neoclassicism.

At the time of its erection, it was the largest habitation house in Bydgoszcz.

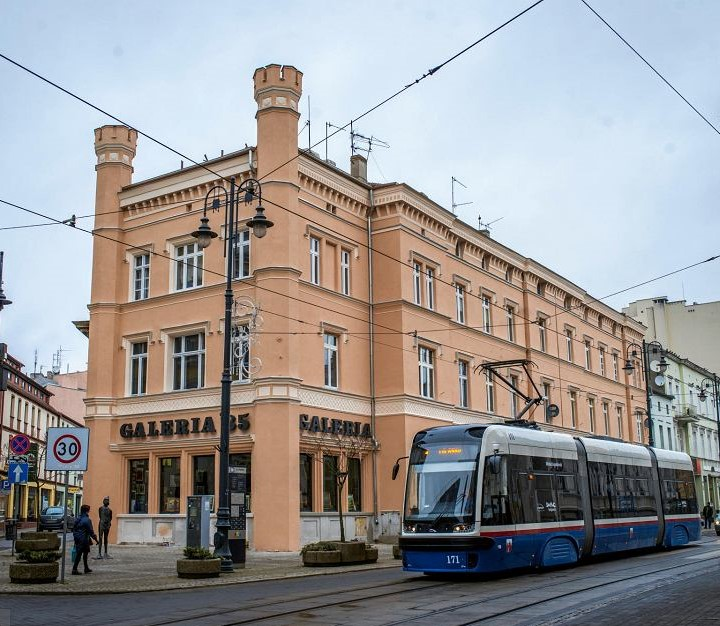
Facade onto Gdańska Street

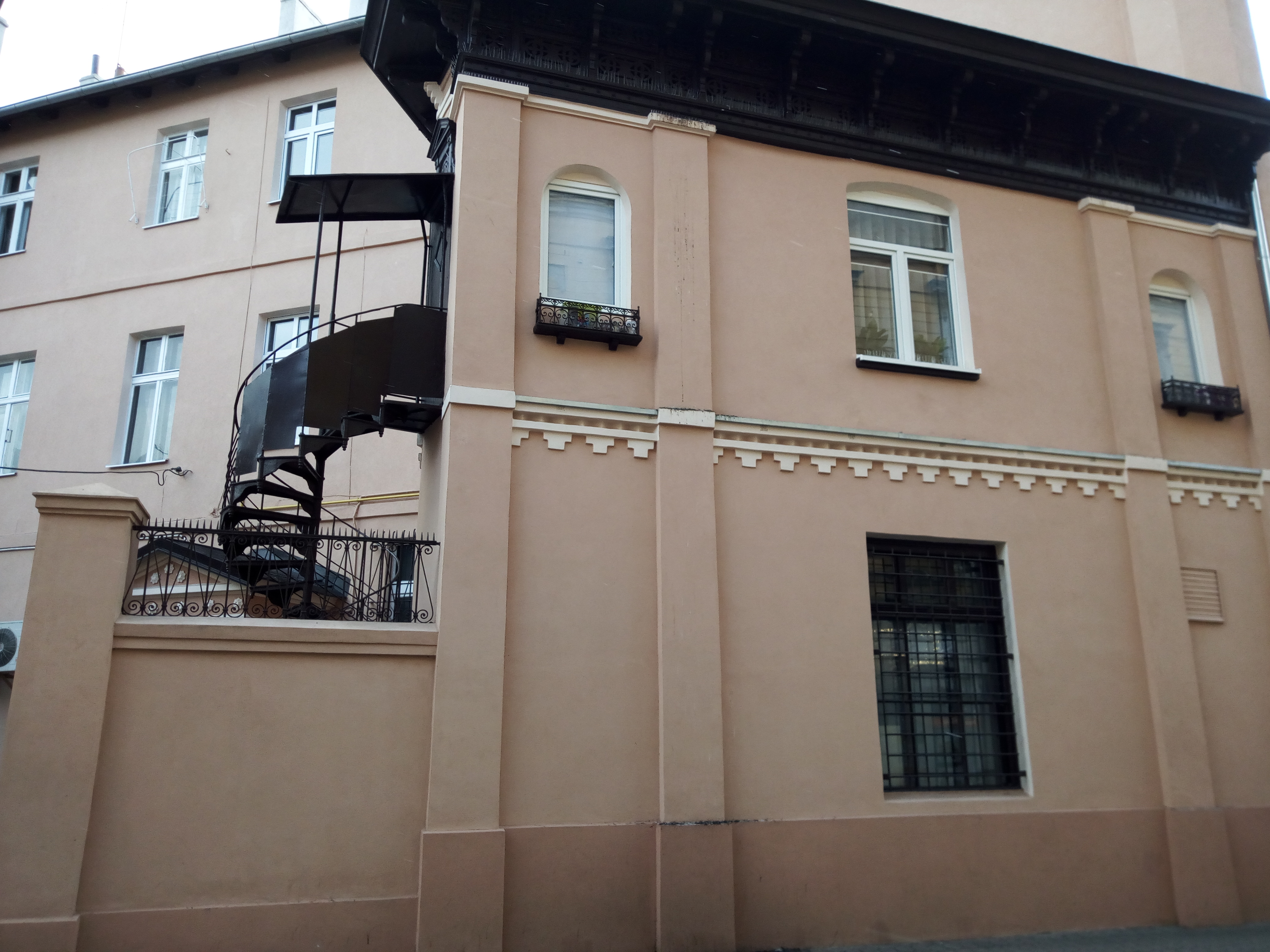
Detail of architectural motifs

=== The Pomeranian Arts House, at 20 ===
Registered on Kuyavian-Pomeranian Voivodeship heritage list, Nr.601297-Reg.A/1116, 18 November 1993.

Built in 1886–1887, by Gustaw Reichert, and renovated in 1908 and 1965

German Historism

The building housed successively German cultural associations (1887–1939), Polish unions, Bydgoszcz Opera Music Theatre (1945–2006), the National School of Fine Arts (till 1982). Since 2006, it is owned by the Bydgoszcz Music Academy "Feliks Nowowiejski".

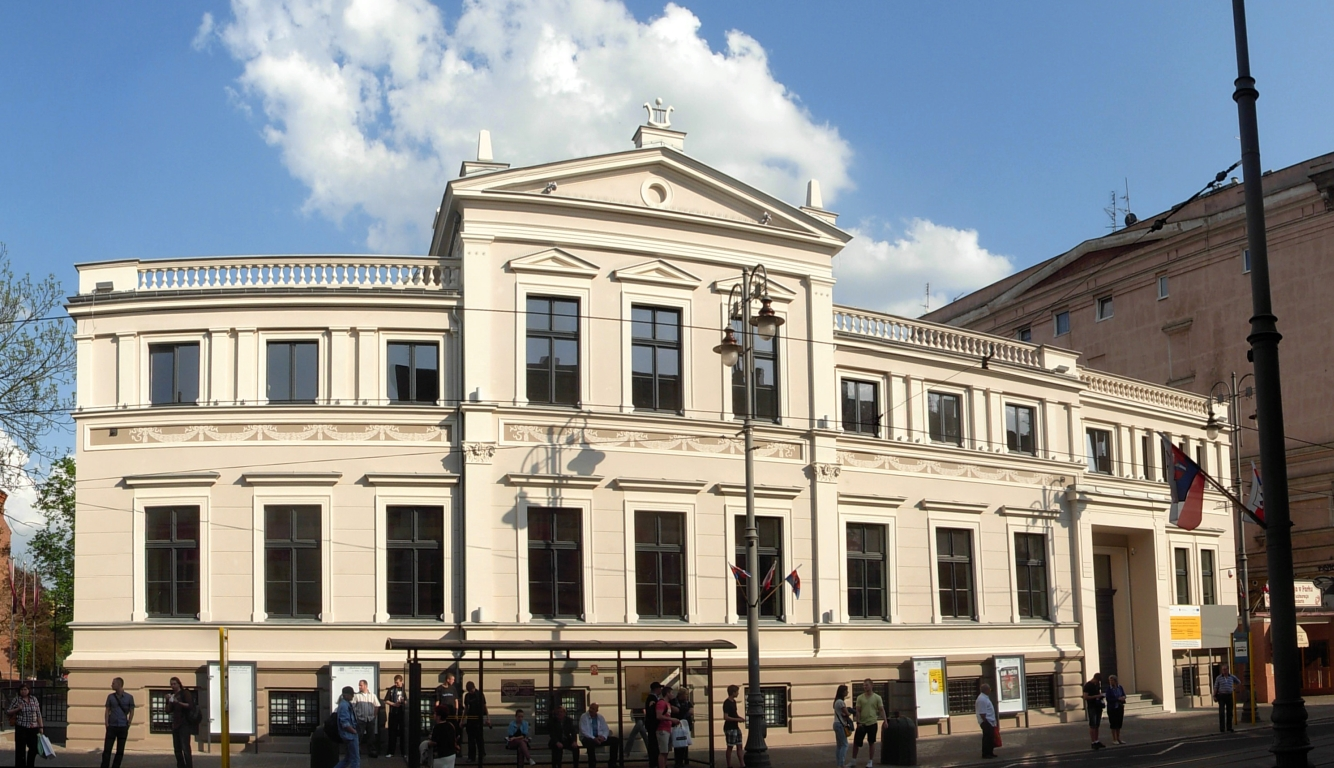
Facade on Gdańska Street

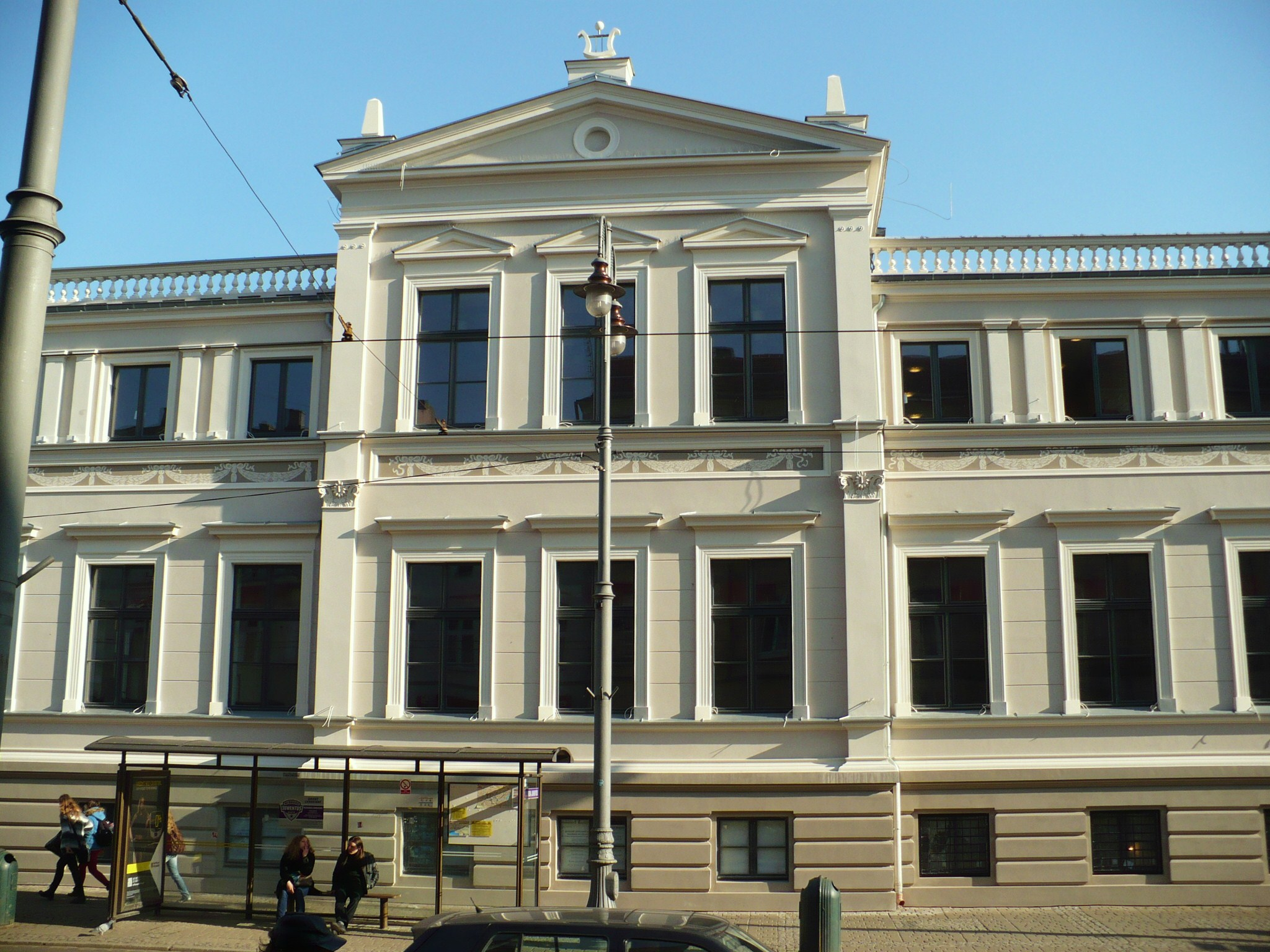
Main avant-corps

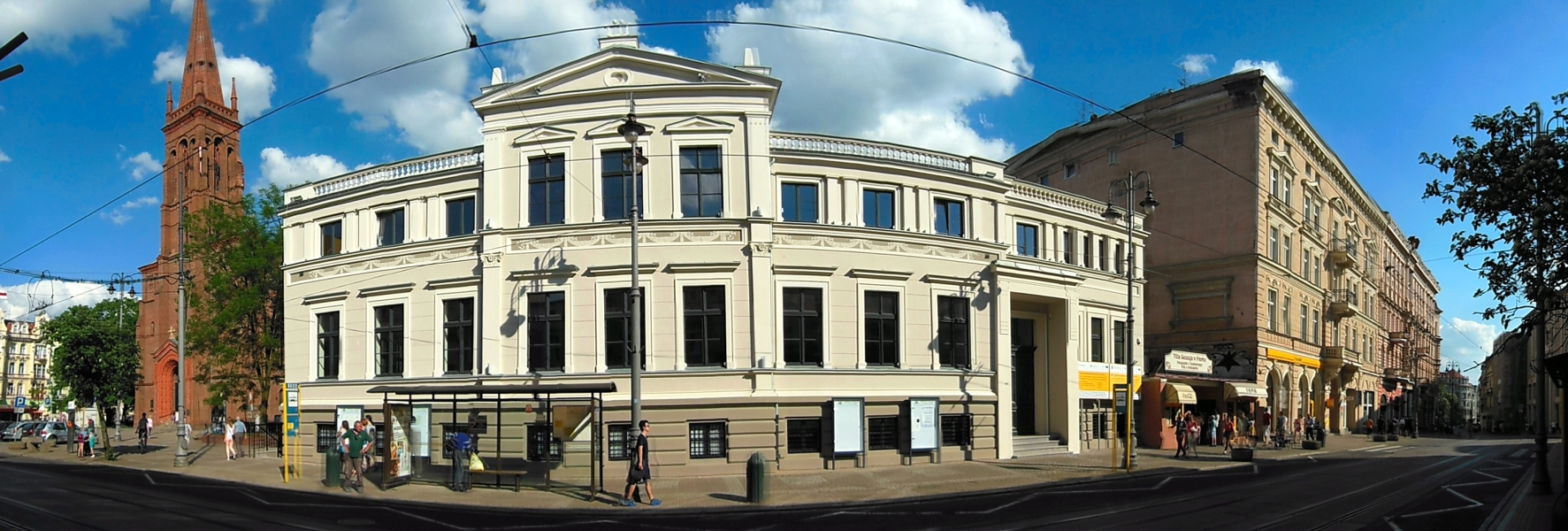
Panorama. Pomeranian Arts House (center), Emil Bernhardt tenement (right)

=== St Peter's and St Paul's Church, Freedom Square ===
Registered on Kuyavian-Pomeranian Voivodeship heritage list: Nr.601297-Reg.A/1116, 18 November 1993.

Built in 1872–1878 by Friedrich Adler

Eclecticism, Neo-Gothic & Neo-Romanesque.

It was a Protestant church until 1945.

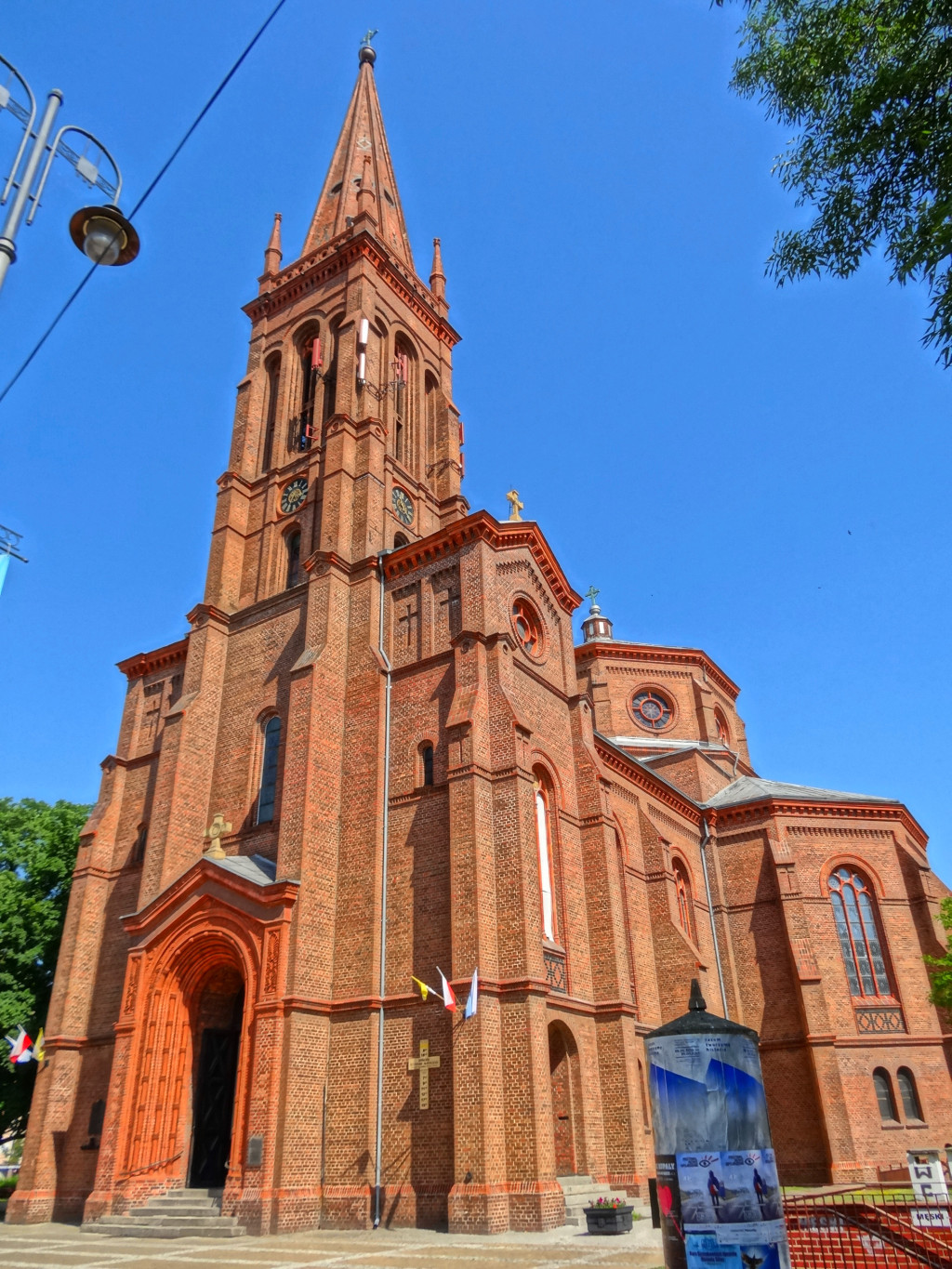
Main frontage

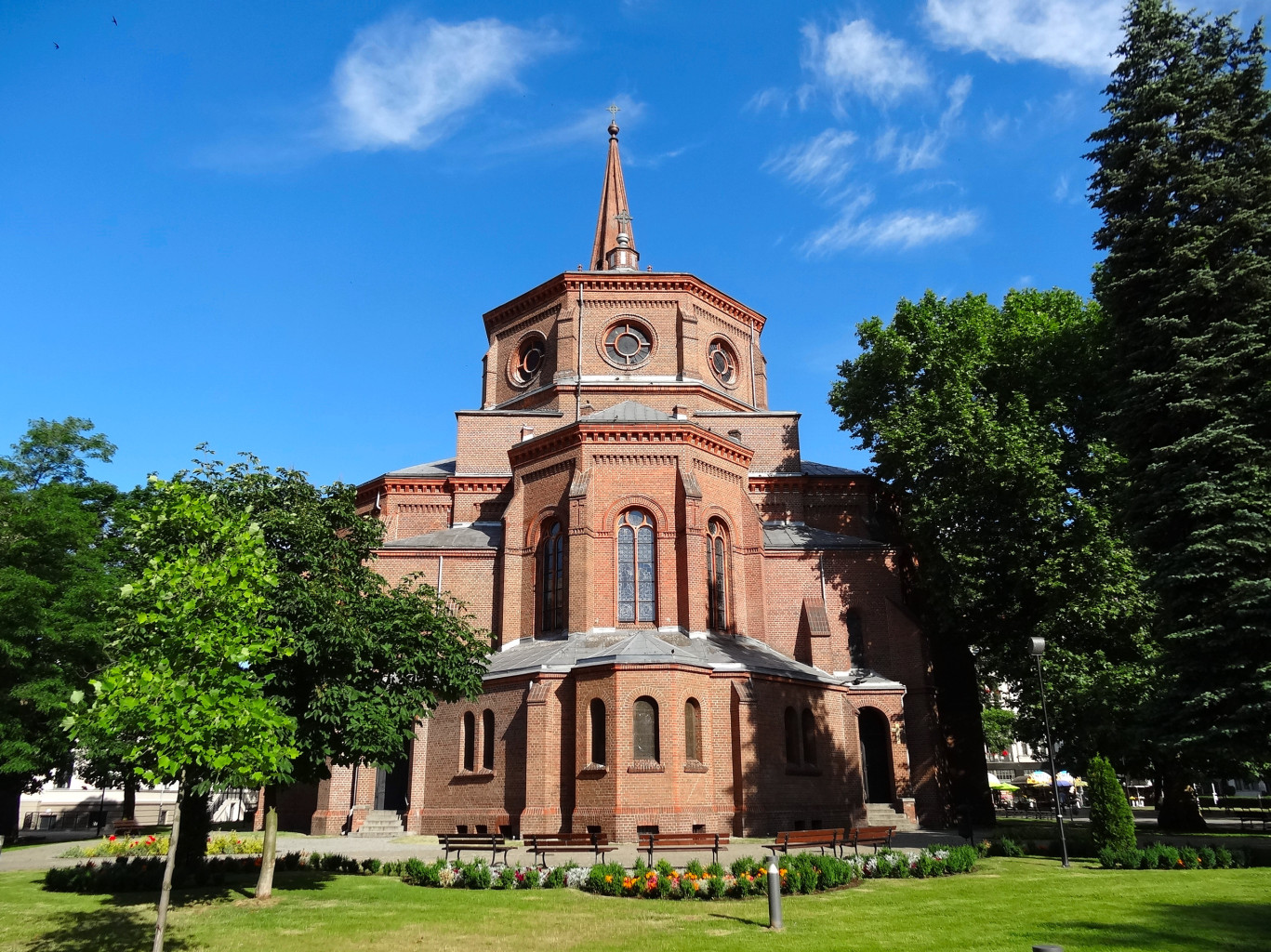
Back view

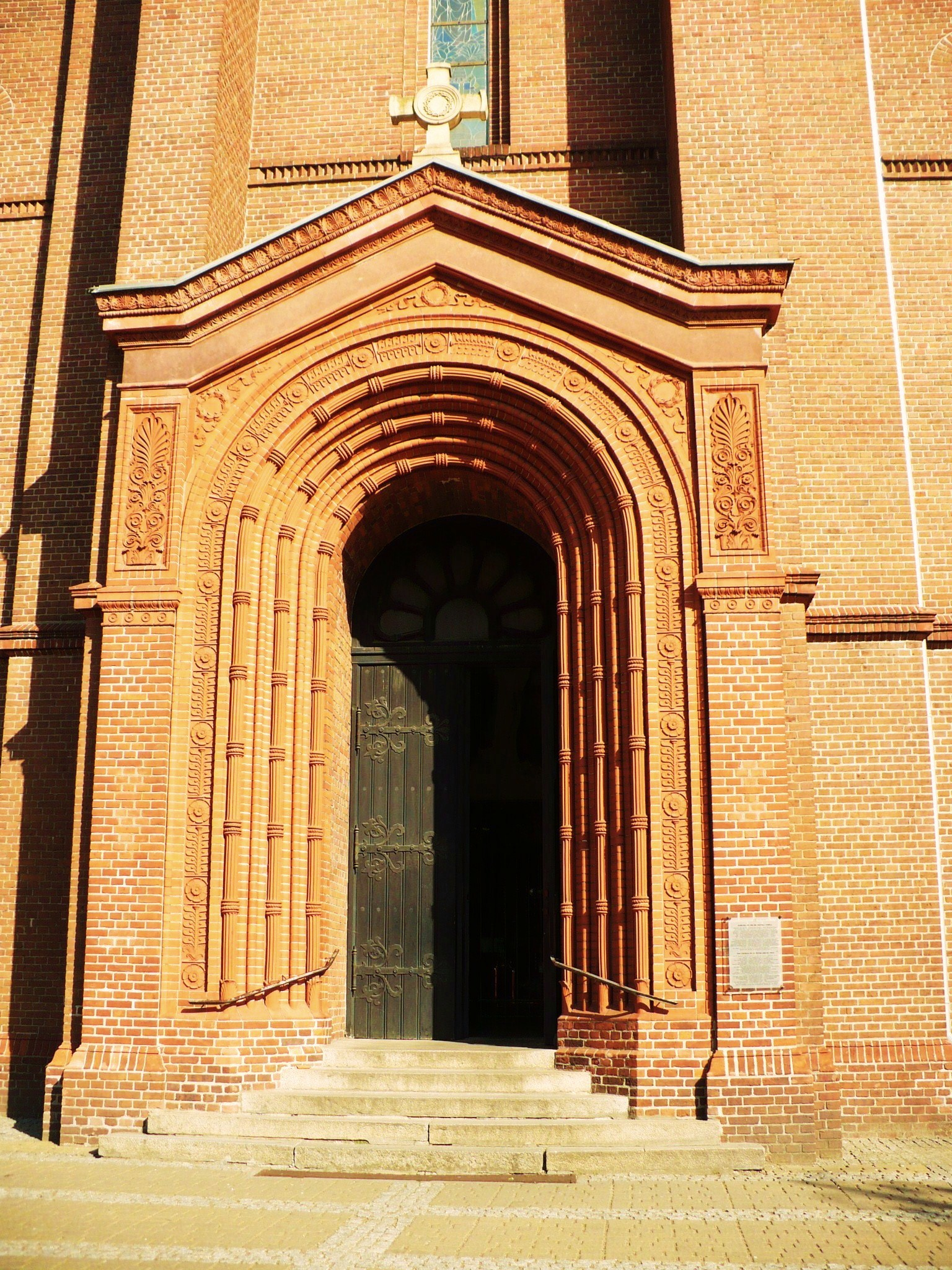
Main portal

=== Tenement at 1 Freedom Square, corner with Gdańsk Street ===
Registered on Kuyavian-Pomeranian Voivodeship heritage list: Nr.601429-Reg.A/1041, 20 October 1990.

Built in 1896–1898 by Józef Święcicki

Eclecticism & Neo-baroque.

One of the most iconic buildings in downtown Bydgoszcz.

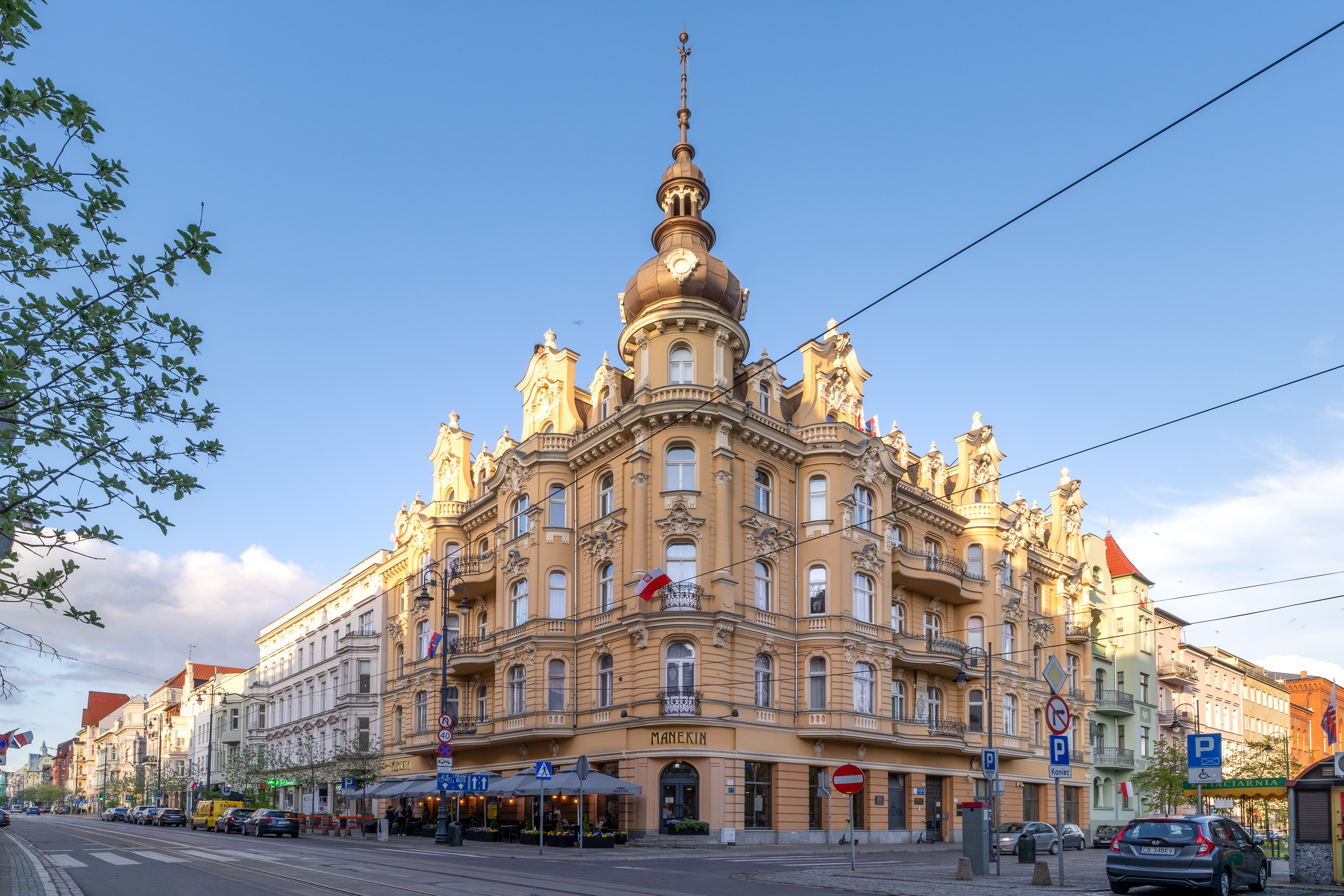
View from Gdańska Street

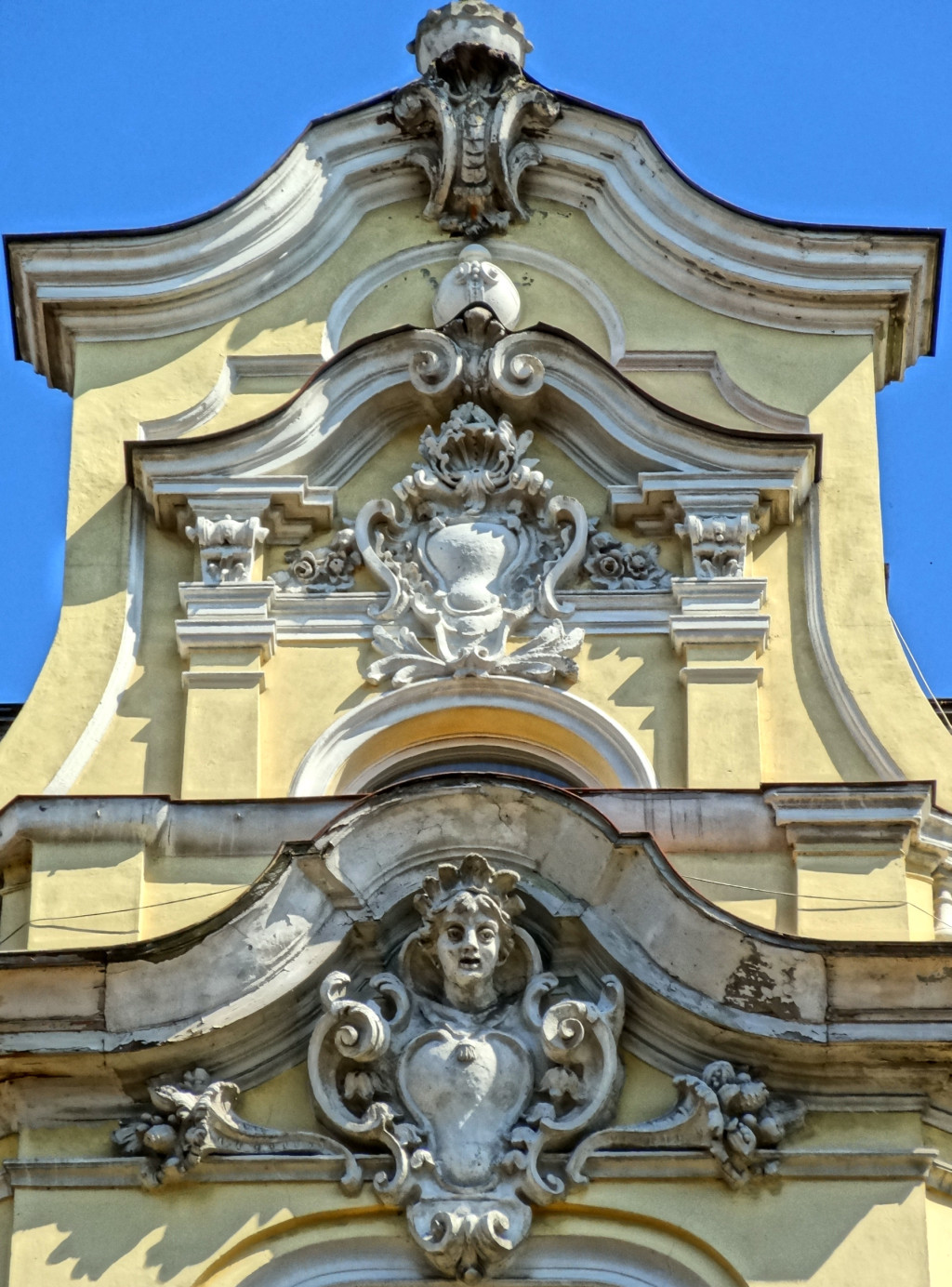
Architectural detail

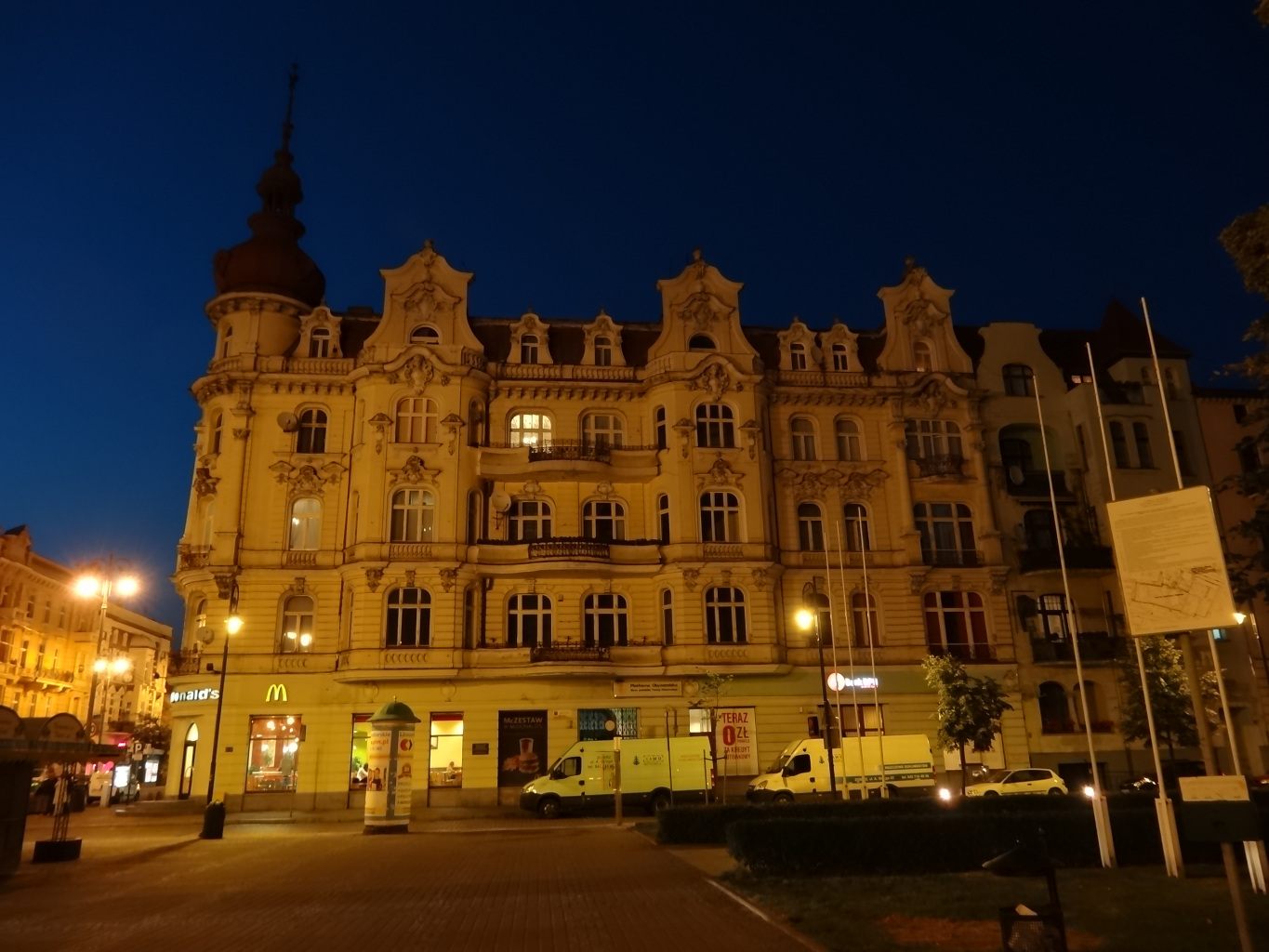
by night, frontage onto Freedom Square

=== Tenement at 21 ===
1850–1875,

Eclecticism & Neoclassicism

Initially referenced at Danzigerstraße 15, its first landlord was Albert Kernke, an hydrant man. In the 1930s, the place hosted a dancing cabaret, the Jockey-Club. In the late 1960s, Kazimierz Borucki, director of the Leon Wyczółkowski Regional Museum (1946–1965) in Bydgoszcz, moved there.

The facade still displays remnants of neoclassical architecture.

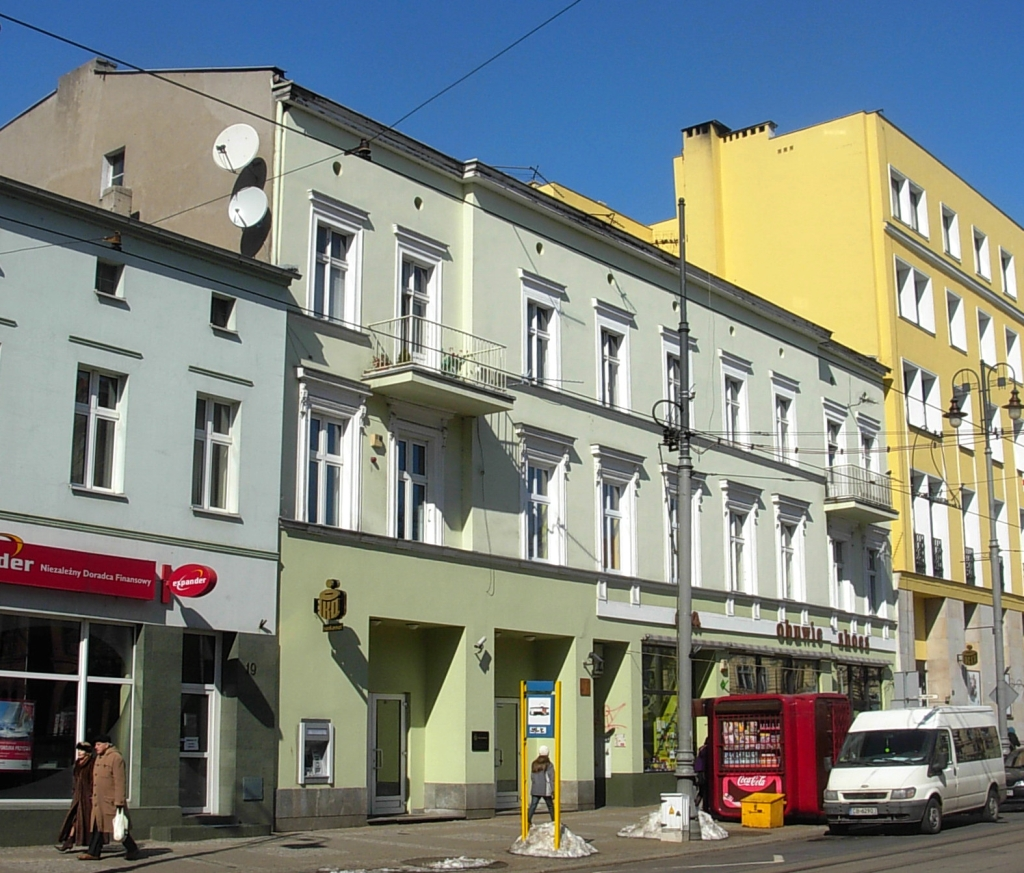
Main elevation from the street

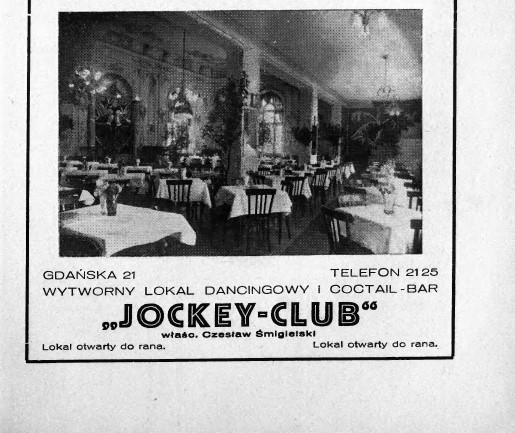
Advertising for the Jockey-Club, ca 1935

=== Tenement at 22 ===
Registered on Kuyavian-Pomeranian Voivodeship heritage list: Nr.601298-Reg.A/987, May 28, 1991.

Built in 1850–1875 by Carl Stampehl and renovated in 1883.

Eclecticism.

A renovation was conducted by architect Rudolf Kern from 1910 to 1911.

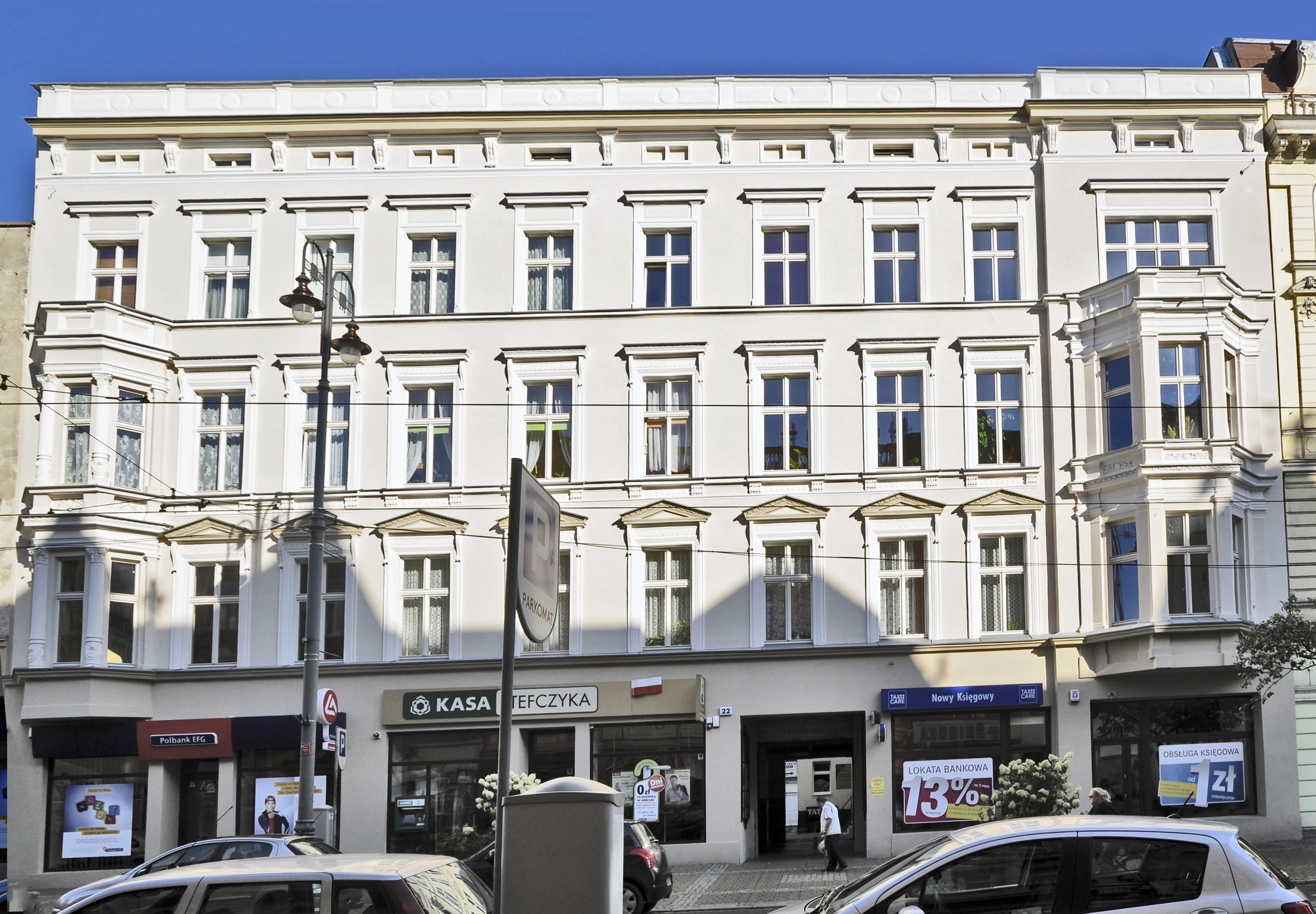
Main frontage

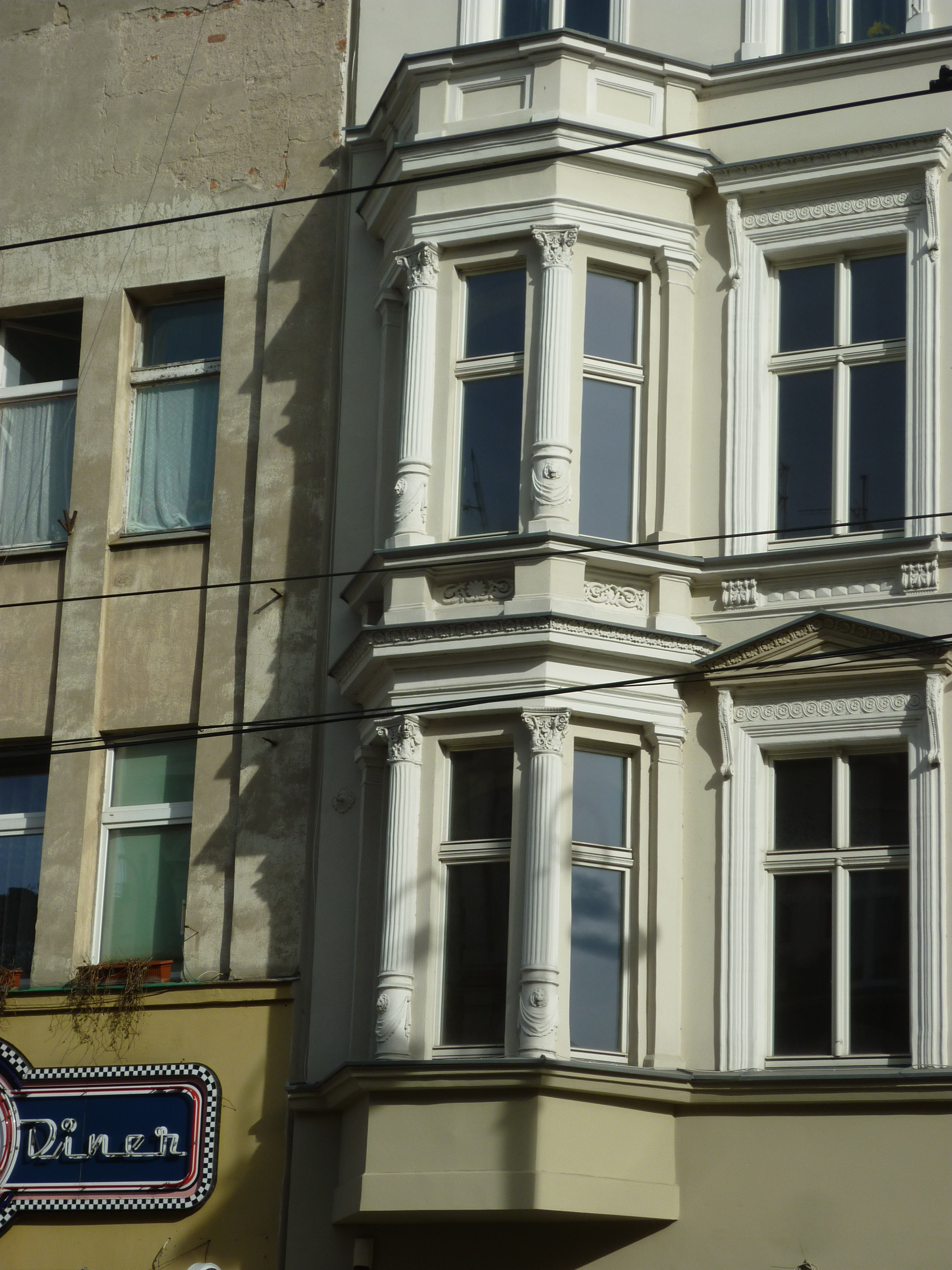
Detail of the motifs on a 3-pane window

=== Tenement at 23 ===
Built between 1947 and 1949

Modern architecture

At the time, the building has been erected especially to house PKO local seat.

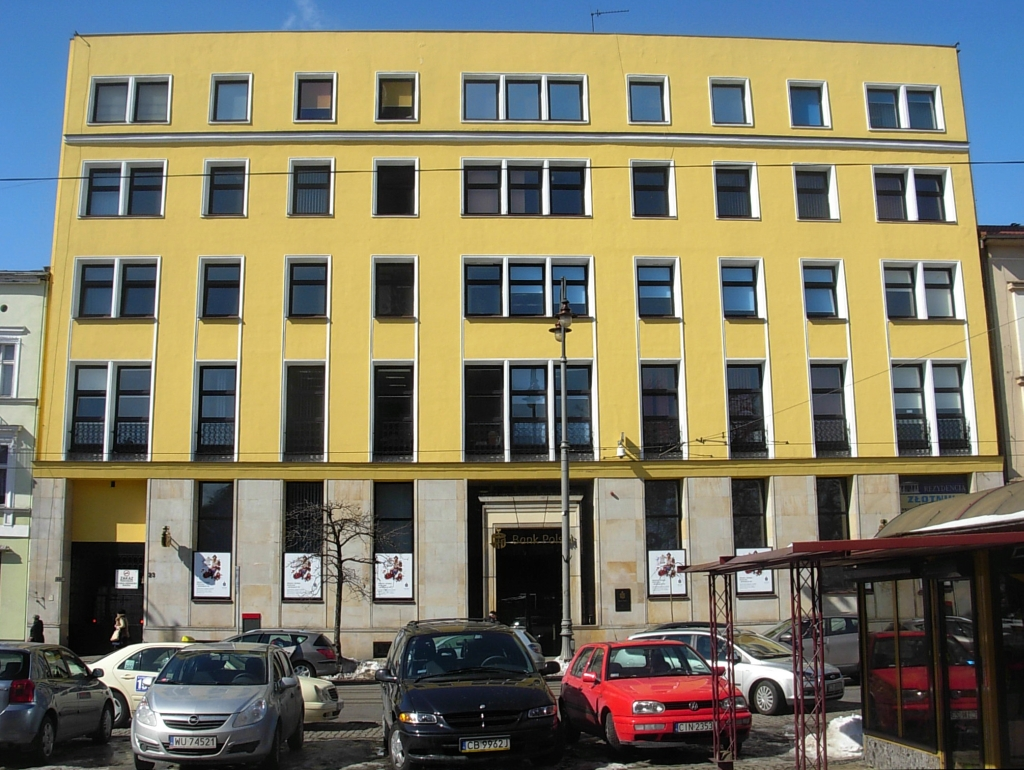
View from Plac Wolności

=== Tenement at 24 ===
Built in 1906-1907 by Rudolf Kern

Eclecticism.

Although devoid of architectural motifs and decoration, the highly simplified shape of the building is a remnant of the one erected in the early 1900s by architect Rudolf Kern, on an order from investor Julius Berger. The building housed the first Music Conservatoire of Bydgoszcz, founded in 1904 by Arnold Schattschneider. Between 1907 and 1920, Bydgoszcz pipe organ builder Paul Voelkner lived there. In 1926, one of the first Polish car dealer and fuel station were set up here, the Ford Butowski Company.

Originally, this five-storey tenement possessed rich Art Nouveau architectural details but has been heavily destroyed by a fire in 1945. The facade underwent a thorough restoration in 2018.

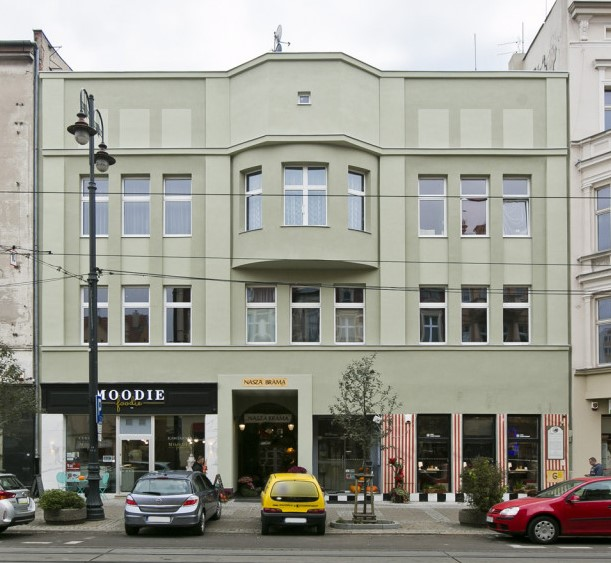
Renovated frontage

=== Tenement at 25 ===
1850–1875.

Eclecticism.

The tenement at was first own by Carl Weißemborn, a judge: address was then Danzigerstraße 18. On December 25, 1909, Wacław Szkaradkiewicz opened here a 360-seat movie theatre, called Corso, then Bałtyk in 1932.

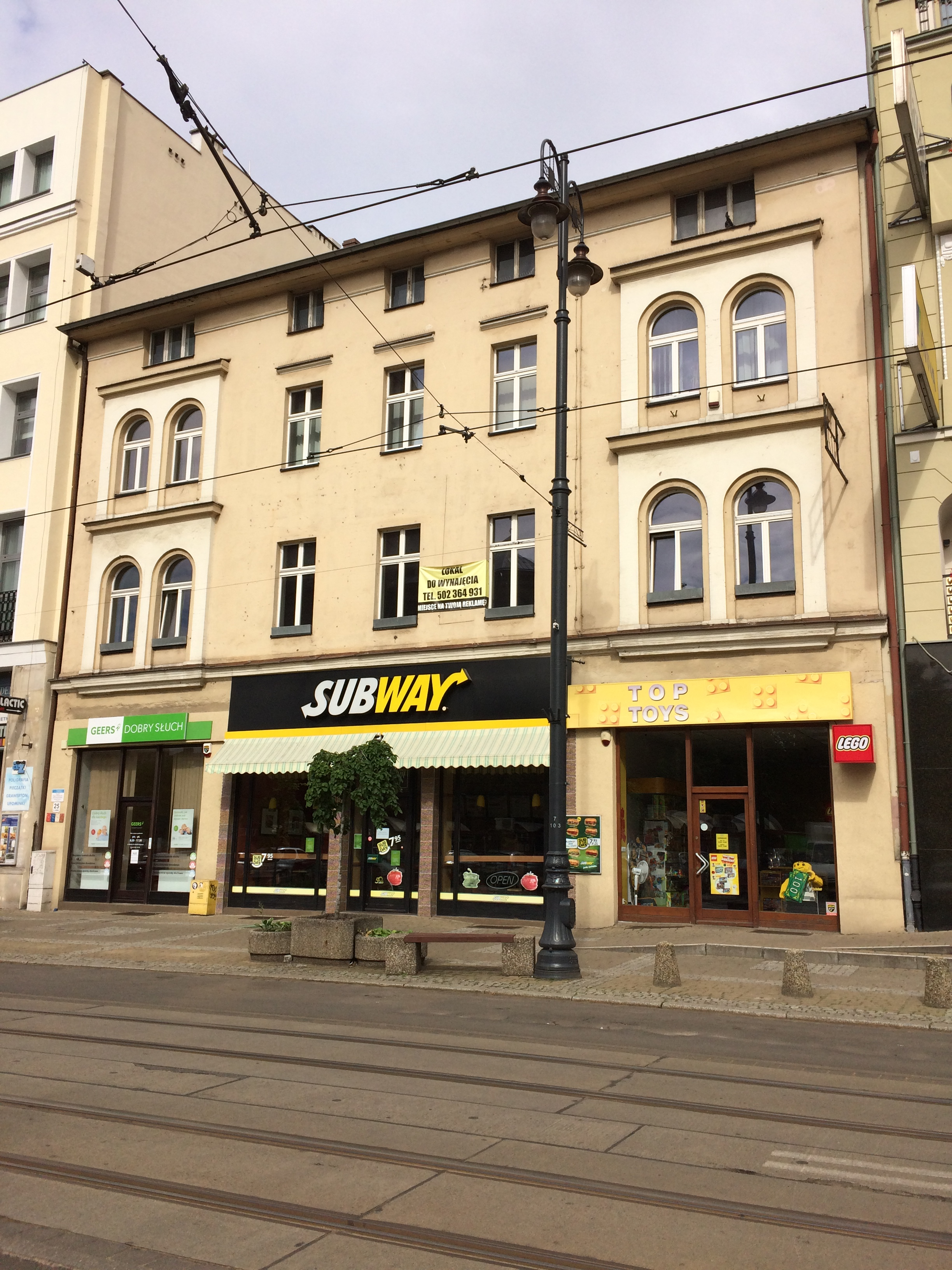
Main elevation

=== Tenement at 26 ===
Early 20th century

Eclecticism.

First owner at then Danzigerstraße 157 was Ernst Winkler, an upholsterer, running the company Winkler & Hübner.

The whole facade decoration has been lost. One can still notice the wrought iron balcony and the renovated iron cast portal located at the bottom of the left avant-corps.

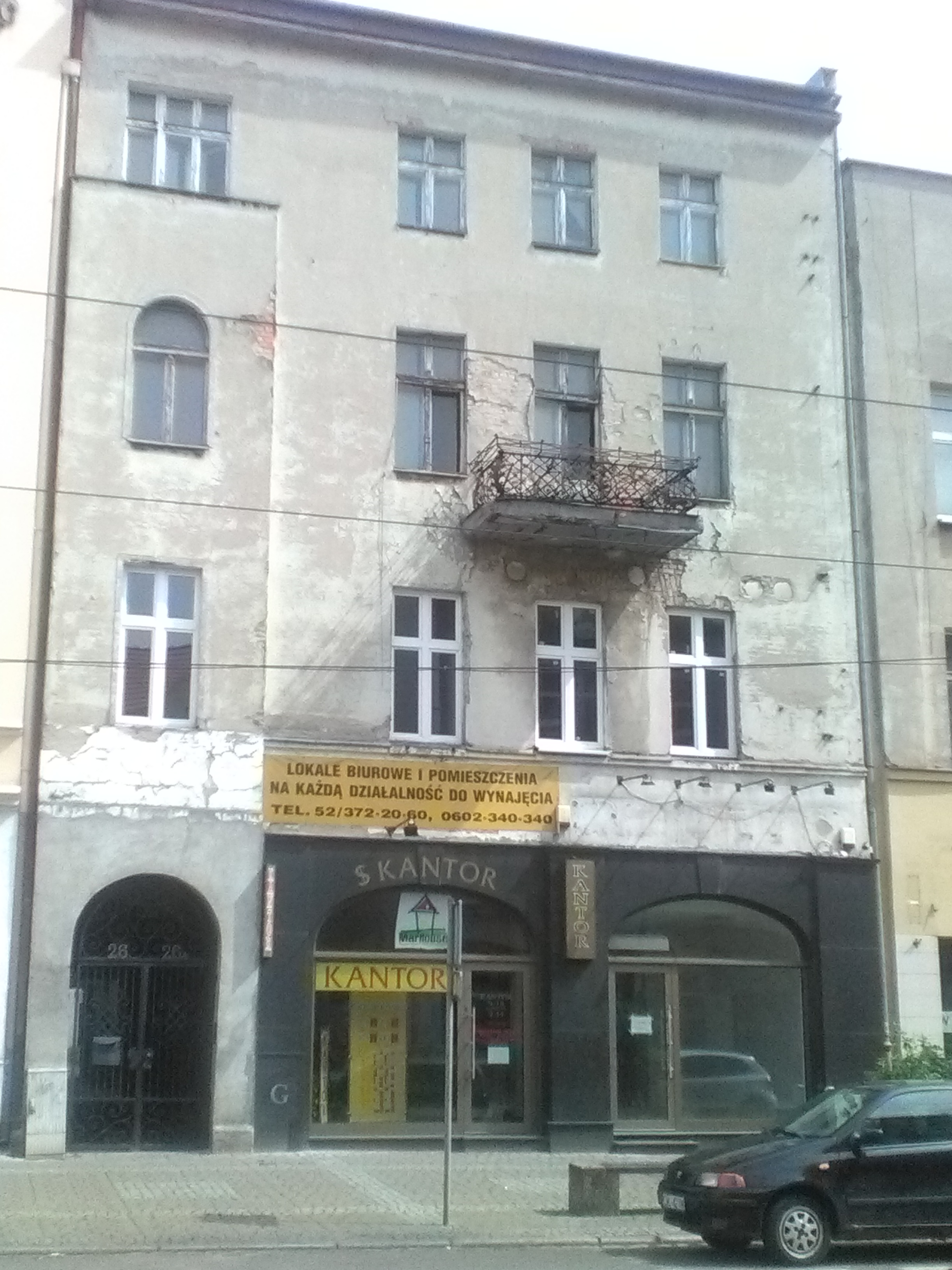
Main elevation

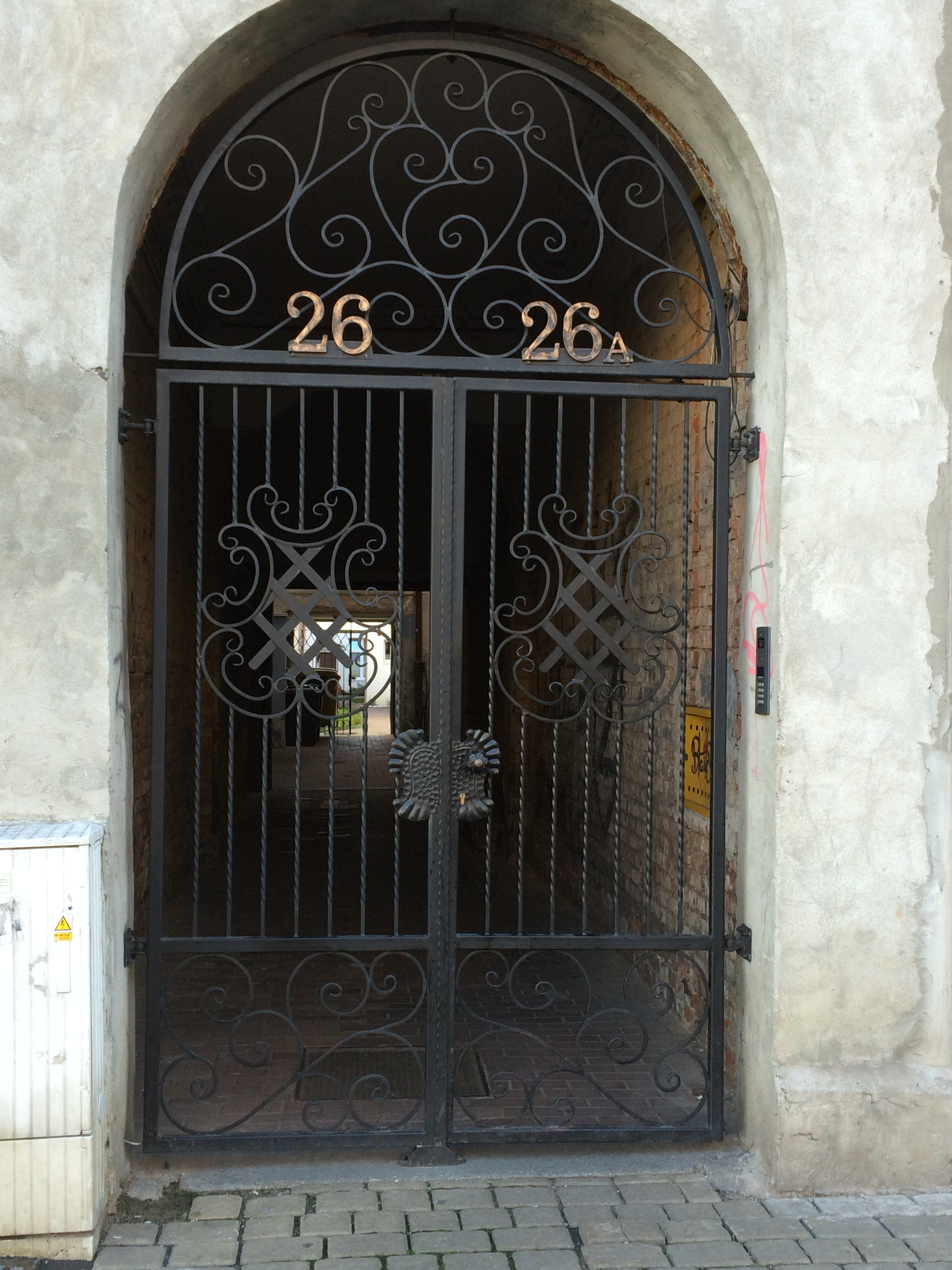
Street gate

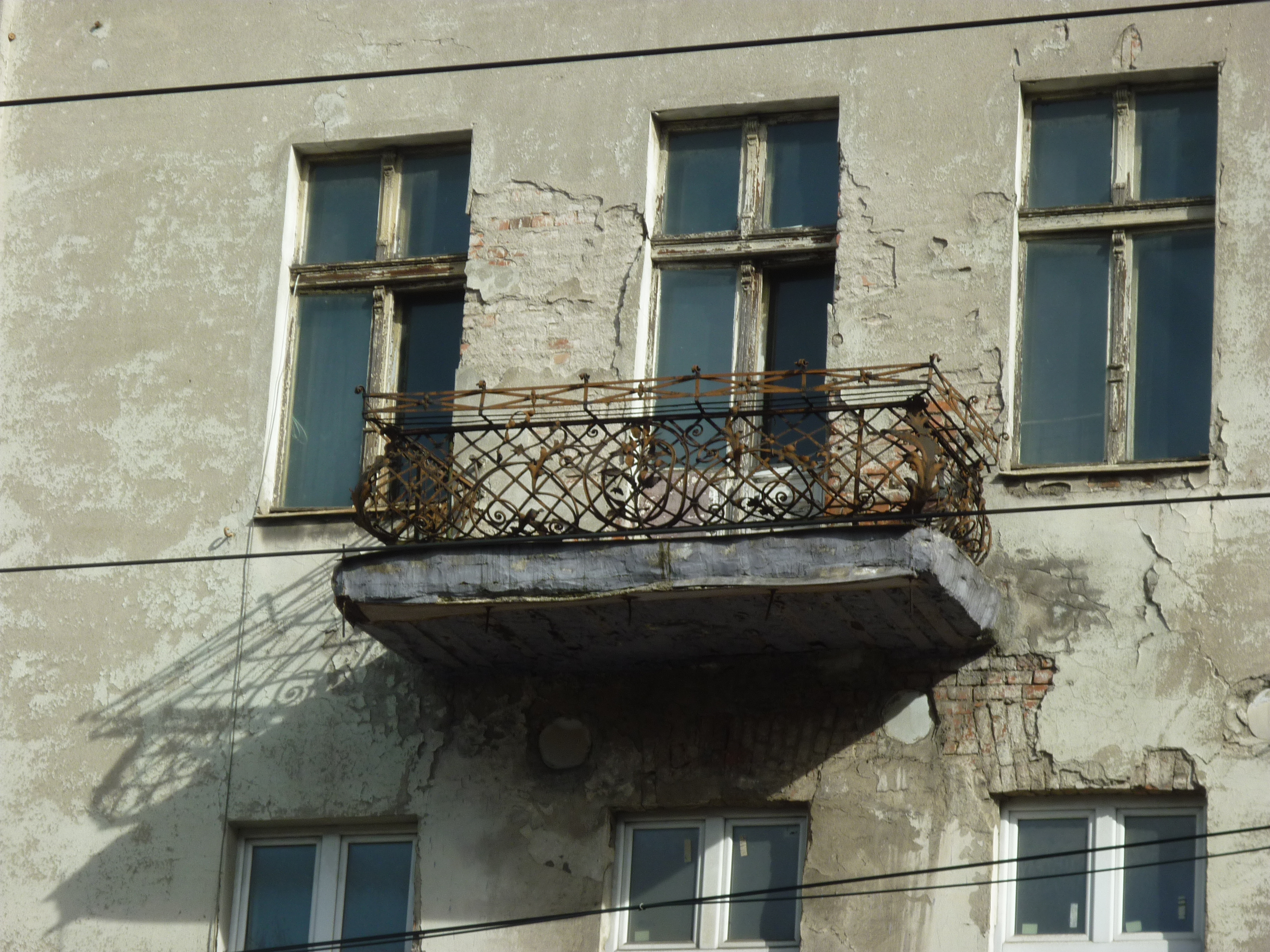
Facade balcony

=== Carl Meinhardt Tenement, at 27 ===
Built in 1908-1909 by Alfred Schleusener and renovated in 1974 and 2003

Modern architecture.

In 1934, a statue adorning the summit of the façade fell and killed two people. A major restoration of the building has been carried out in 2003.

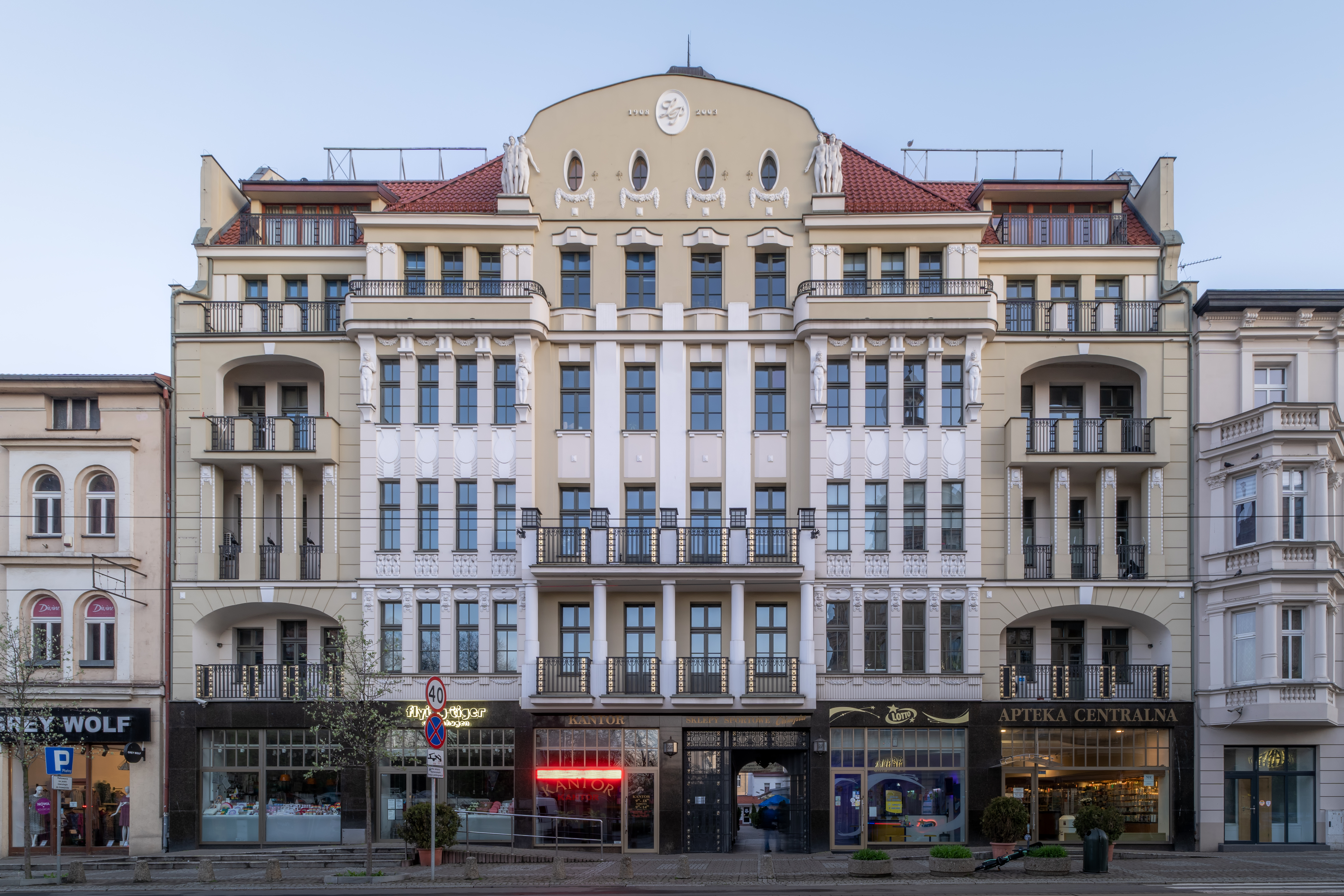
Main façade. Nr.27

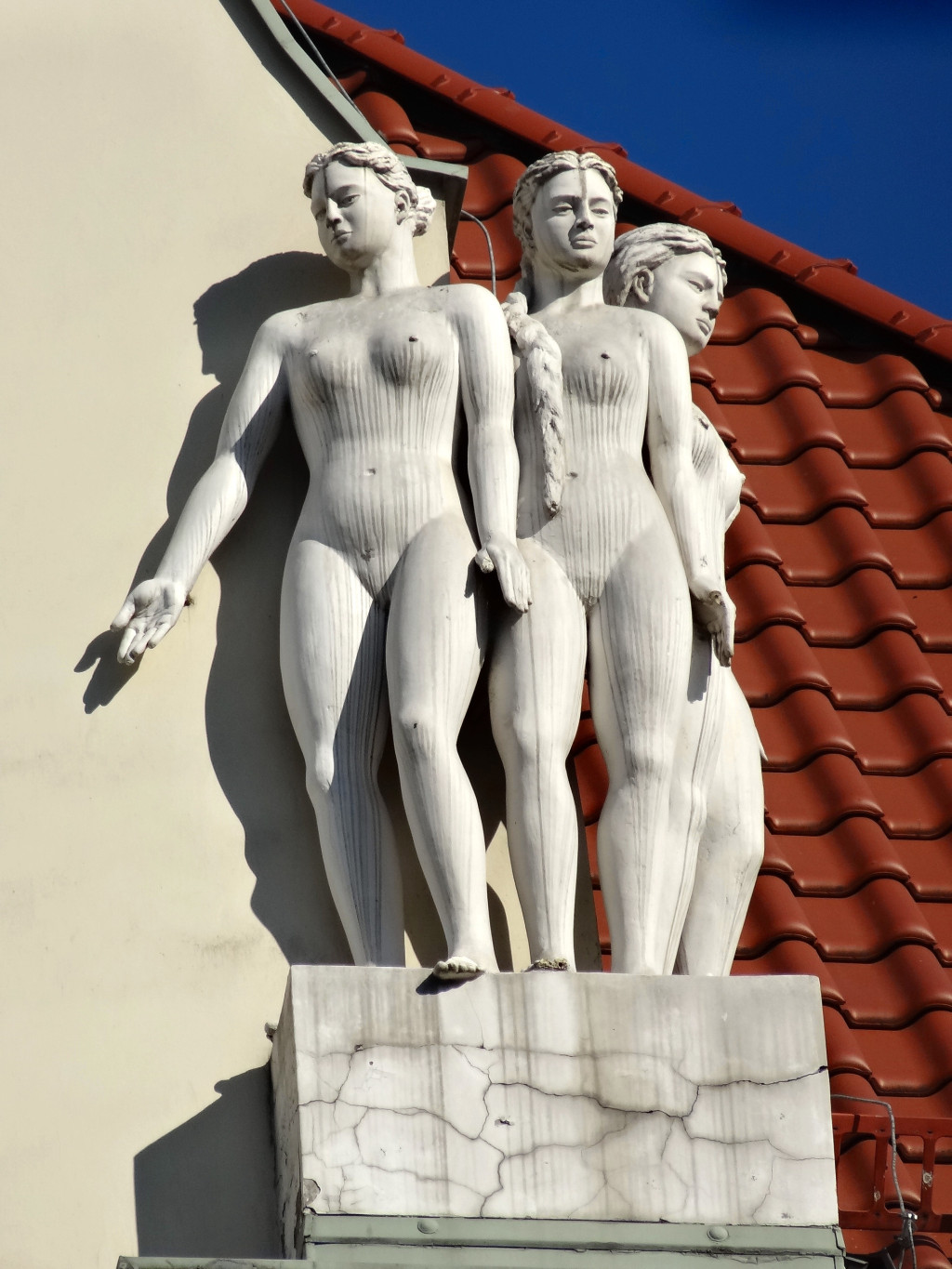
Detail of statues

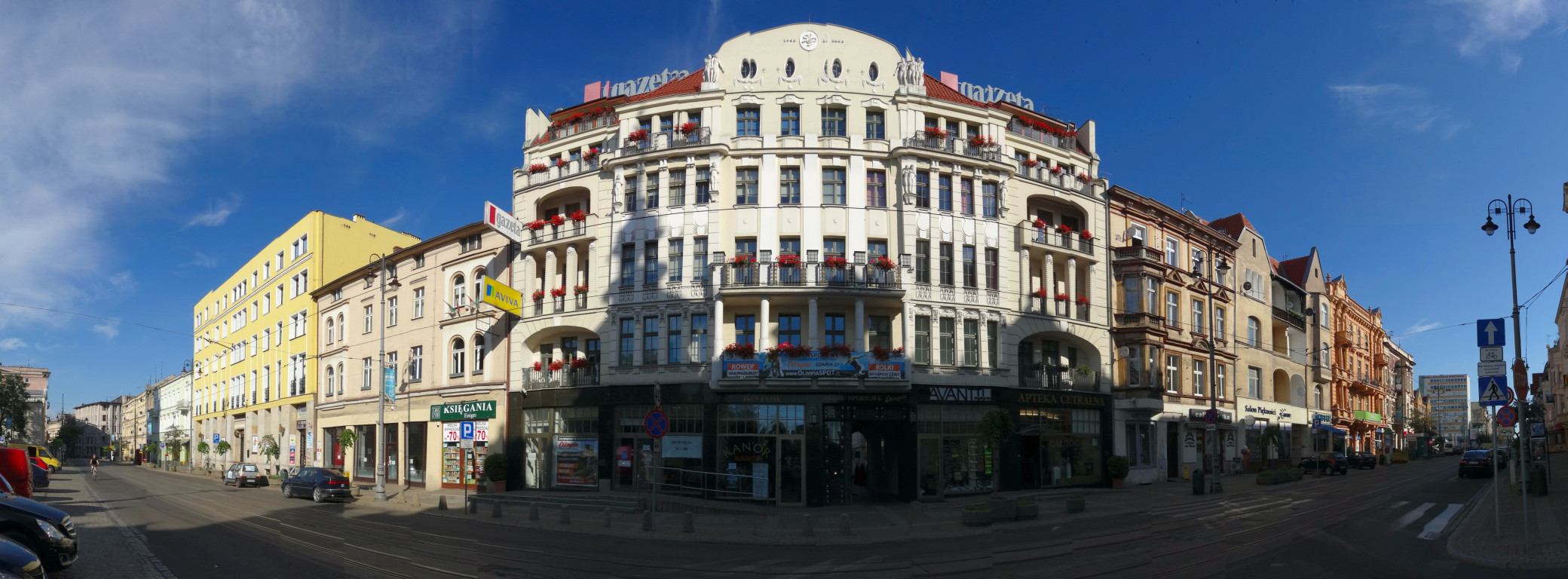
Panorama

=== Thomas Frankowski Tenement, at 28 ===
Registered on Kuyavian-Pomeranian Voivodeship heritage list: Nr.748678-Reg.A/1582, February 16, 2011

Built in 1897–1898 by Fritz Weidner

German historicism.

The house was commissioned by Thomas Frankowski, a rentier. Architectural style displays forms of German historicism, in a transitional phase between the eclecticism and secession.

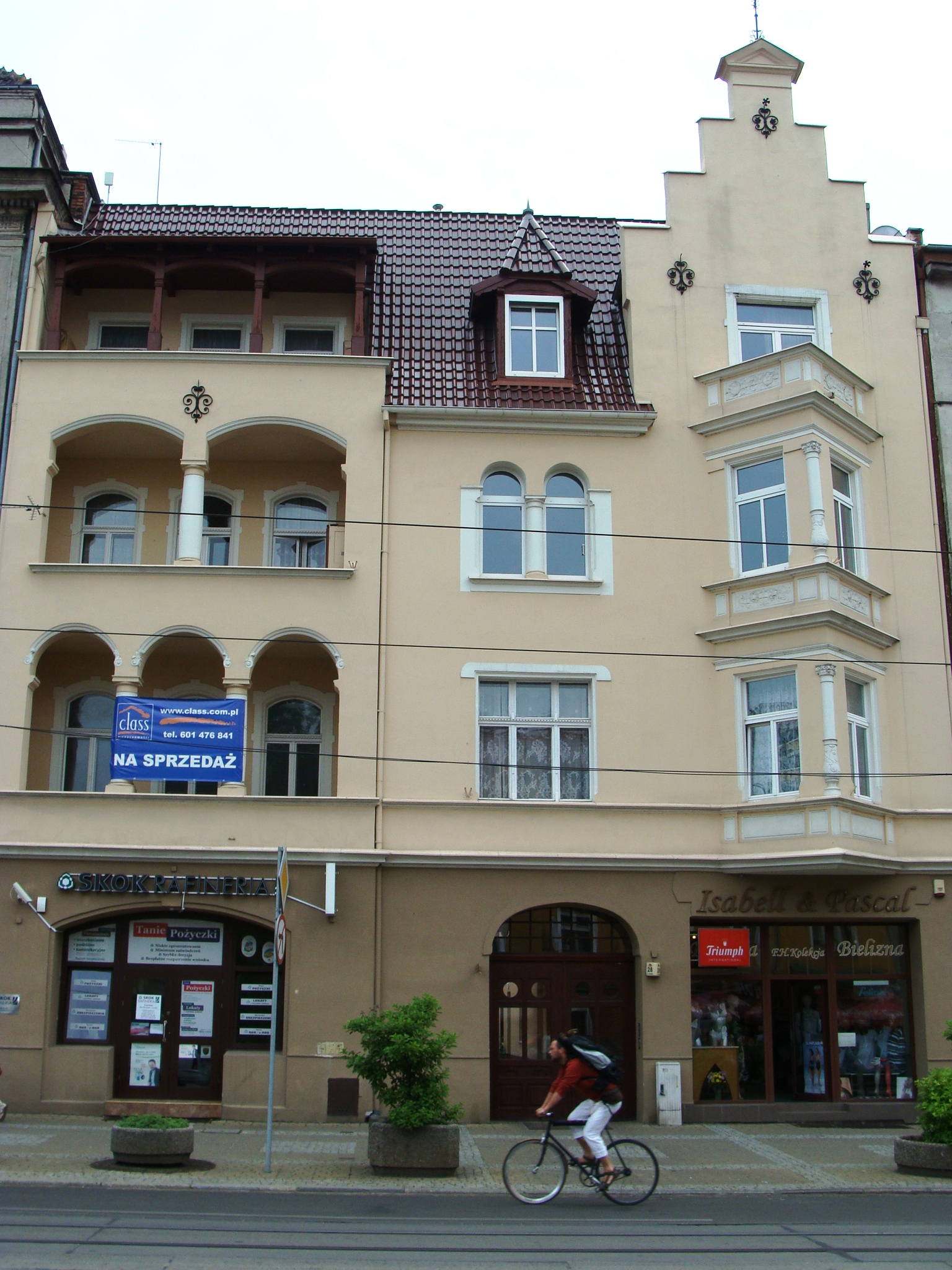
Main facade

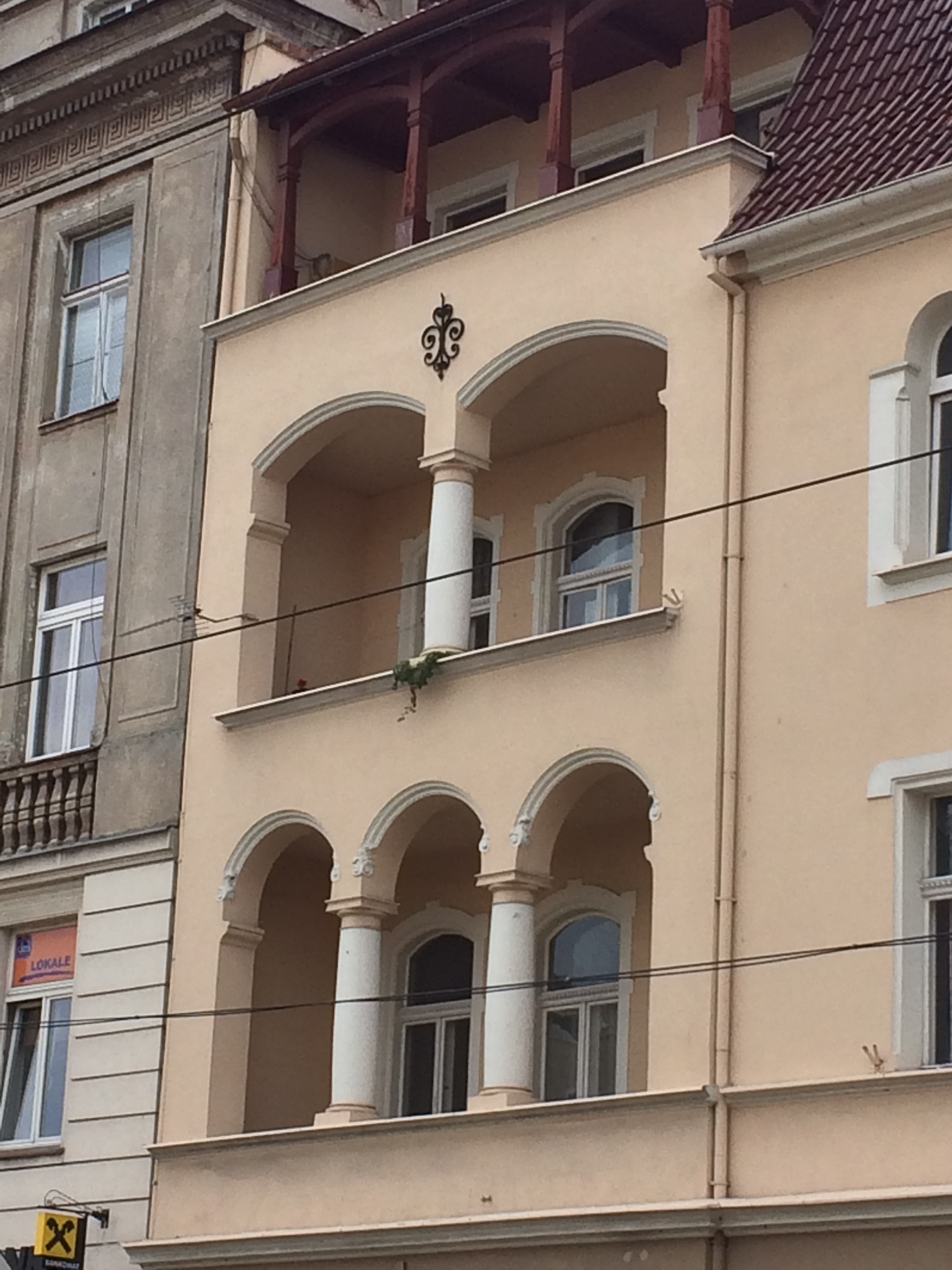
Detail of loggias

=== Tenement at 29 ===
1880s

Eclecticism

The left part of the facade is adorned with a two-story bay window enclosed in pilasters and columns with Corinthian capitals. The building is topped by a cornice supported by massive corbels.

At the end of the 19th century, George Sikorski ran his barber business there. In April 1924, it was the first place Józef Weyssenhoff, a Polish writer, novelist, poet, literary critic, publisher, lived in when he moved from Warsaw.

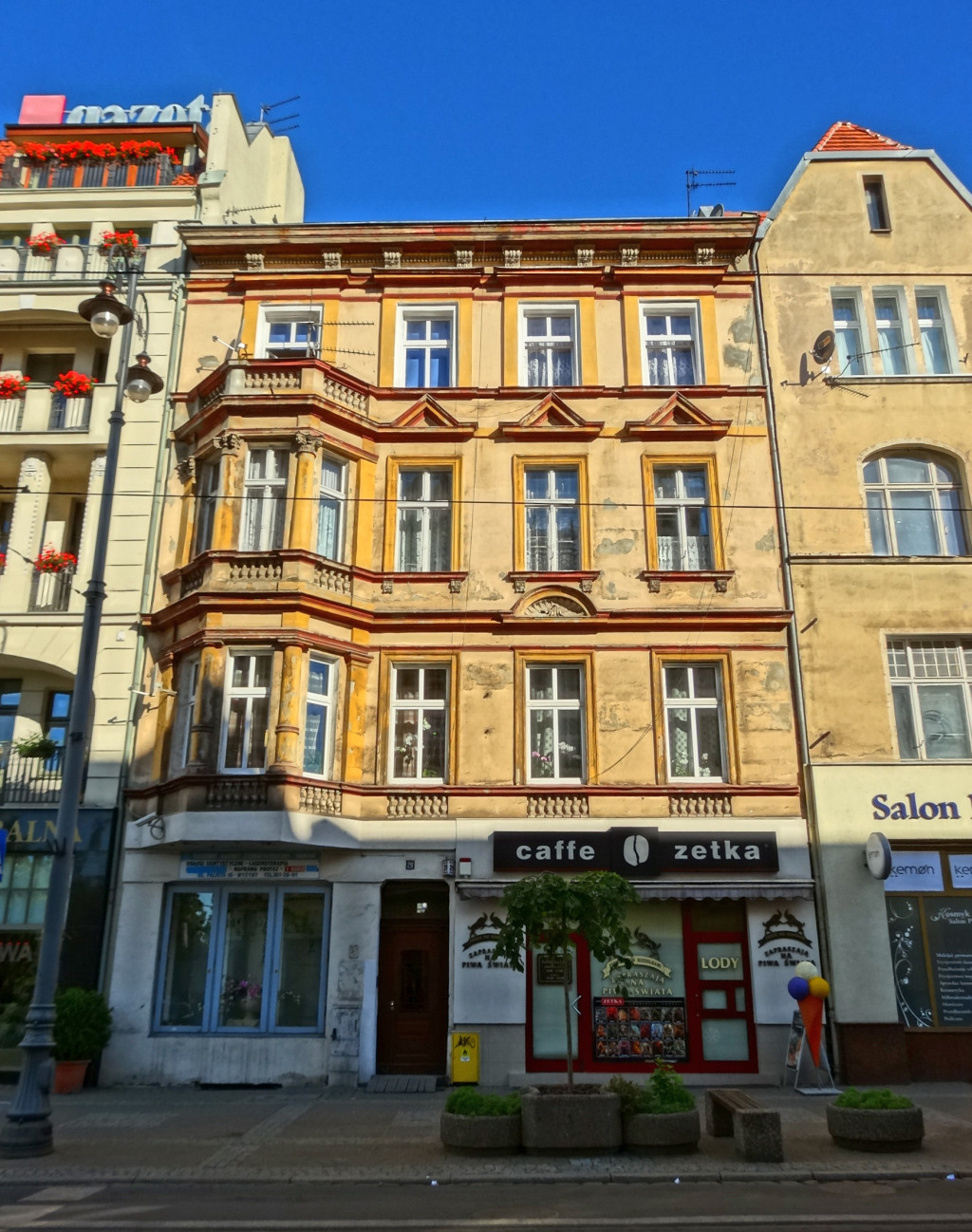
Main facade

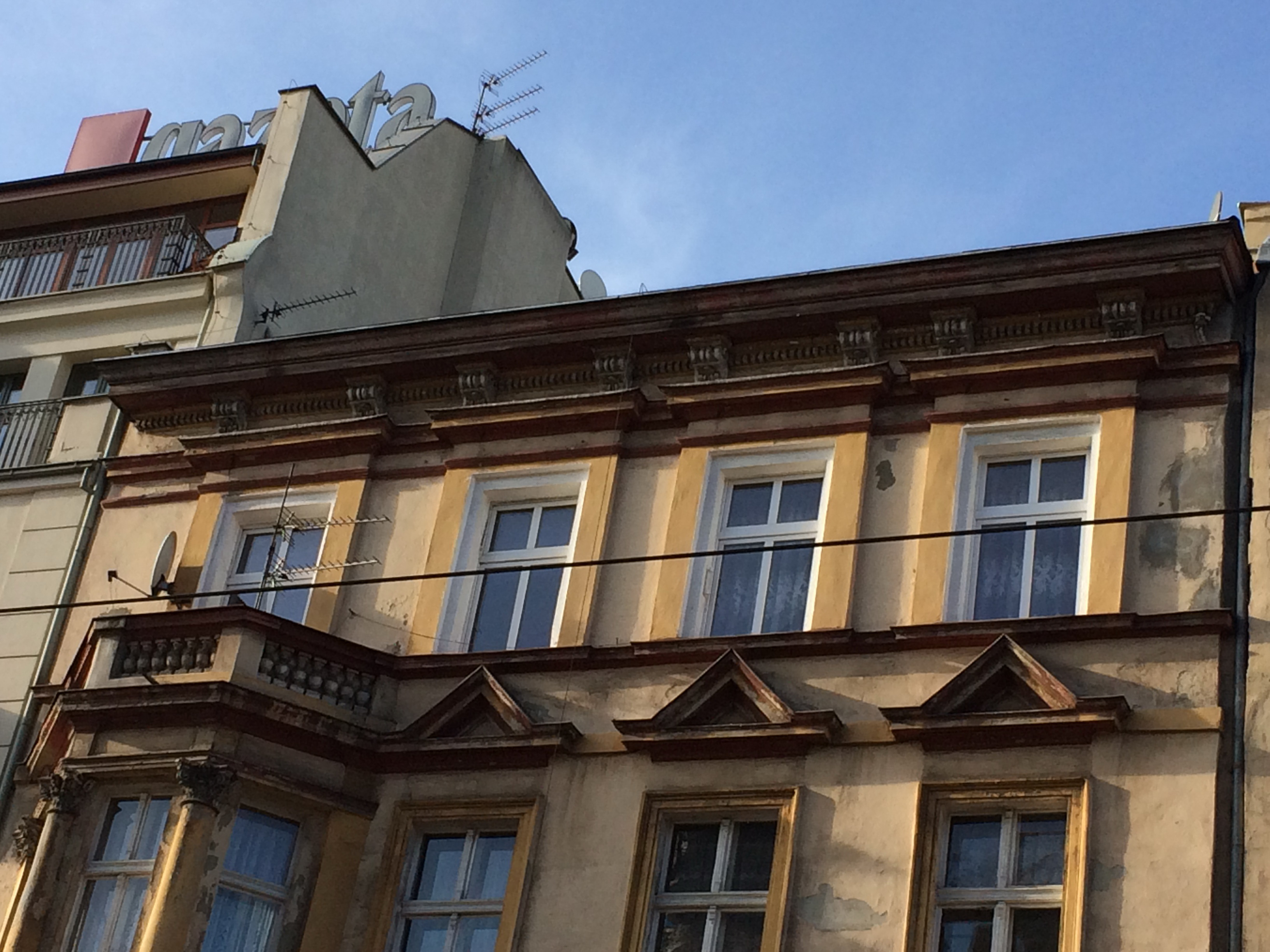
Detail of the facade

=== Oskar Ewald Tenement at 30, corner with Krasiński Street ===
Built in 1895–1896 by Józef Święcicki

Eclecticism.

The top floor housed originally Oskar Ewald's photographic studio.

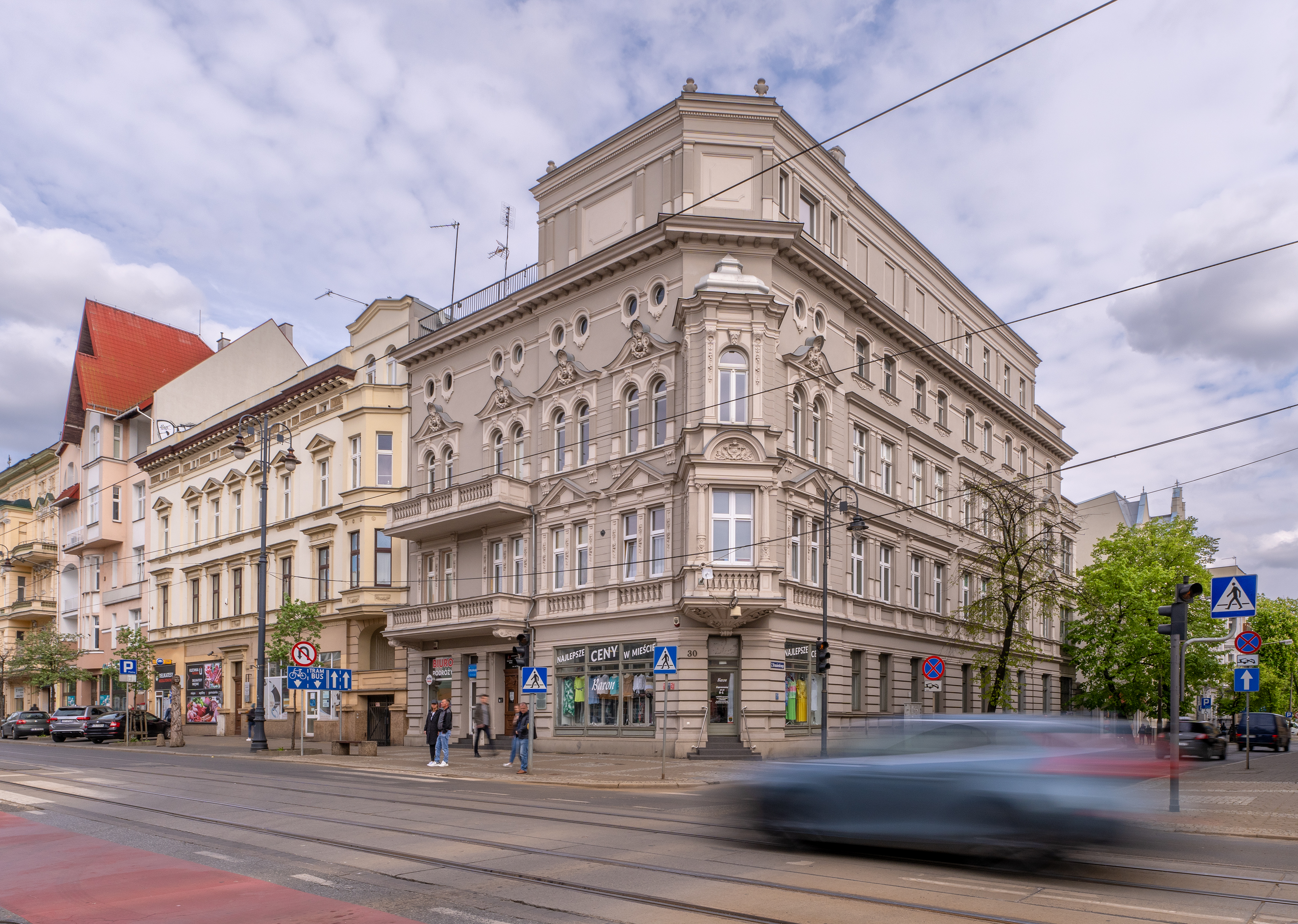
View from Gdańska Street

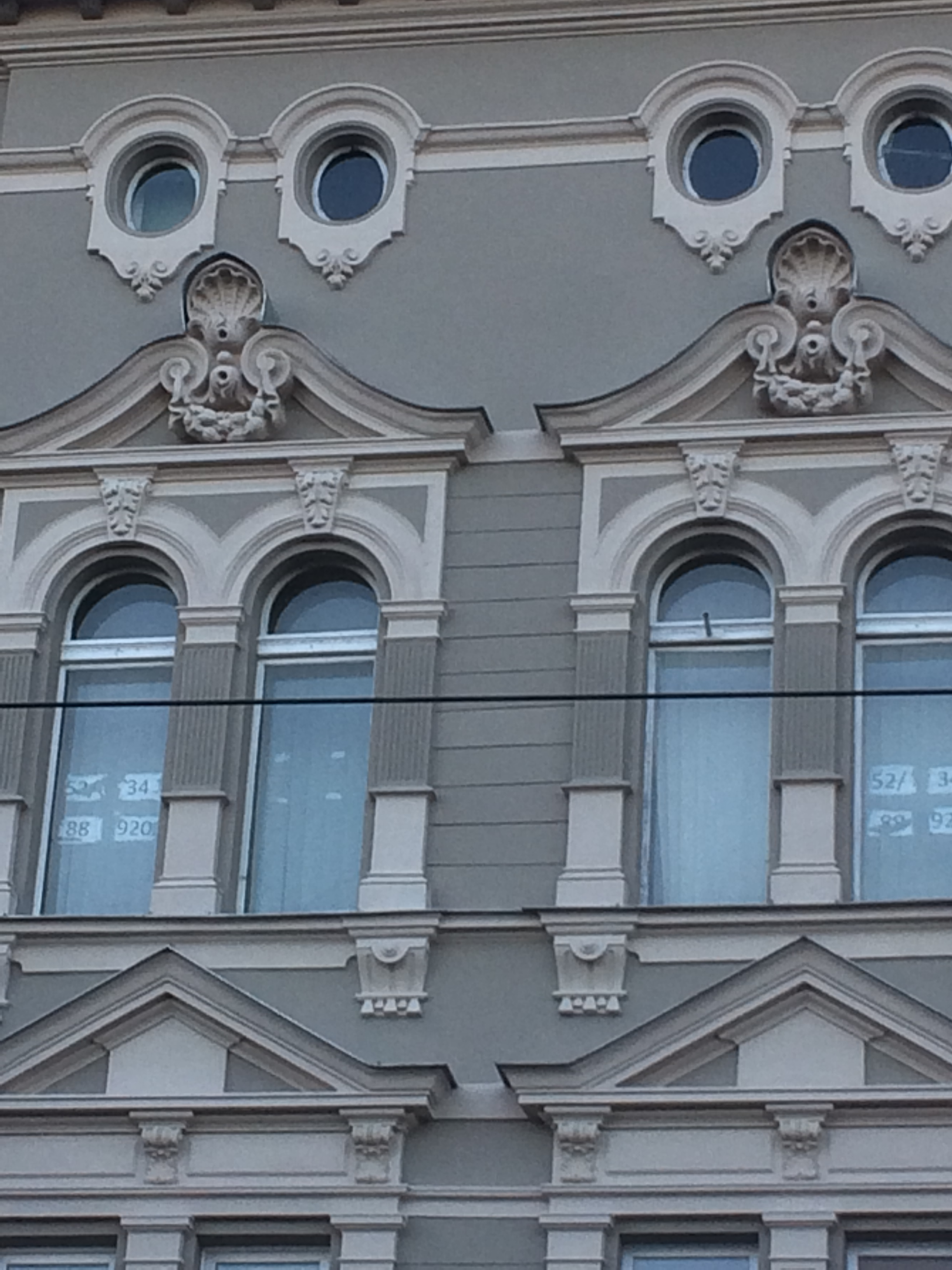
Architectural detail

=== George Sikorski Tenement at 31 ===
Built in 1902–1903, by Fritz Weidner

German Historicism.

This building was commissioned by George Sikorski as a habitation house.

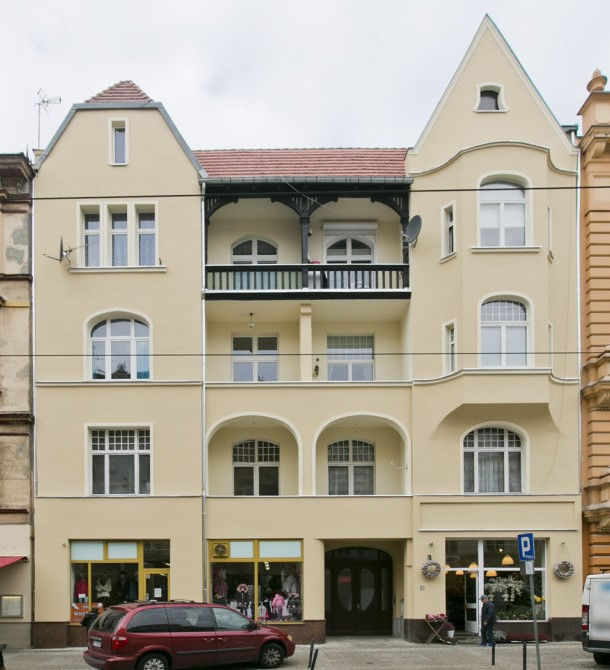
Main facade

=== Hermann Berndt Tenement, at 32 ===
Built in 1881, and 1910–1911 by Erich Lindenburger

Eclecticism & Neo-Renaissance

Hermann Berndt, a master carpenter owner of the plot had the original house built around 1881. He commissioned, in 1899, an expansion to the south, adding the gate and bay windows with loggias. The house was refitted again in 1910–1911, on a design by Erich Lindenburger, as requested by new landlord Leo Venske.

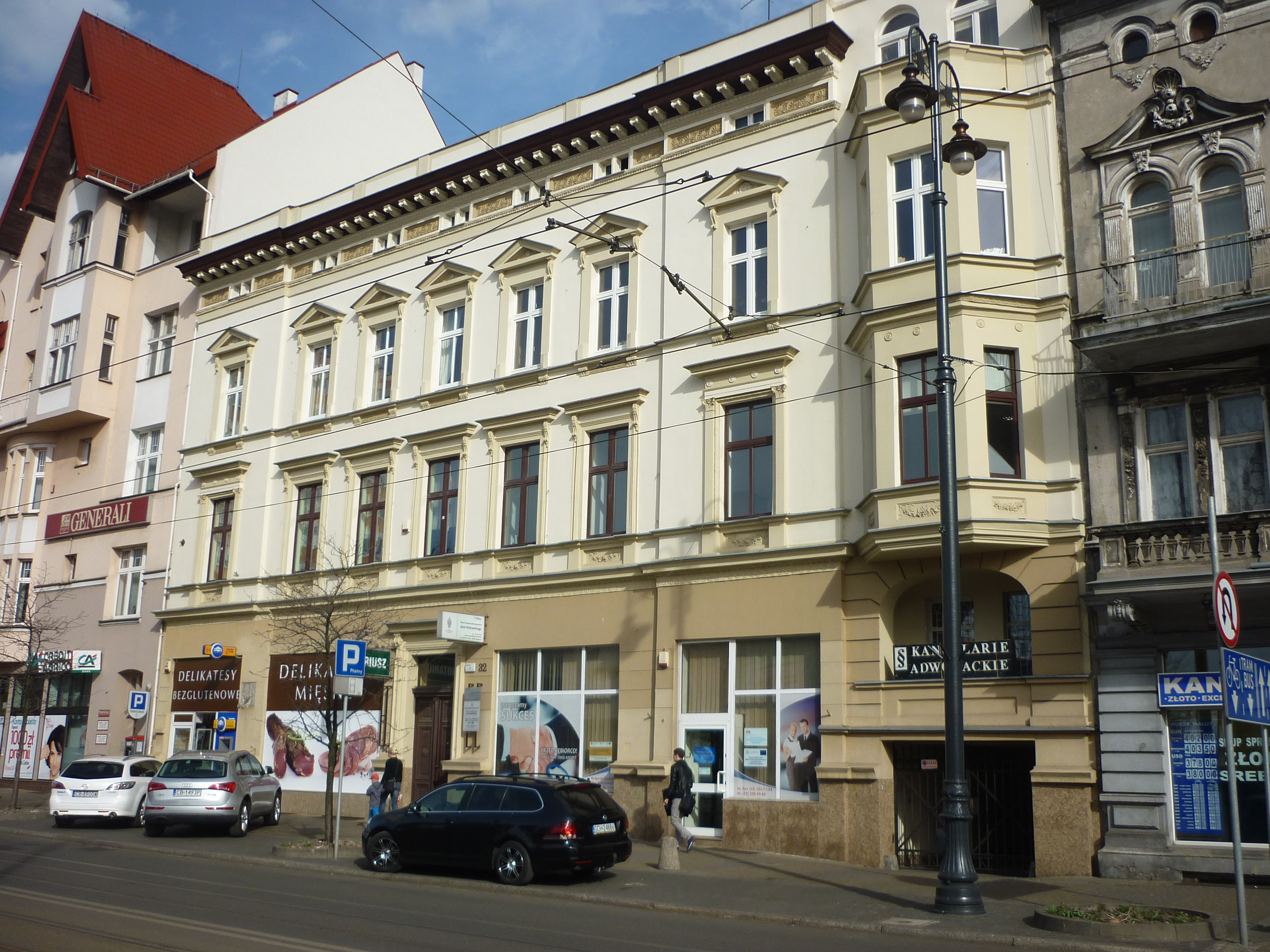
Main facade

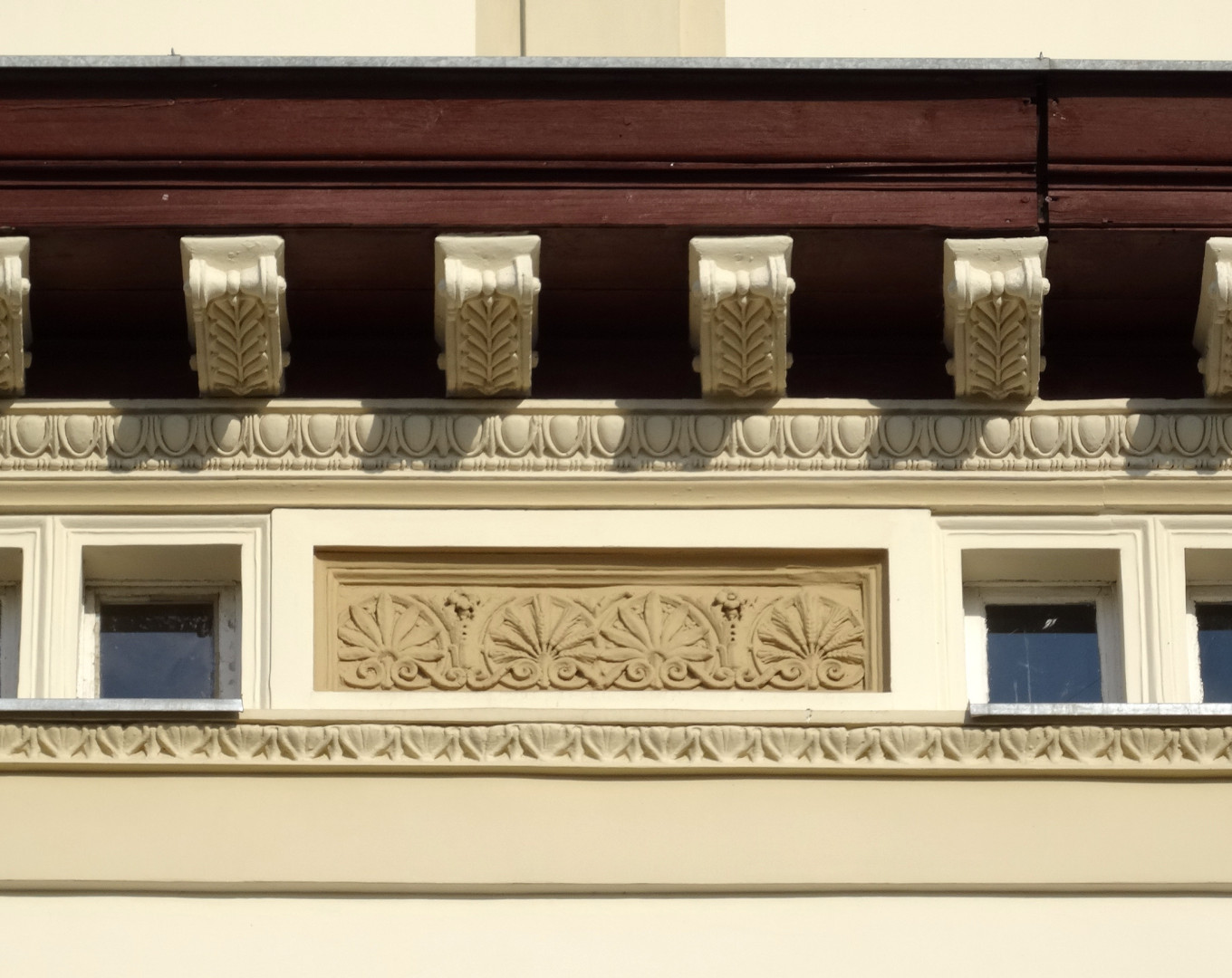
Detail of corbels and cartouche

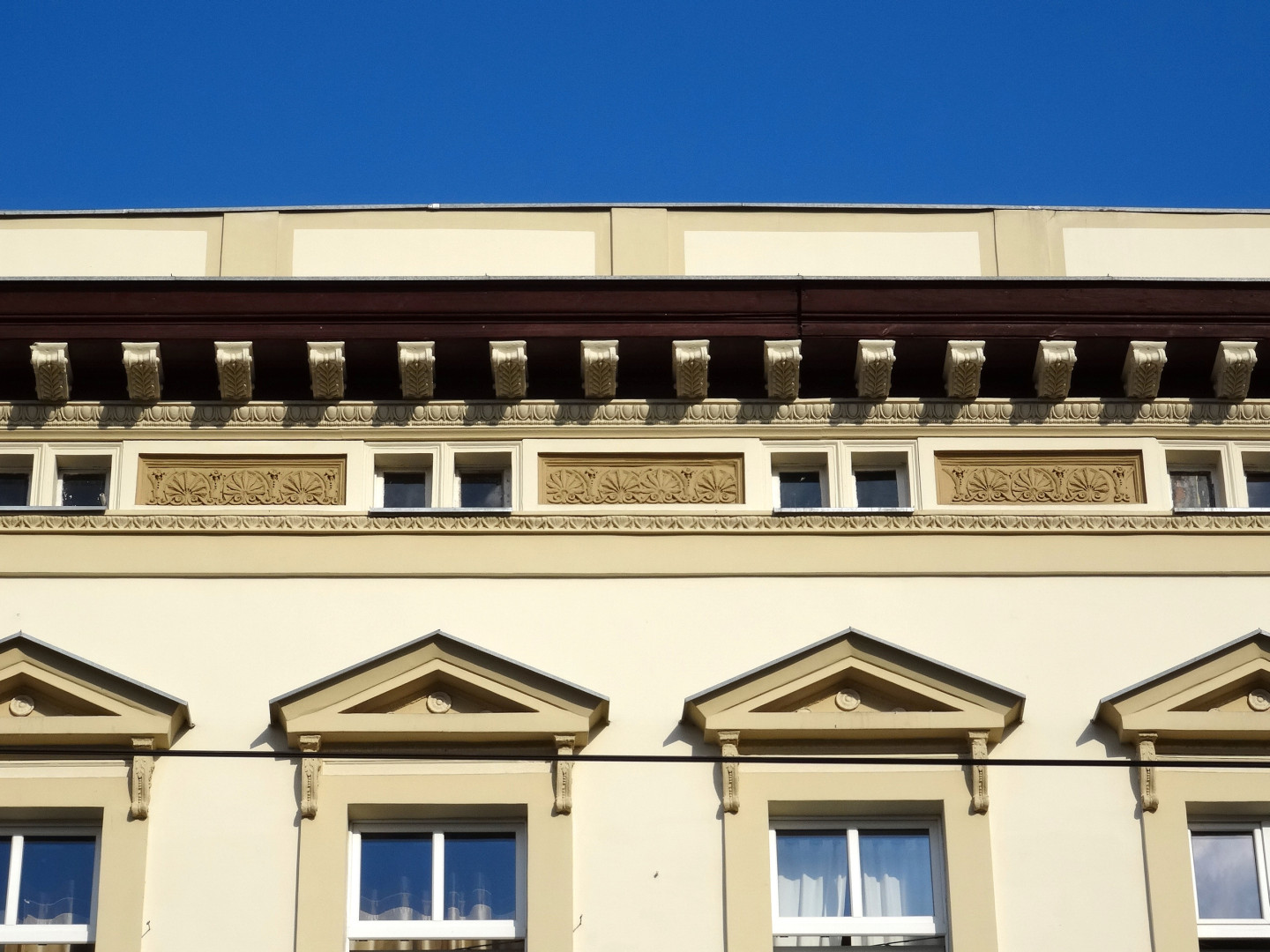
View of upper floor decoration

=== Tenement at 33 ===
Registered on Kuyavian-Pomeranian Voivodeship heritage list, Nr.601300-Reg.A/742, January 15, 1986.

Built in 1876–1878

Eclecticism & Neo-Baroque.

The facade is highly decorated, echoing in a way the facing building.

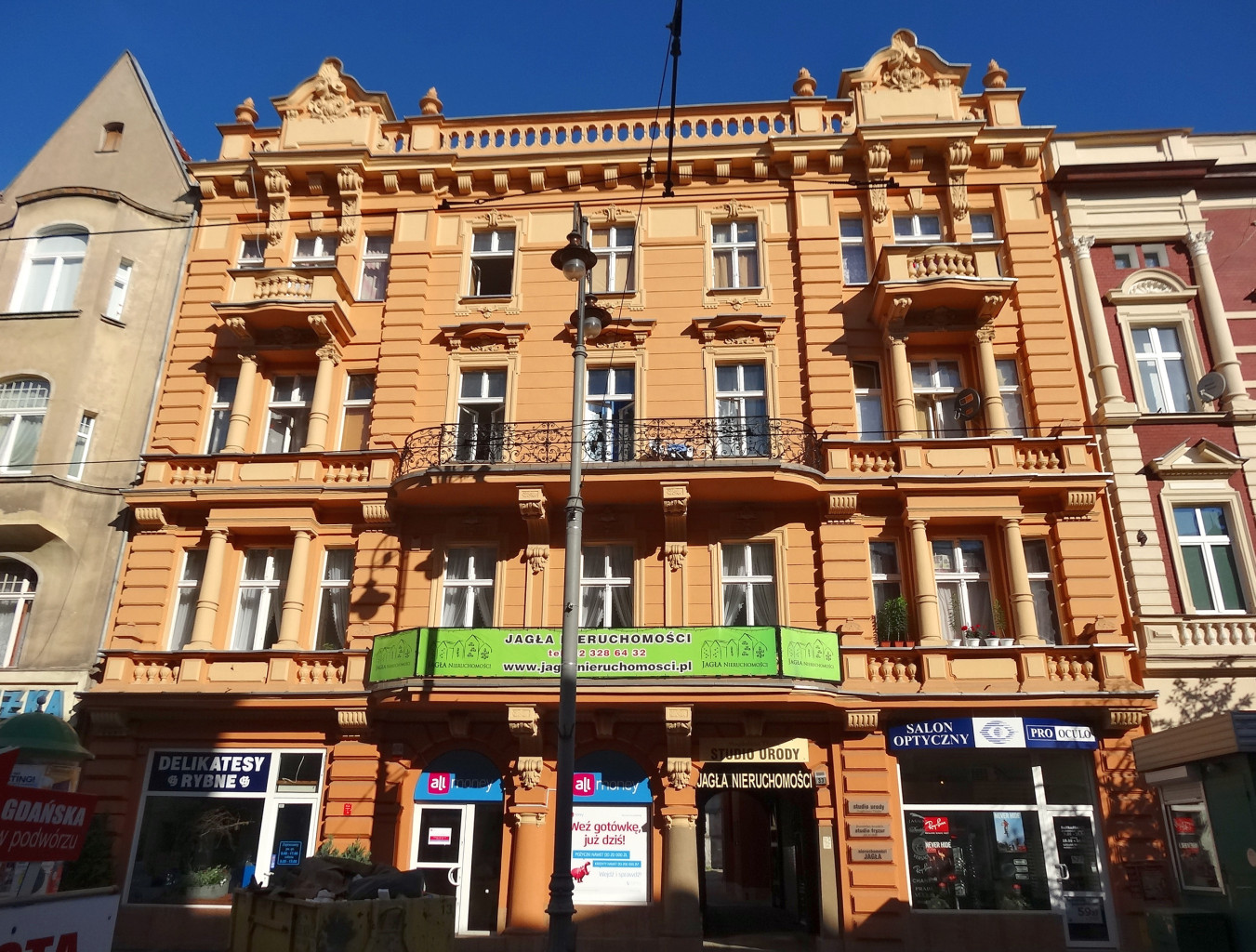
Main frontage

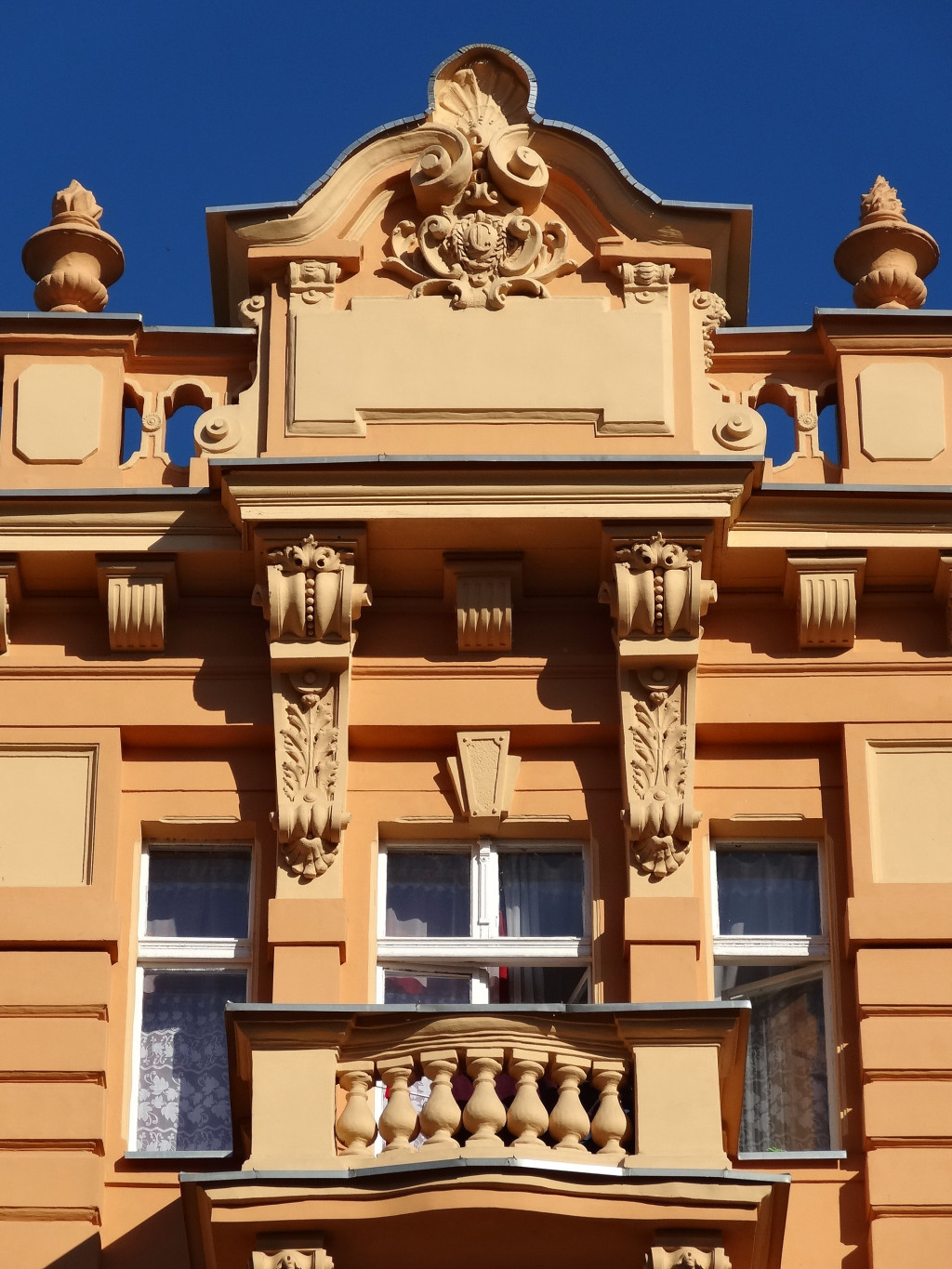
Detail of motifs

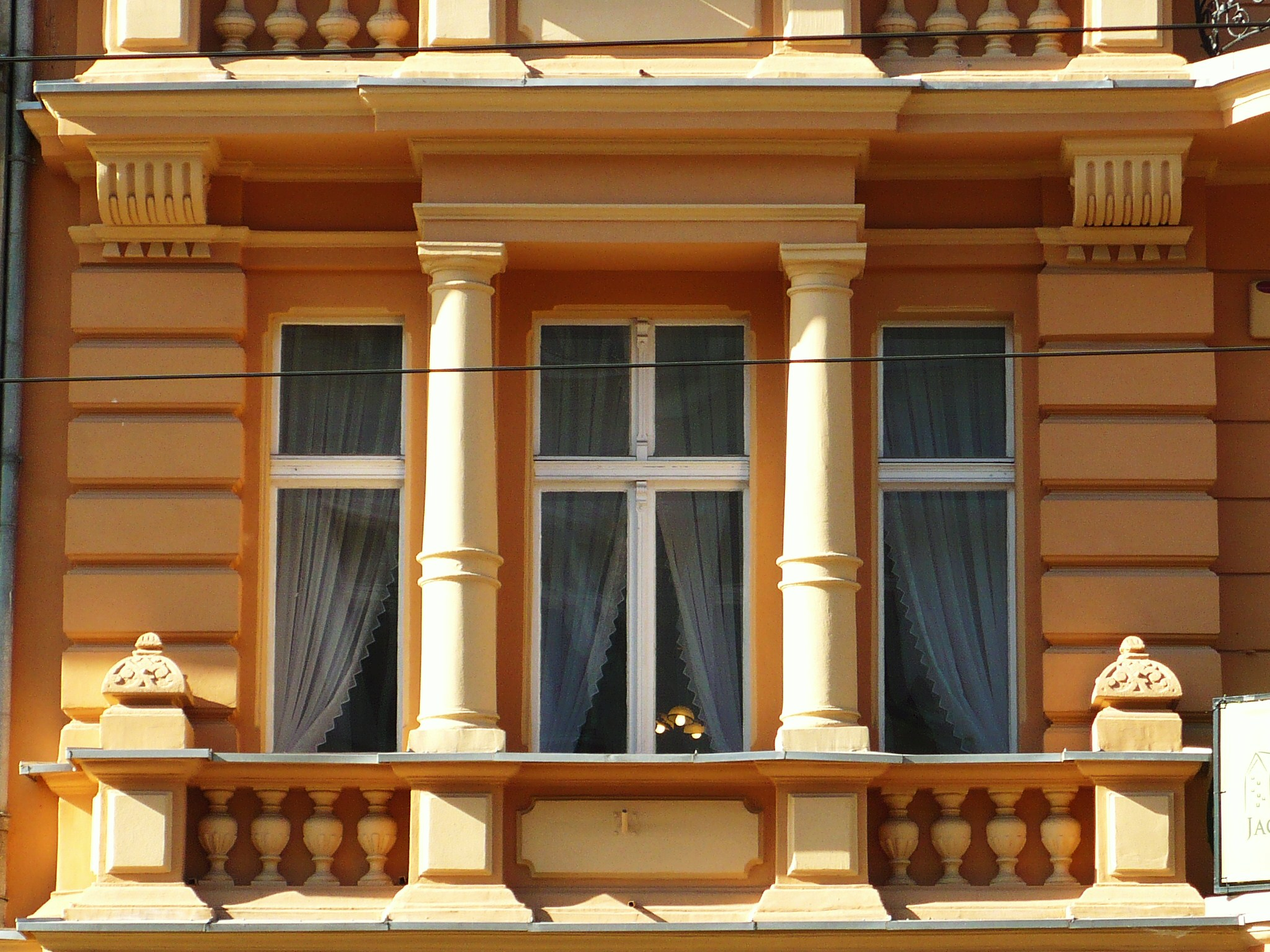
Detail of balcony

=== Tenement at 2 Krasiński Street ===
Registered on Kuyavian-Pomeranian Voivodeship heritage list, Nr.601371-Reg.A/1090, December 15, 1993

Built in 1912 by Franz Julius Knüpfer

Modern architecture.

The house originally housed commercial premises on the ground floor.

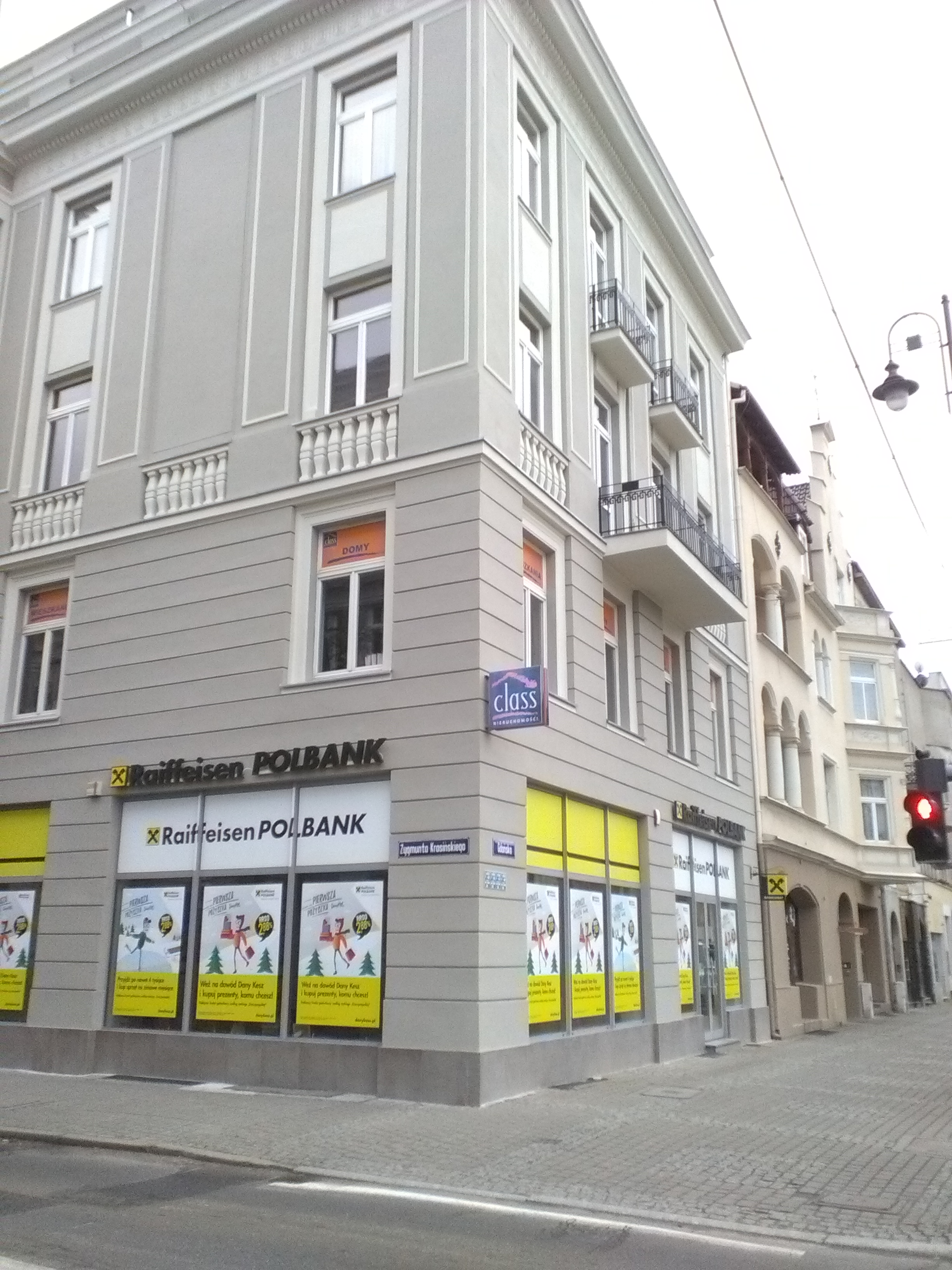
Corner view after 2017 renovation

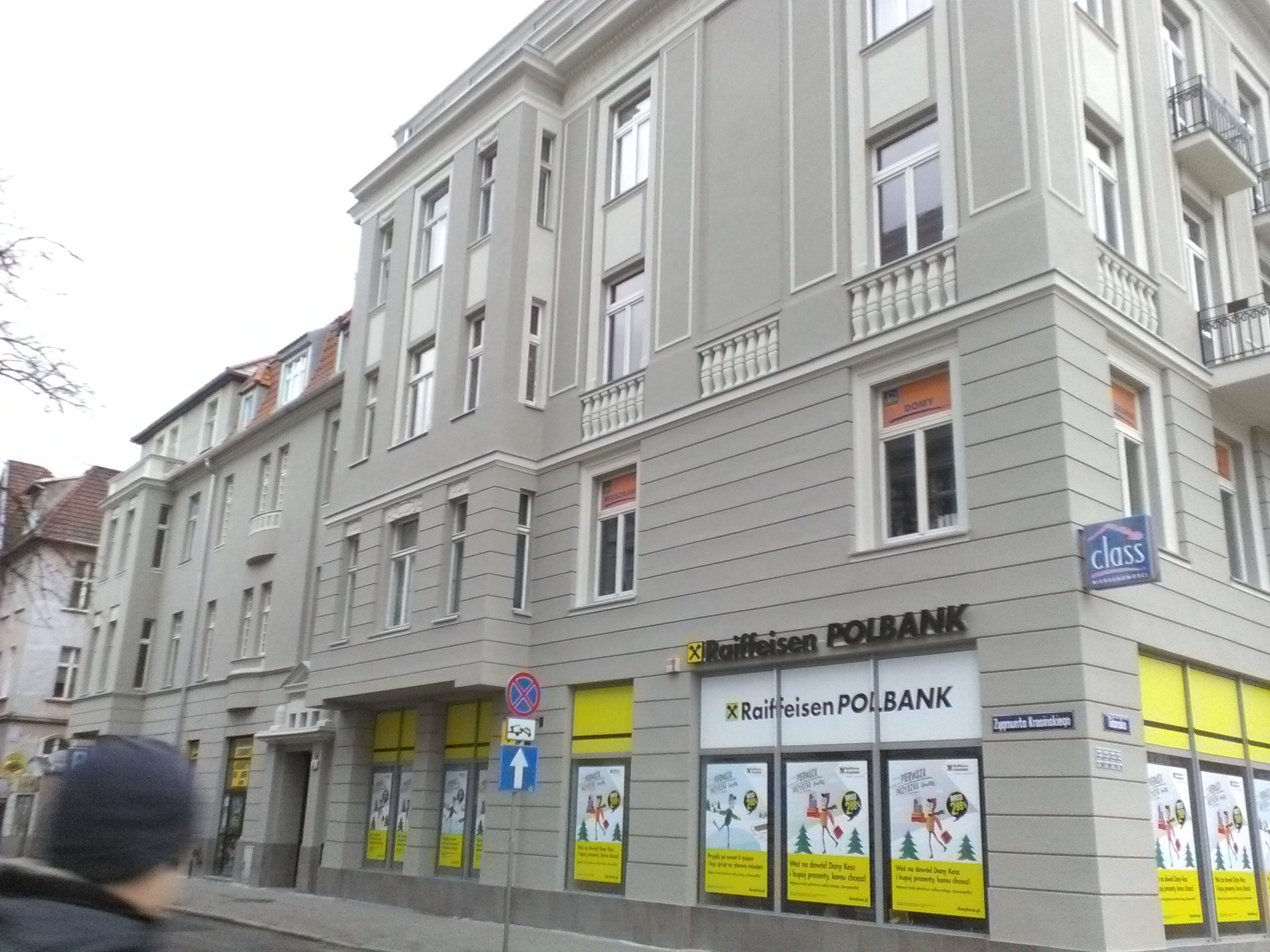
Restored elevation on Krasinskiego street

=== Fritz Weidner tenement at 34 ===
Built in 1910 by Fritz Weidner

German Historicism.

The home of the architect Fritz Weidner from 1912 on.

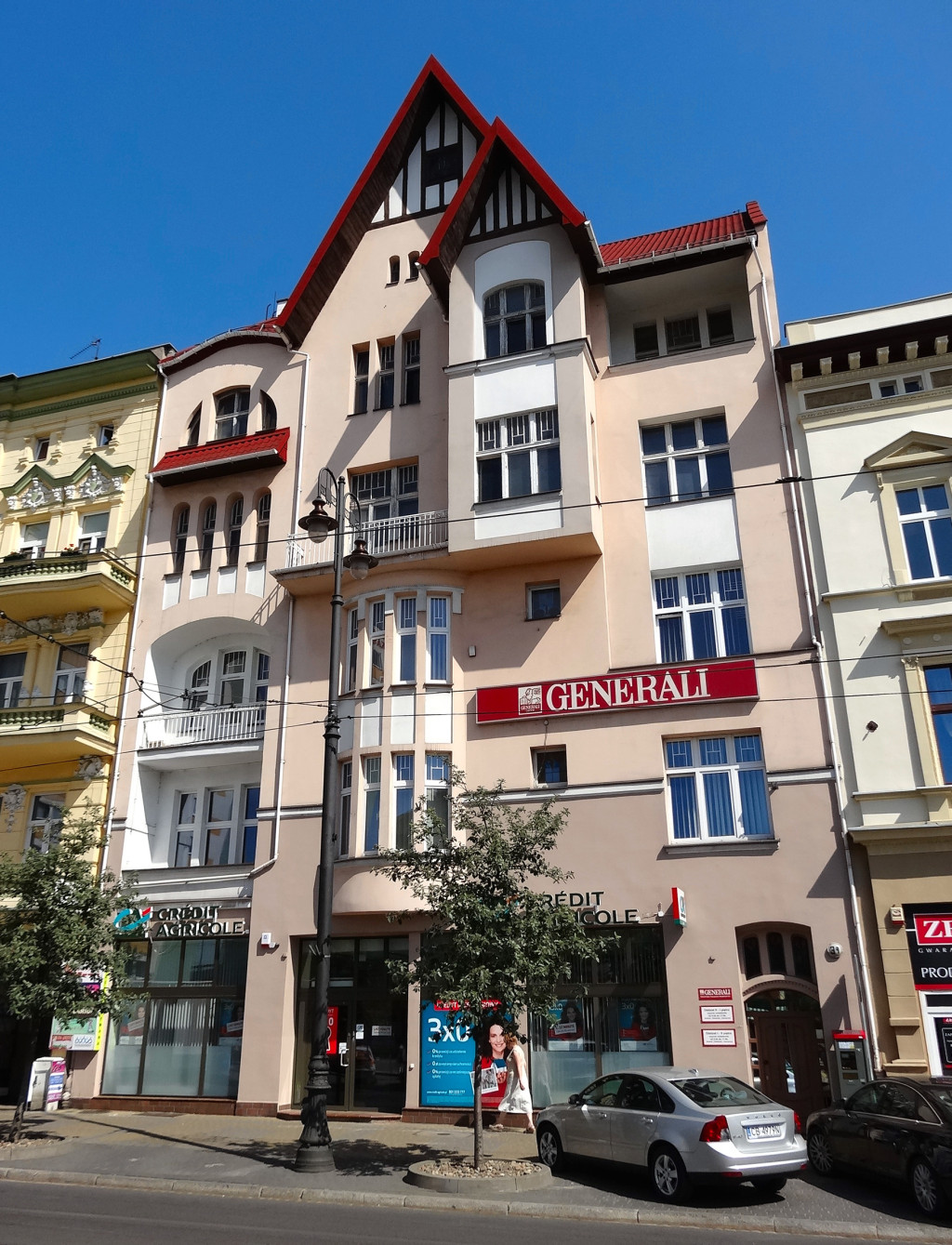
Main frontage

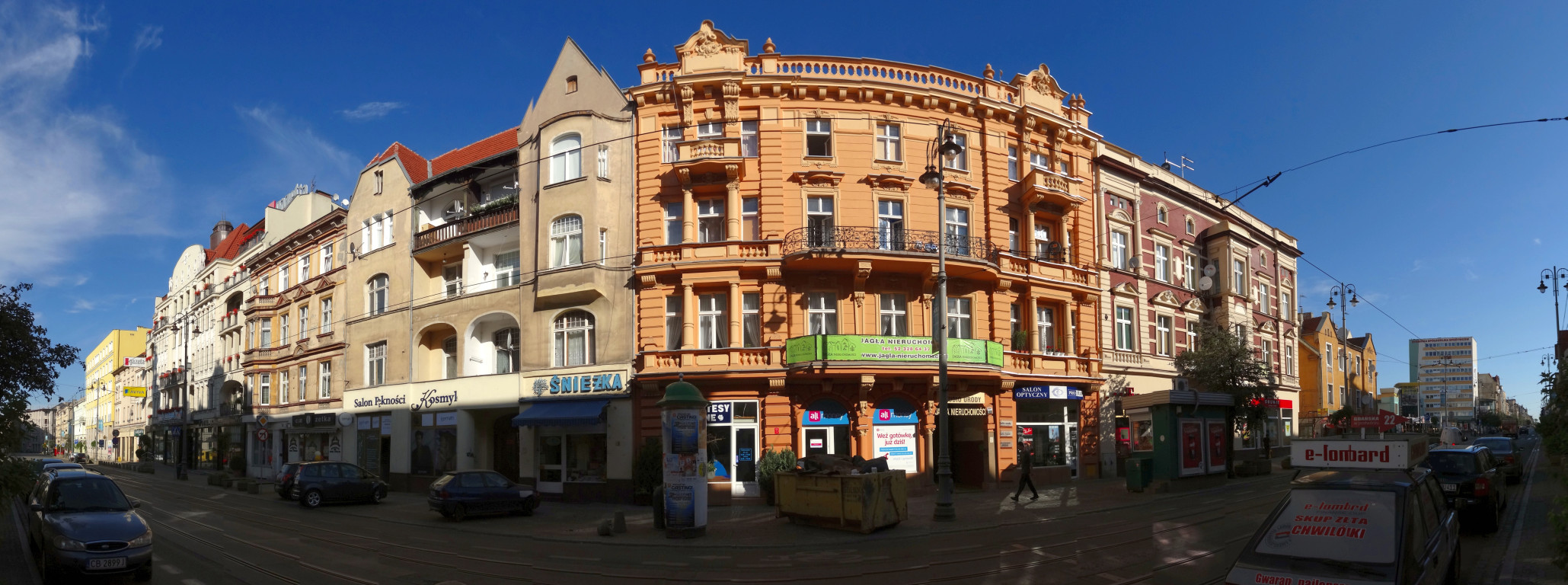
George Sikorski Tenement (left), Tenement at Gdanska street 33 (center), Julius Grey house (right)

=== Julius Grey house at 35 ===
Built in 1887 by Hermann Lewandowski and in 1909 by Rudolf Kern

Eclecticism

Until 2003, the Cristal café with a typical Art Nouveau décor has been located here.

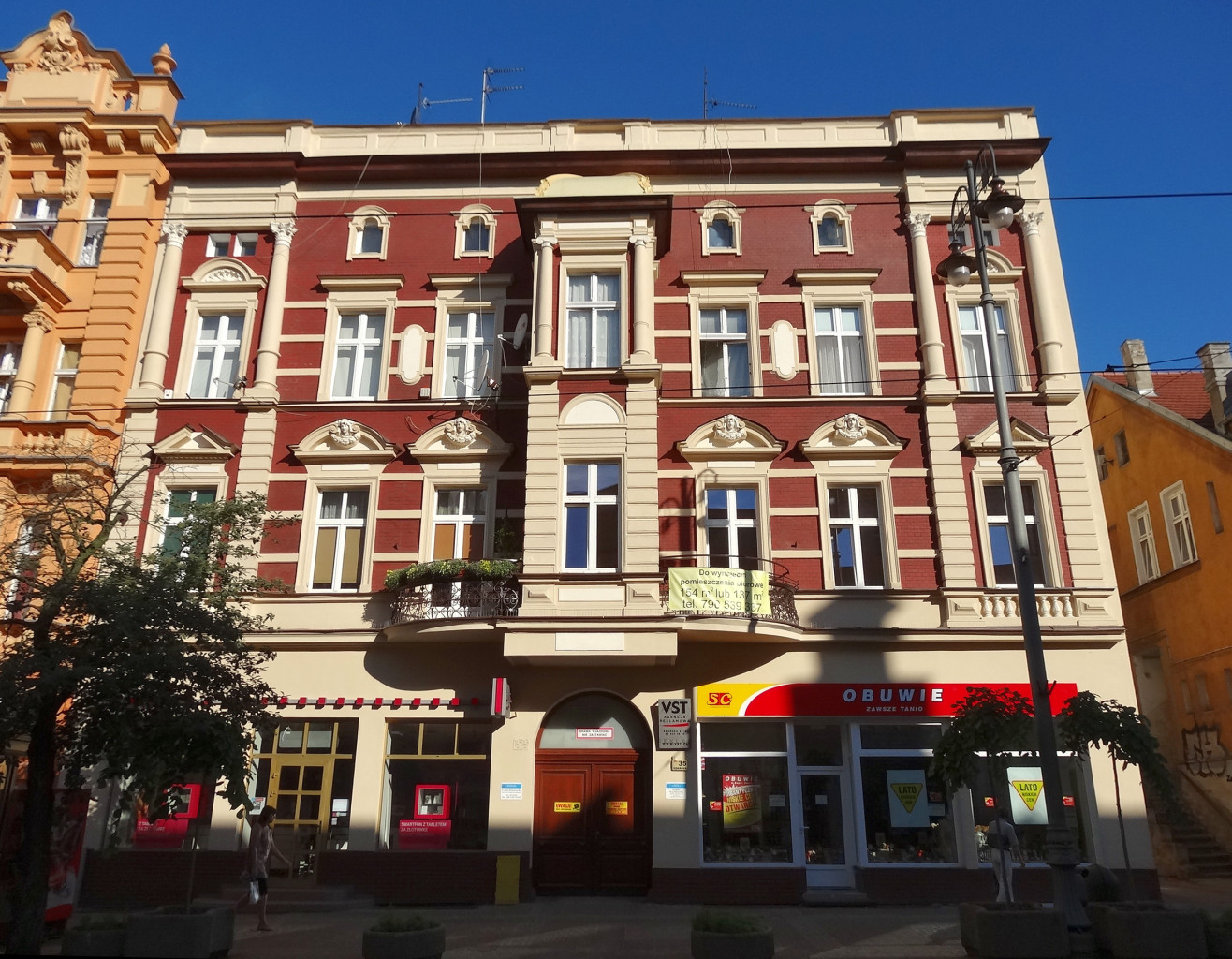
Facade from Gdańska Street

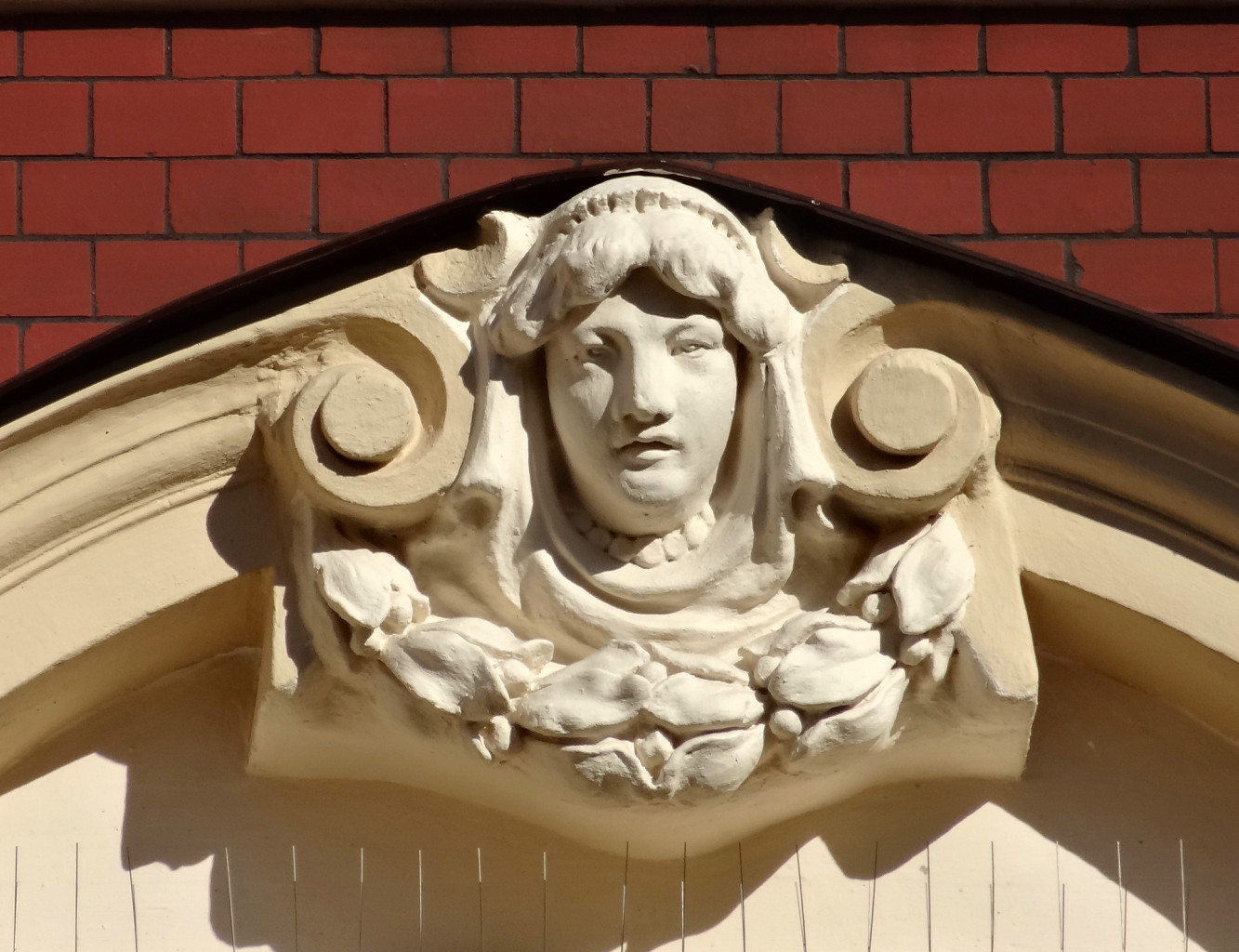
Detail of an architectural motif

=== Theonia Reichhardt House at 36 ===
Built in 1875 by Józef Święcicki, then renovated in 1898

Eclecticism & Neo-baroque

In one of the cartouche above a balcony of the second floor, a letter R (for Reichhardt family) is apparent.

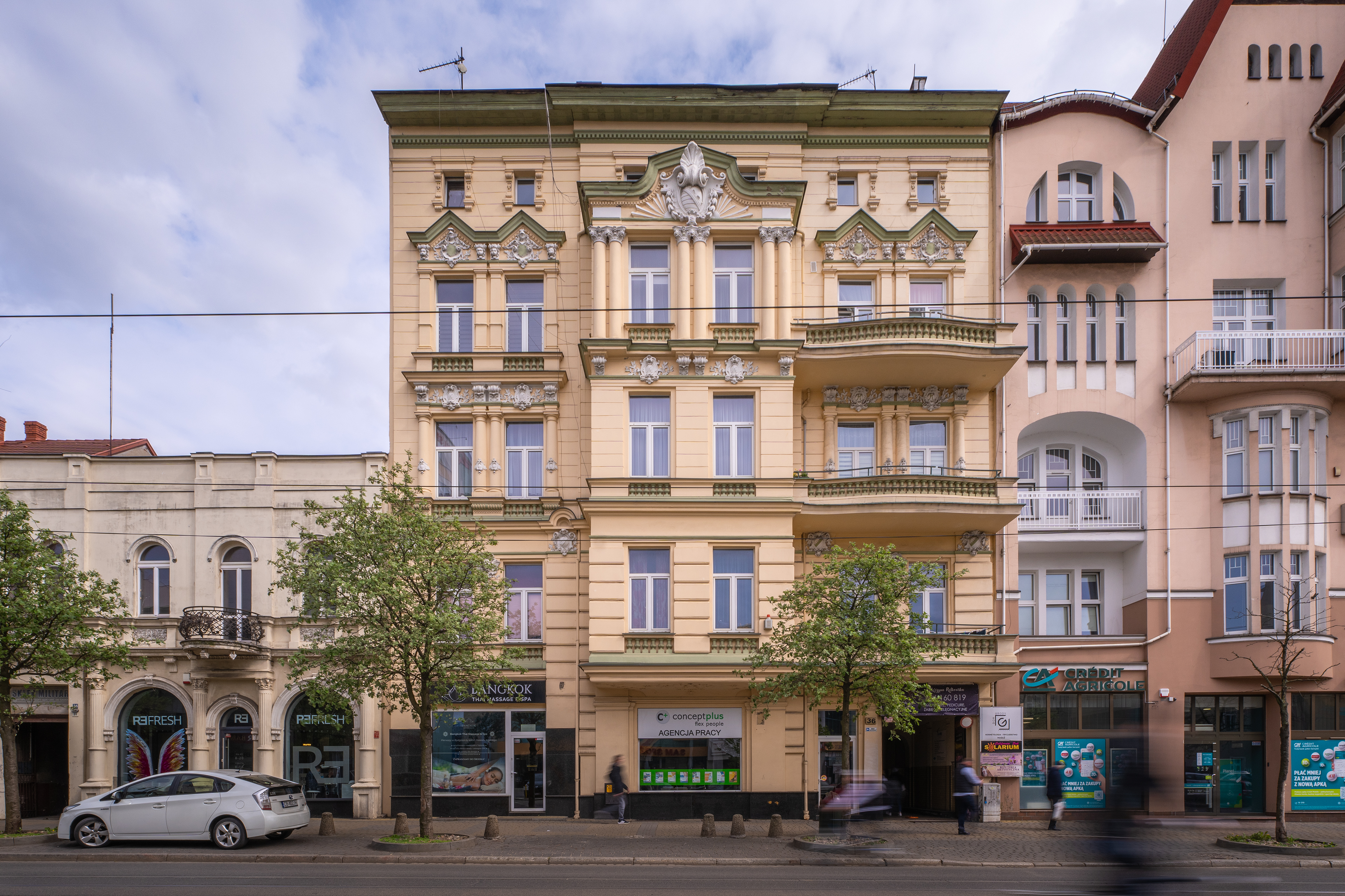
Main frontage

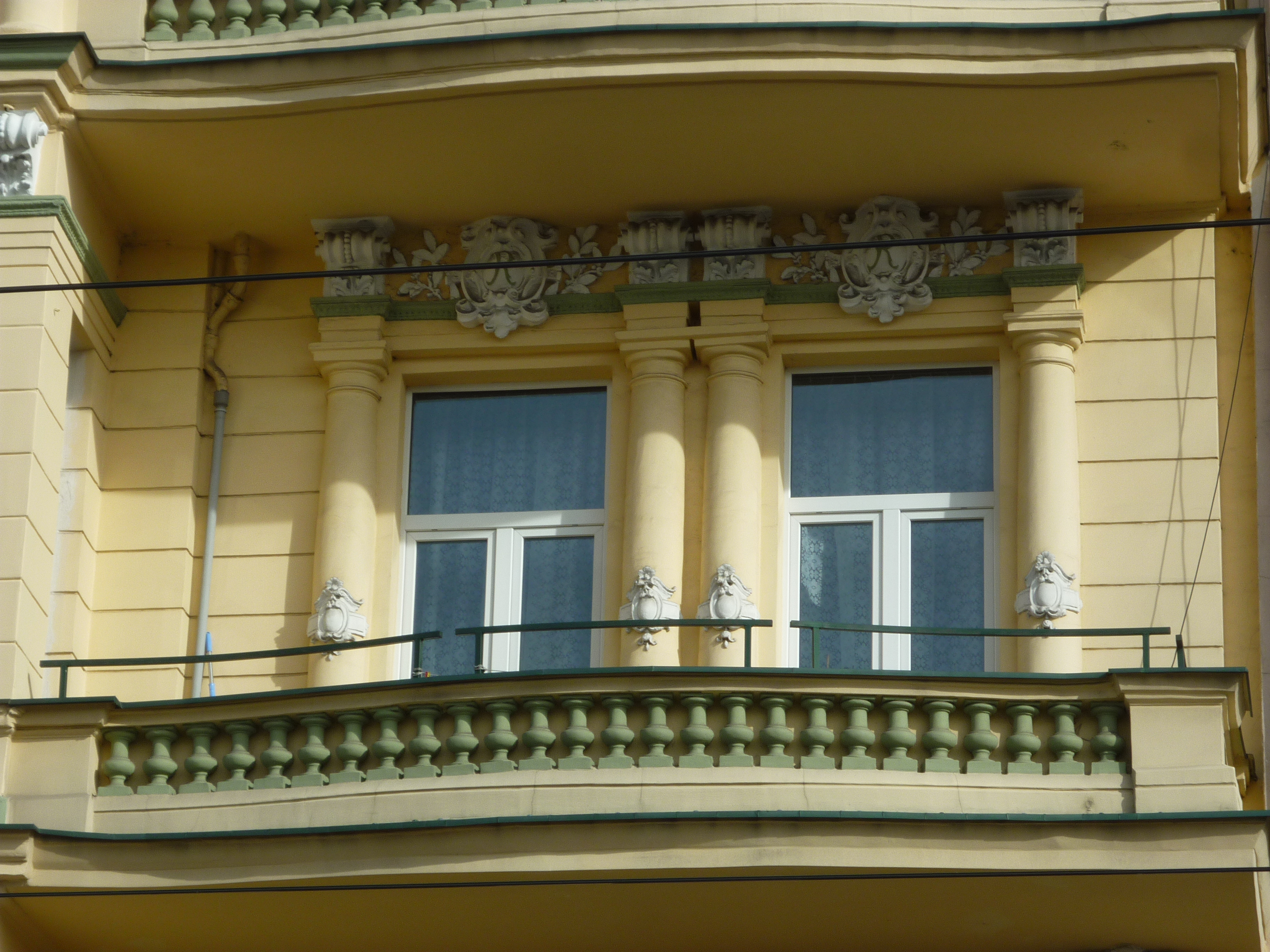
Second level balcony, with the R cartouche

=== Tenement at 37 ===
Built in 1853 by Friedrich Meyer

Eclecticism

The building originally had only one storey at midsection, hence the presence of decoration on this level: rosette adornements with trefoil motifs. Before the building in 1924 was set a petrol station run by SA Gasoline in Lviv. The house underwent a thorough renovation in 2015–2016.

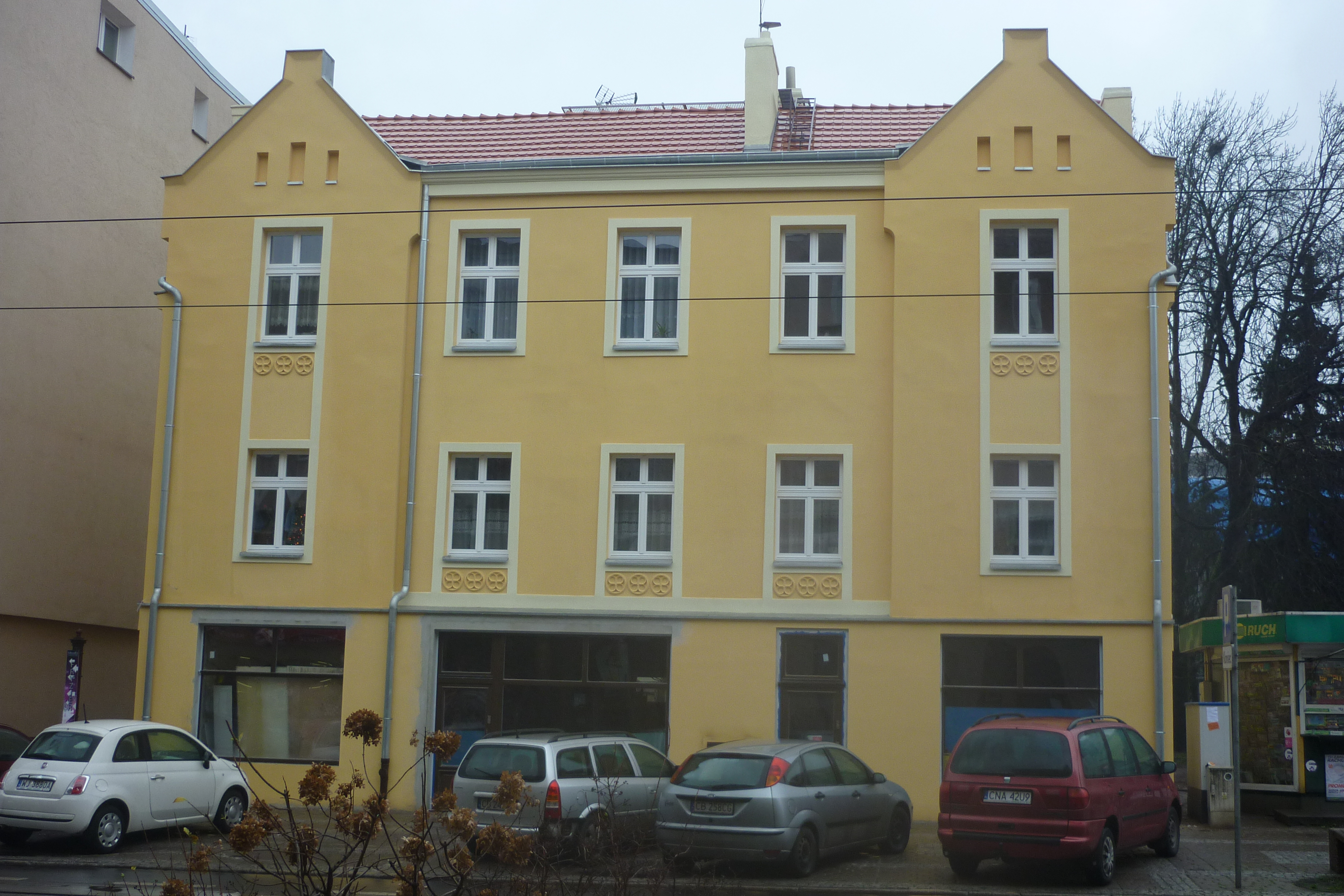
Main facade

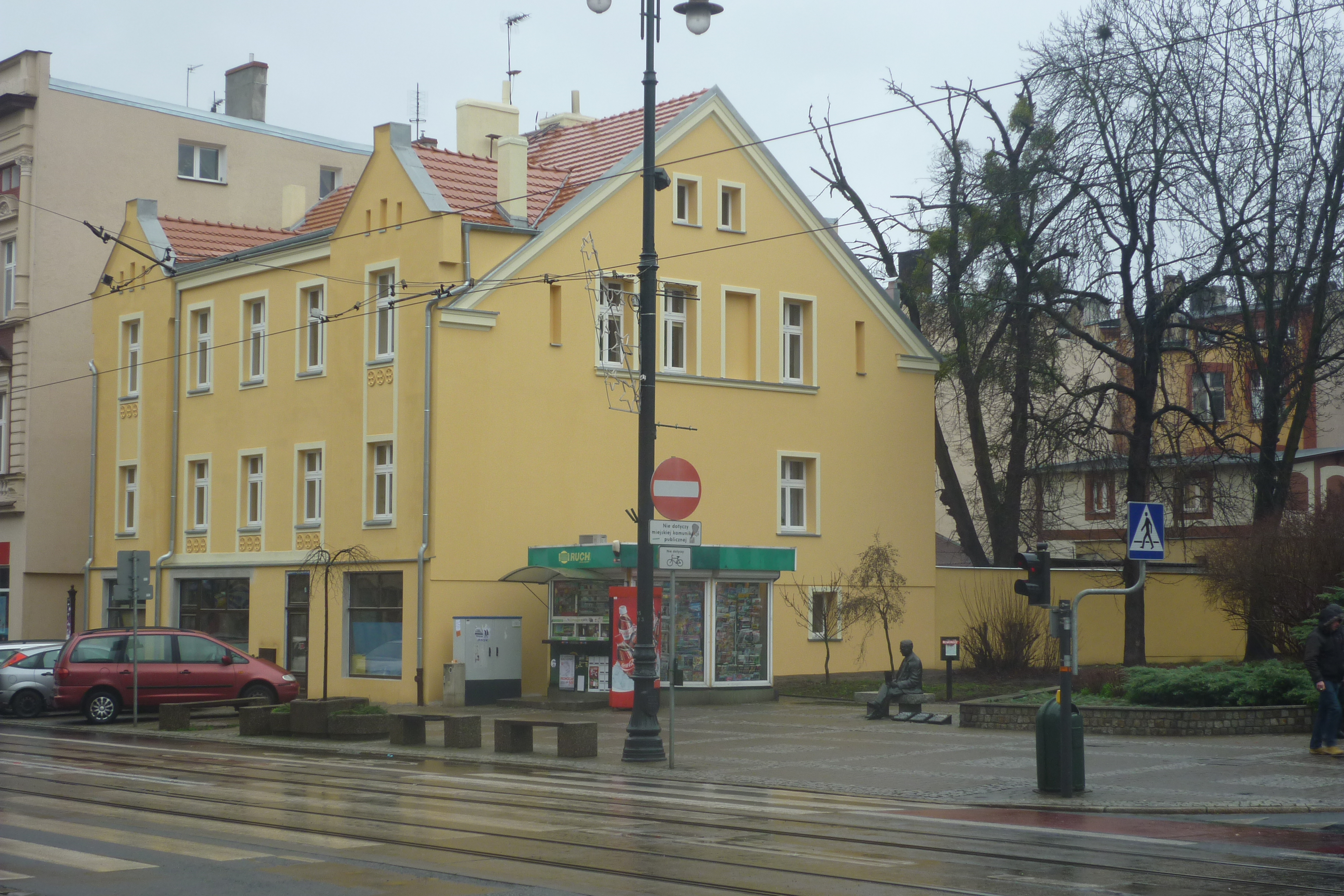
View from Krasinski street

=== Tenement at 38 ===
Built c. 1905 by Józef Święcicki

Eclecticism.

The architect Carl Rose, owner of the house around 1906, may have taken part to its design. The building shows atypical arrangement on the lower part of the facade, with high Corinthian half-columns and semicircular small balcony with a decorative wrought iron Latticework. The plot was used initially as a hothouse for the gardener of Stanisław Miaskowski, landlord at Nr.40.

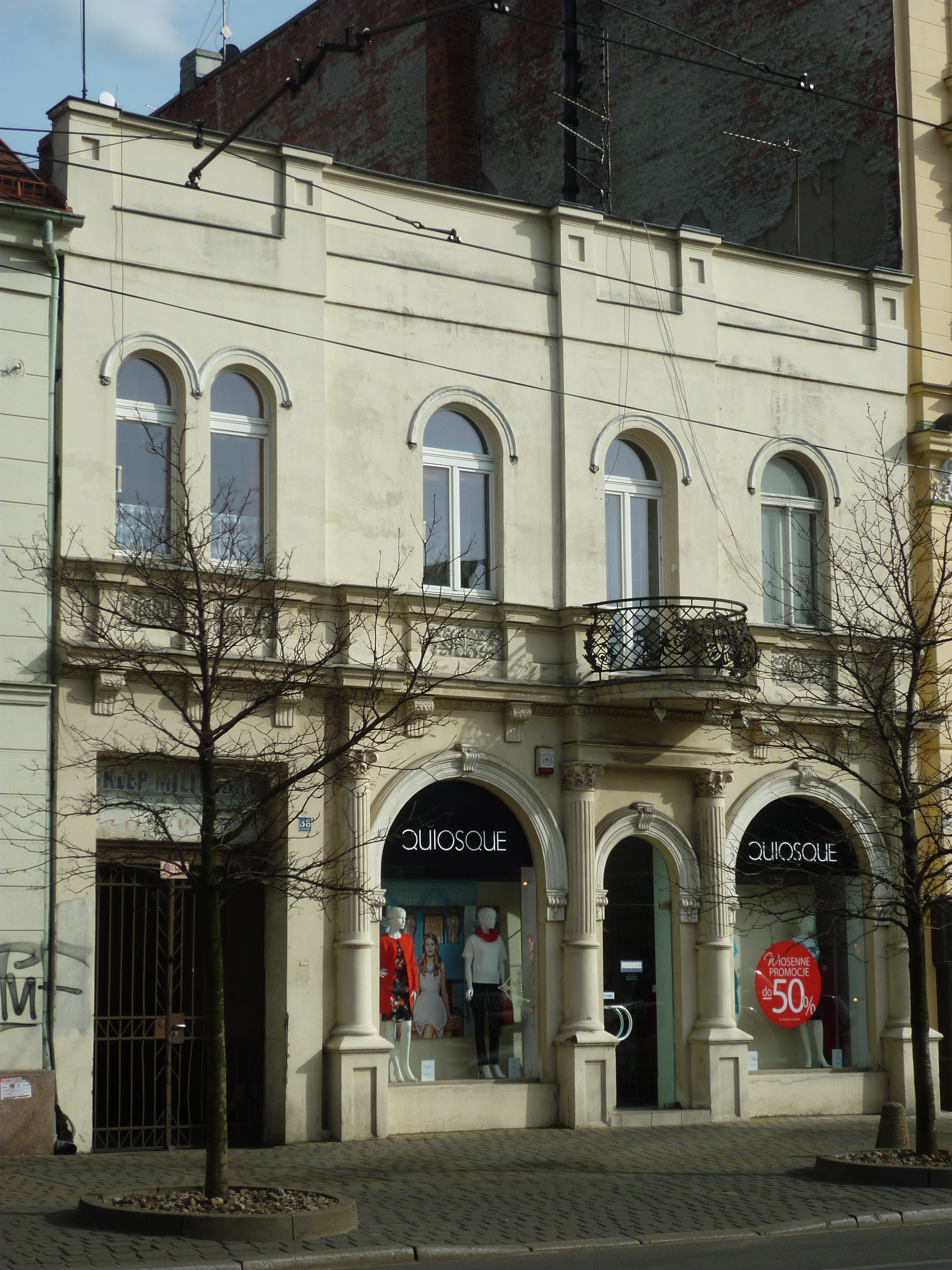
Main facade

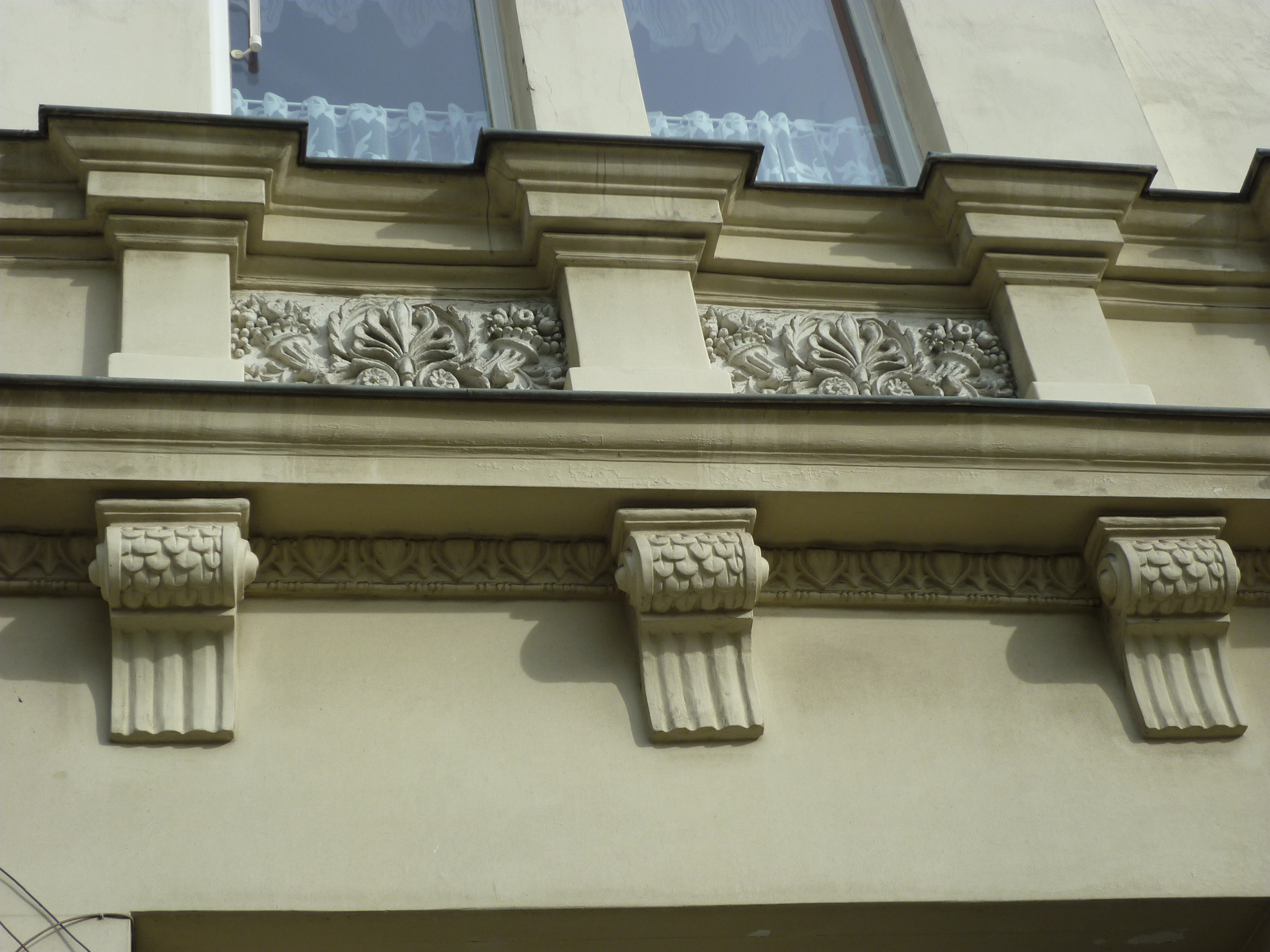
Detail of facade motifs

=== Marian Rejewski Square, crossing with Śniadecki Street ===
2005

This small green area has been named after Marian Rejewski, an eminent mathematician born in Bromberg on August 16, 1905. In 2005, Bydgoszcz municipality unveiled a memorial in this square to celebrate the centennial of Rejewski's birth. It resembles the Alan Turing Memorial in Manchester unveiled in 2001.

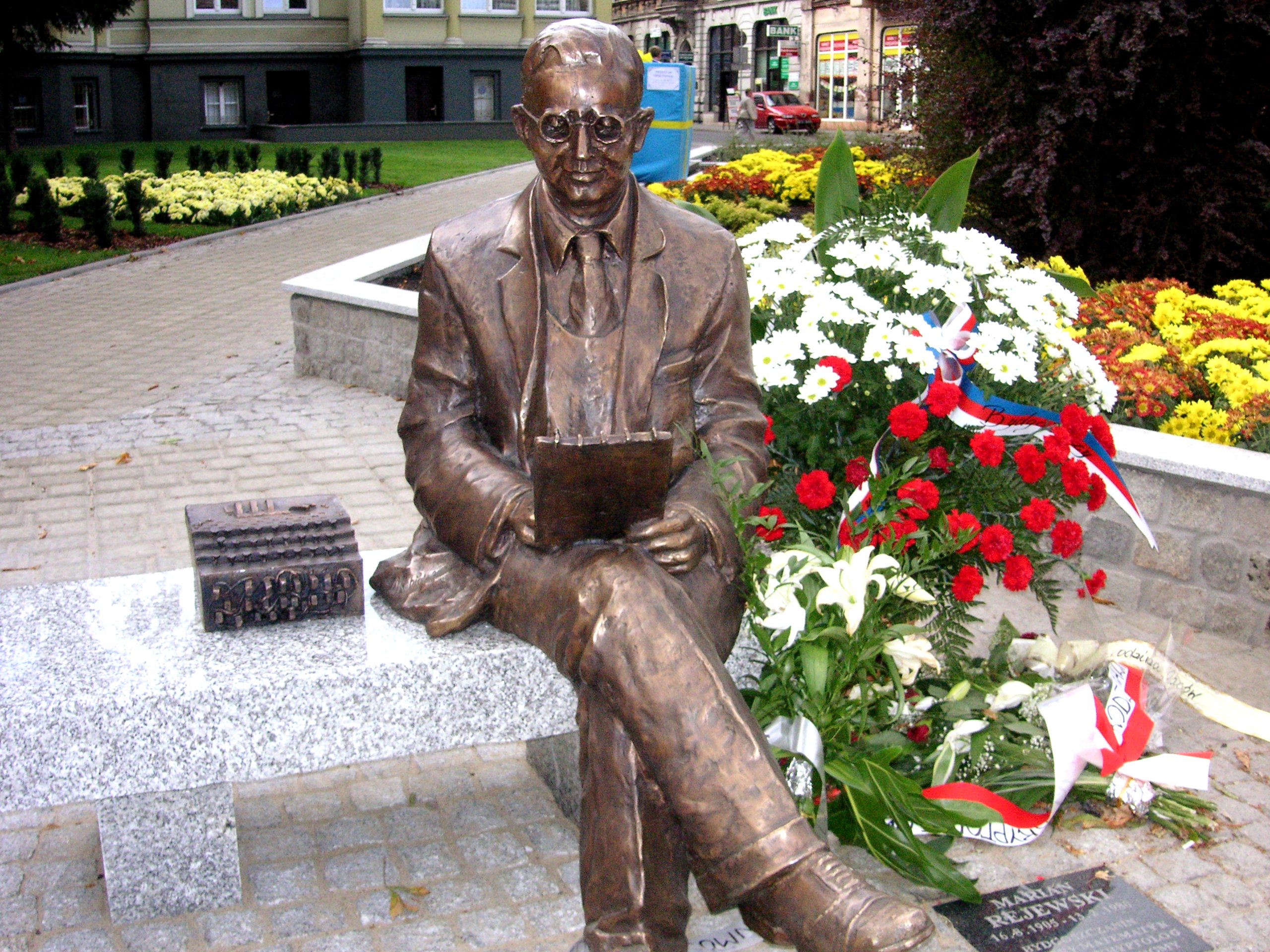
Marain Rejewski memorial

=== Stanisław Miaskowski House at 40 ===
Built in 1852 by Trieb

One of the oldest preserved in its original form on Gdańska Street

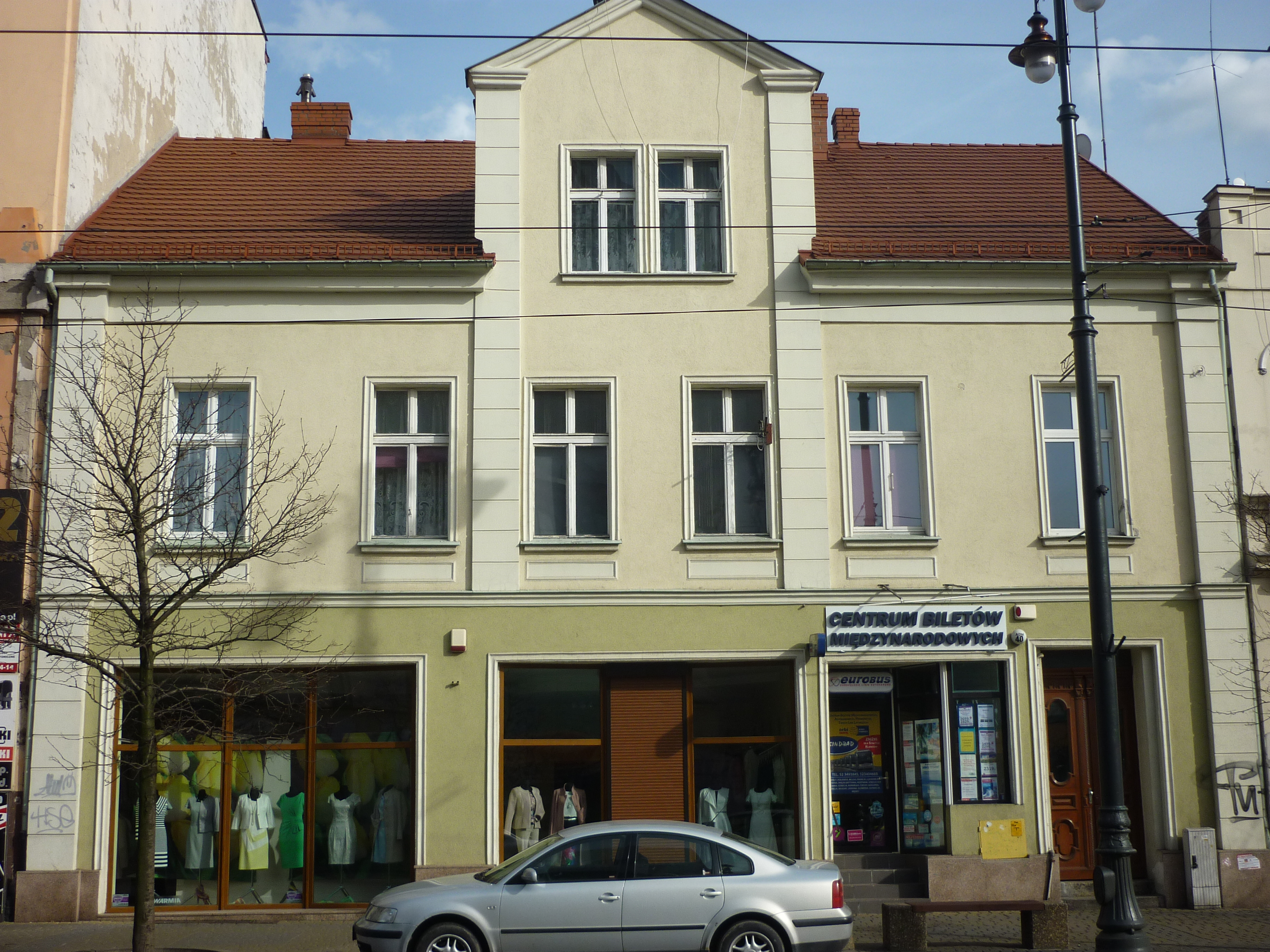
Main frontage on Gdańska Street

=== Max Rosenthal Tenement at 42 ===
Registered on Kuyavian-Pomeranian Voivodeship heritage list, Nr.601299-Reg.A/1059, August 26, 1996.

Built in 1905–1906 by Fritz Weidner

German Historicism.

The house has been erected following a commission from the shipping investor (German: Spediteur) Max Rosenthal.

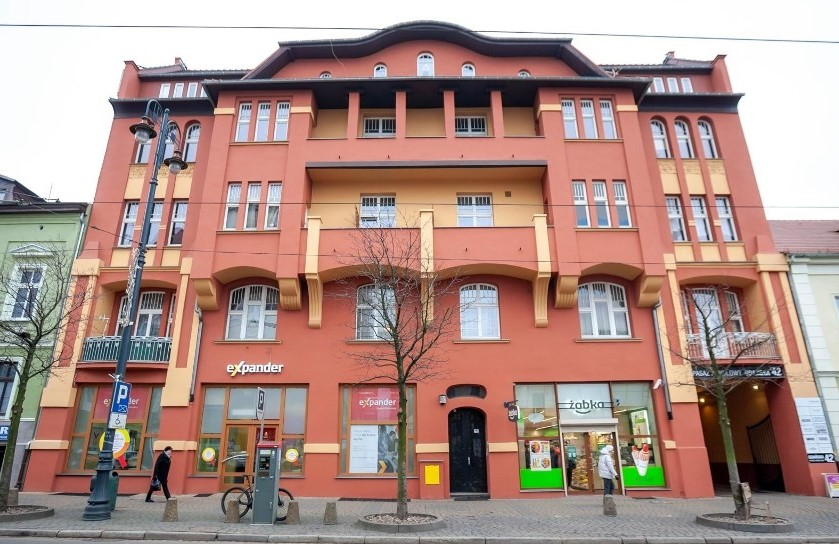
Main facade

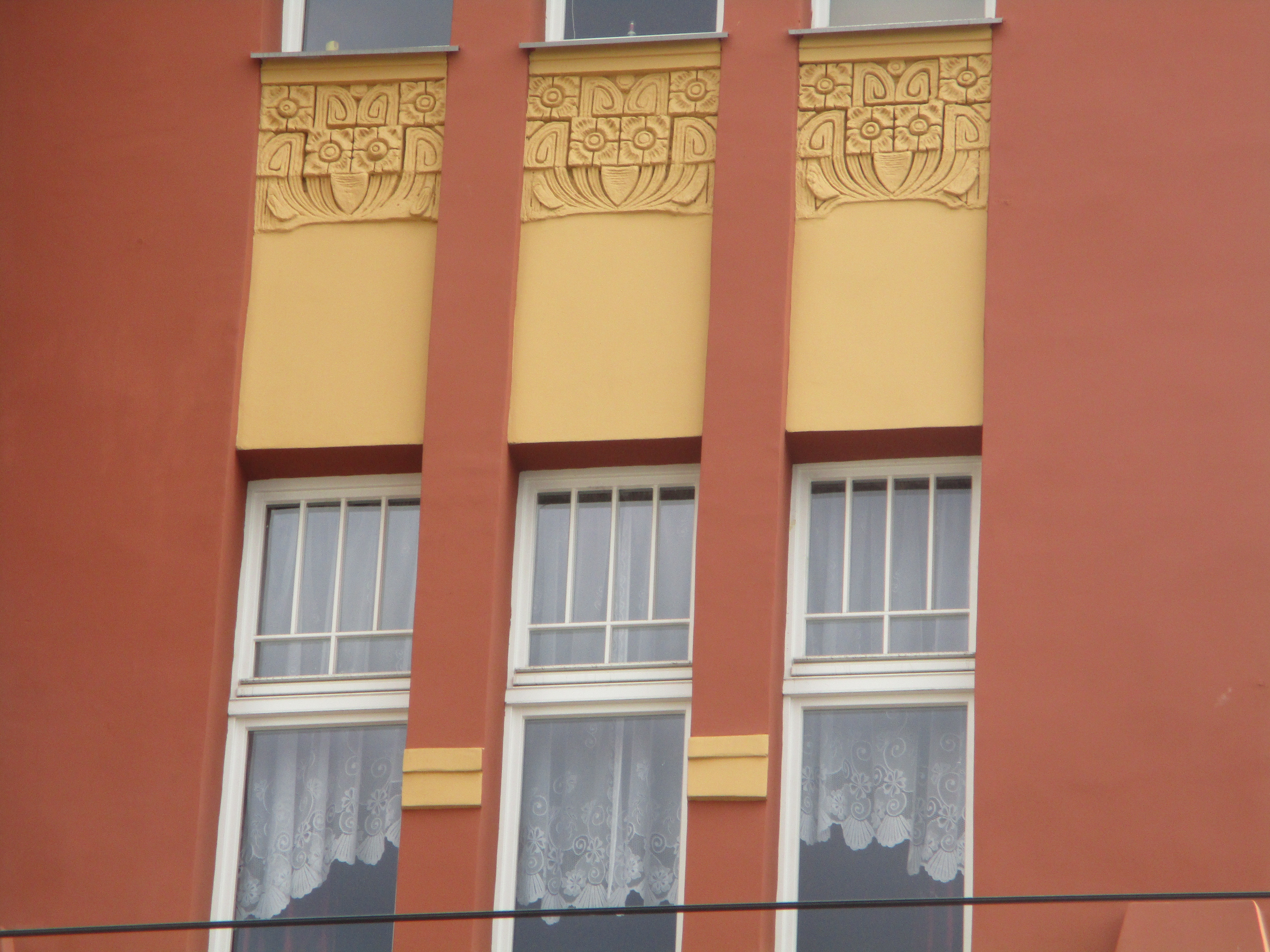
Motifs details

=== Tenement at 44 ===
Built in 1867

Its commissioner was Karl Schmidt, a rentier. House's address was then Danzigerstraße 55. Stanisław Niewczyk lived there from 1922 to 1935. The son of Franciszek, a luthier in Lviv, he managed the Bydgoszcz instrument factory from 1922 to 1935 established at 147 Gdańska street (present day Nr. 46).

Recently renovated, the facade displays eclectic features.

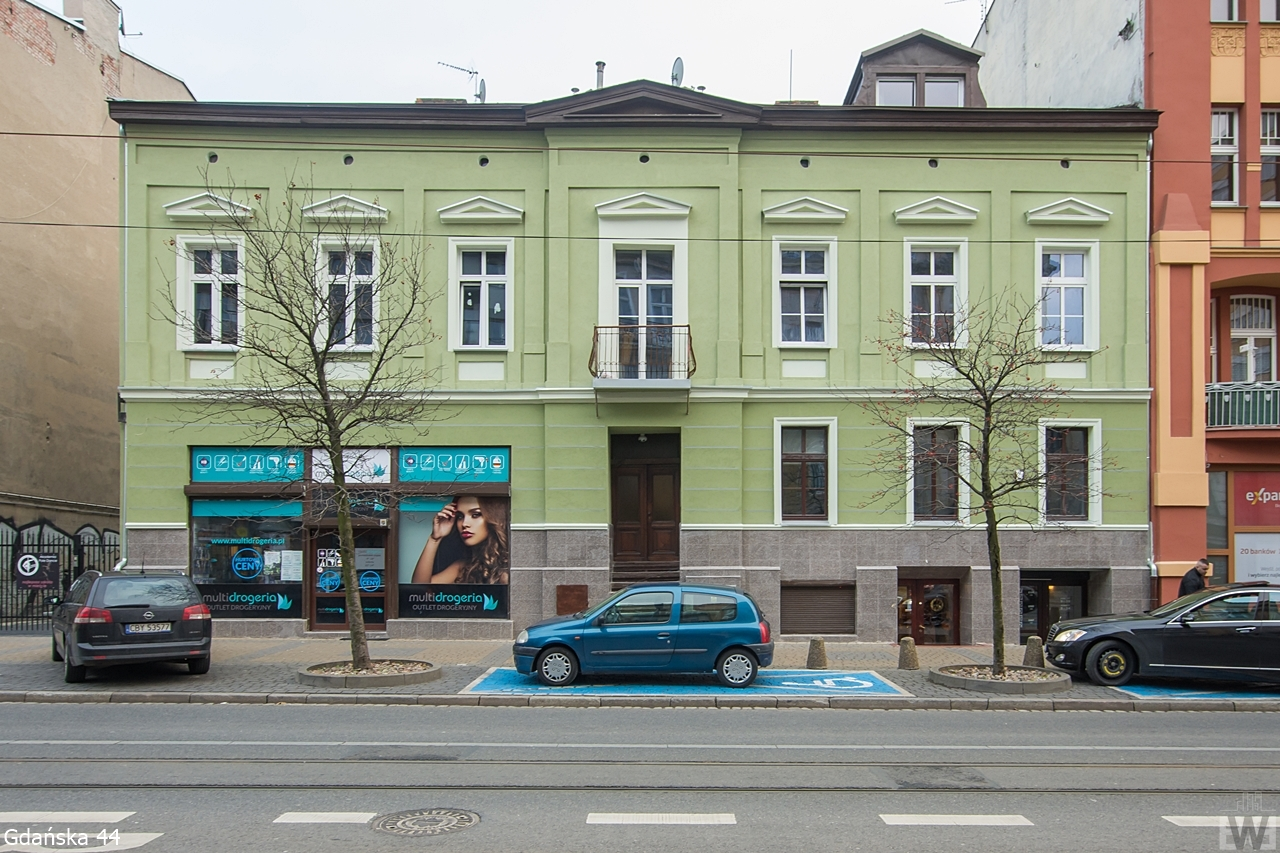
Main elevation

=== Villa Heinrich Dietz at 48 ===
Registered on Kuyavian-Pomeranian Voivodeship heritage list, Nr.601301-Reg.A/1128/1-4, July 7, 1992, and September 29, 1998.

Built in 1897–1898 by Heinrich Seeling

Eclecticism & Neo-Gothic

The villa is nicknamed Villa Flora, related to rich murals adorning of the gone loggia.

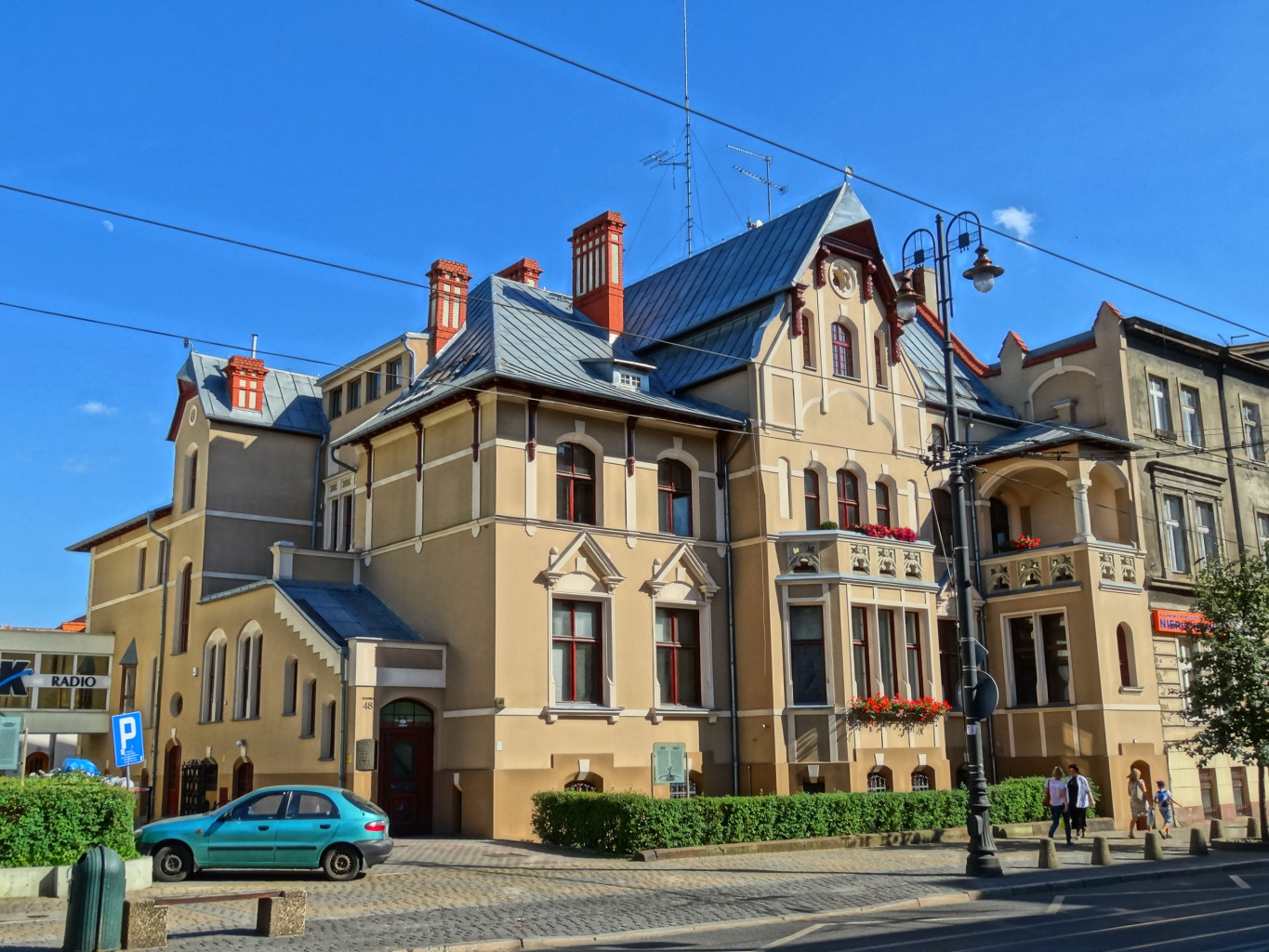
The villa from Gdańska Street

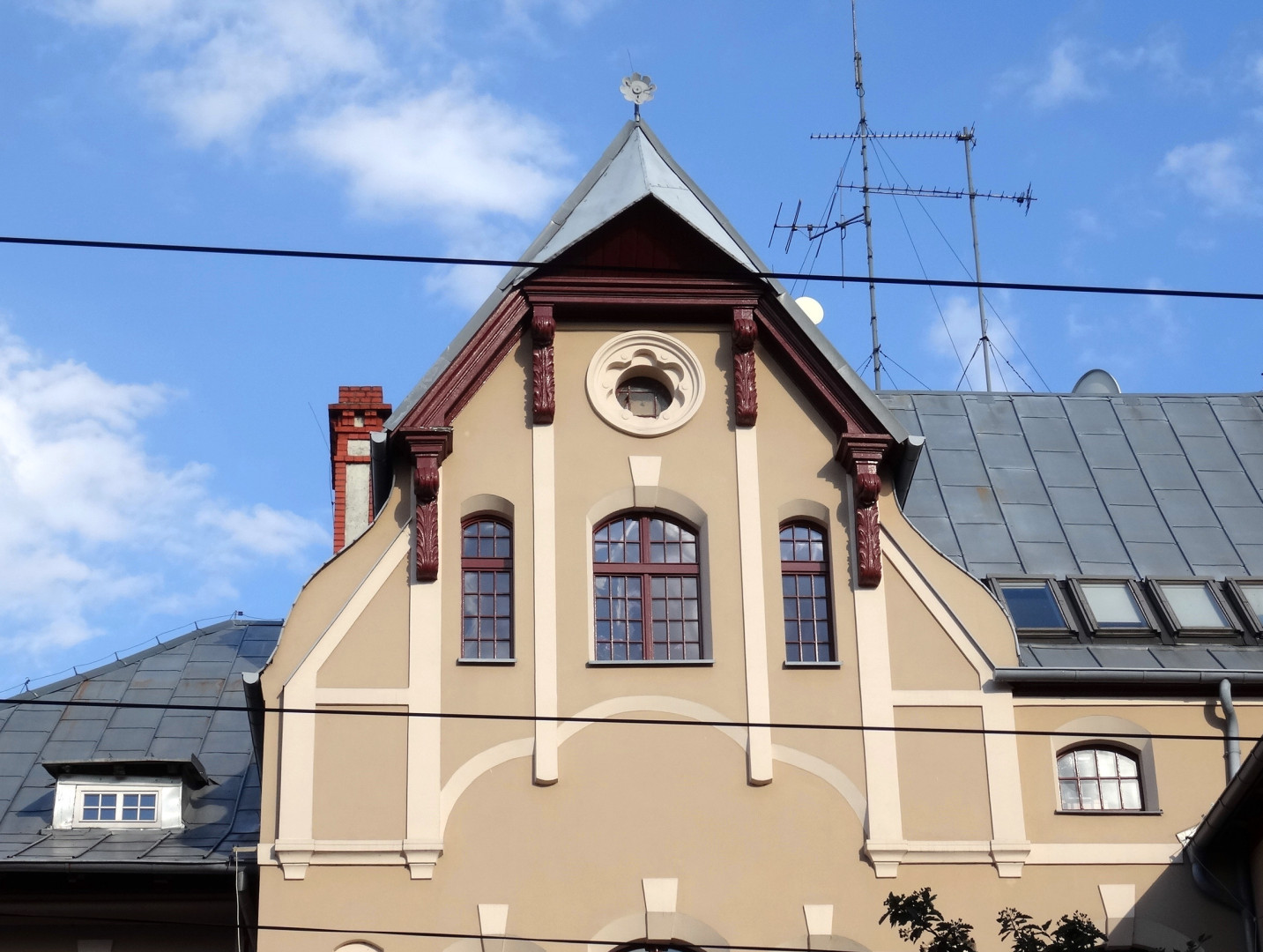
Detail of the gable

=== Tenement at 49 ===
1860s

Eclecticism

The house, at then Danzigerstraße 28, was built for a merchant, Henriette Kayka. She lived there till the end of the 19th century. In the 1920s, the house housed a restaurant, run by Edward Beidatsch.

This building, low compared to its neighbours, recalls others in downtown, built in the same time period, such as Gdańska street 37, 40 or Focha street 6. On the facade, the first level still retains some interesting features, like thin pediments and corbels. In addition, the main door shows exquisite wood carved motifs and pilasters with wrought iron elements.

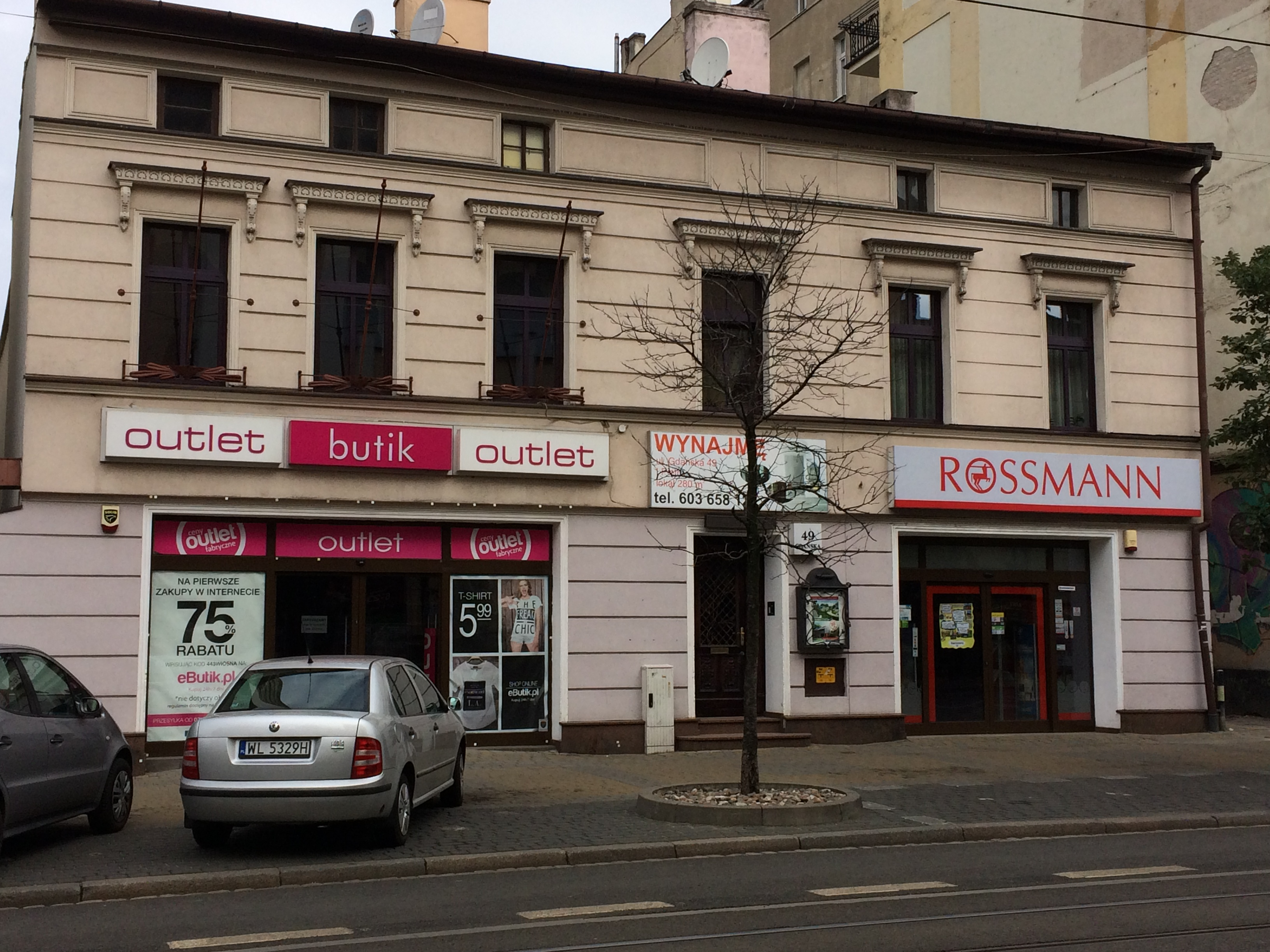
Main elevation

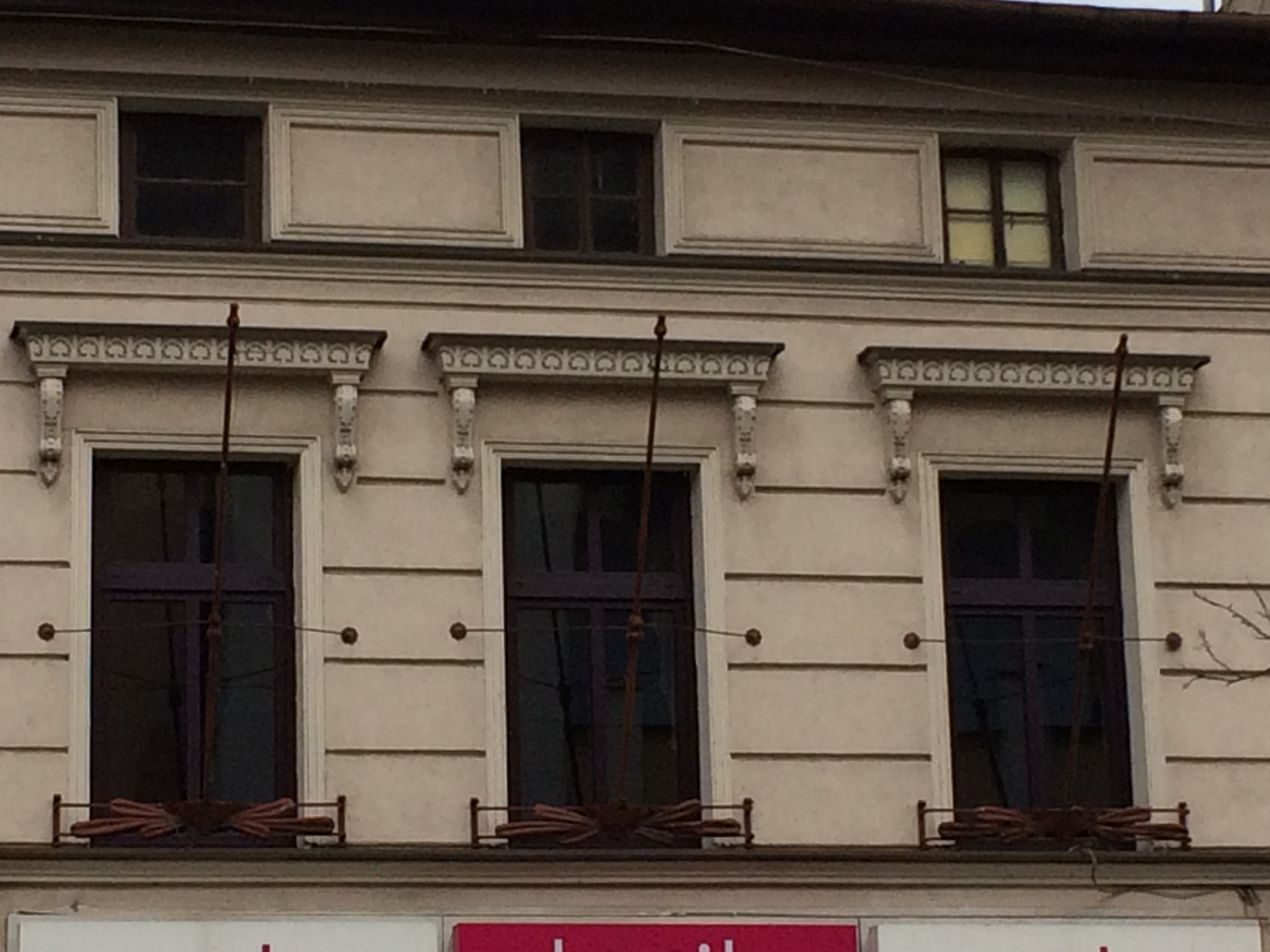
Windows decoration

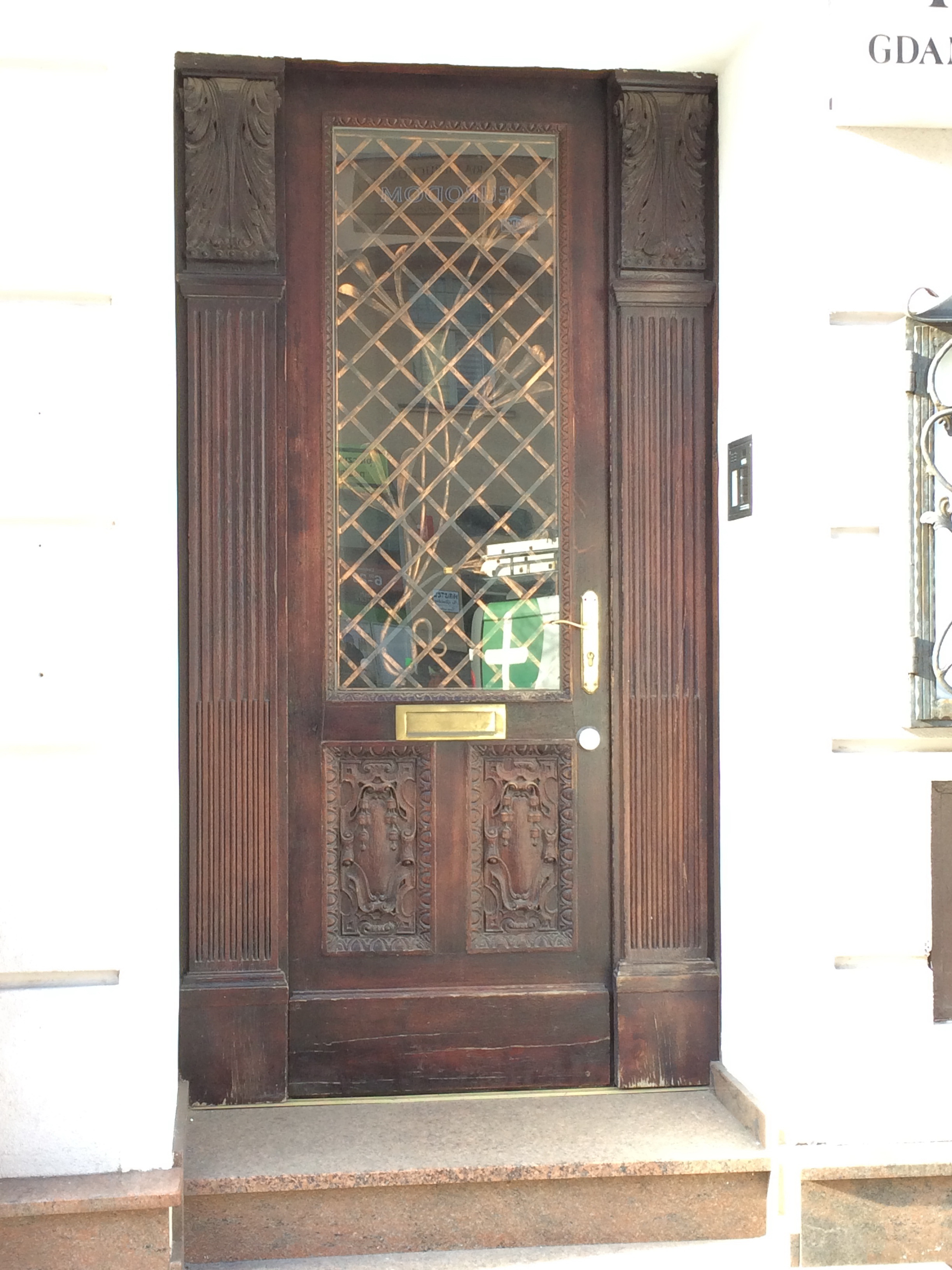
Main door

=== Villa Wilhelm Blumwe at 50 ===
Registered on Kuyavian-Pomeranian Voivodeship heritage list, Nr.601301-Reg.A/1128/1-4, July 7, 1992, and September 29, 1998.

Built in 1900–1904 by Hildebrandt

Neo-Renaissance.

On top of the building facade stood from 1901 till 1940, an urn with Carl Blumwe's ashes, the father of the owner.

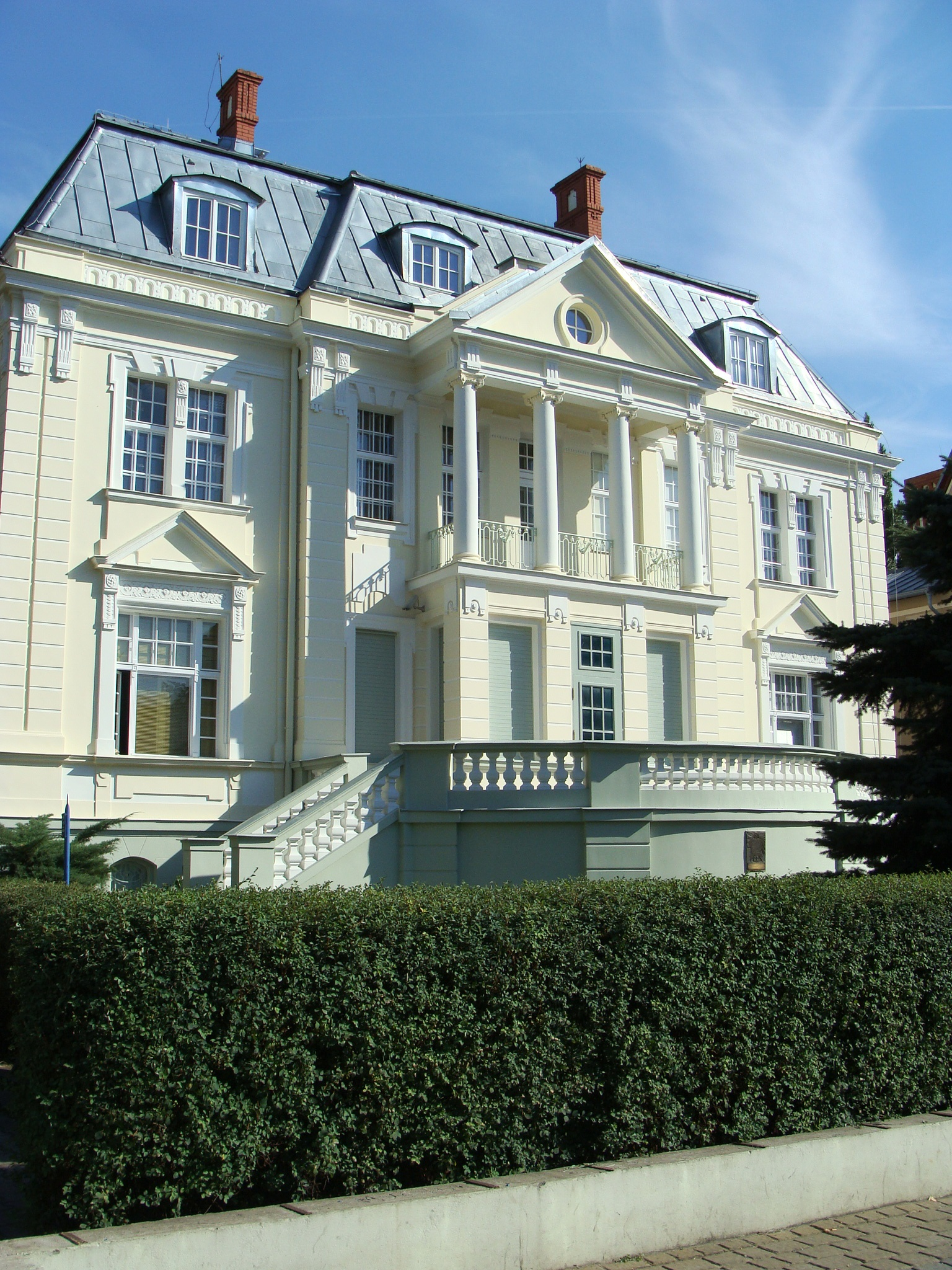
The villa from Gdańska Street

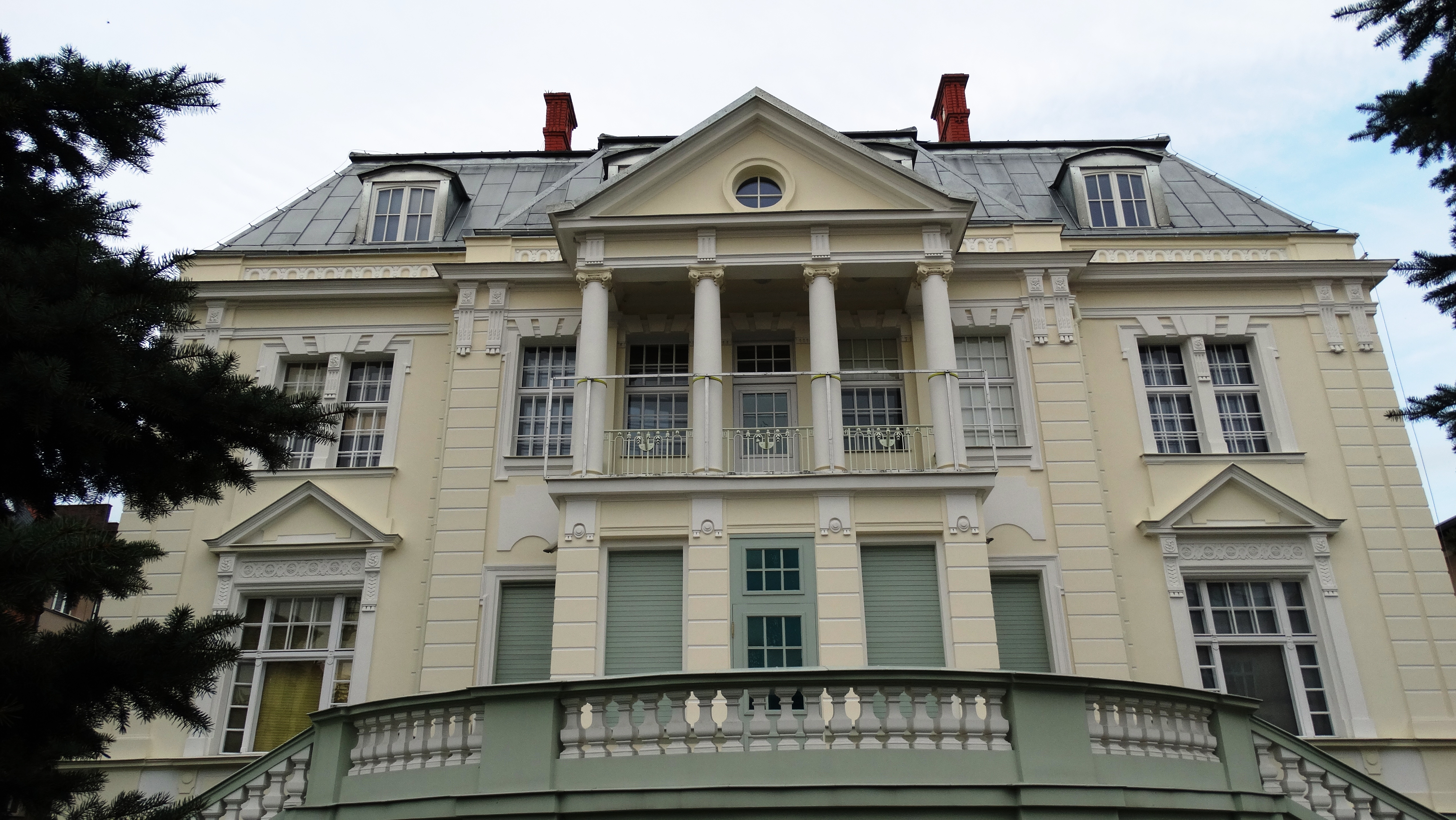
Zoom on the facade

=== Carl Rose Tenement at 51 ===
Built in 1903–1904 by Carl Rose

Eclecticism & Art Nouveau.

The architect Carl Rose lived and worked there until 1920.

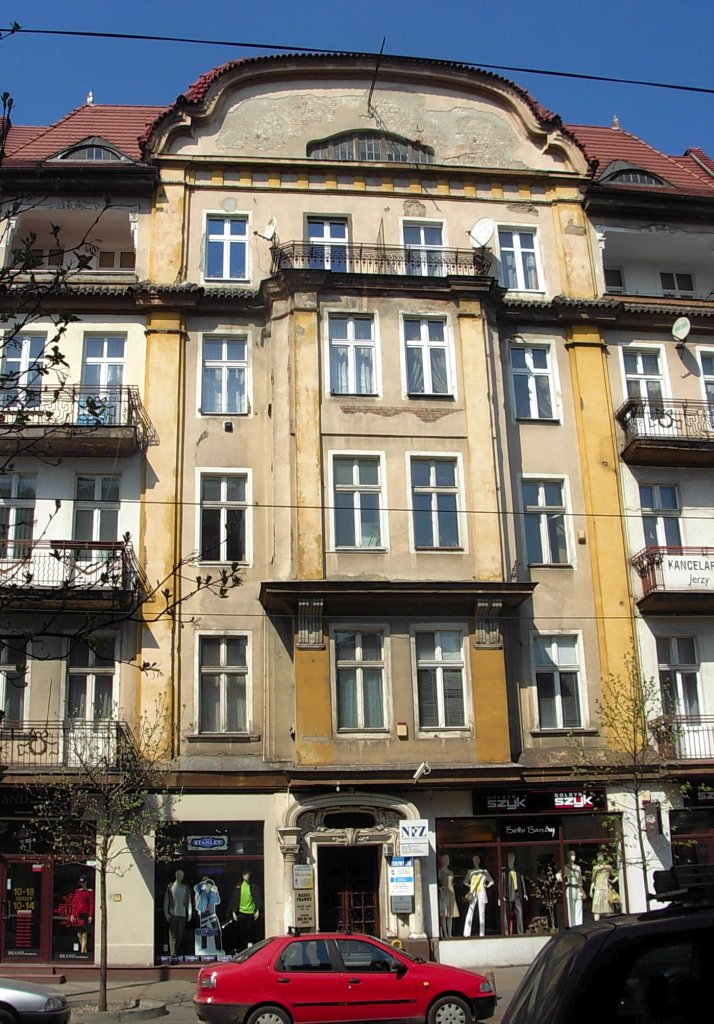
Main frontage onto Gdańska street

=== Robert Grundtmann Tenement at 1 Słowacki Street ===
Built in 1905–1906, by Alfred Schleusener

Early Modern architecture.

The building housed one of Bydgoszcz's most famous cafe: Cafe Metropol.

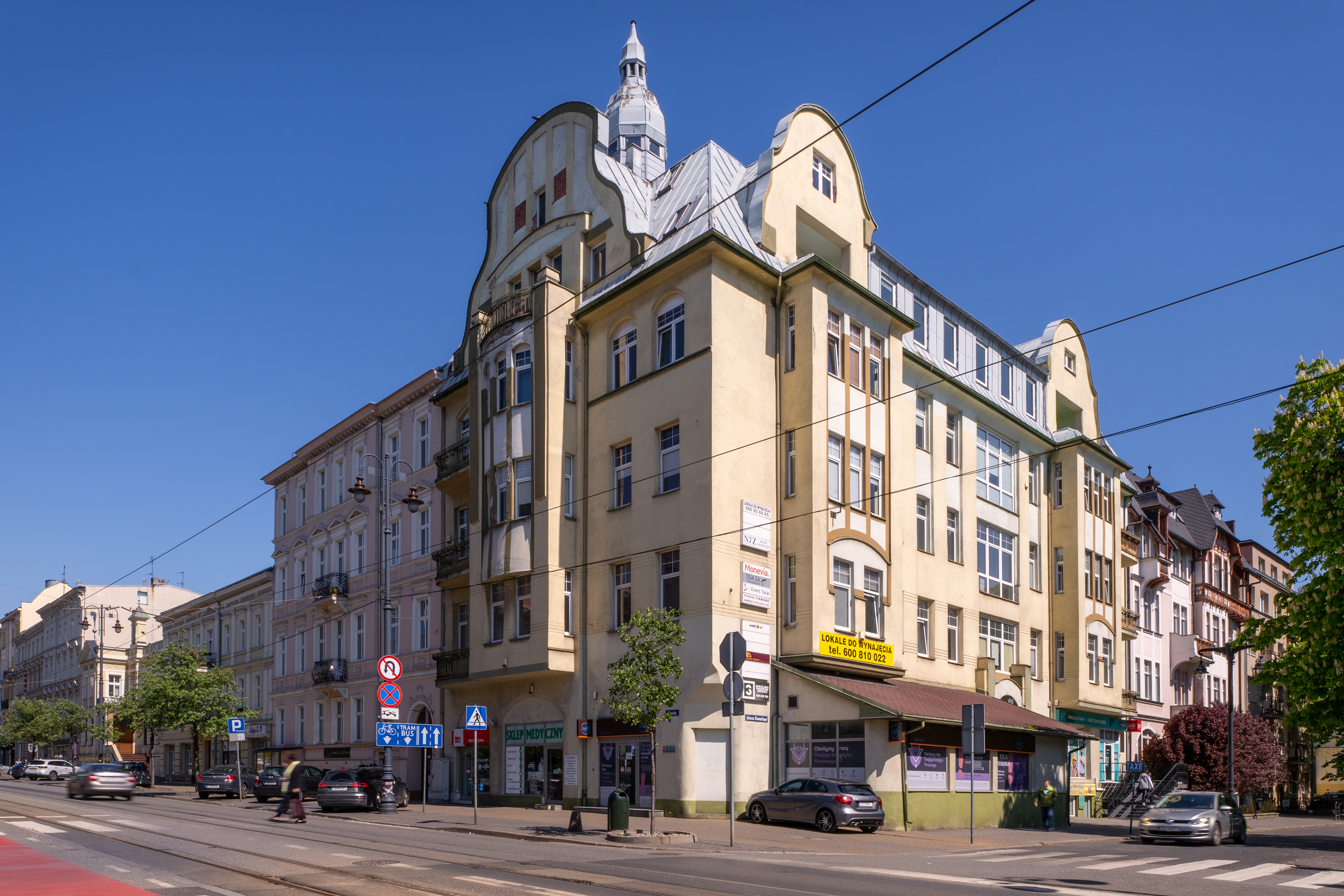
Facade onto Gdańska Street

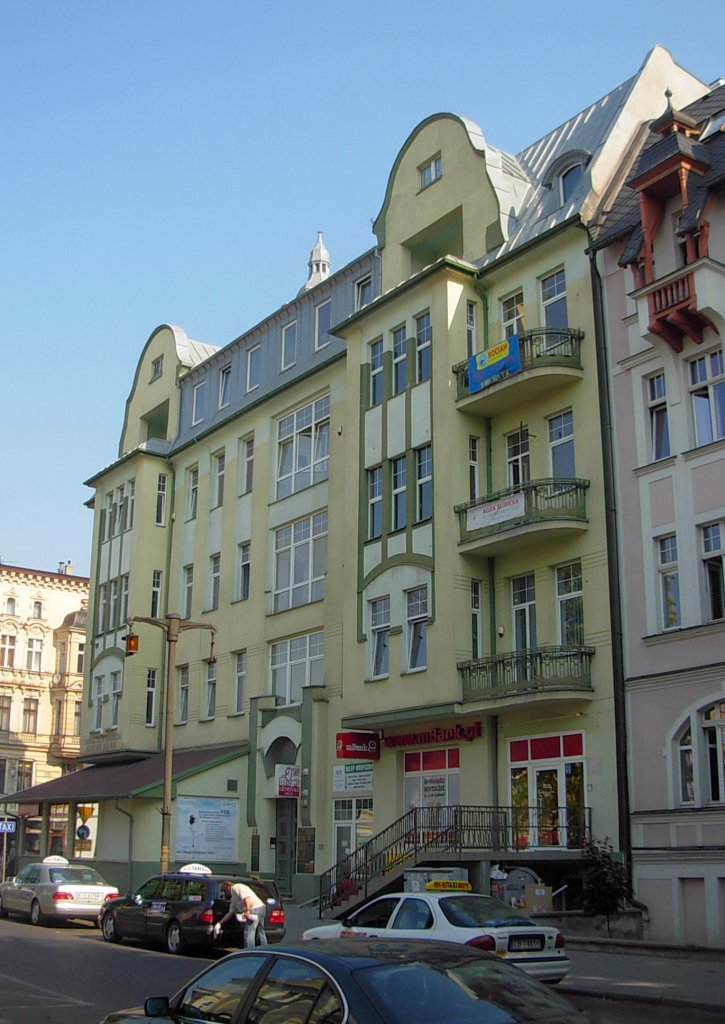
Facade onto Słowacki Street

=== Tenement at 52 ===
1878

Neo-Classicism and Eclecticism.

The house was built for a gardener, Carl Berndt, also owner of Nr.54.

The elevation features some delicate, architectural details: figures in the cartouche at the bottom of first and second floor windows, triangular pediments and a slight avant-corps to underline the symmetry of the facade. The frontage underwent a thorough overhaul during summer 2016.

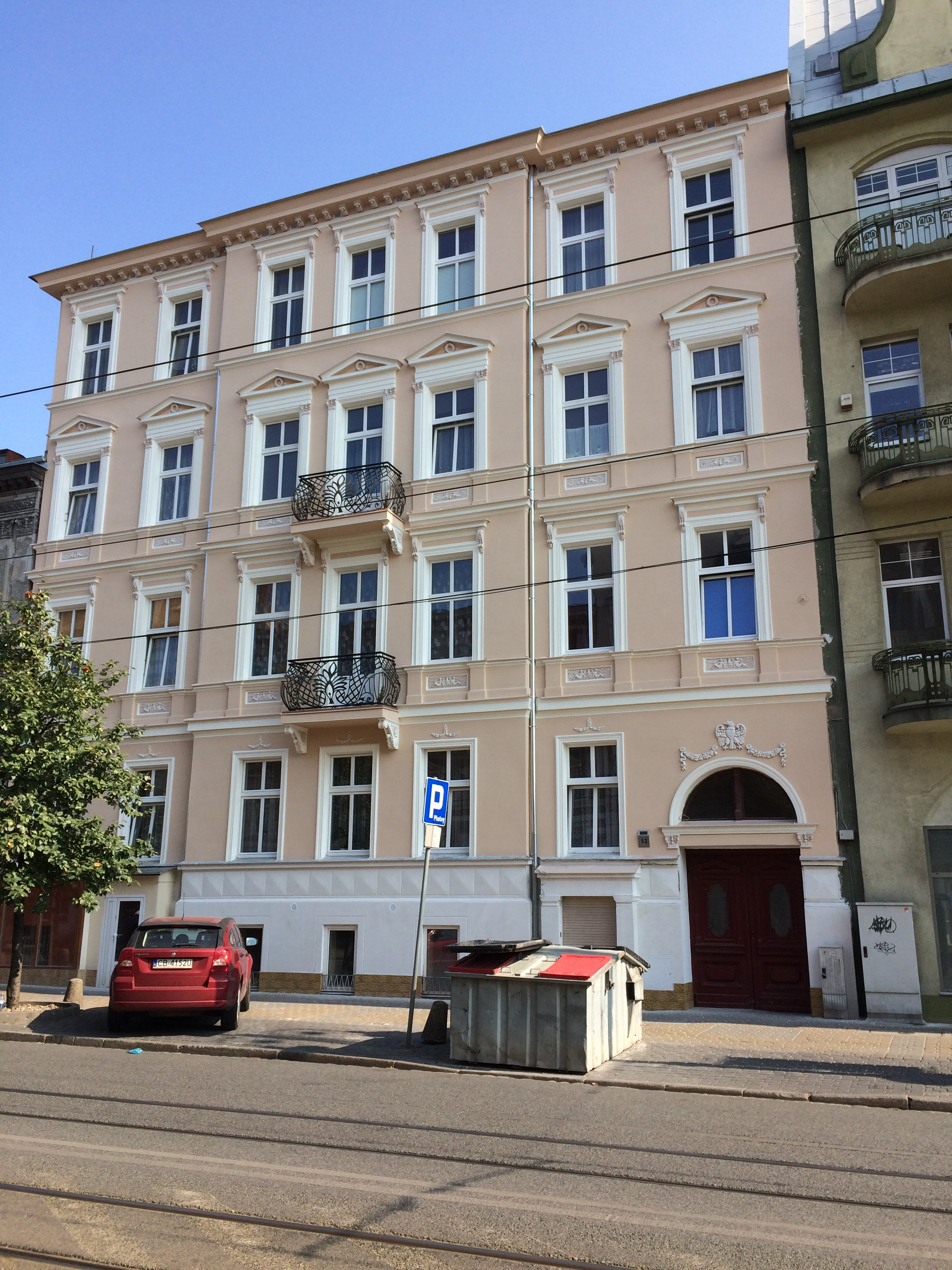
Main facade

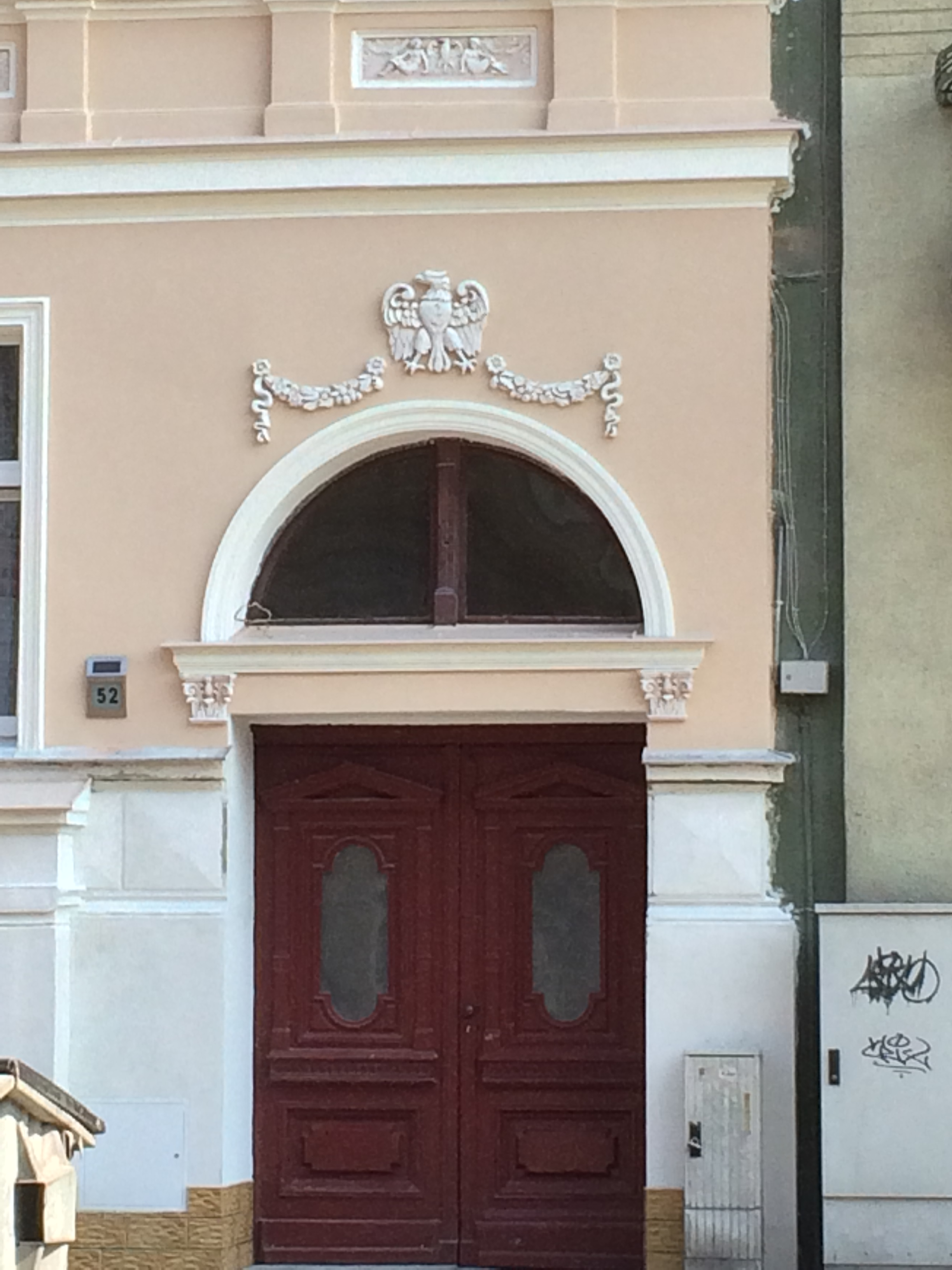
Door frame

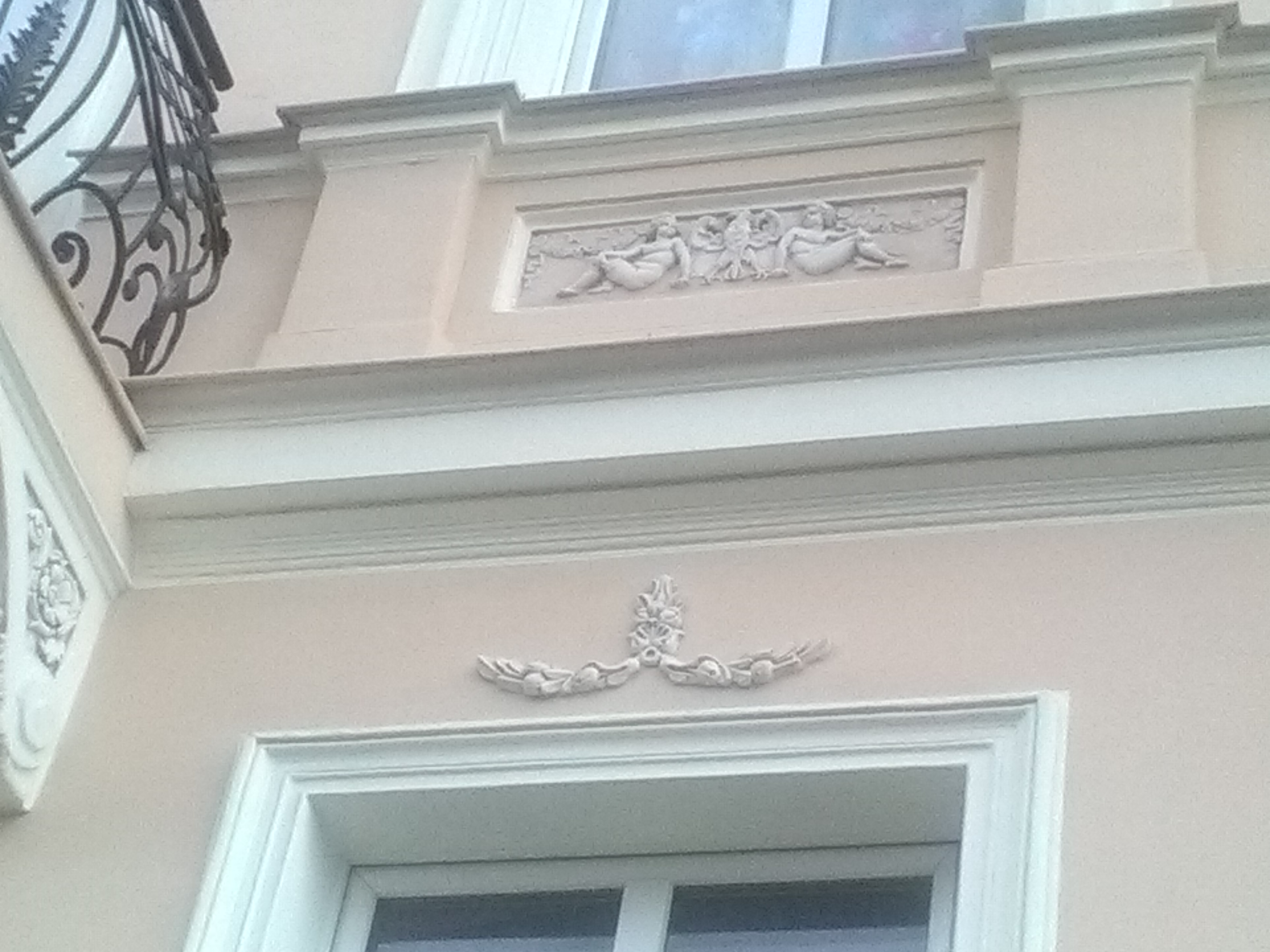
Cartouche detail

=== Tenement at 54 ===
Built in 1876 by Ferdinand Wiese and Joseph Stark, in 1926 by Paul Kuklinski

Eclecticism & Neo-Renaissance

The house was built for the gardener of Carl Berndt, owner of Nr.52. It has housed the Music School of Bydgoszcz from 1945 to the late 1950s.

The harmonious and symmetrical façade displays Corinthian pilasters, decorated cornice and a frieze with a stylized plant motifs and tonda decorated with the head of a boy. In 1926, the front of the building was rebuilt and adapted for commercial purposes, on a design by architect Paul Kuklinski. The entire edifice was renovated in 2018.

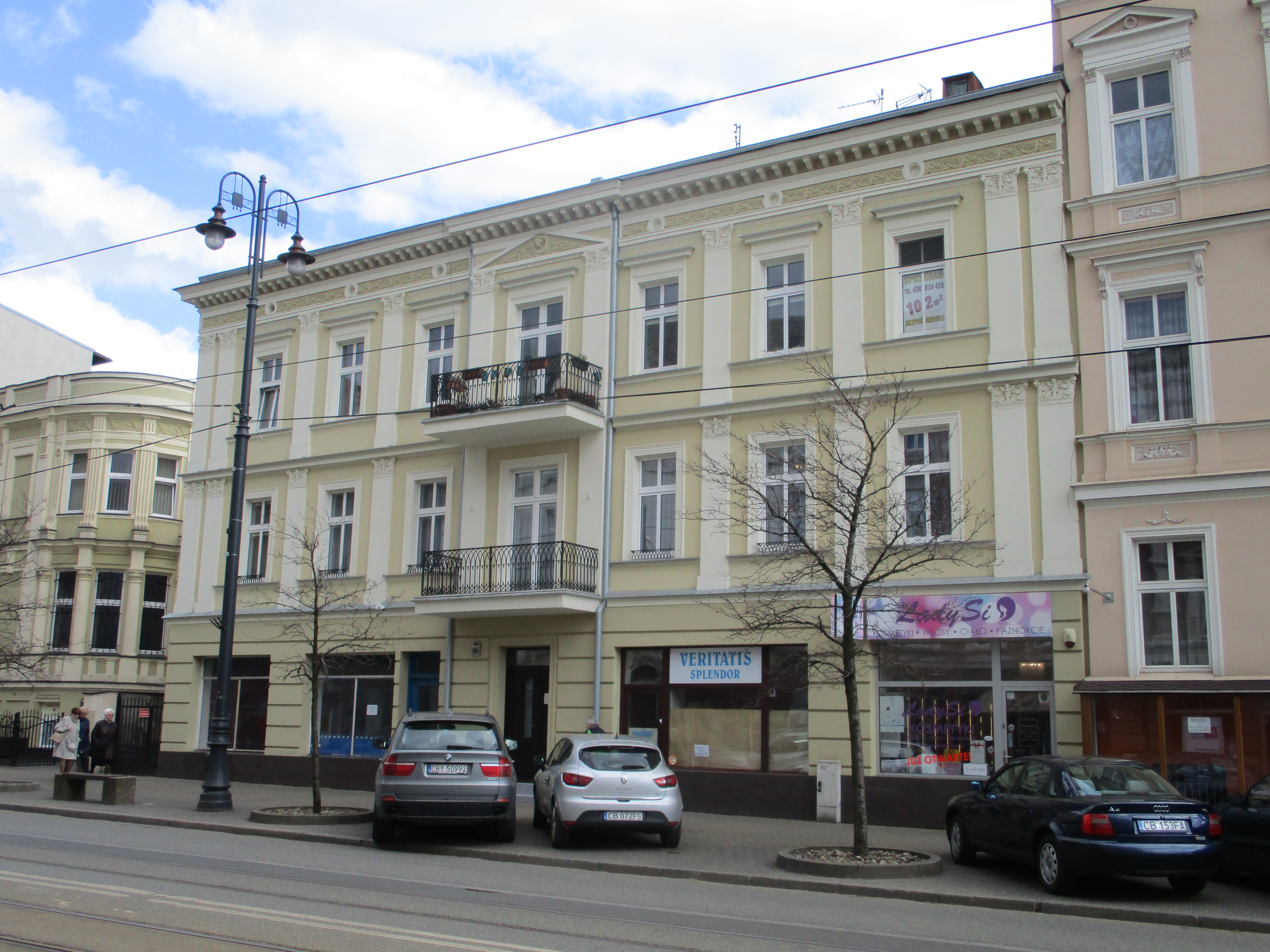
Main facade from the street

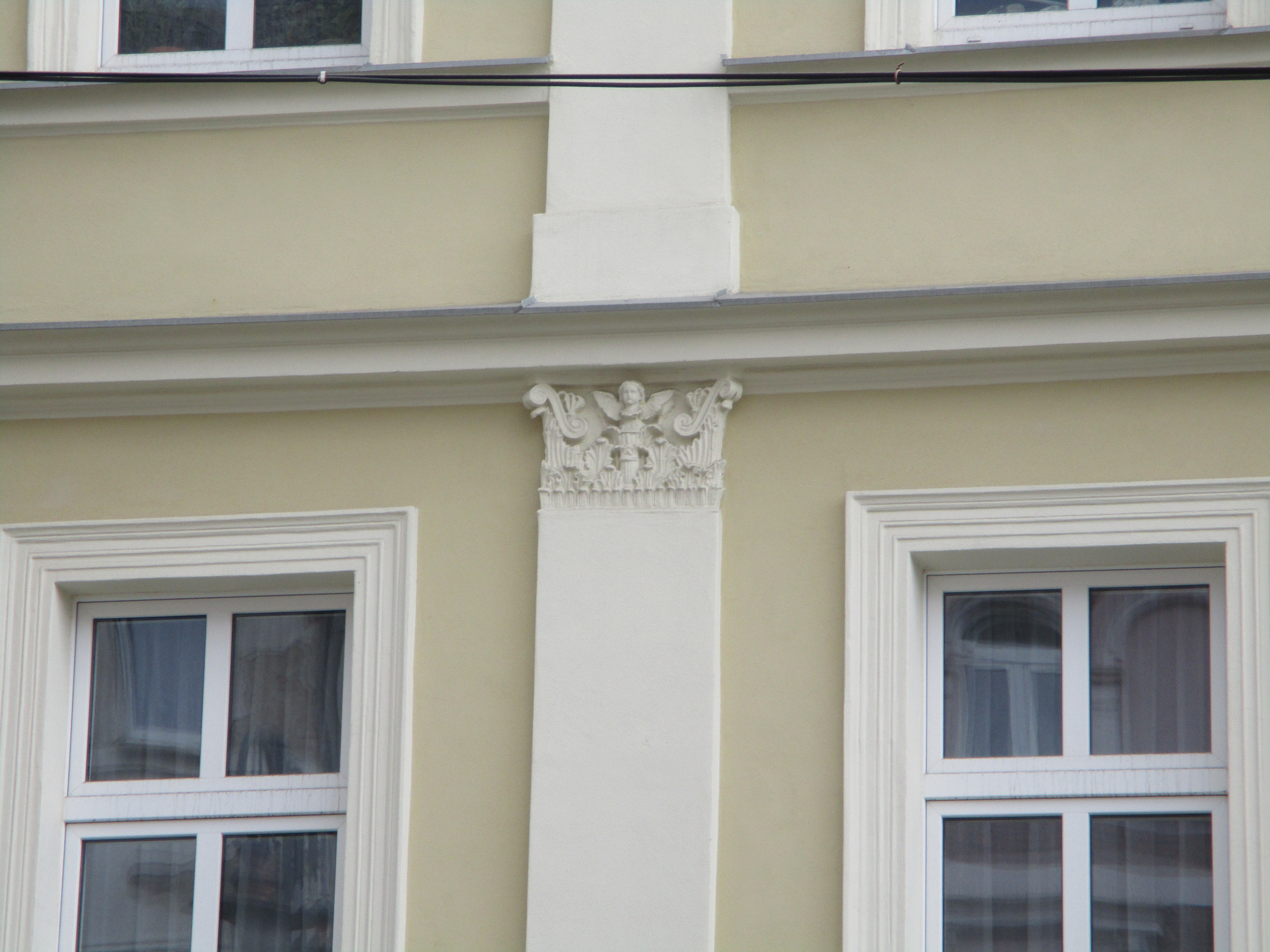
Detail of an adorned pilaster

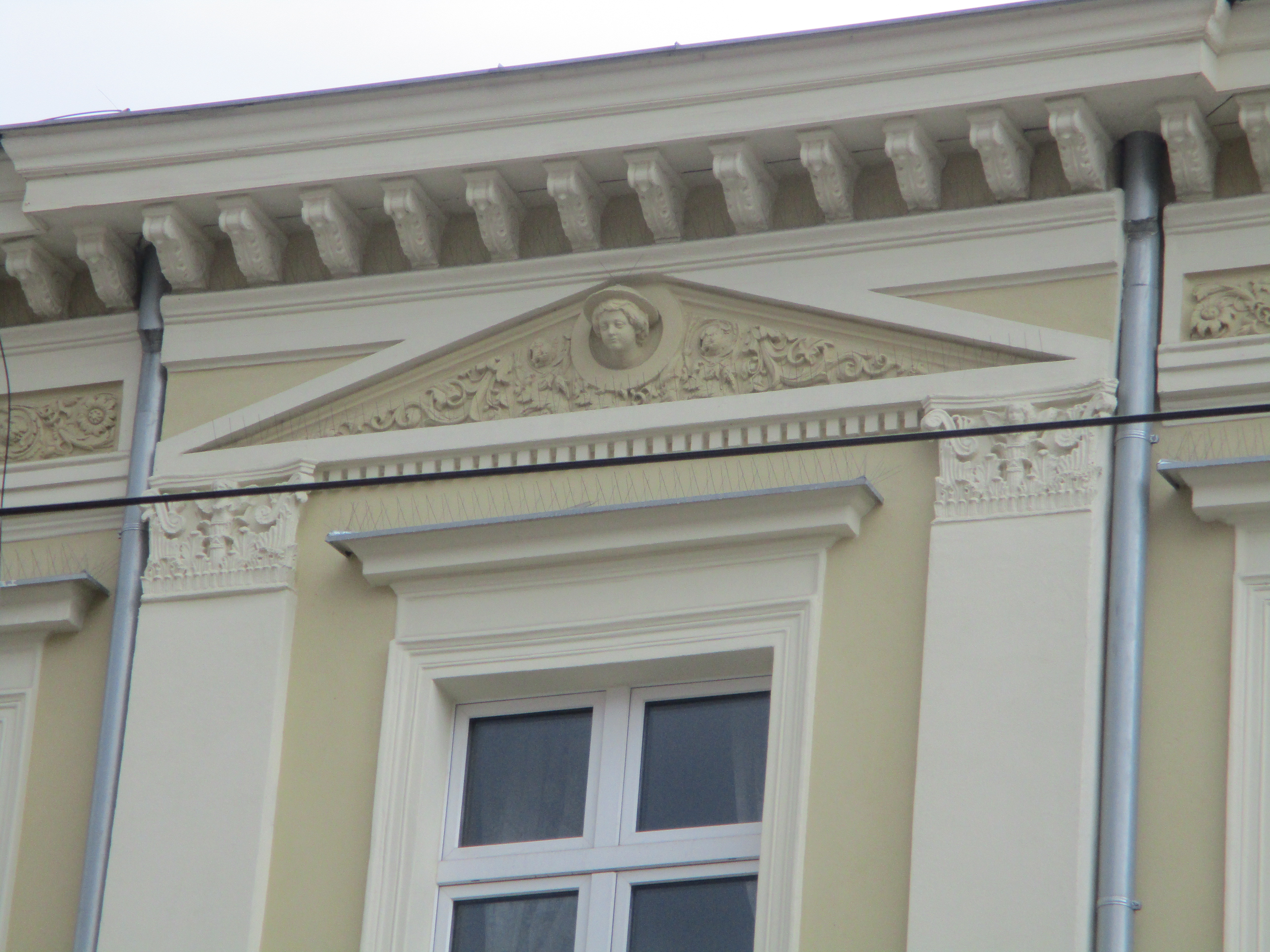
Pediment detail

=== Chapel of the Sisters of the Poor Clares, at 56 ===
1899

Modern architecture

Since February 16, 1946, a lifetime adoration is performed in the chapel.

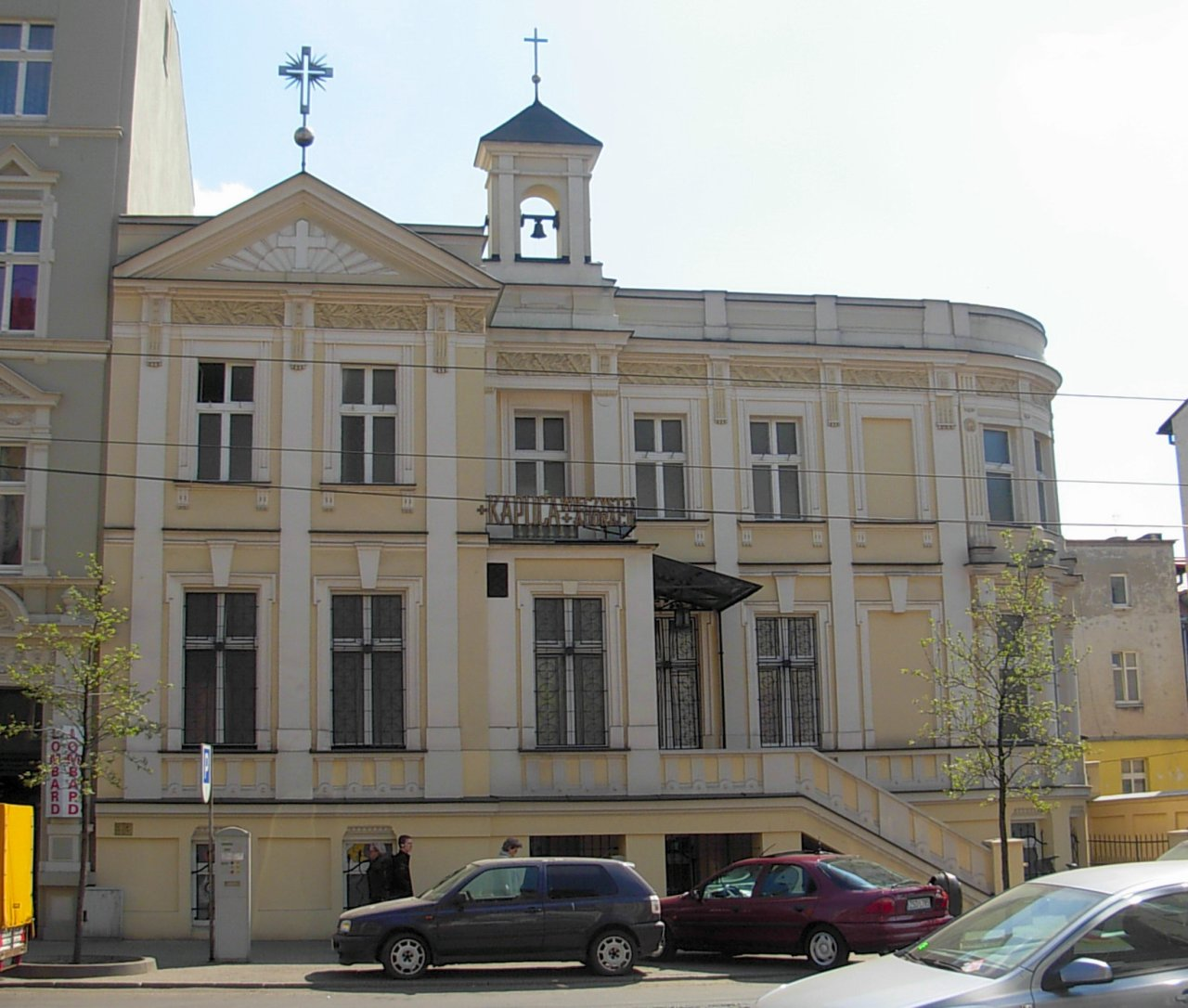
Facade onto Gdańska Street

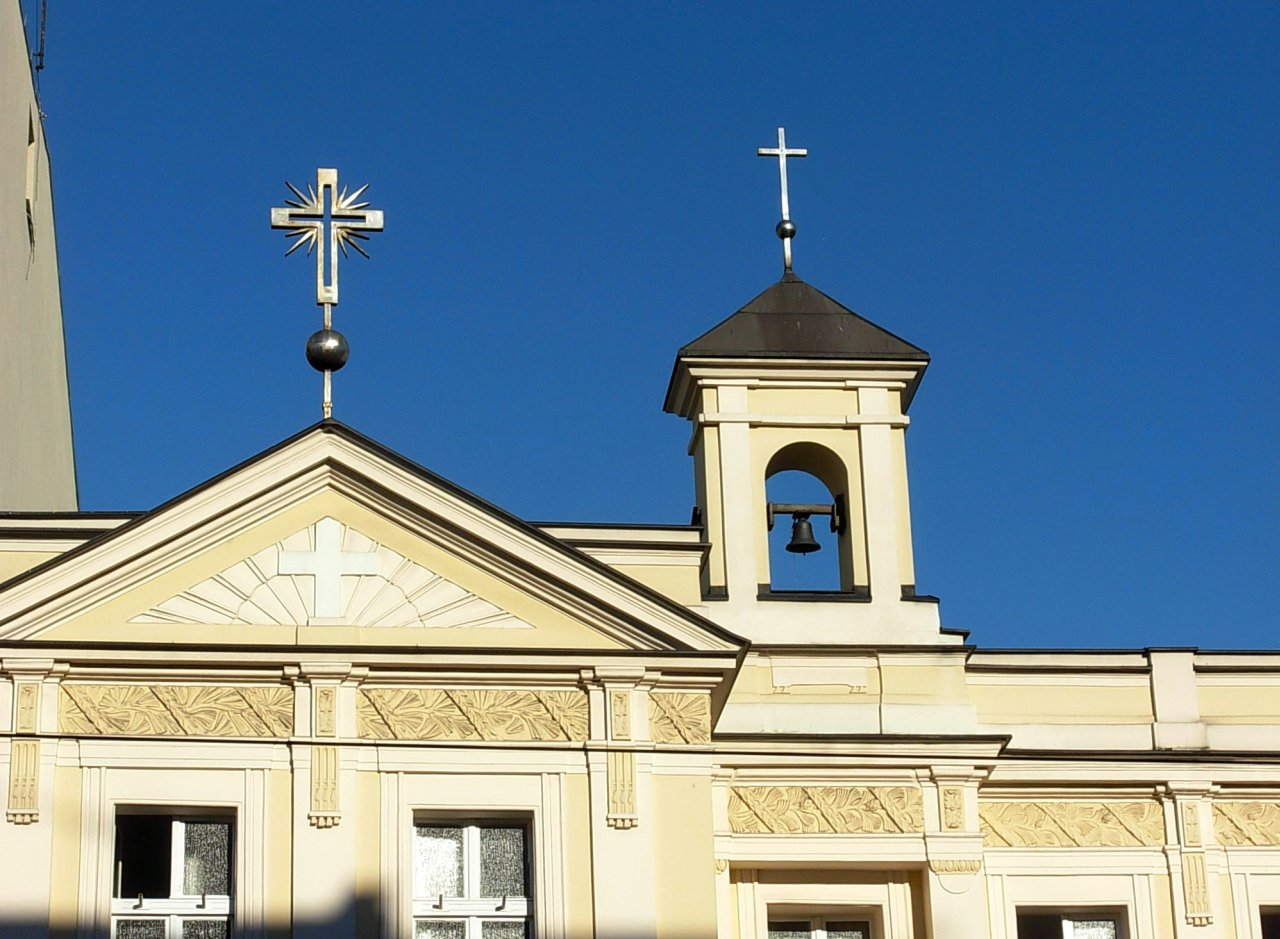
Detail of roof elements

=== Tenement at 57 ===
1870s

Eclecticism

First recorded landlord, at the then Danzigerstraße 32, was Johann Stößel.

The building has undergone a profound renovation in late 2018.

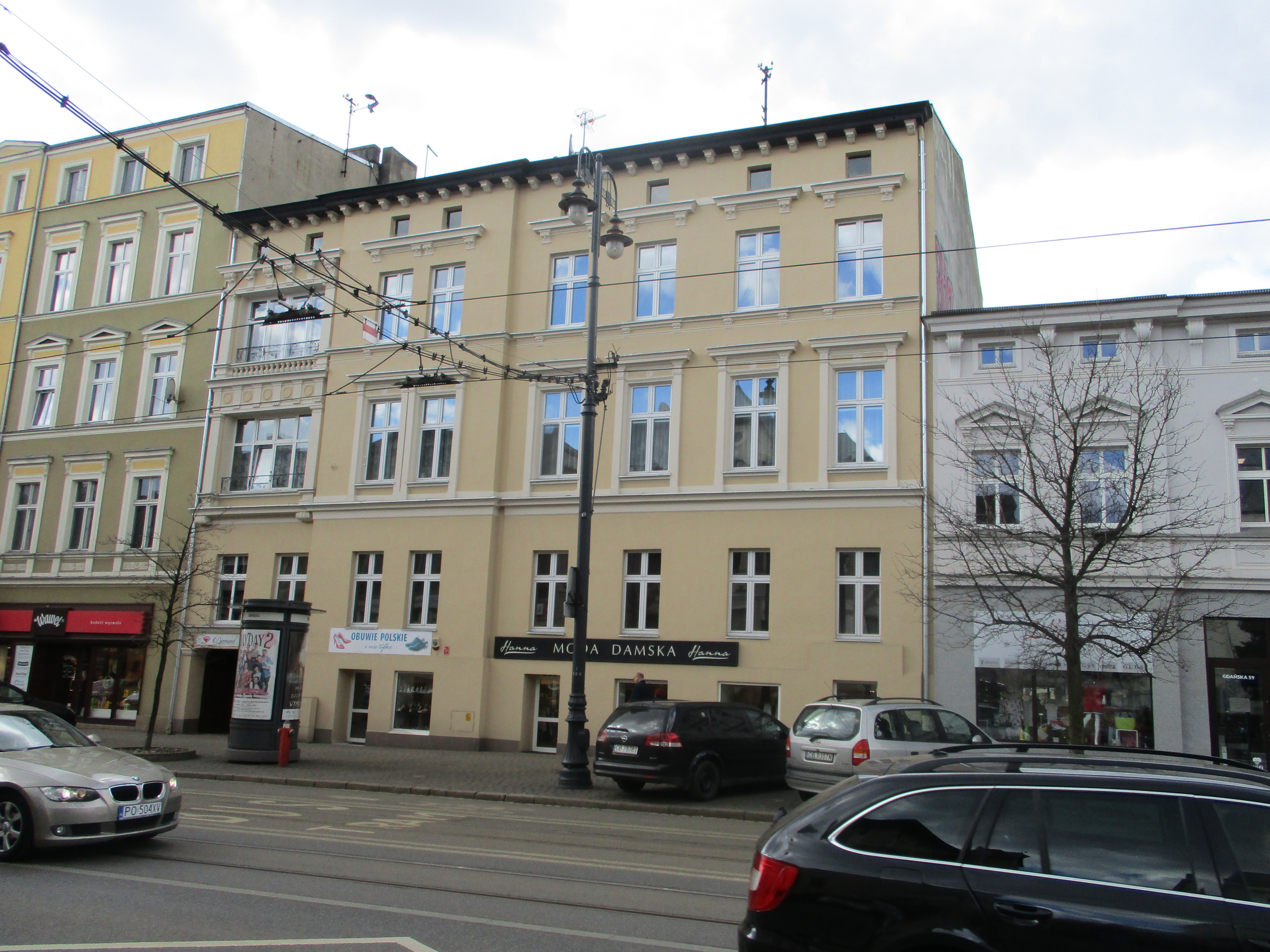
Facade onto Gdańska Street

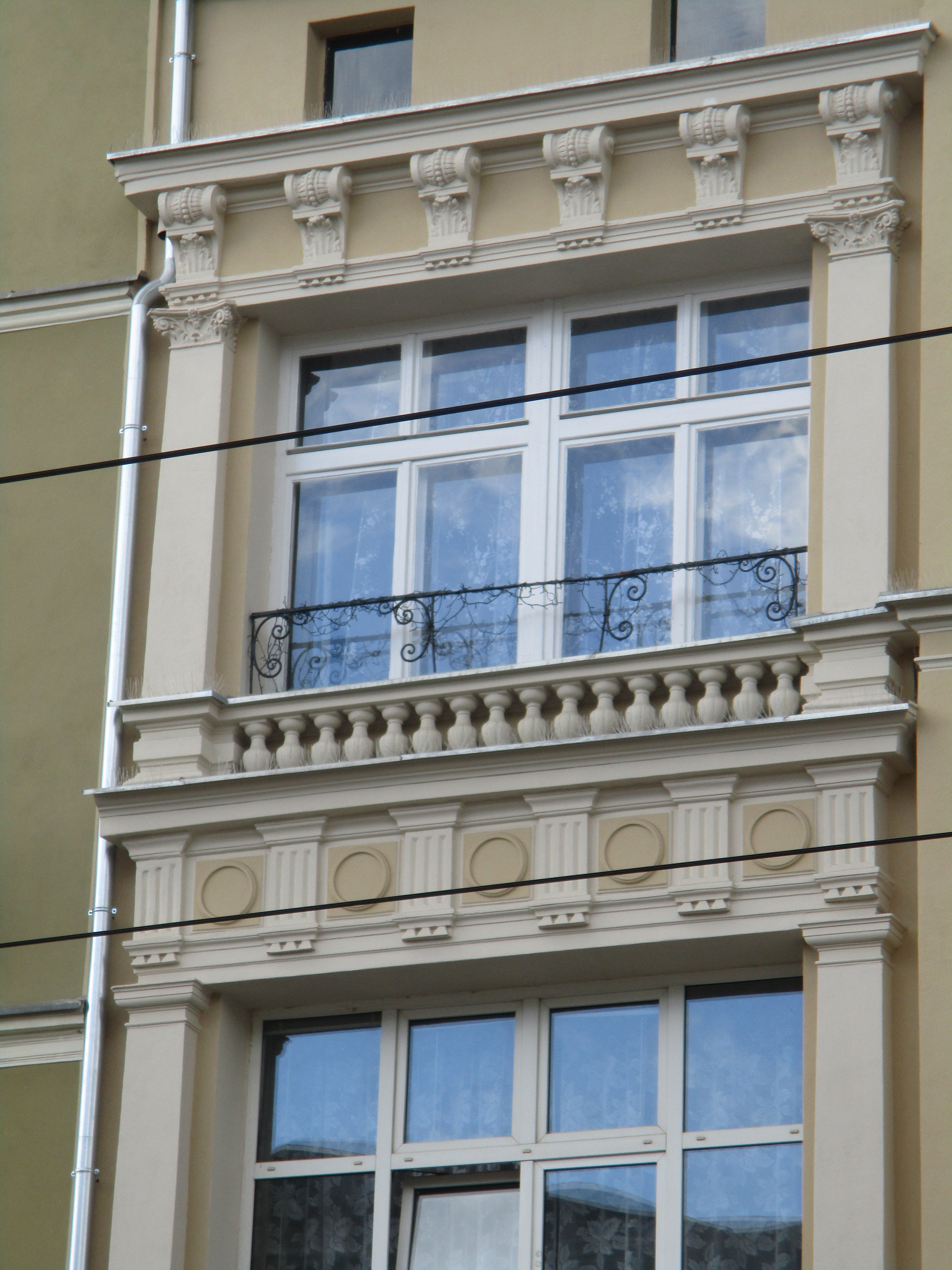
Details of architectural decoration

=== Aleksander Olszyński Tenement, at 58 ===
1894–1895, by Henrich Arndt

Neo-Renaissance, Neo-Baroque & Eclecticism

One can notice a preserved and rich Neo-Renaissance and Neo-Baroque stucco decoration on the facade.

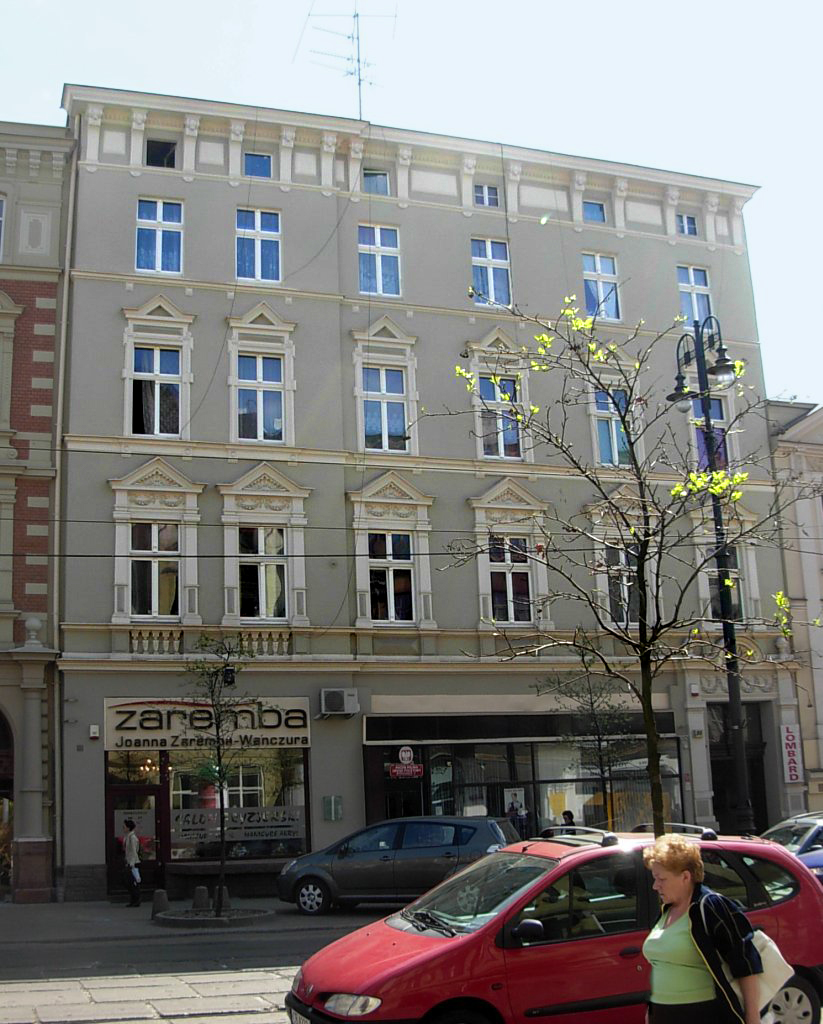
Main facade

=== Carl Meyer tenement, at 60 ===
1891–1892, by Carl Meyer

Eclecticism

A facade niche houses a sculpted allegory of Architecture and Construction.

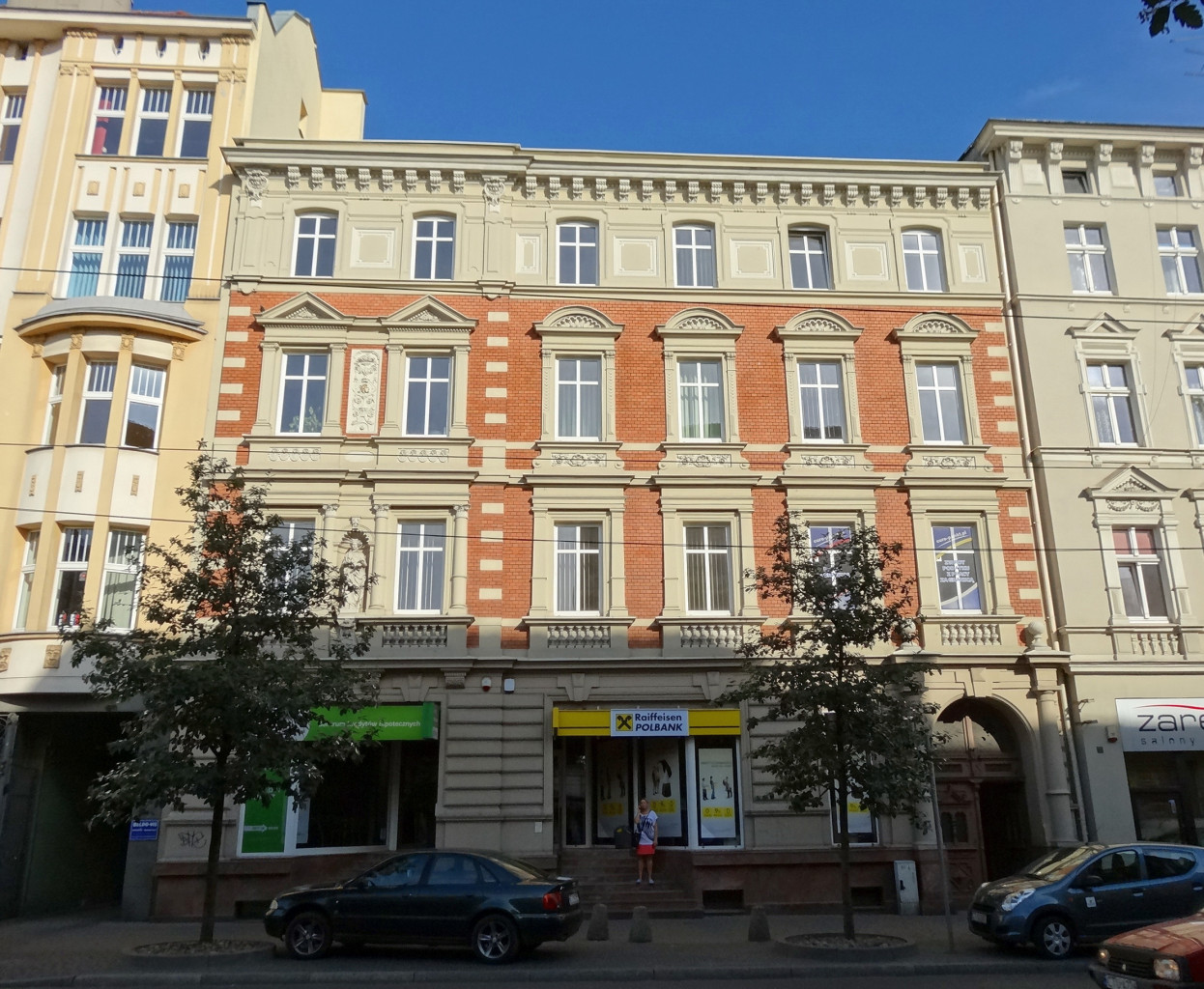
Main frontage

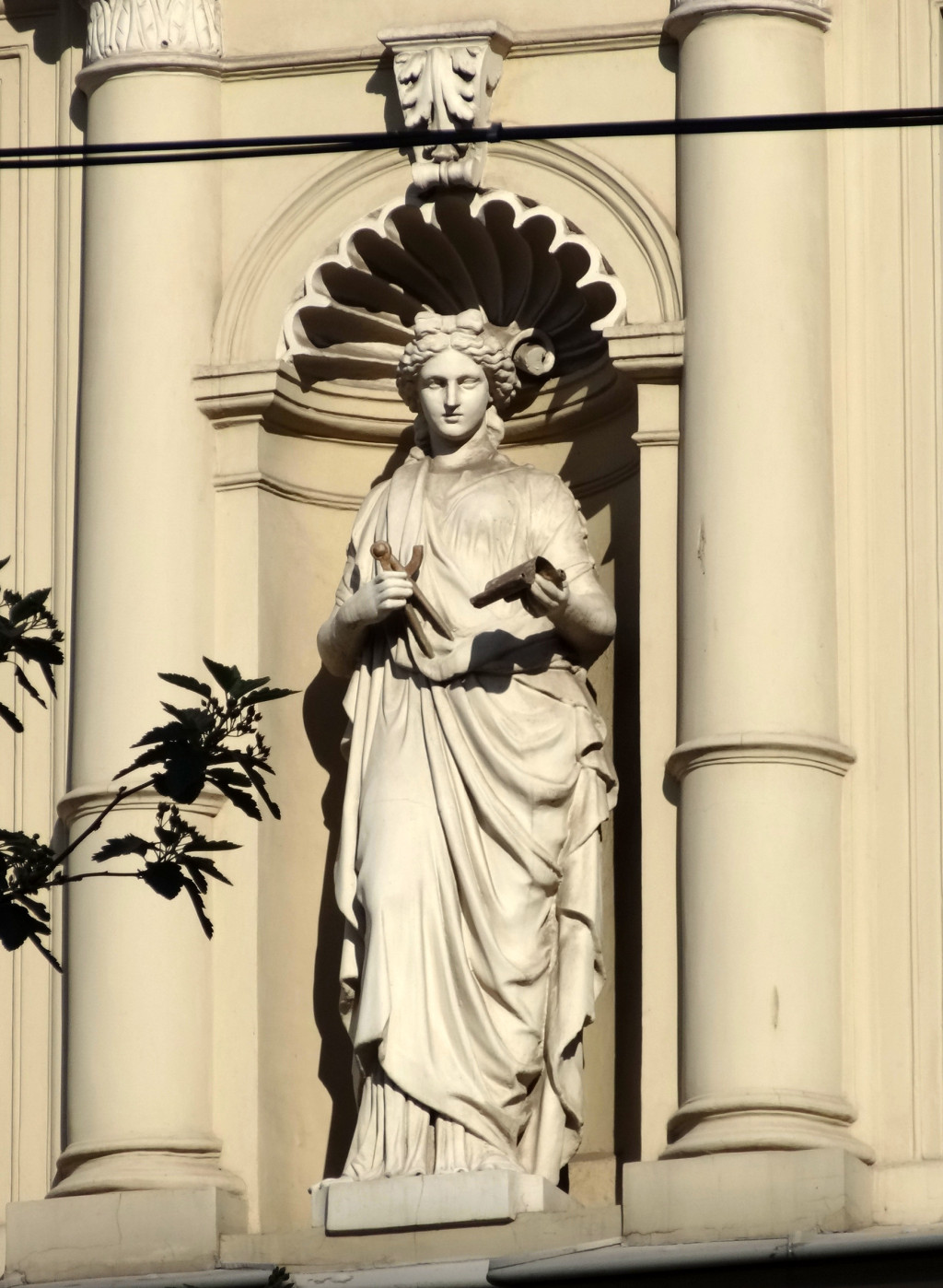
Architecture and Construction Allegory

=== Alfred Schleusener Tenement, at 62 ===
1910–1911, by Alfred Schleusener

Modern architecture

The architect Alfred Schleusener lived and worked there till 1944.

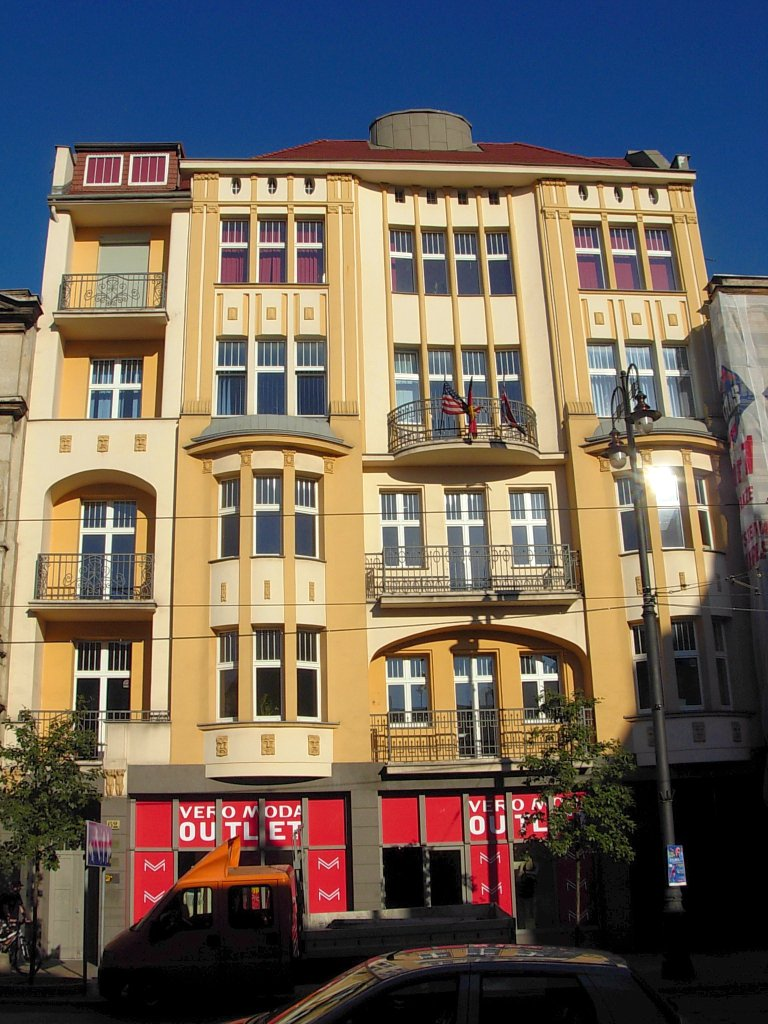
Main facade

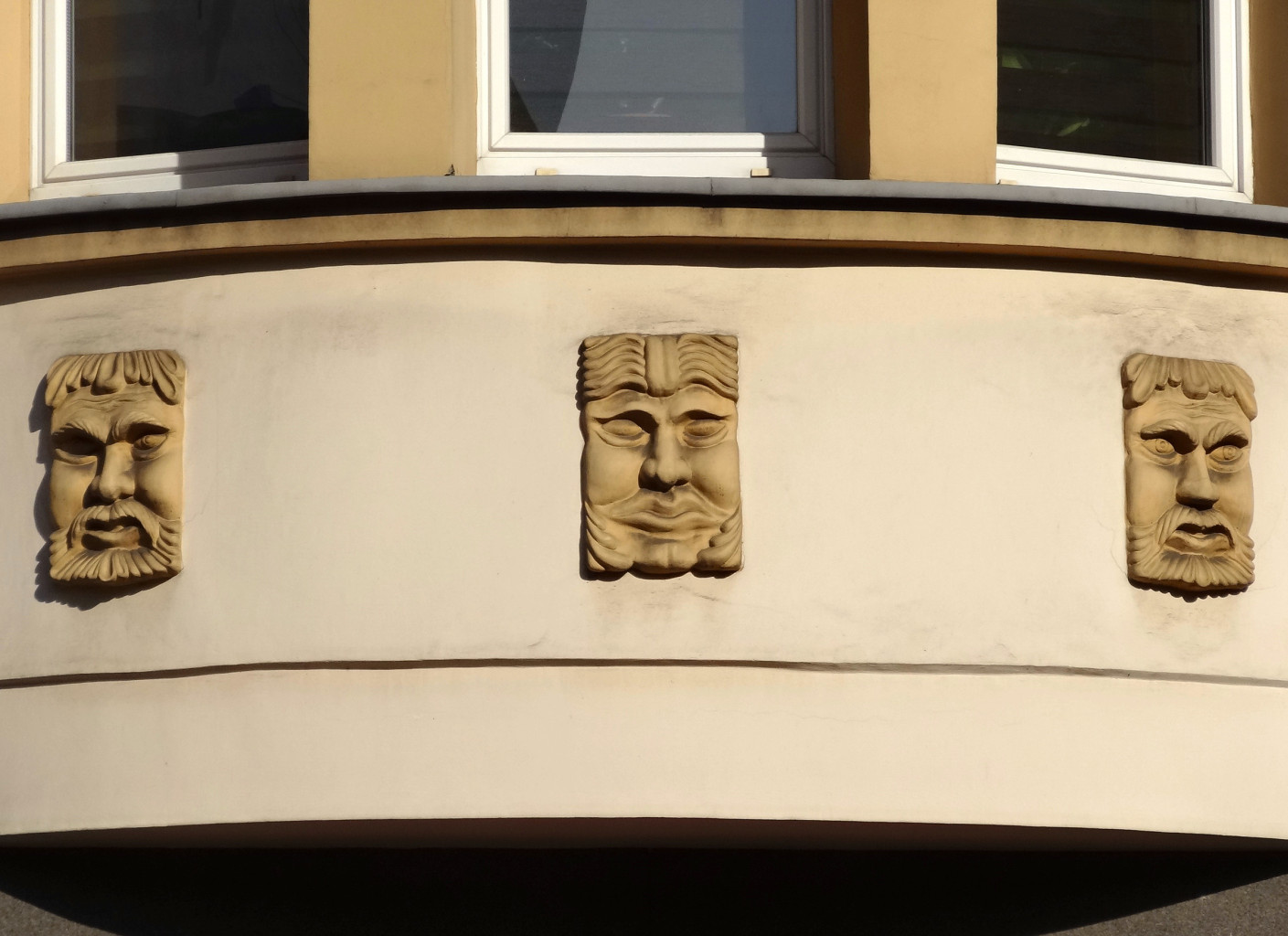
Detail of a loggia

=== Józef Święcicki tenement at 63 ===
Registered on Kuyavian-Pomeranian Voivodeship heritage list, Nr.601299-Reg.A/1059, August 26, 1996.

Built in 1895–1897, by Józef Święcicki

Eclecticism, Neo-Renaissance & Neo-Baroque.

House of architect Józef Święcicki, where he lived with his family and ran his business.

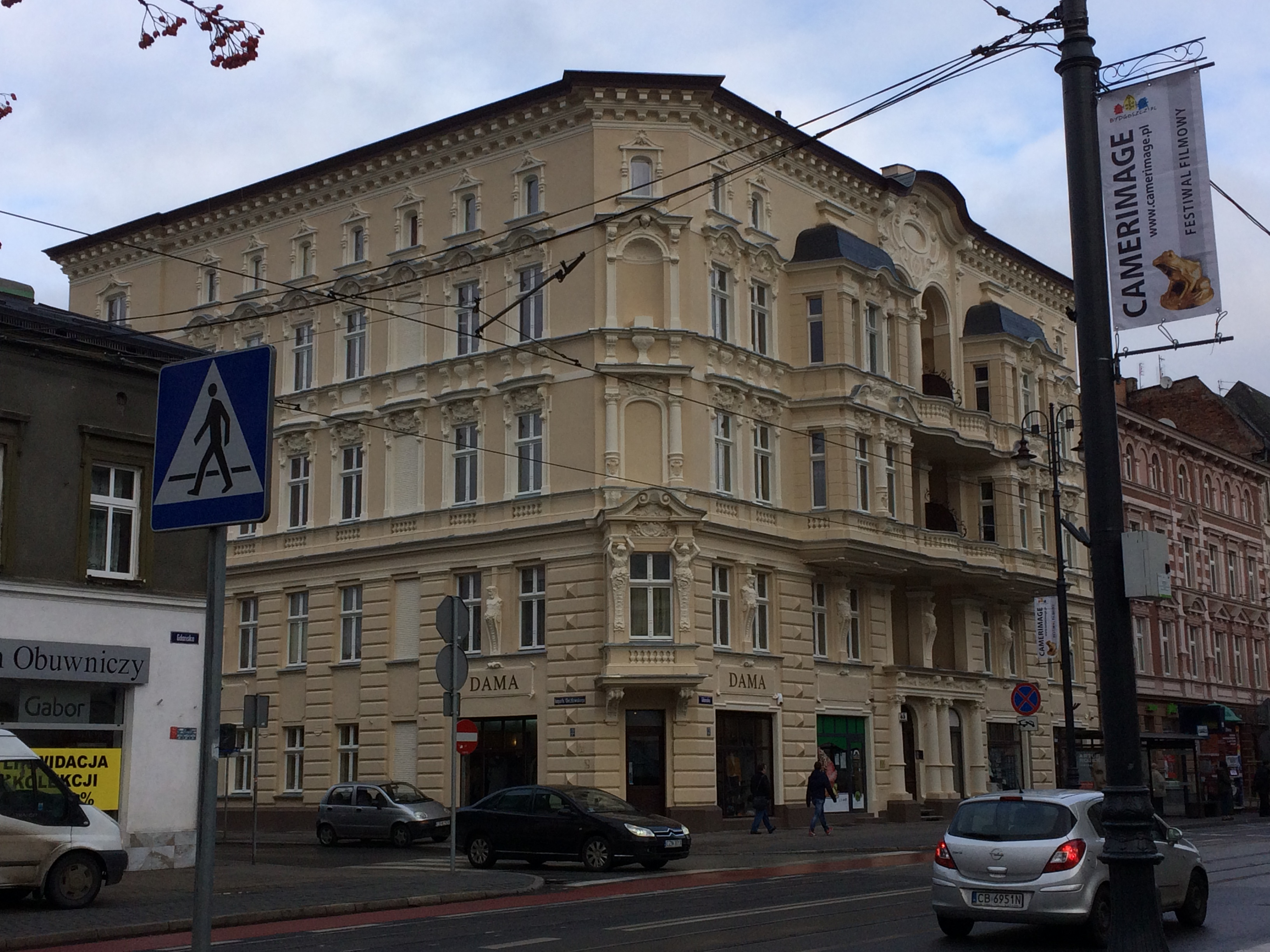
Main facades

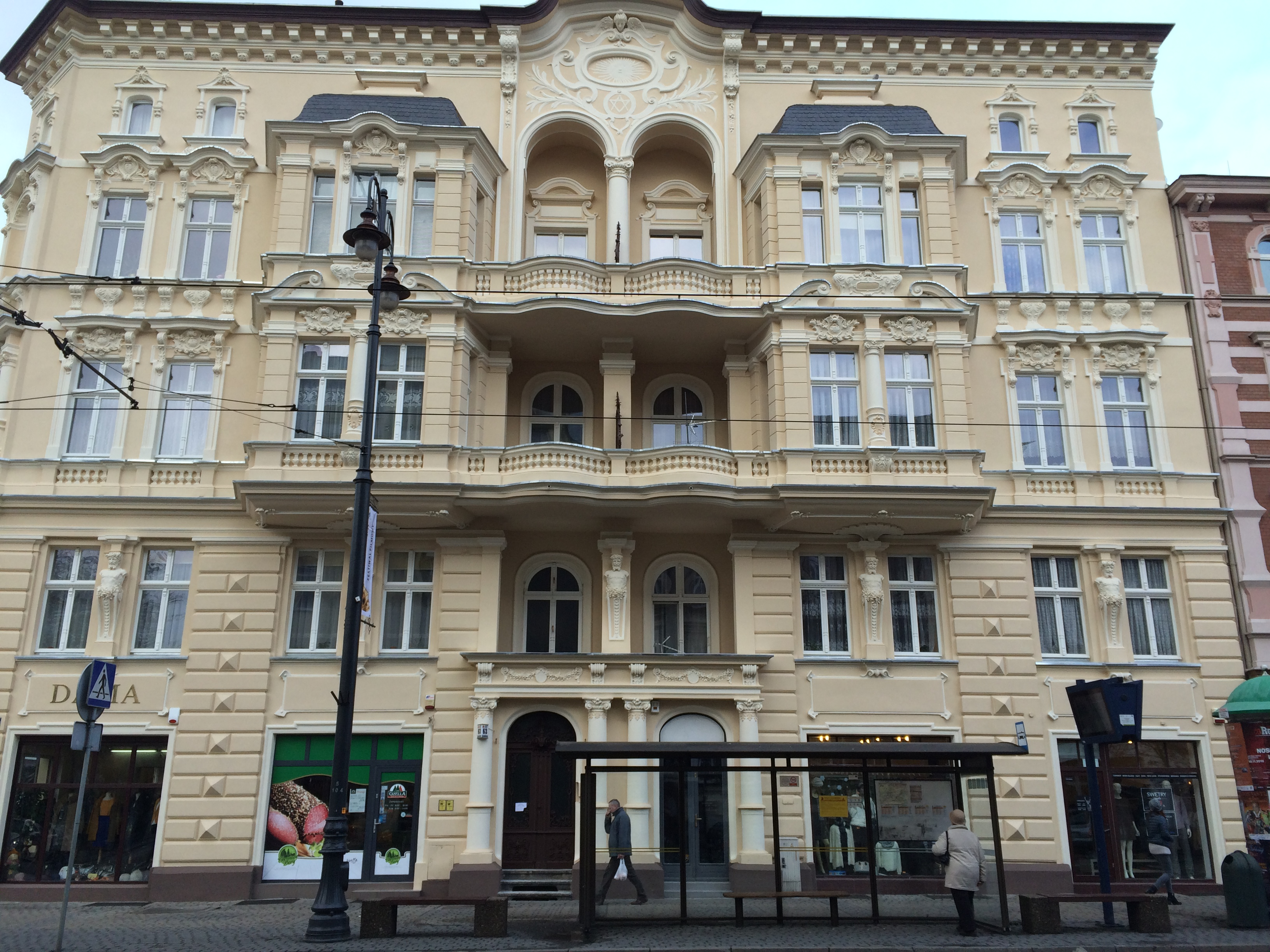
Facade from Gdańska Street

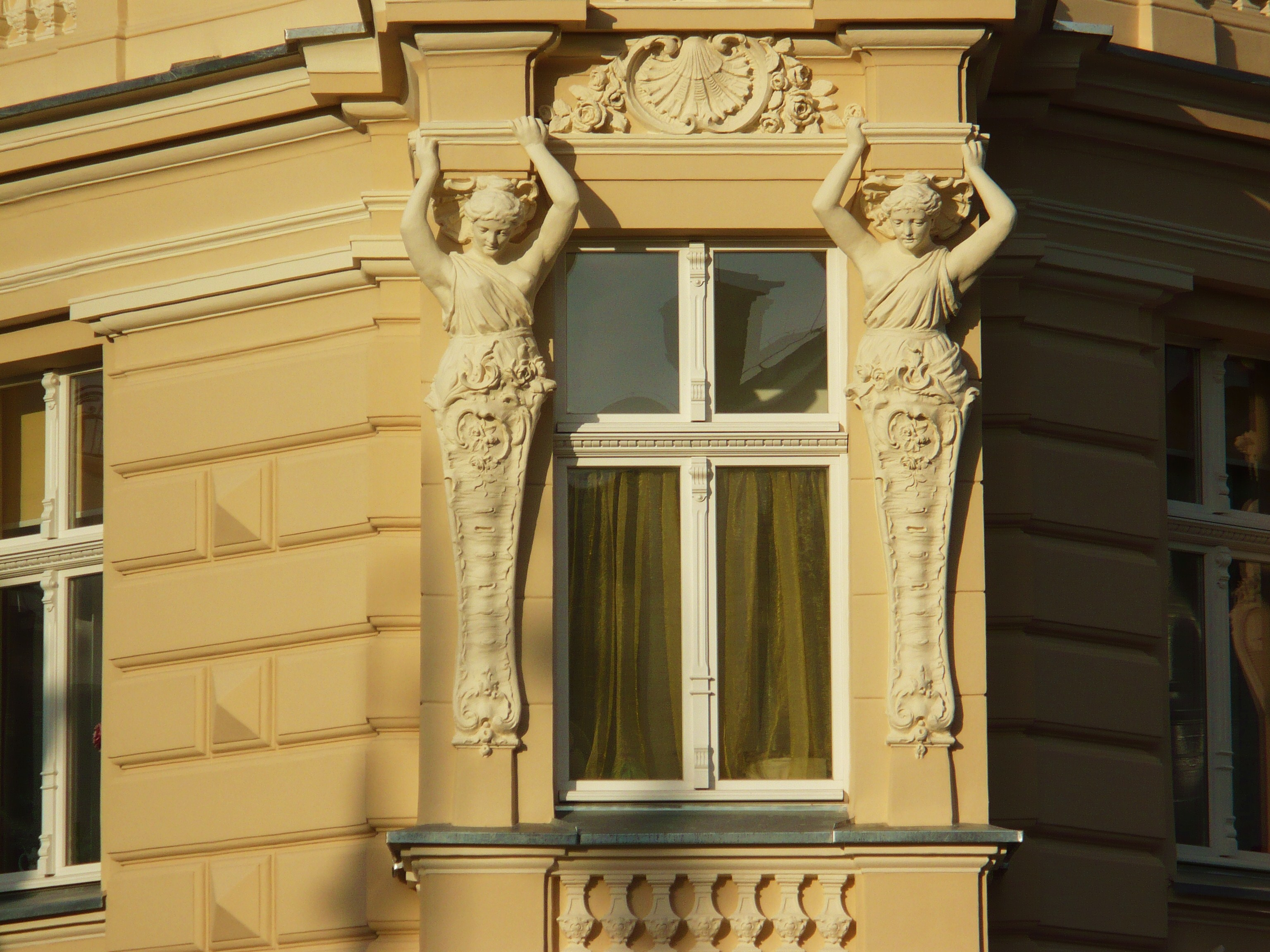
Caryatids on the corner

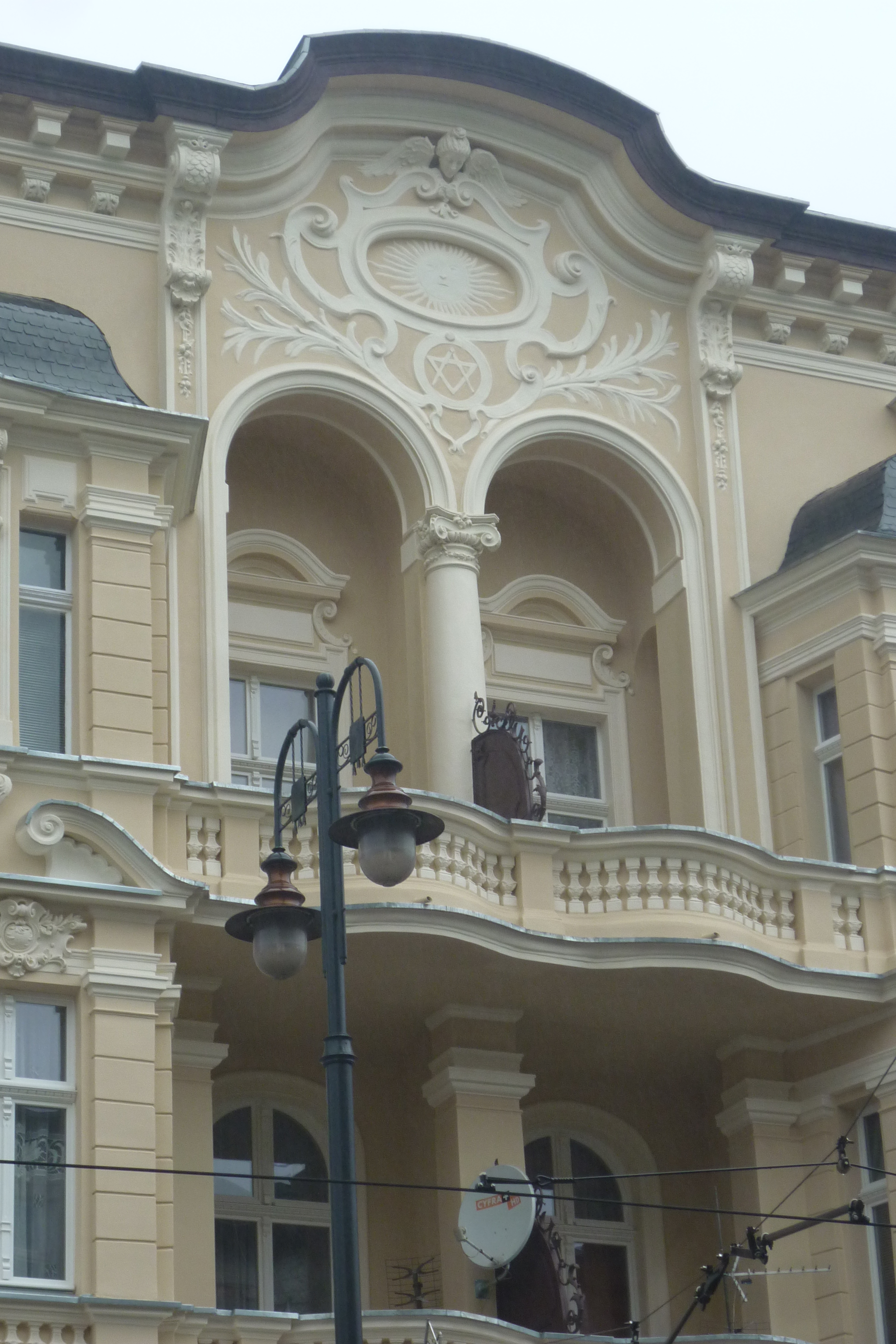
Detail of a balcony

=== Tenement at 64 ===
September 1889

Eclecticism.

First landlord at then Danzigerstraße 136 was Józef Swięcicki, a building construction manager. It passed then to Hermann Bluementhal "the joung", a merchant and then to Bruno Straszewski, a horse dealer till the end of World War I.

The high elevation displays Eclectic style: neo-classic details (pedimented windows, symmetry, pilasters), bossage on the ground floor or a man figure placed at keystone position of the right arched window.

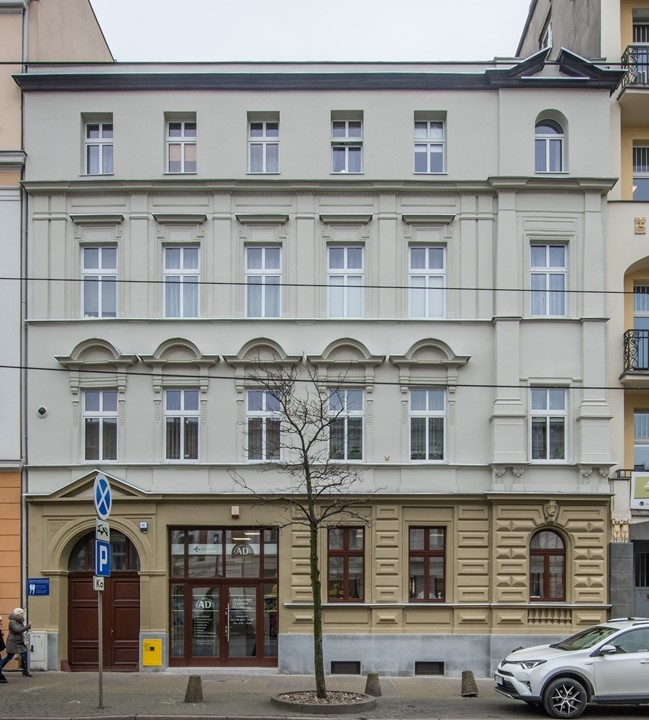
Main elevation after 2020 renovation

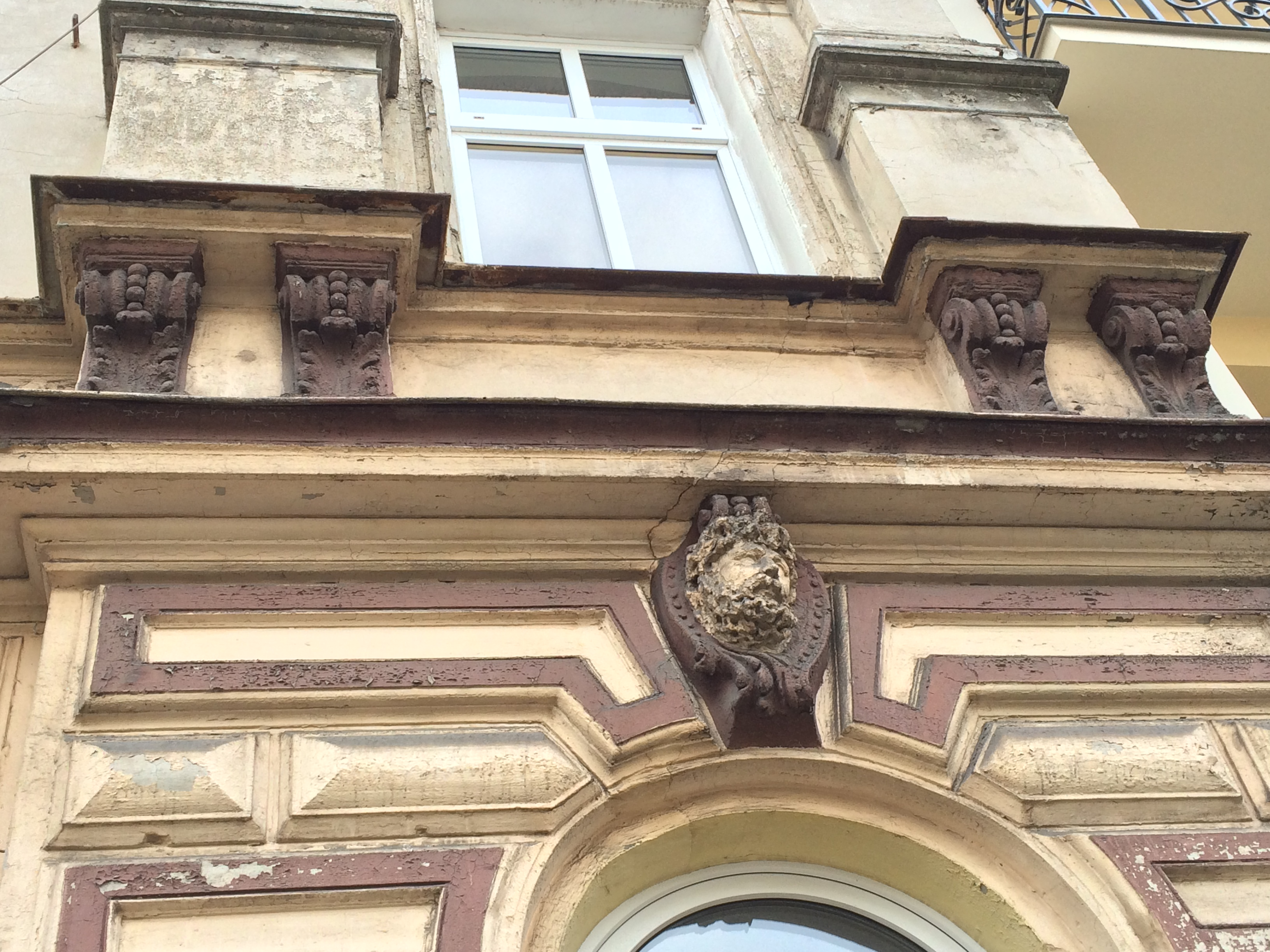
Detail of ground floor decoration

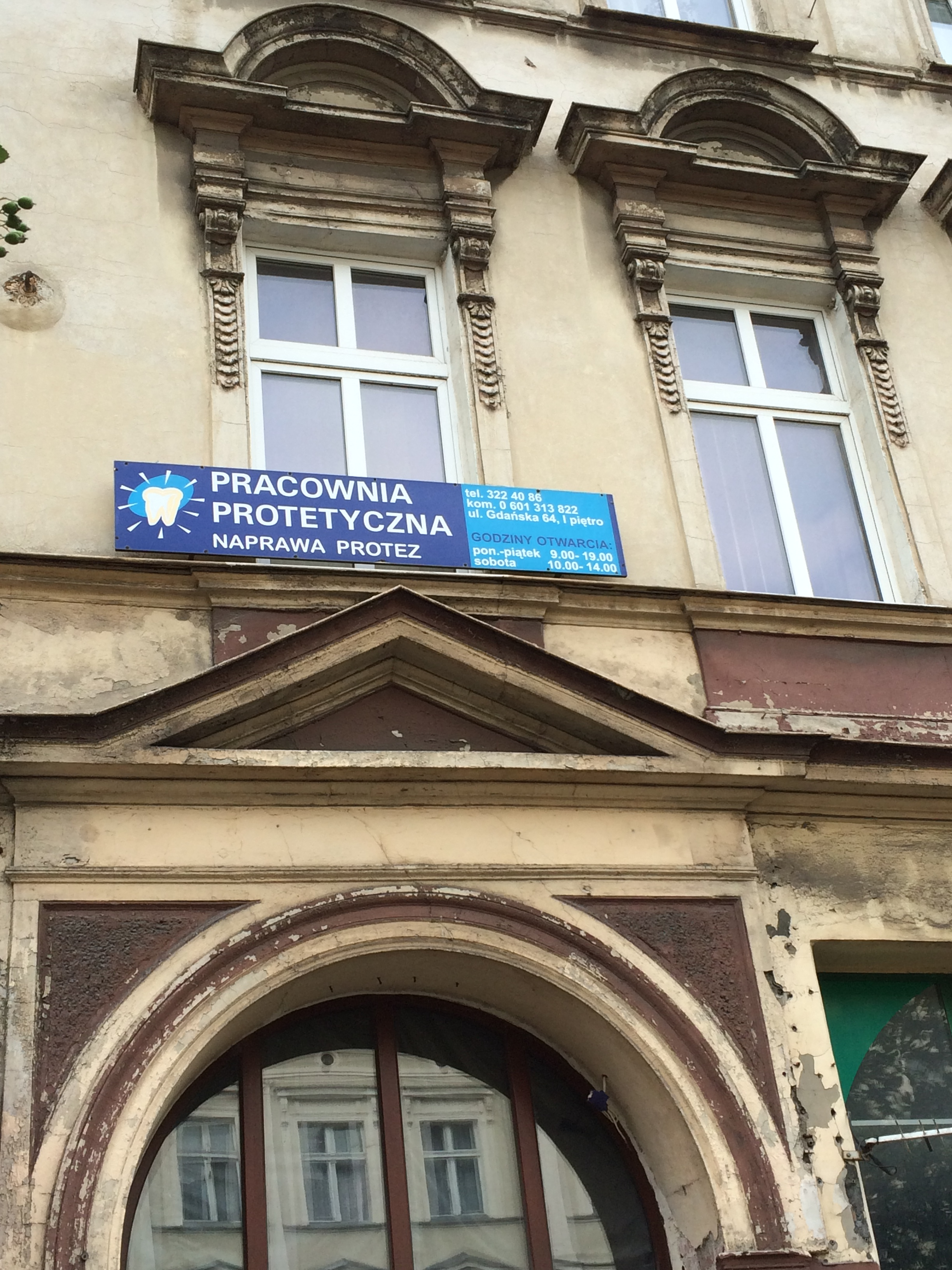
Windows pediment and corbels

=== Tenement at 65 ===
1891

Eclecticism.

This building at then Danzigerstraße 39 had been the property of Benjamin Bogs, registered as a "gardener". At the beginning of the 20th century, he opened here a shop of fruit juices and wine ("Bromberger Obstweinkelterei"). In the early 1910s, a pharmacy operated at this location, first by Dr. Boehnel, then by Otto Parsenow (1915) During interwar, the pharmacy named Pod Aniołem (English: Under the angel) was owned by Hipolit Wallicht.

The eclectic frontage has been renovated in 2014–2015. The brick background highlights neo-classic elements, pedimented windows, pilasters and an adorned corbel table.

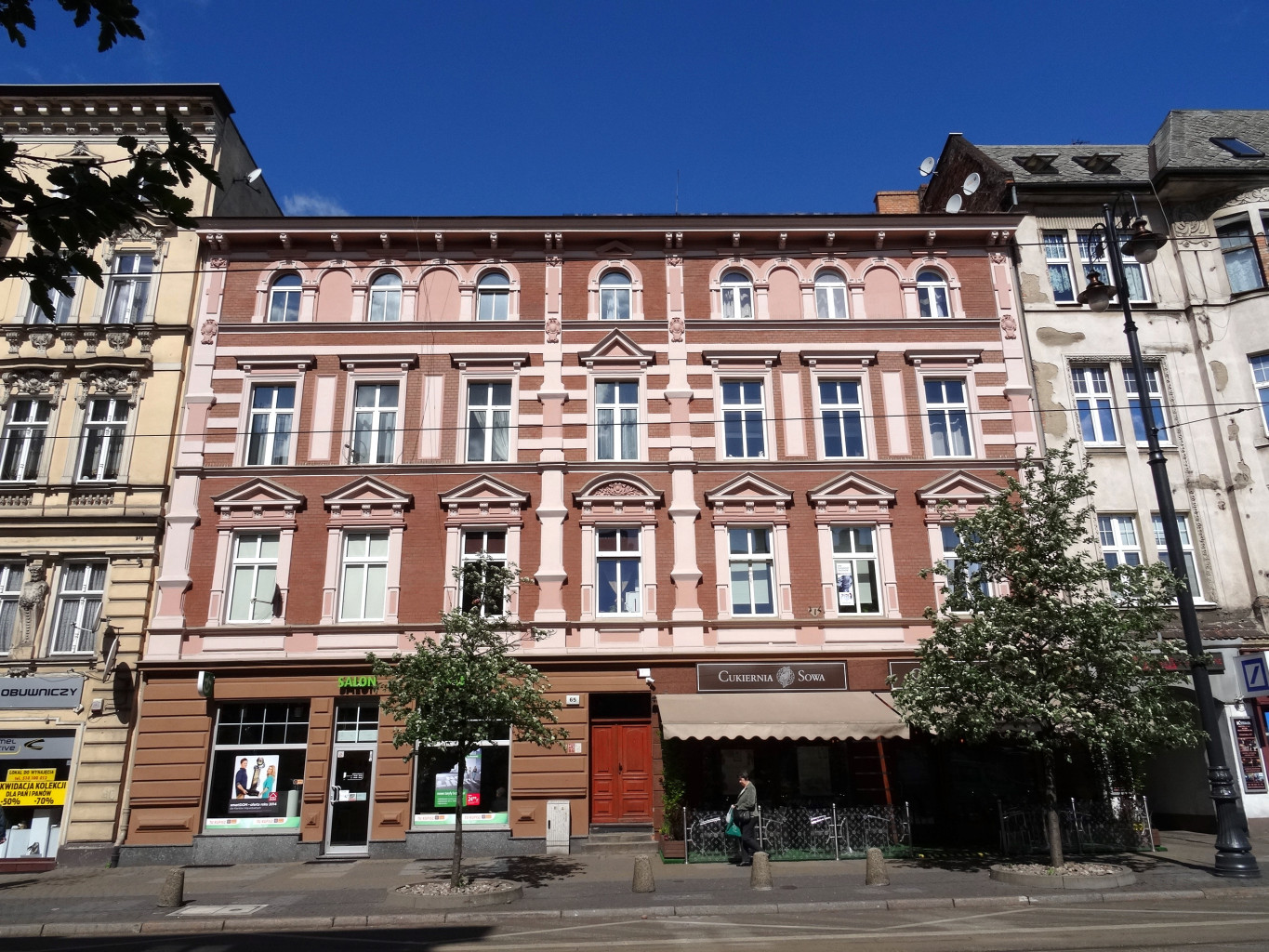
Renovated frontage

=== Eduard Schulz Tenement at 66/68 ===
Built in 1904–1905, by Rudolf Kern

Art Nouveau

In 1949, in the back garden, was built the actual Polish Theatre.

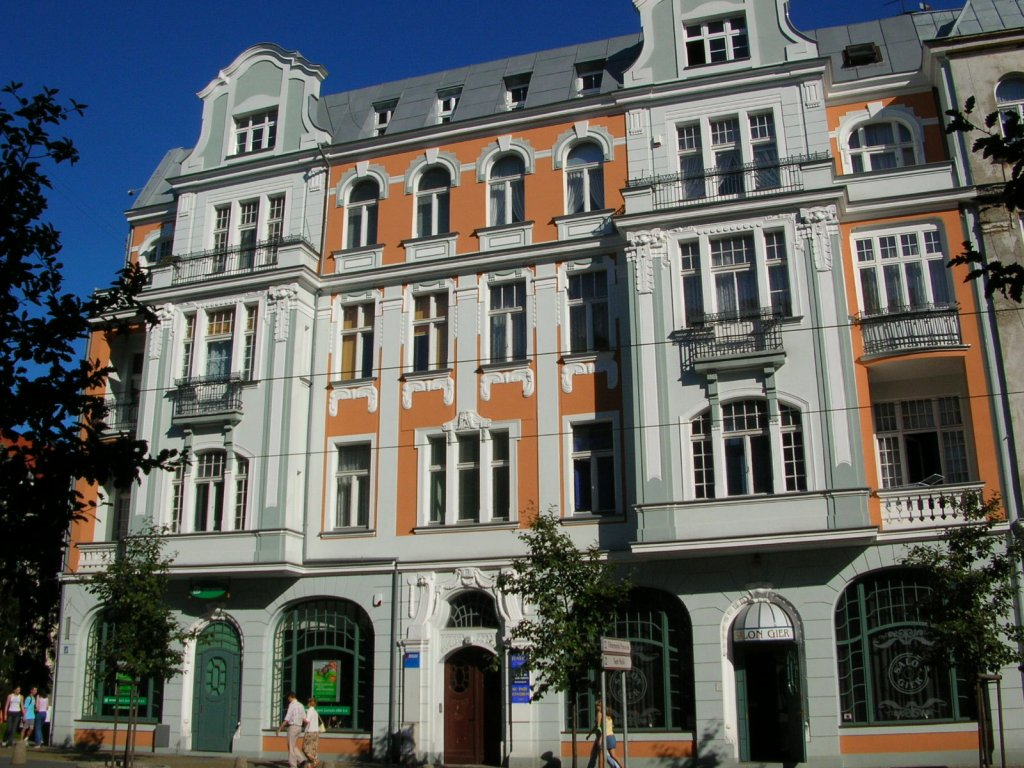
Main frontage

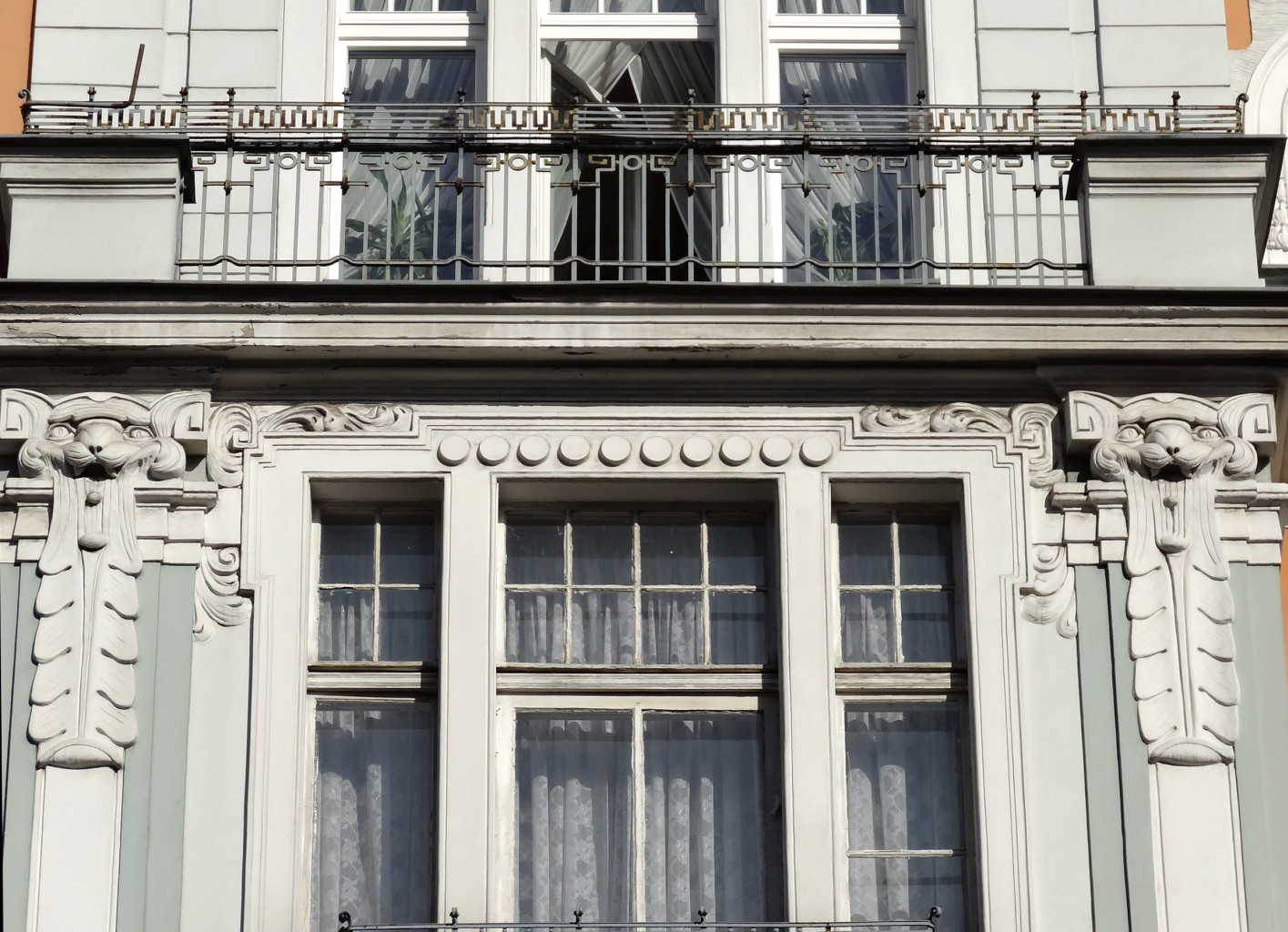
Detail of the frontage decoration

=== Tenement at 67 ===
1910–1911, by Rudolf Kern

Modern architecture & Art Nouveau

The building presents characteristics of the first decade of the 20th century with early forms of modern architecture.

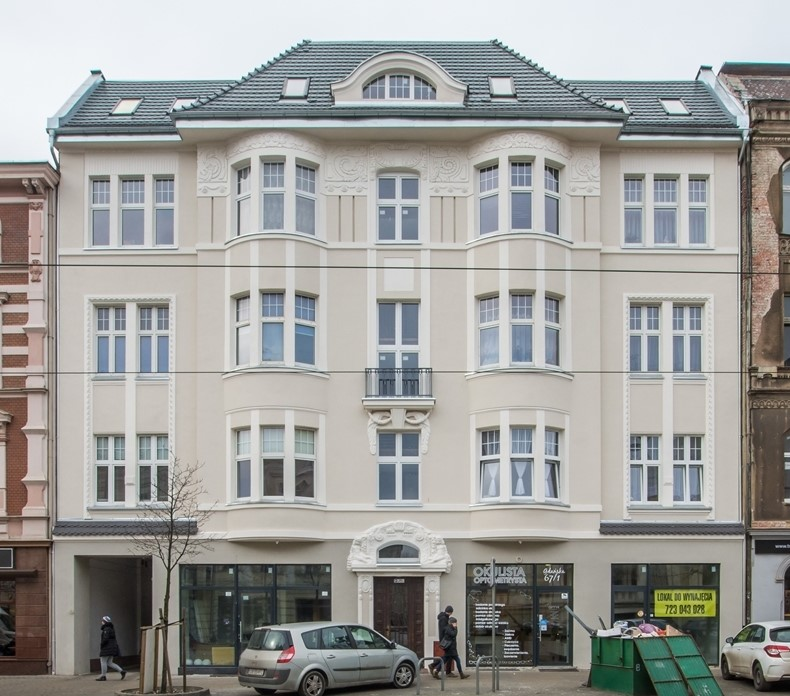
Facade after renovation

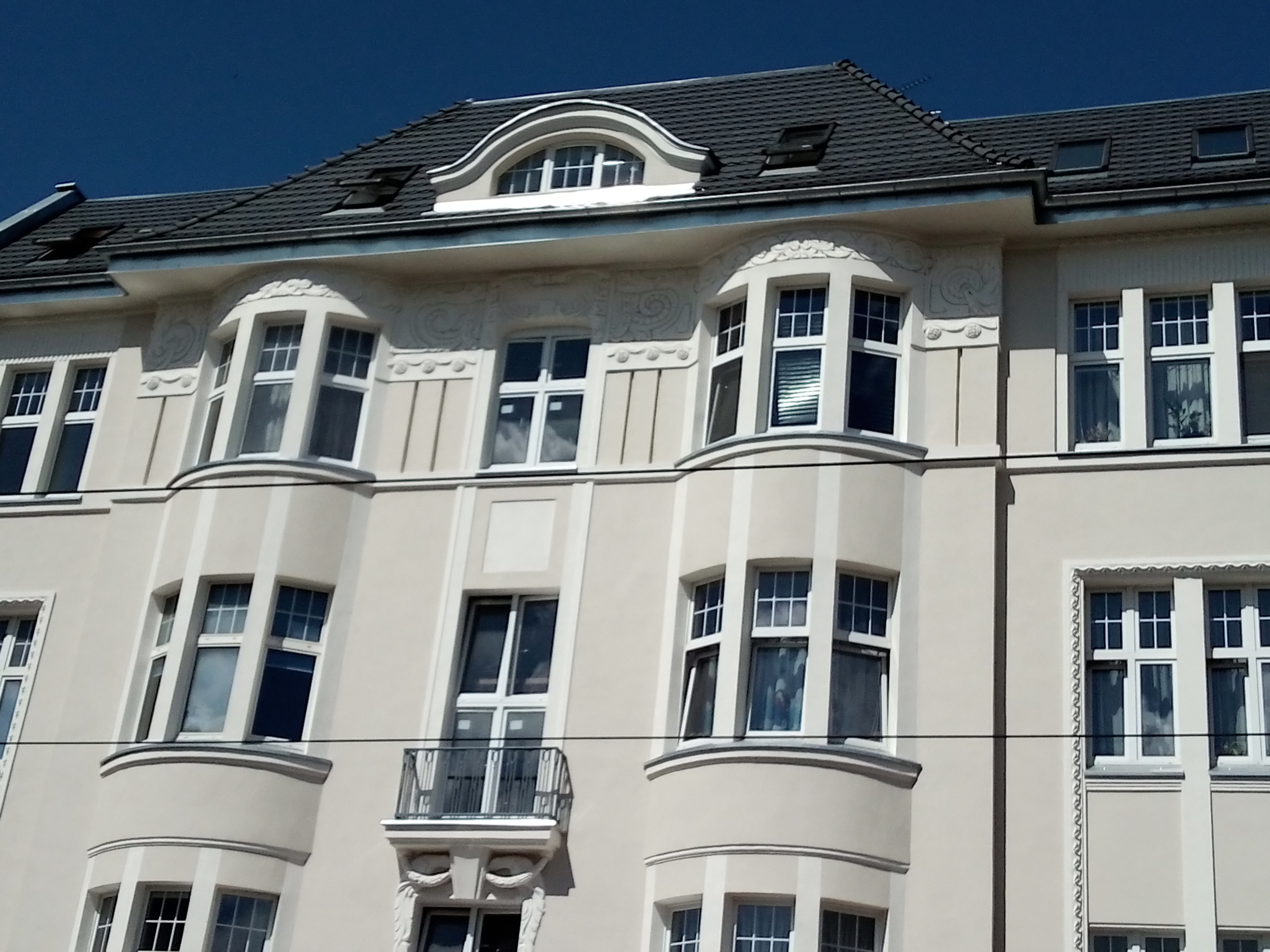
Facade detail after renovation

=== Tenement at 69 ===
1896, by Józef Święcicki

Eclecticism & Neo-Gothic.

The tenement has been commissioned by Ludwik Winnicki, a merchant dealing in flour, so as to get a living and commercial building. Soon after completion, the stepfather of Józef Święcicki, Anton Hoffmann moved and lived there with his family (1897–1900).

In the first version, the facade had a rich stucco decor. A later refurbishing resulted in a complete changes of the front elevation. Noticeable are the heads of dragons above the gate, supporting the central bay window. A renovation was carried out in 2025.

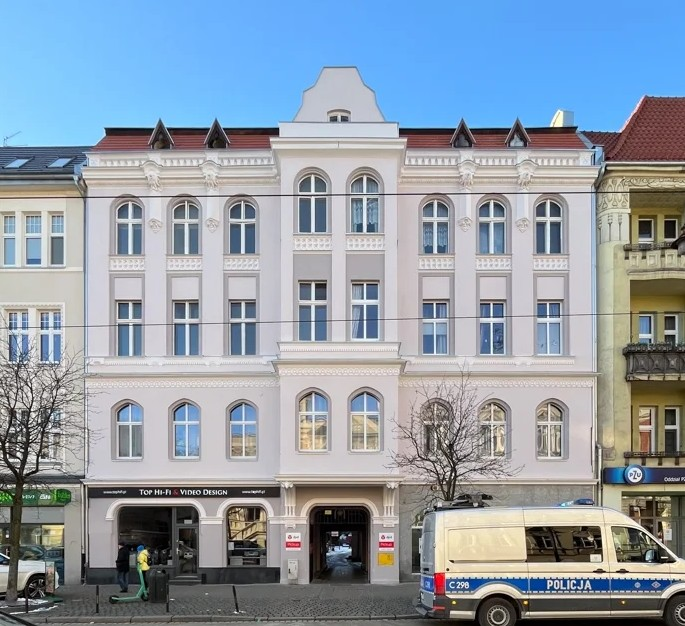
Main facade

=== Tenement at 71 ===
1906–1908, by Rudolf Kern

Modern architecture & Eclecticism

It has been the seat of the Municipal Conservatoire since 1939.

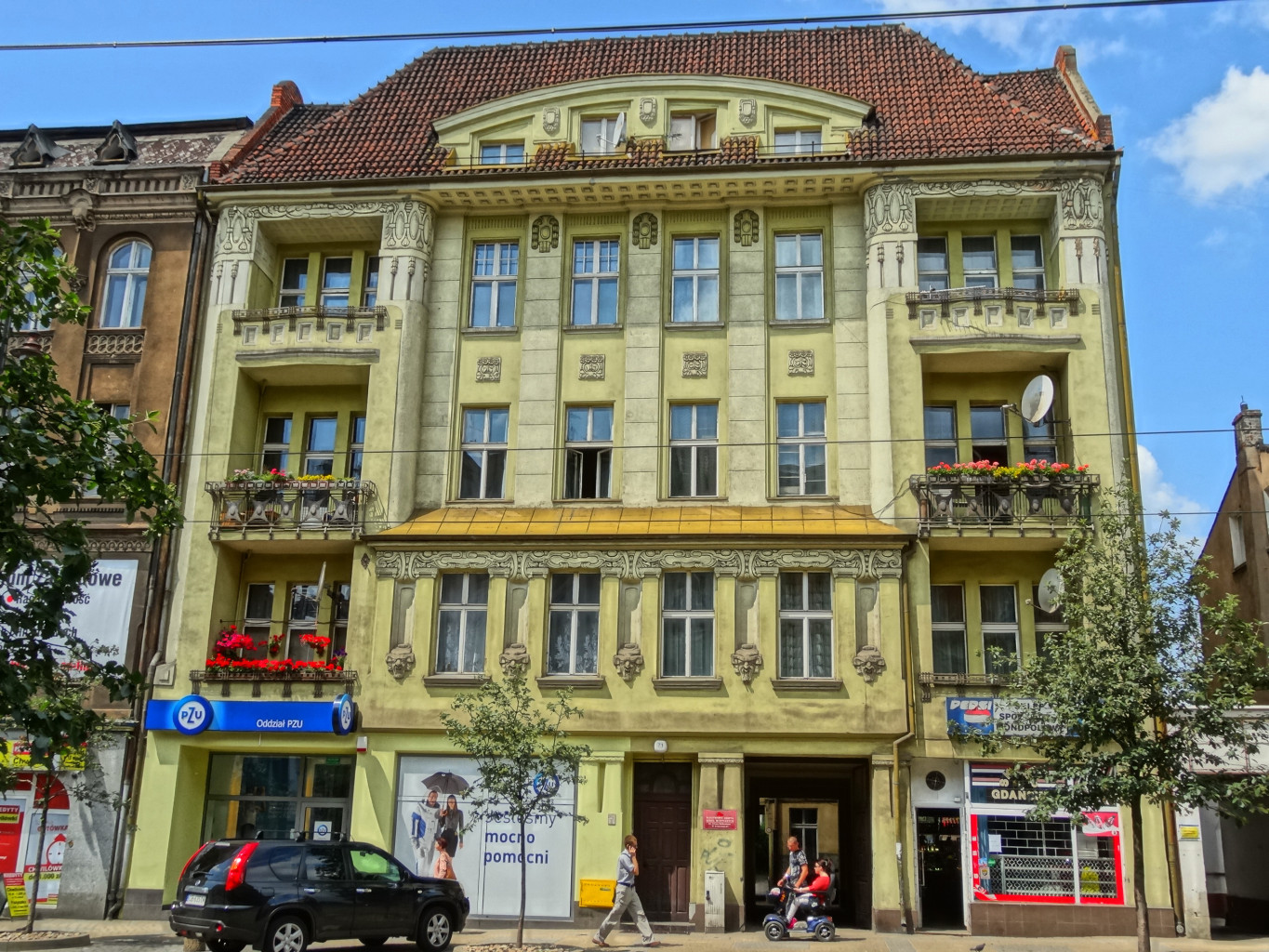
Main elevation

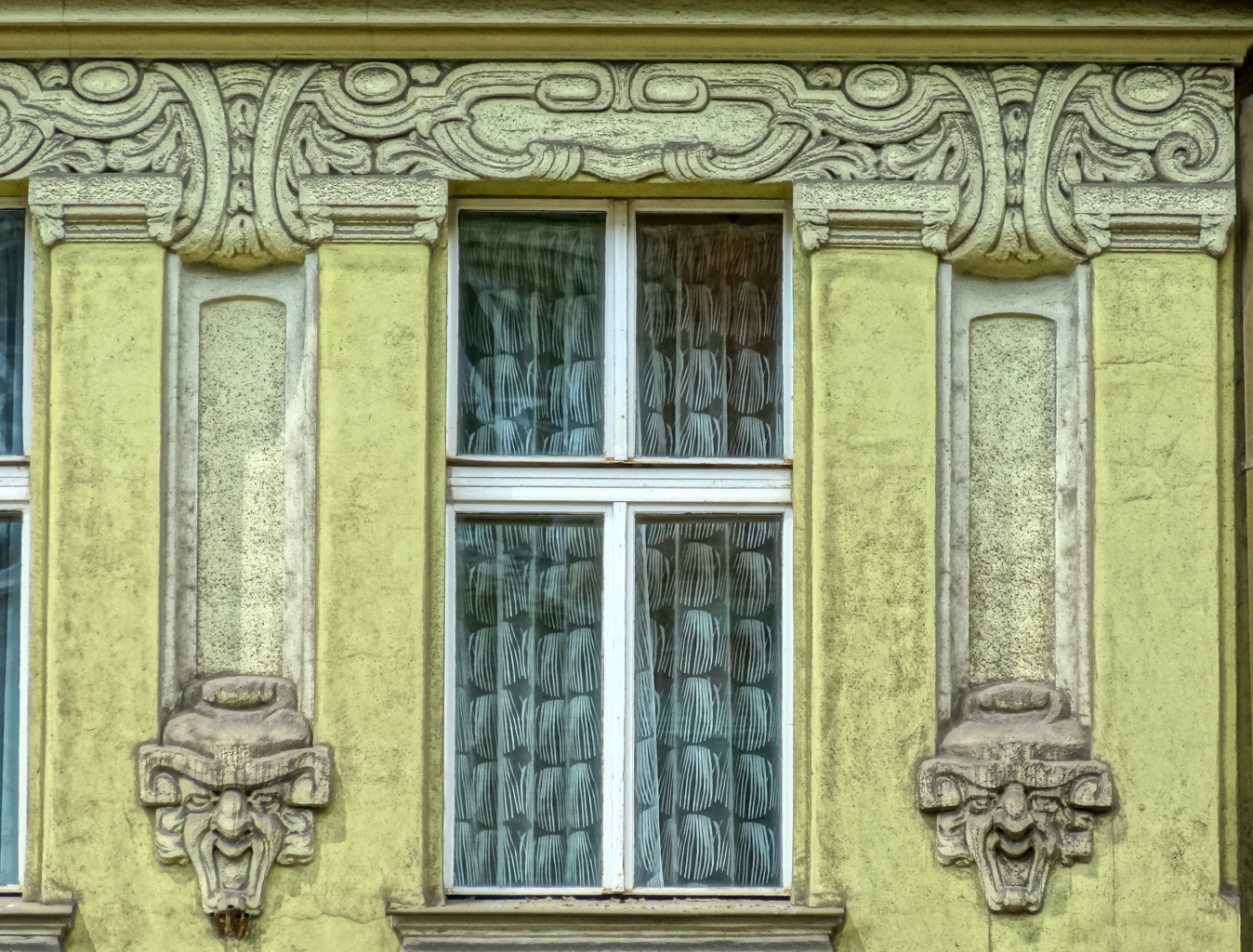
Detail of facade decor

=== Rudolf Kern Building at 1 Adam Mickiewicz Alley ===
Registered on Kuyavian-Pomeranian Voivodeship heritage list, Nr.601377-Reg.A/1086, November 20, 1995.

1903–1904, by Rudolf Kern

Art Nouveau

House of architect Rudolf Kern, for his own use, private and business: he has lived there until 1922.

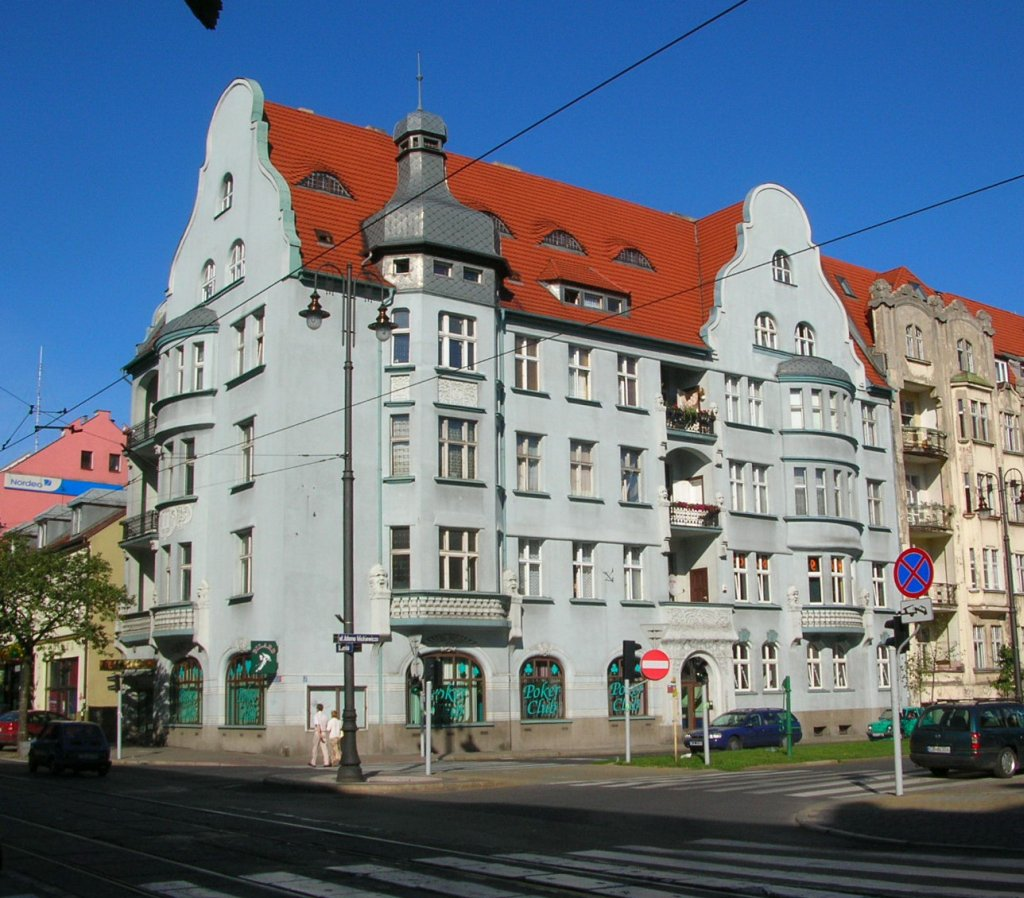
Main facades from Gdańska Street

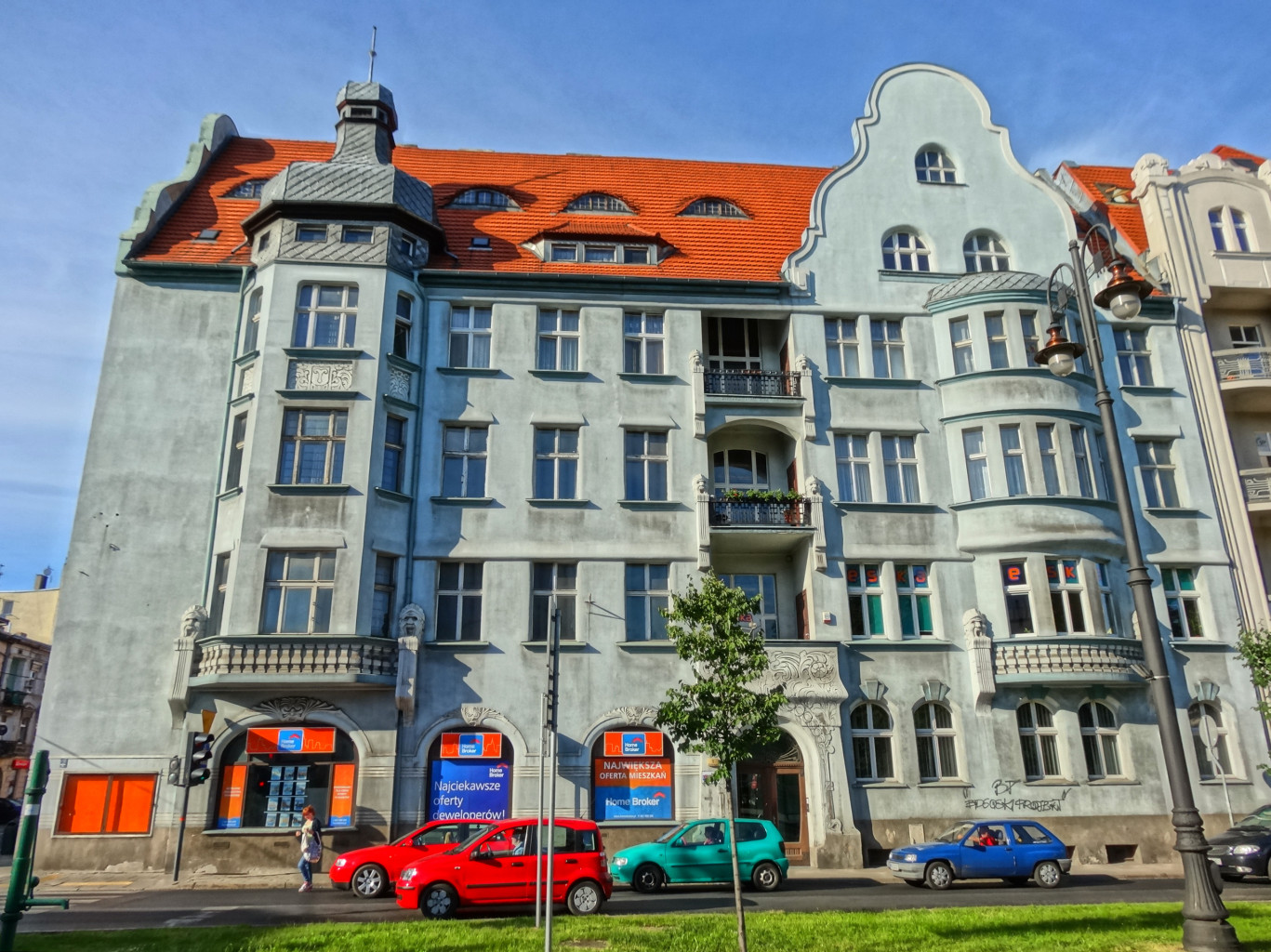
Facade from Adam Mickiewicz Alley

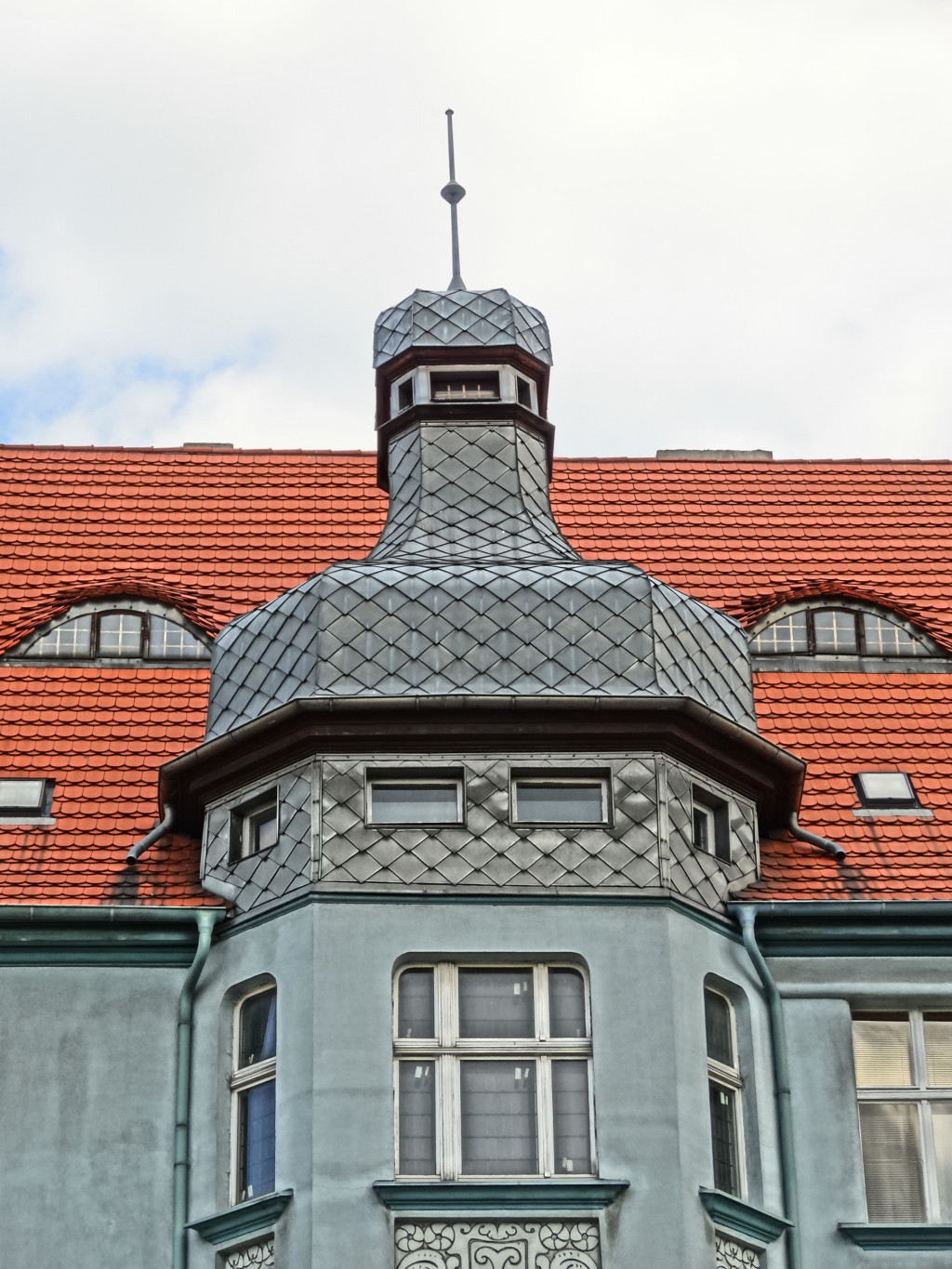
Detail of a bay window

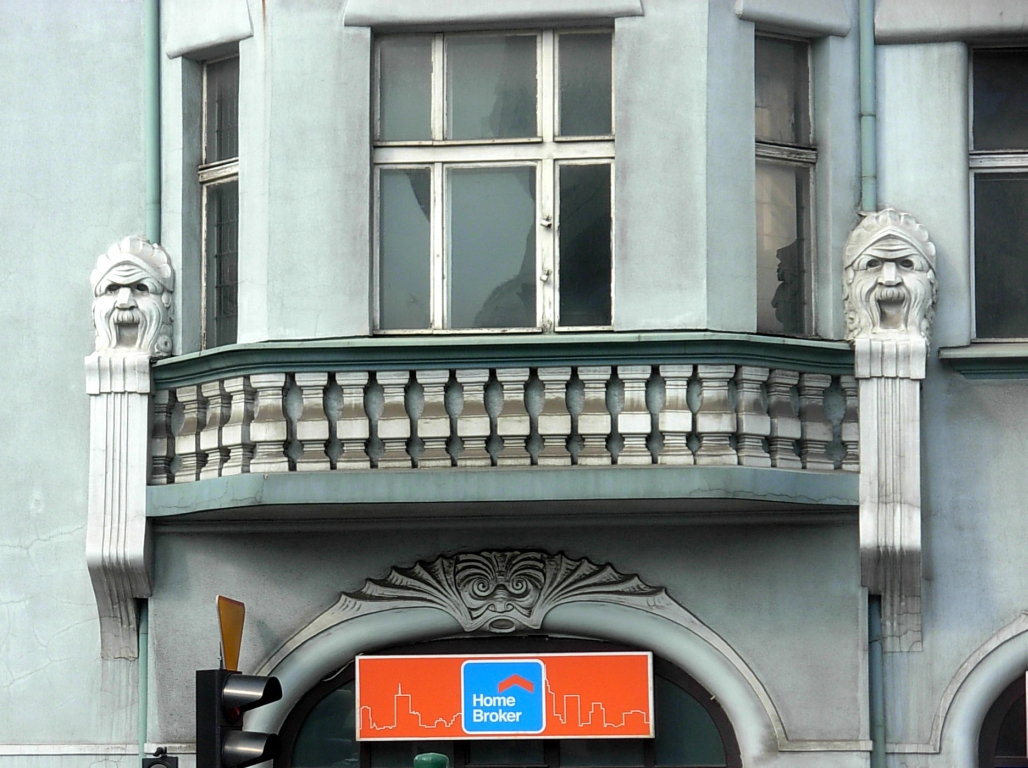
Detail of a balcony
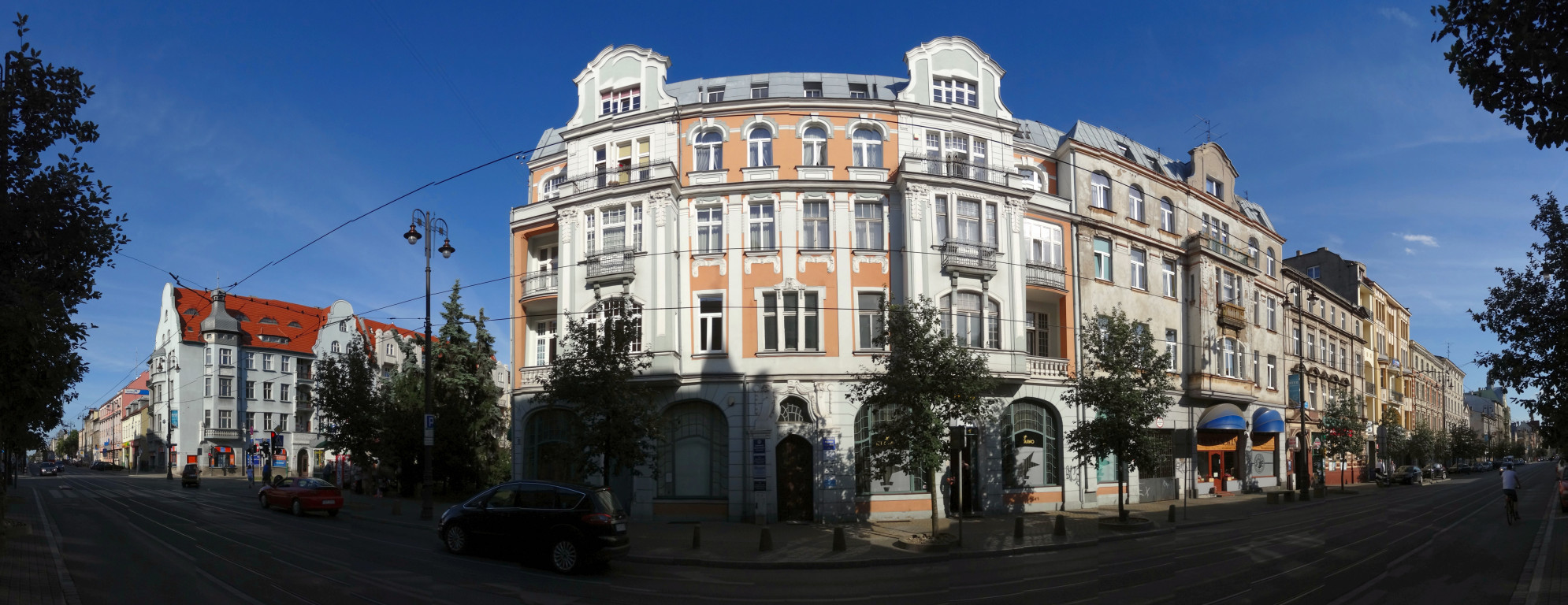
Rudolf Kern Tenement (left), Eduard Schulz Tenement (center), Alfred Schleusener Tenement (far right)

=== House at 74 ===
1883

First registered landlord was Friedrich Wodtke. House features (clear lines, dormers) recall similar ones in Gdańska (e.g. at 37 or 40).

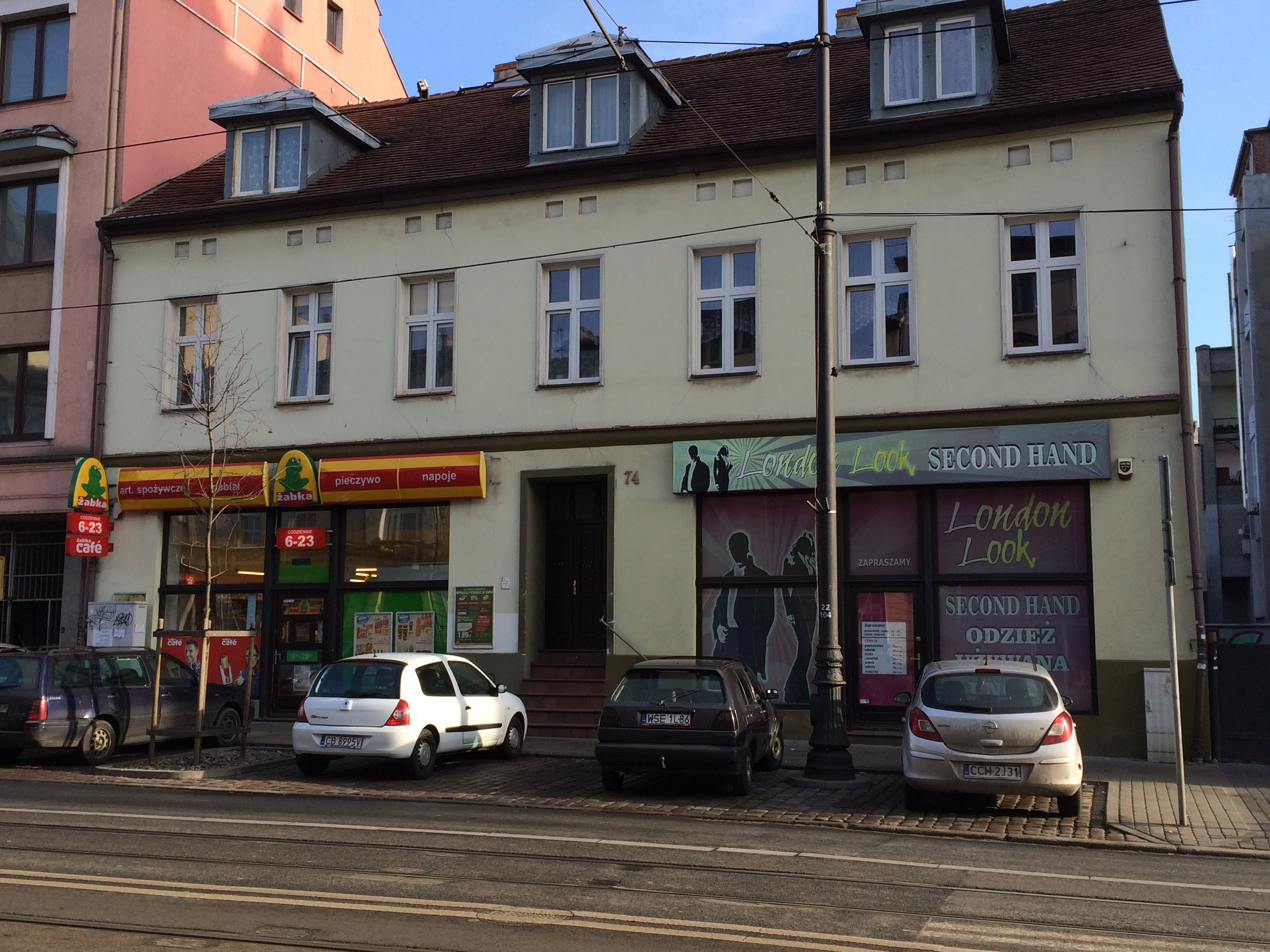
House from the street

=== Tenement at 75 ===
1883

eclecticism & Neo-Classicism Registered on Kuyavian-Pomeranian Voivodeship heritage list, Nr.601310-Reg.A/893, November 12, 1992

A frontispiece adorned with a Hermes's head overhangs the gate.

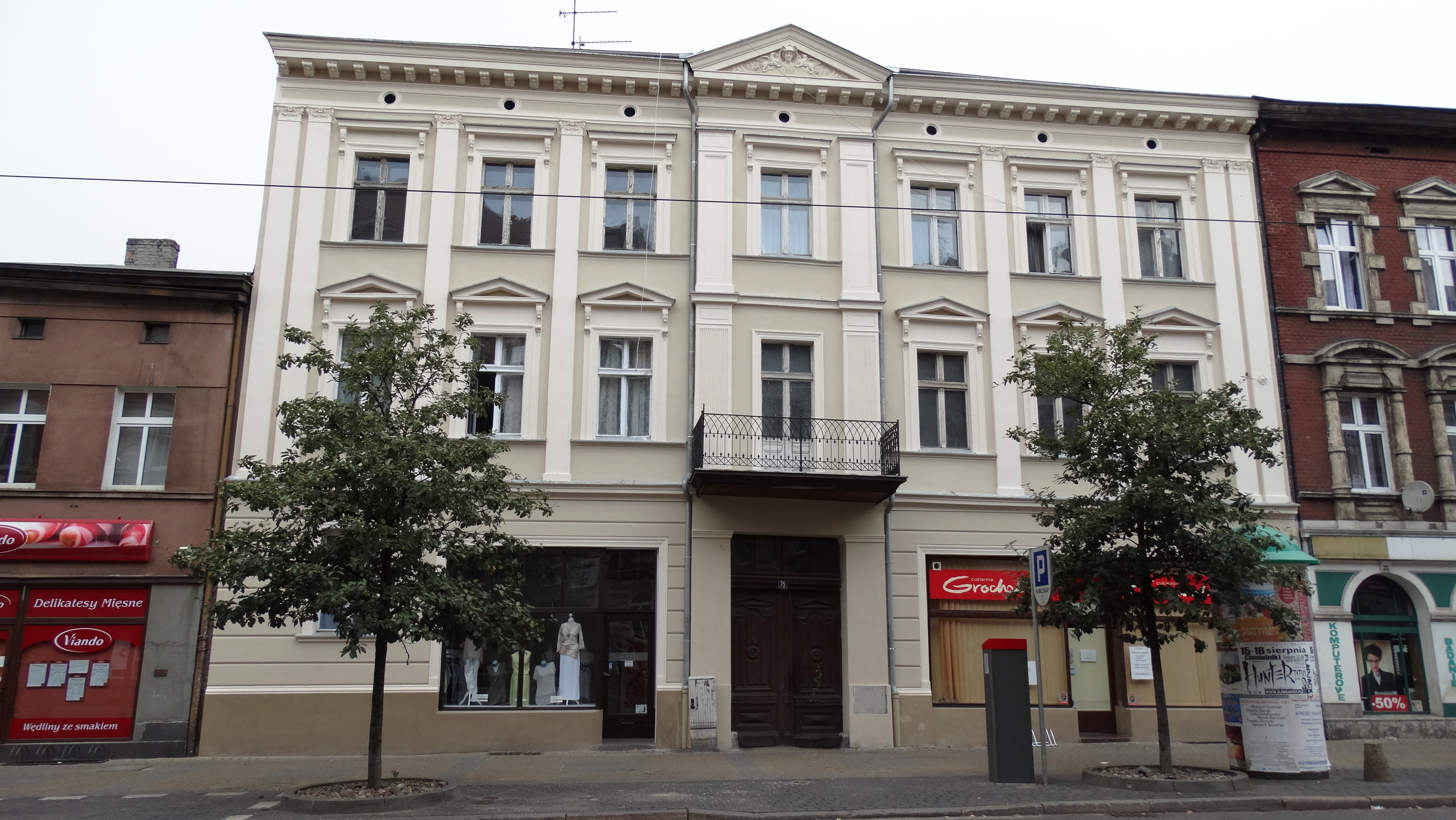
Facade onto Gdańska street

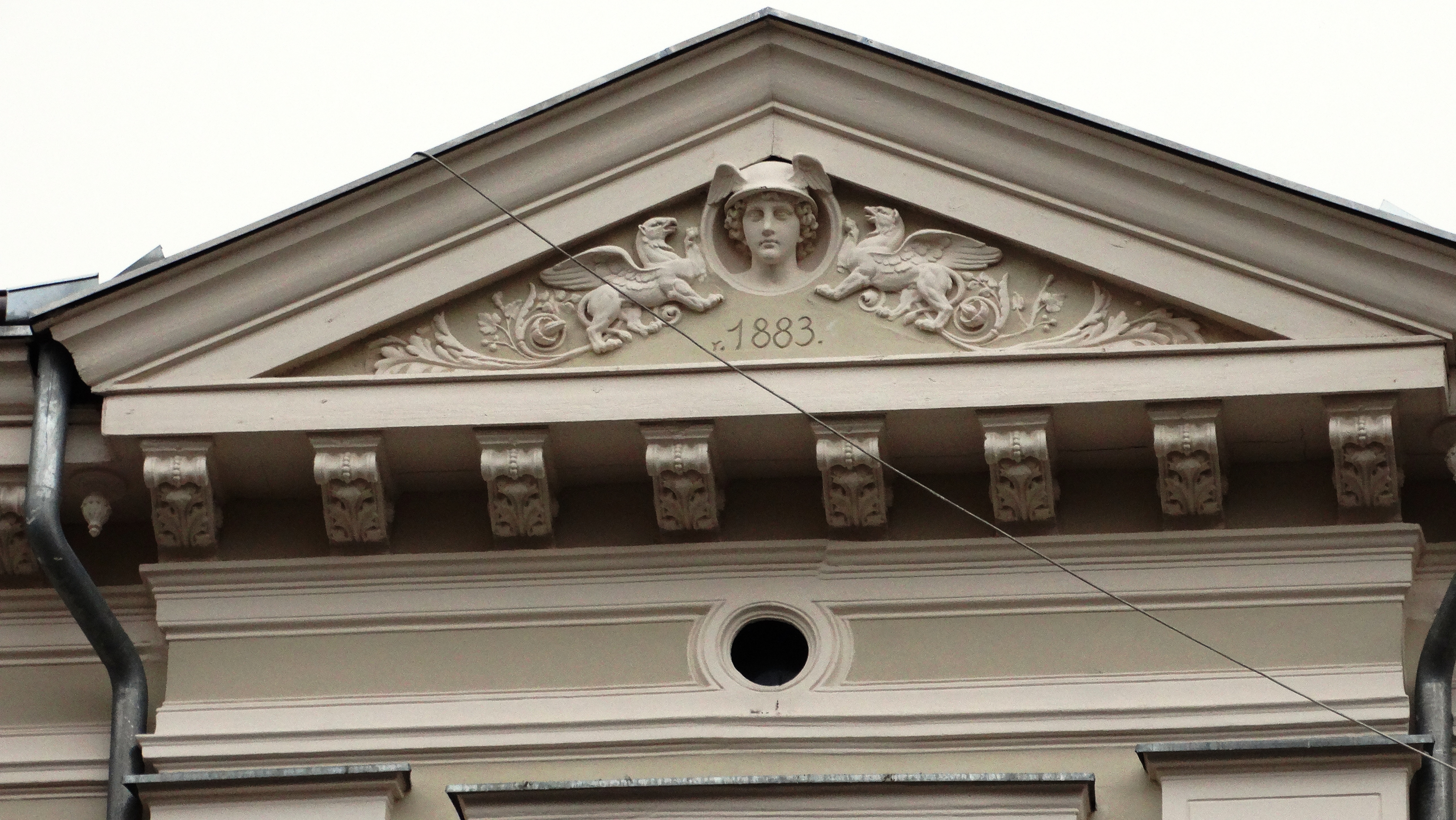
Detail of pediment

=== Tenement at 77 ===
1885.

Eclecticism & Neoclassical Architecture.

The tenement at then Danzigerstraße 45, was commissioned by a merchant, Karl "The young" Wolter, dealing with building material. The eclectic facade displays interesting details: a bossage flanking the avant-corps, columns framing all first floor windows, topped by arched pediments. Bossages are mainly flanking second floor windows. The frontispiece capping the avant-corps is adorned with a male figure (Hermes?).

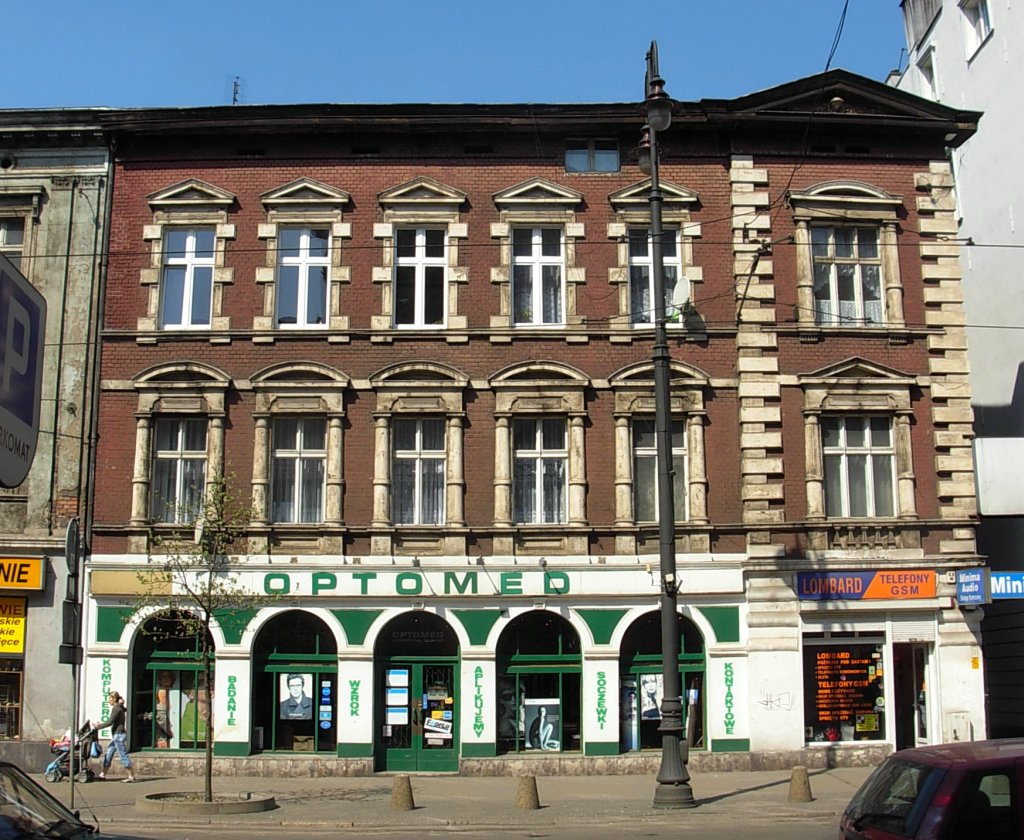
Main facade

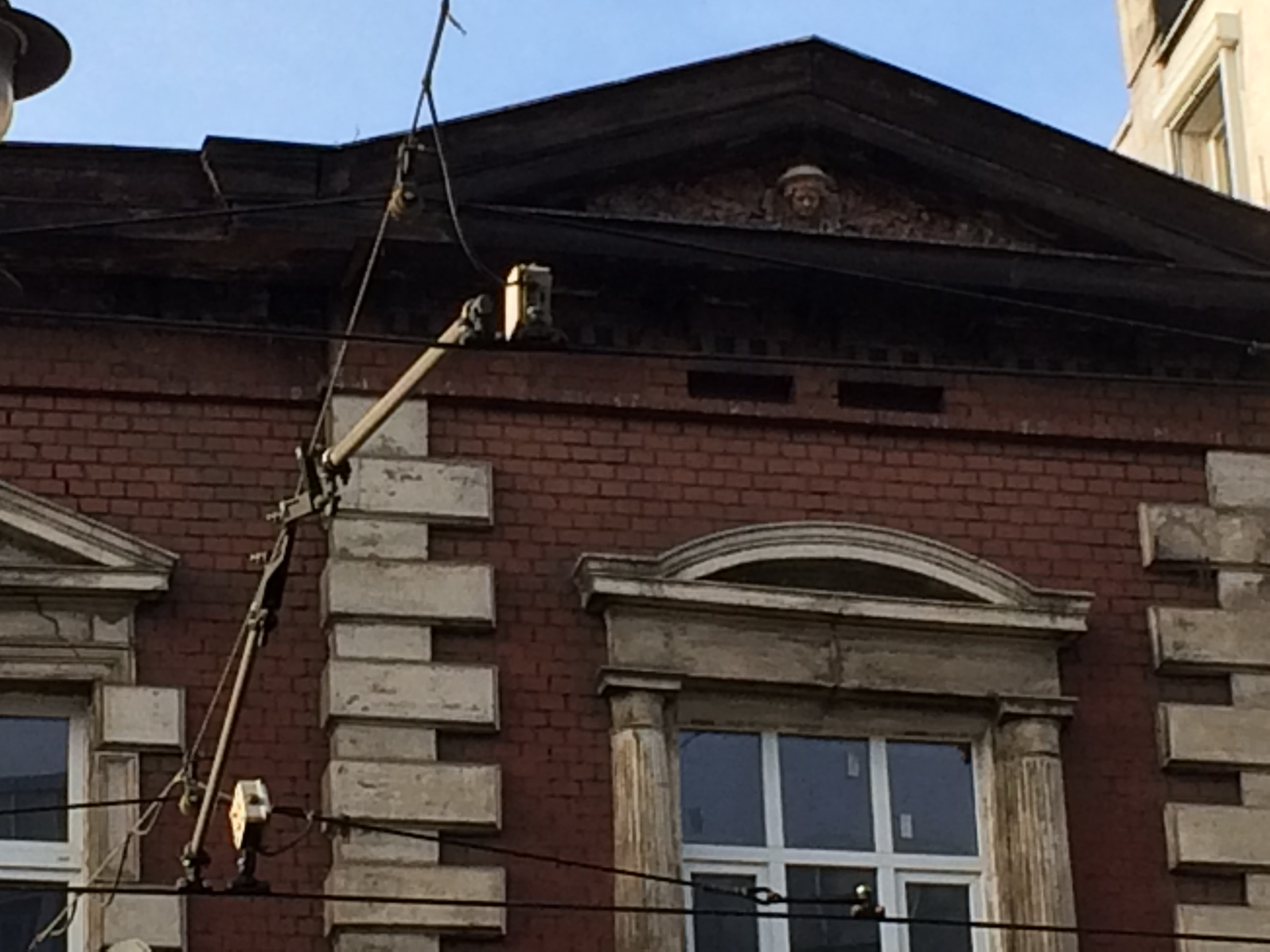
Detail of the frontispiece

=== Ernst Bartsch tenement, at 79 ===
Built in 1898–1899 by Fritz Weidner

Eclecticism, Art Nouveau elements.

The whole facade is purposefully designed on asymmetry, which is a specific means for the architect Fritz Weidner to abandon the stucco decoration and arrangements of architectural elements. After 1945, the building facade has been partly reconstructed, removing the original secession decor.

The edifice shows similarities with House at Gdanska Str.91, also designed by Fritz Weidner.

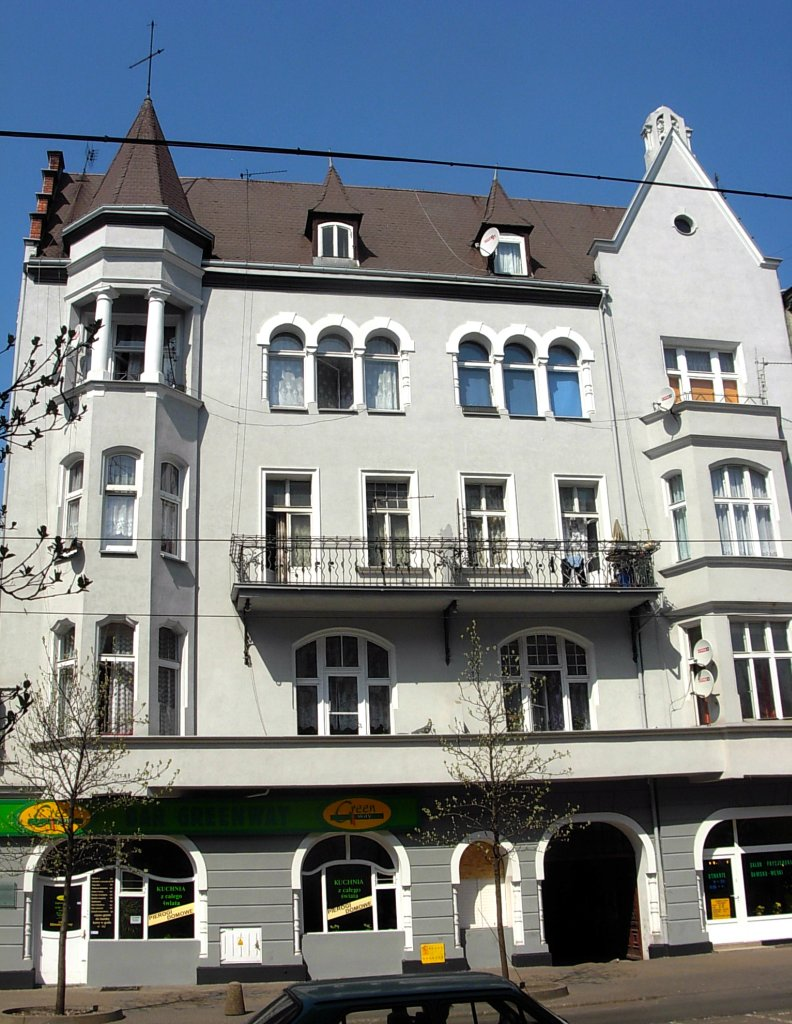
Main frontage

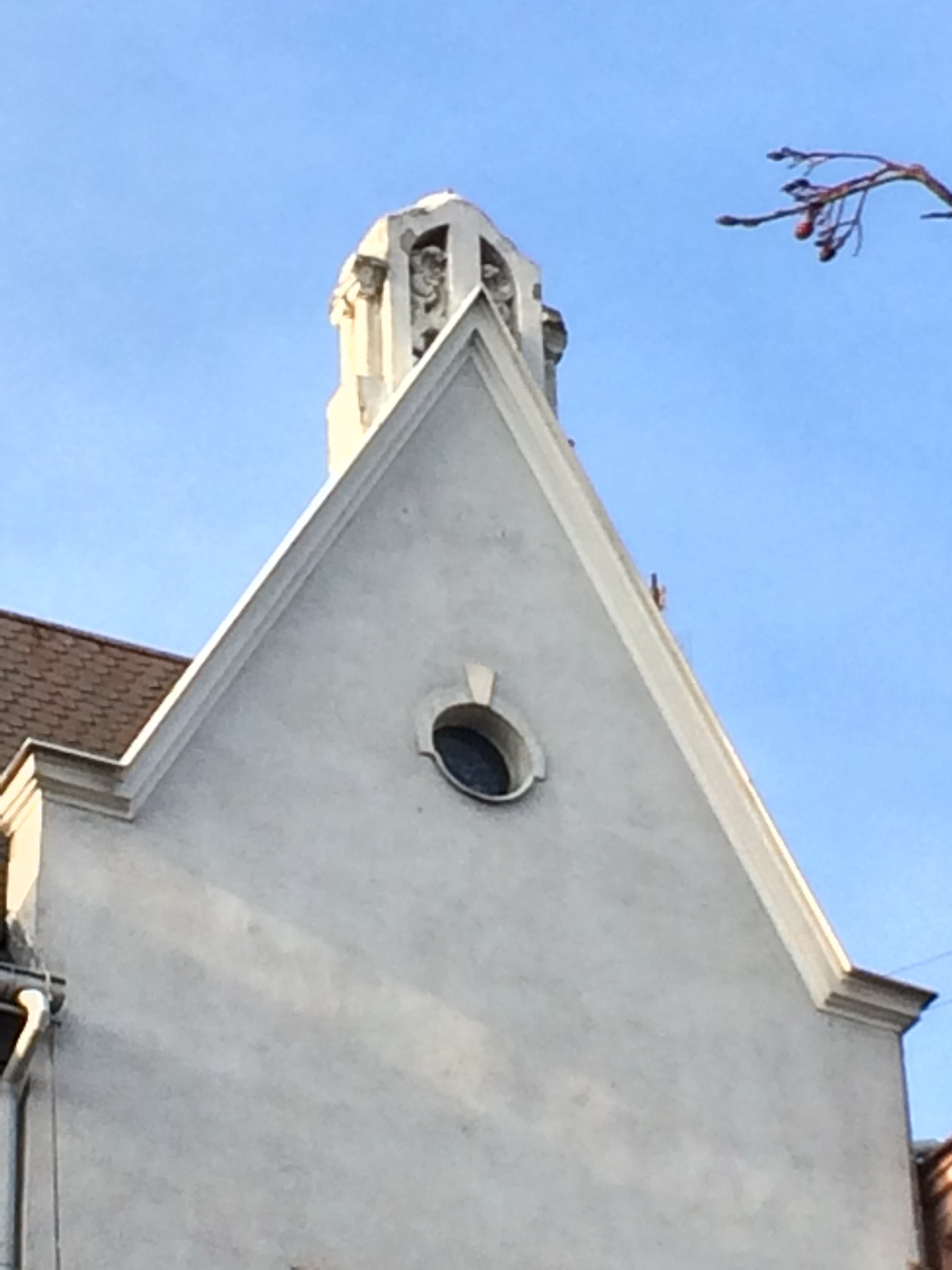
Gable detail

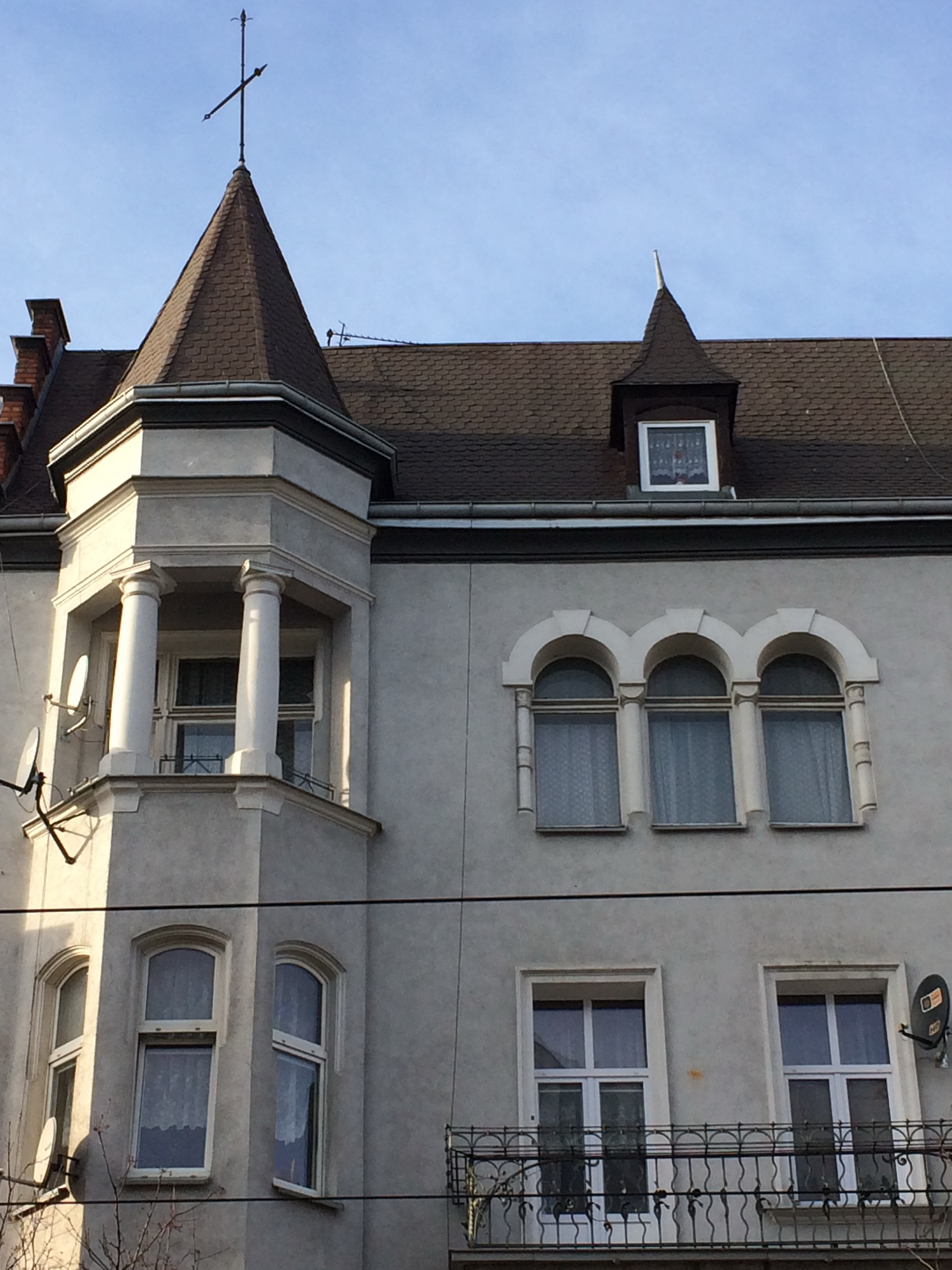
Loggia and bay window

=== Paul Storz Tenement, at 81 ===
Registered on Kuyavian-Pomeranian Voivodeship heritage list: Nr.601311-Reg.A/1056, February 26, 1997.

Built in 1897

Eclecticism-Mannerism.

The building was constructed in 1897, for Paul Storz, a master carpenter. Initial address was Danzigerstraße 47.

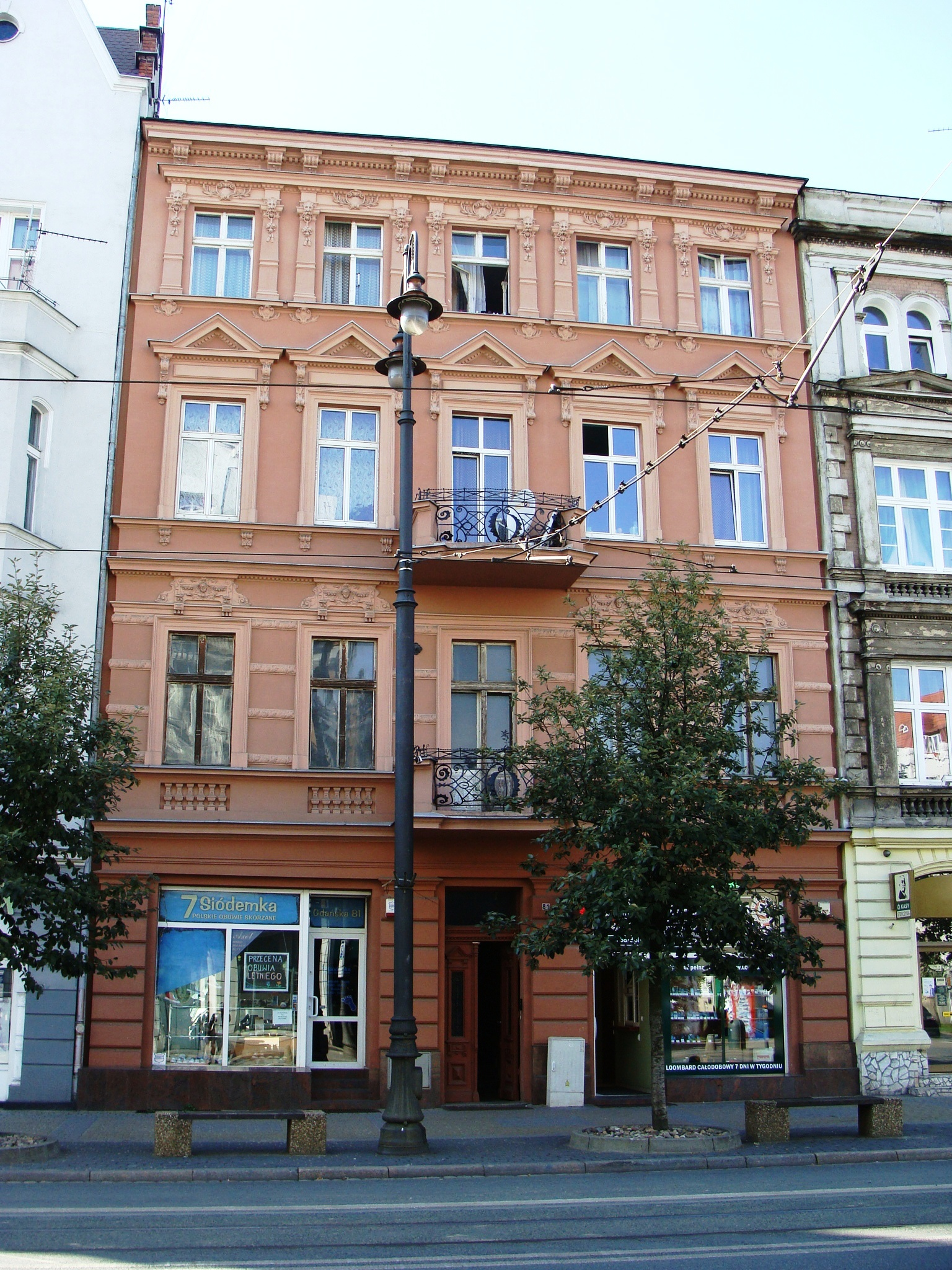
Main frontage

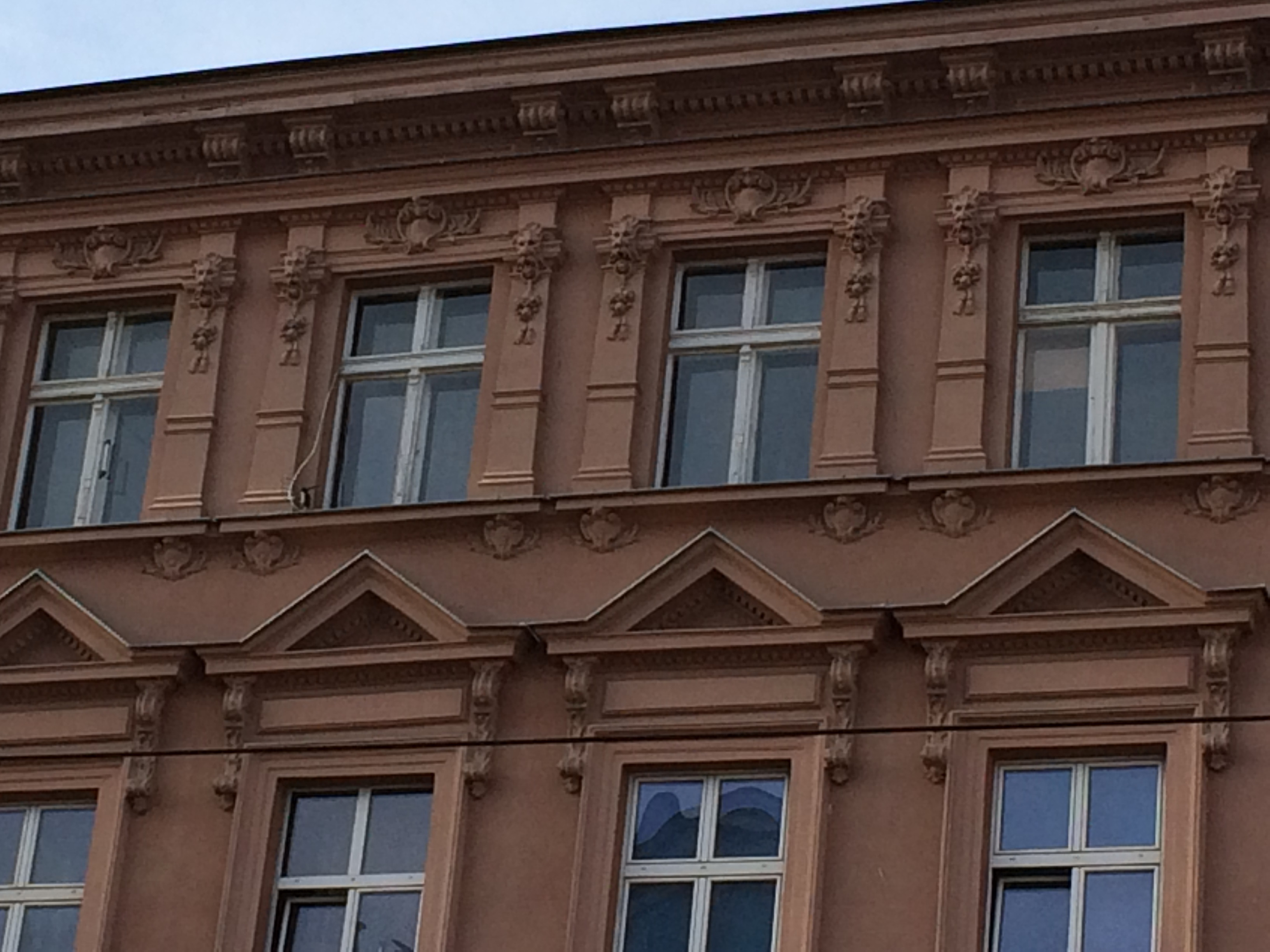
Decoration of the upper floor

=== Tenement at 83, corner with Świętojańska Street ===
Registered on Kuyavian-Pomeranian Voivodeship heritage list, Nr.601311-Reg.A/1056, February 26, 1997.

Built in 1890, by Józef Święcicki

Eclecticism.

The building at then Danzigerstraße 48 had Otto Riedel, a baker, as its first landlord, until World War I.

Typical from Józef Święcicki, the style of both elevations boasts eclecticism, close to Neo-baroque in the richness of the details, among others: cartouches, wrought iron balconies, bossage, bay window capped with an ogee roof and round top corbel table openings.

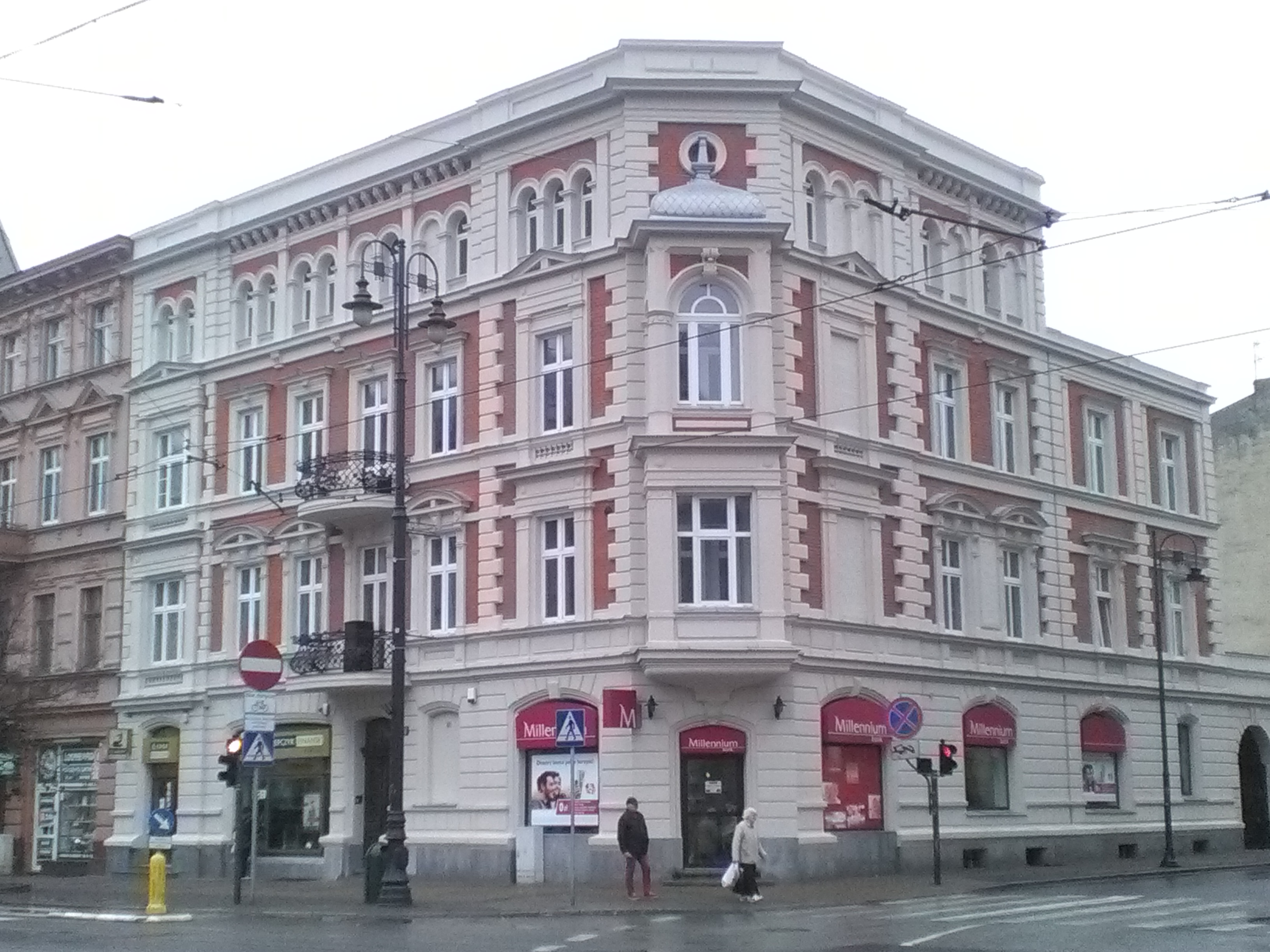
Main frontage

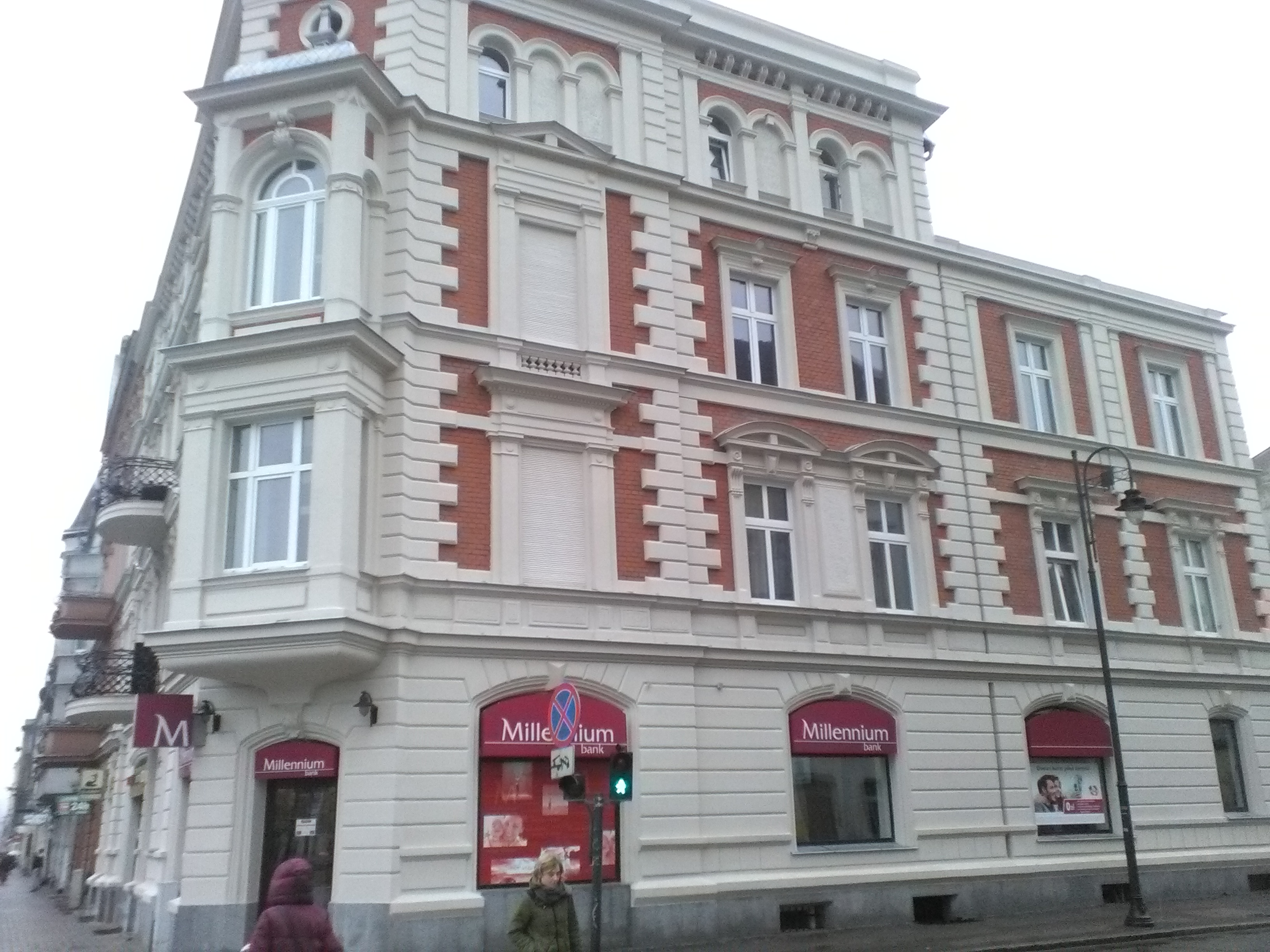
Facade on Świętojańska Street

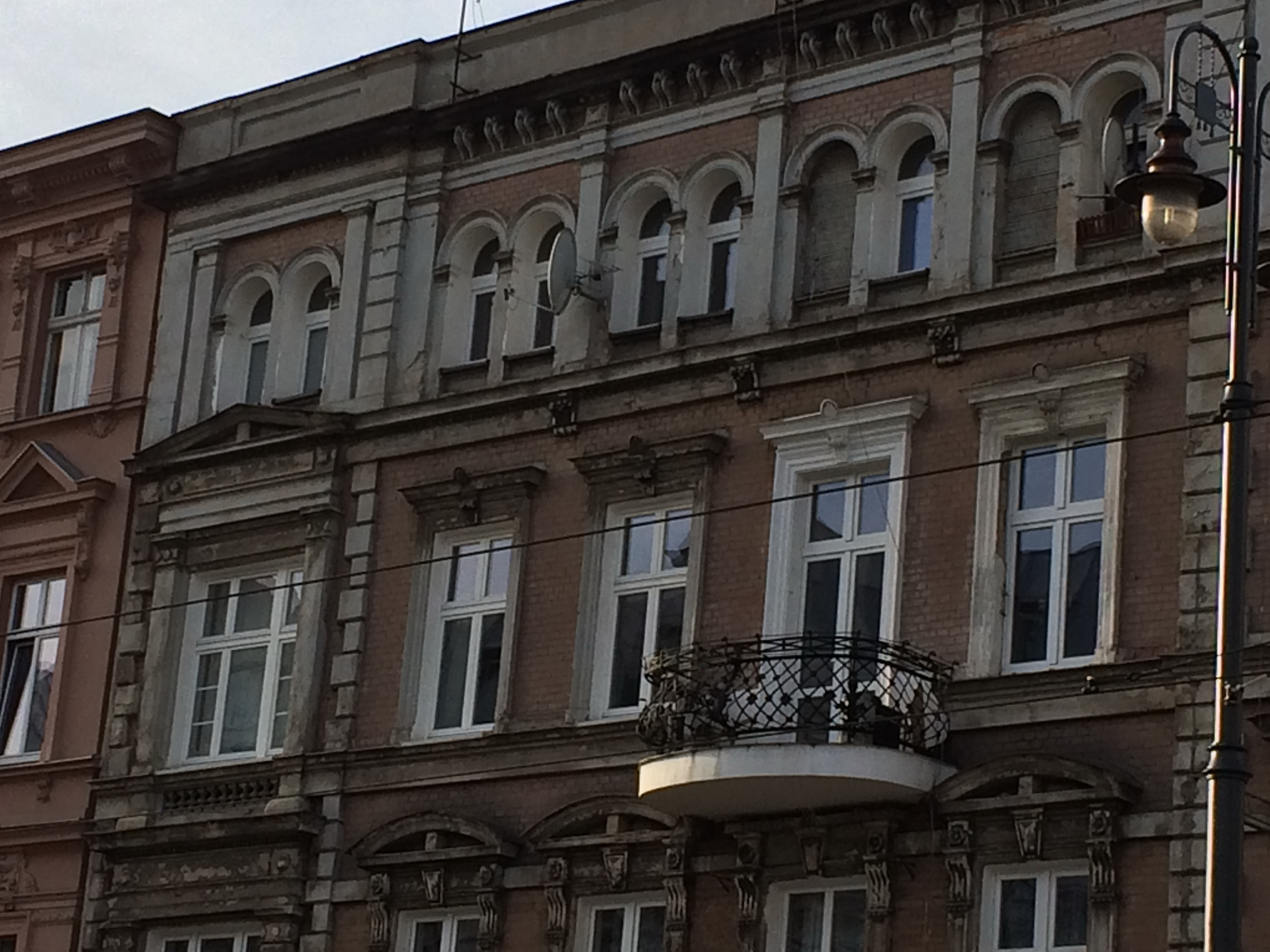
Detail of a balcony

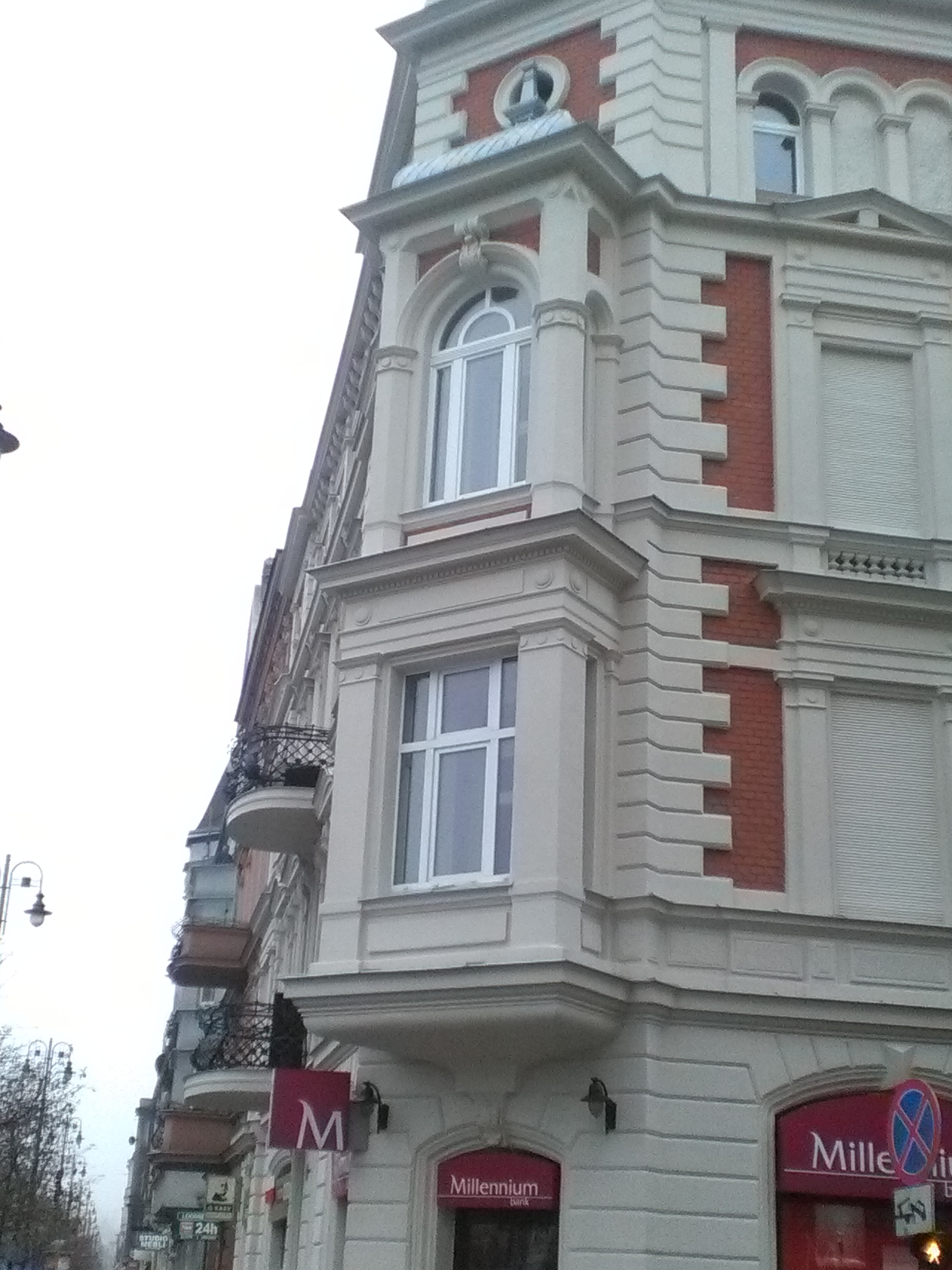
Detail of the bay window

=== Villa Carl Grosse, at 84 ===
Registered on Kuyavian-Pomeranian Voivodeship heritage list, Nr.601311-Reg.A/1056, February 26, 1997

1898–1899, by Karl Bergner

German Historicism

In the 1920s, rumor told mistakenly that the villa belonged to Polish Apolonia Chalupiec.

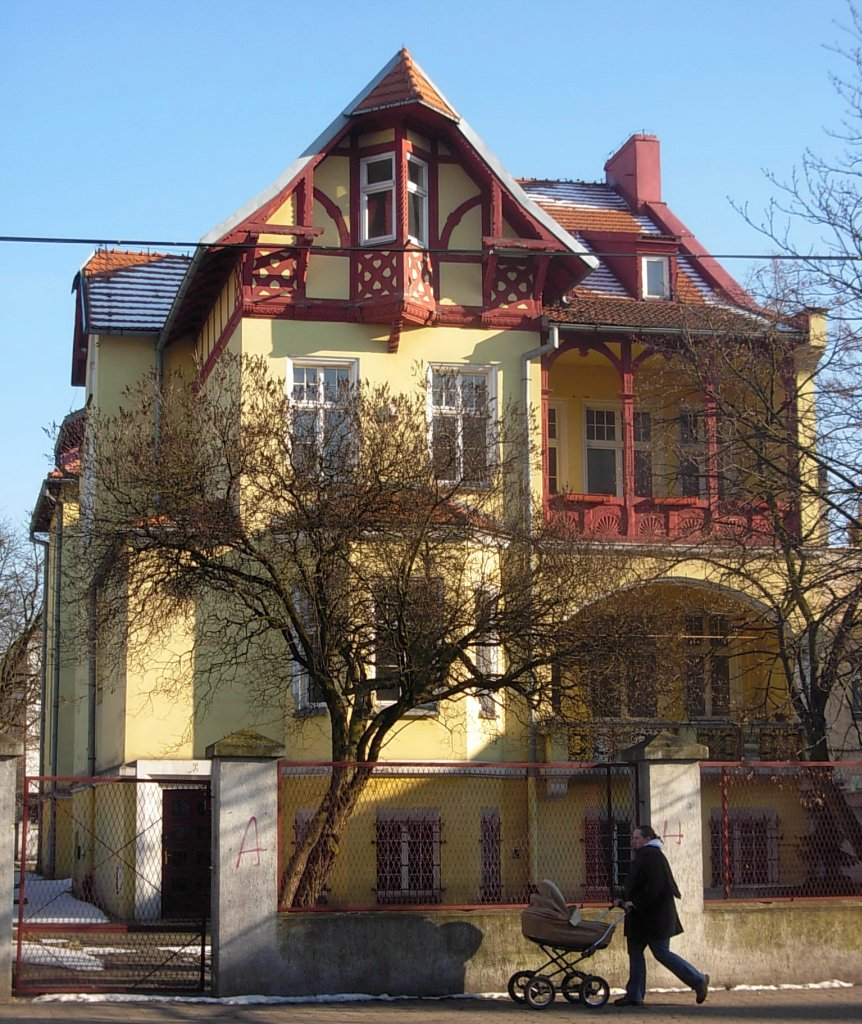
Villa Carl Grosse from Gdańska Street

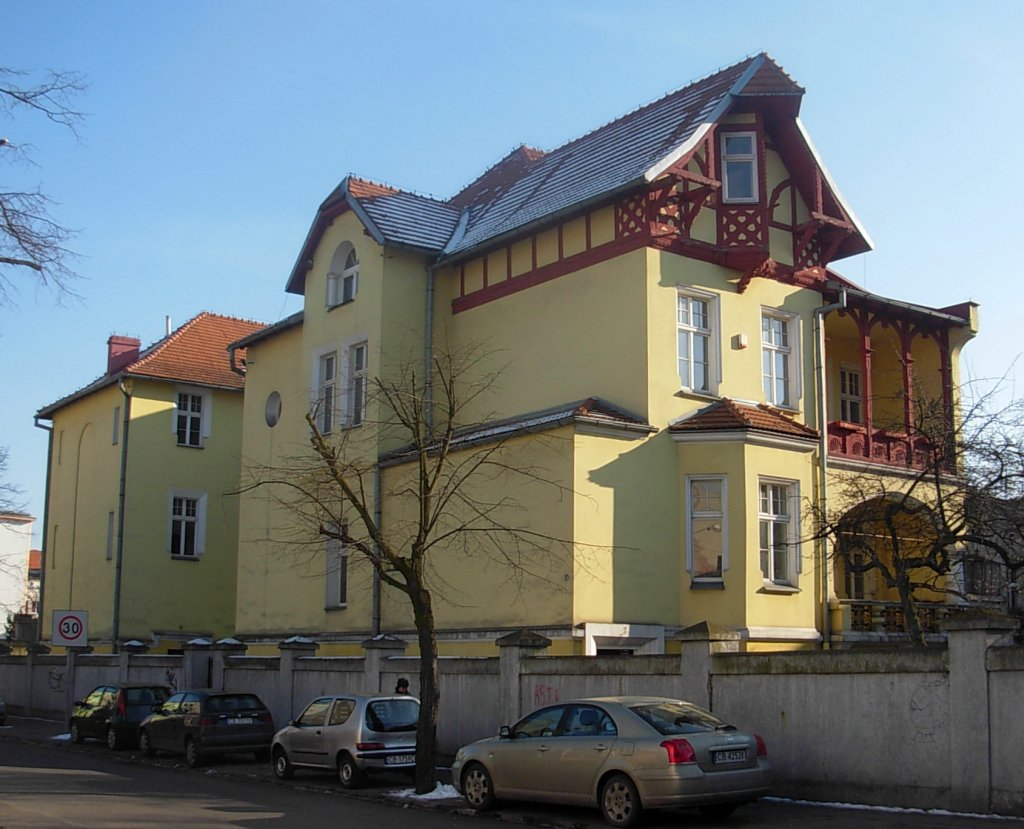
View from Zamoyski street

=== Tenement at 85 ===
1897

Eclecticism, Neoclassicism

Initial address was Danzigerstraße 49, the edifice was owned by Hermann Buchholz, a secretary of the Prussian state railways, living at Johanis Straße 9 (now Swiętojańska Street).

The building has been refurbished in 2016–2017. Architectural details comprise pedimented windows, cartouches with motifs, a slight middle avant-corps and a large portal topped by a transom light.

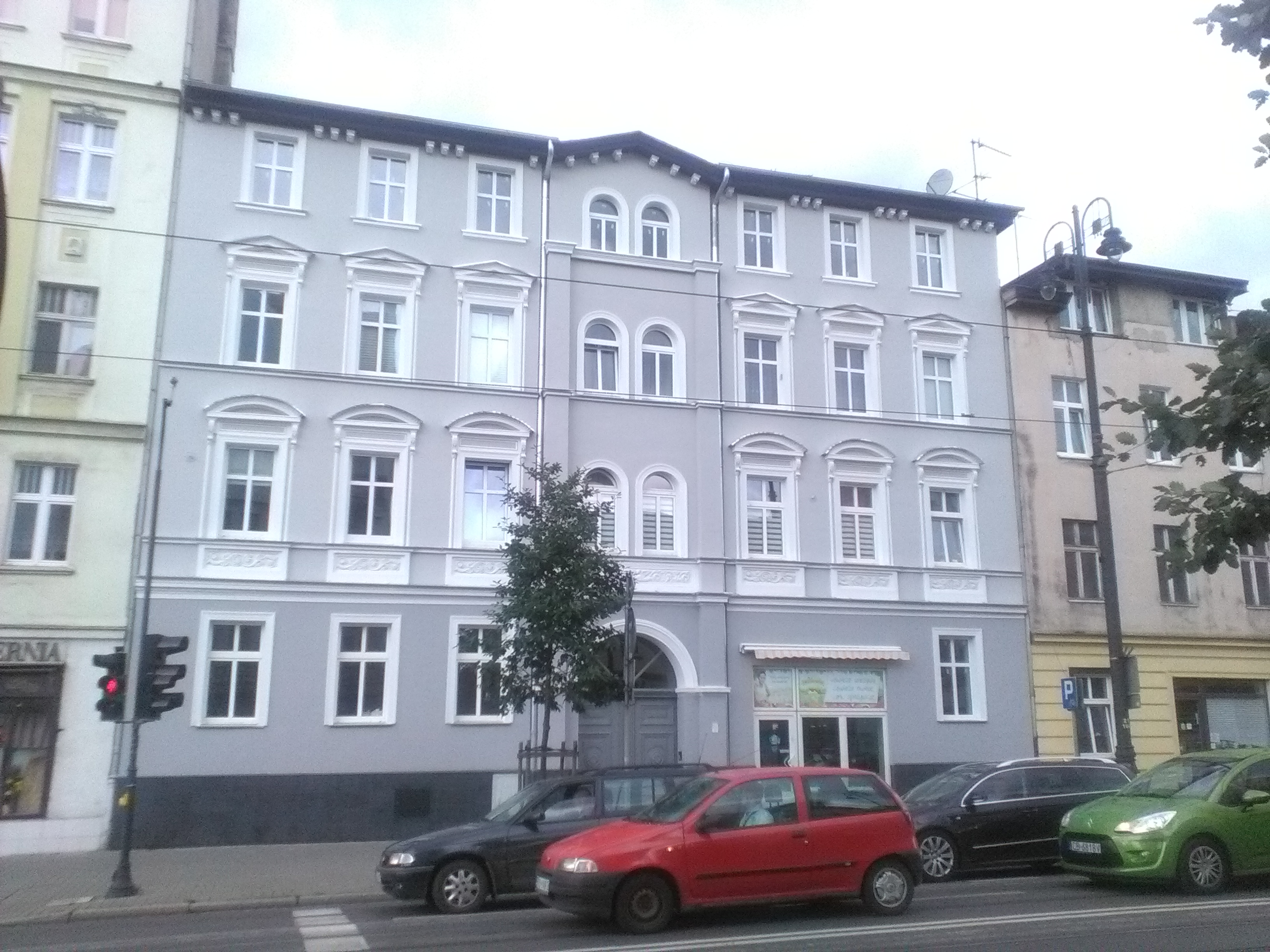
Main frontage

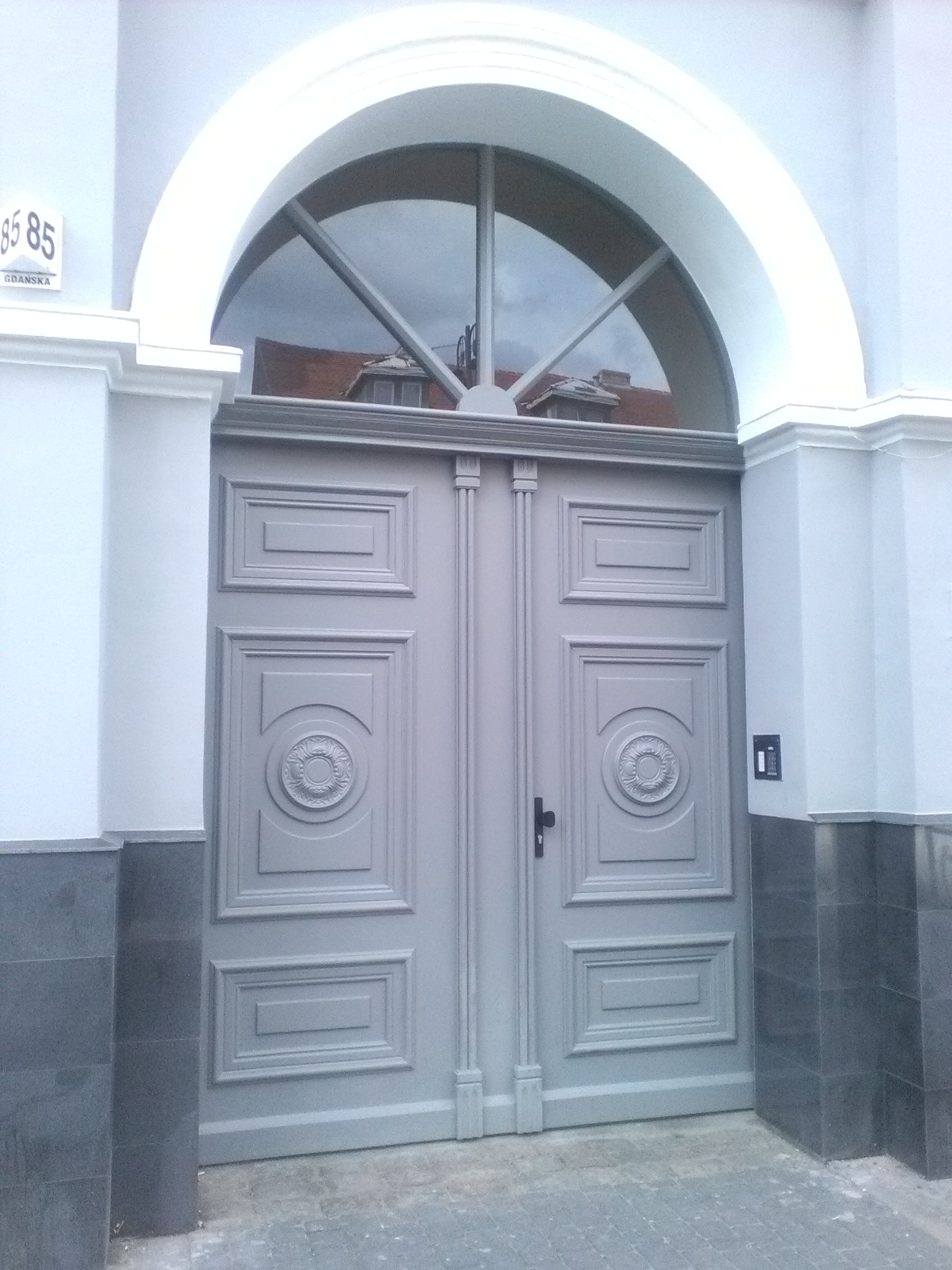
Main portal

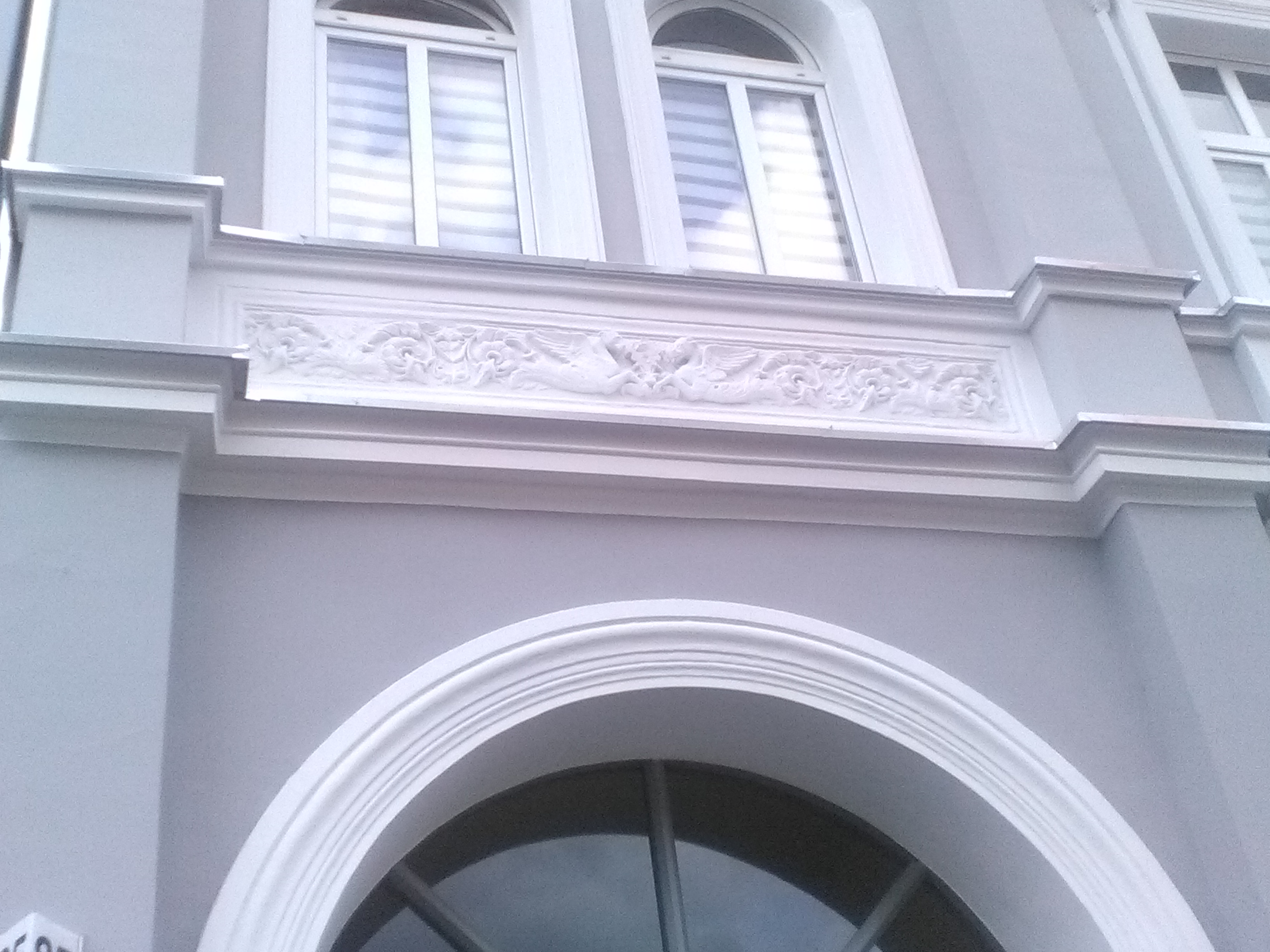
Decoration details

=== Otto Riedl Tenement at 2 Świętojańska Street ===
1911–1912, by Paul Sellner

Modern architecture

In the 1930s, Vincent Bigoński has established here a bakery that operated till 2020.

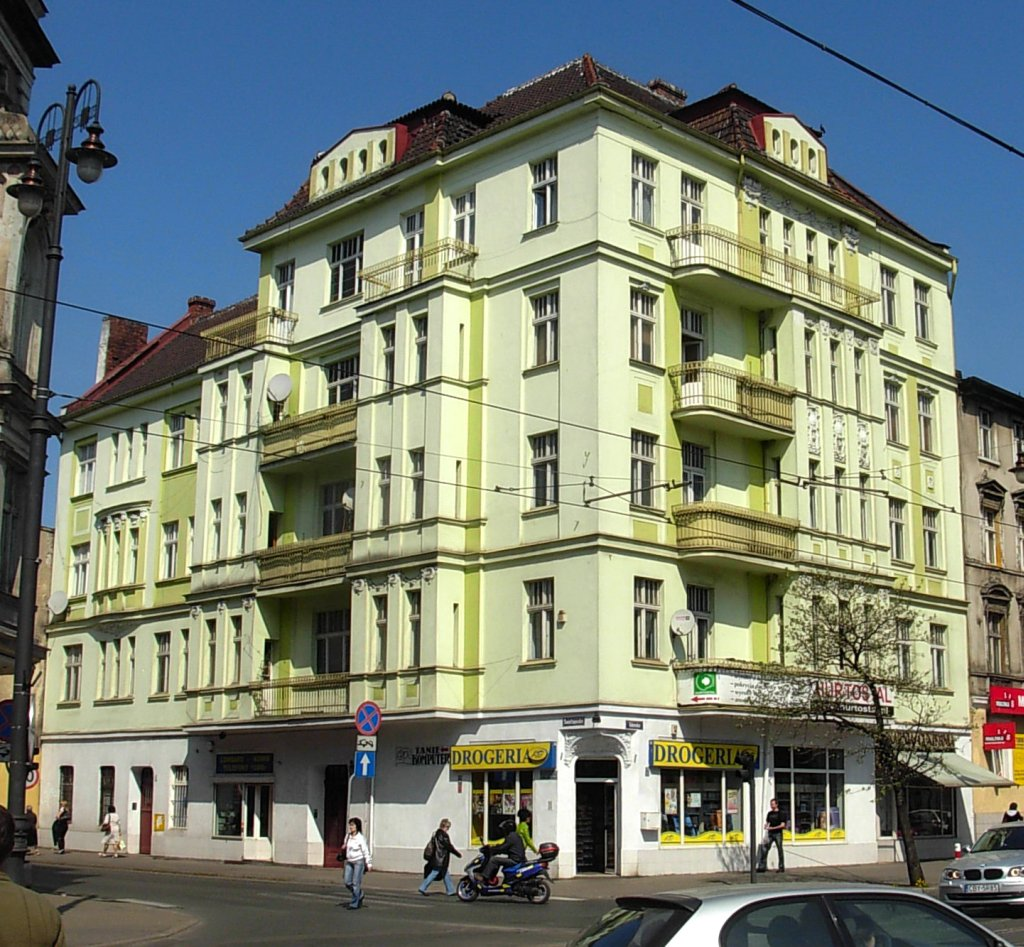
Frontages of Otto Riedl Tenement

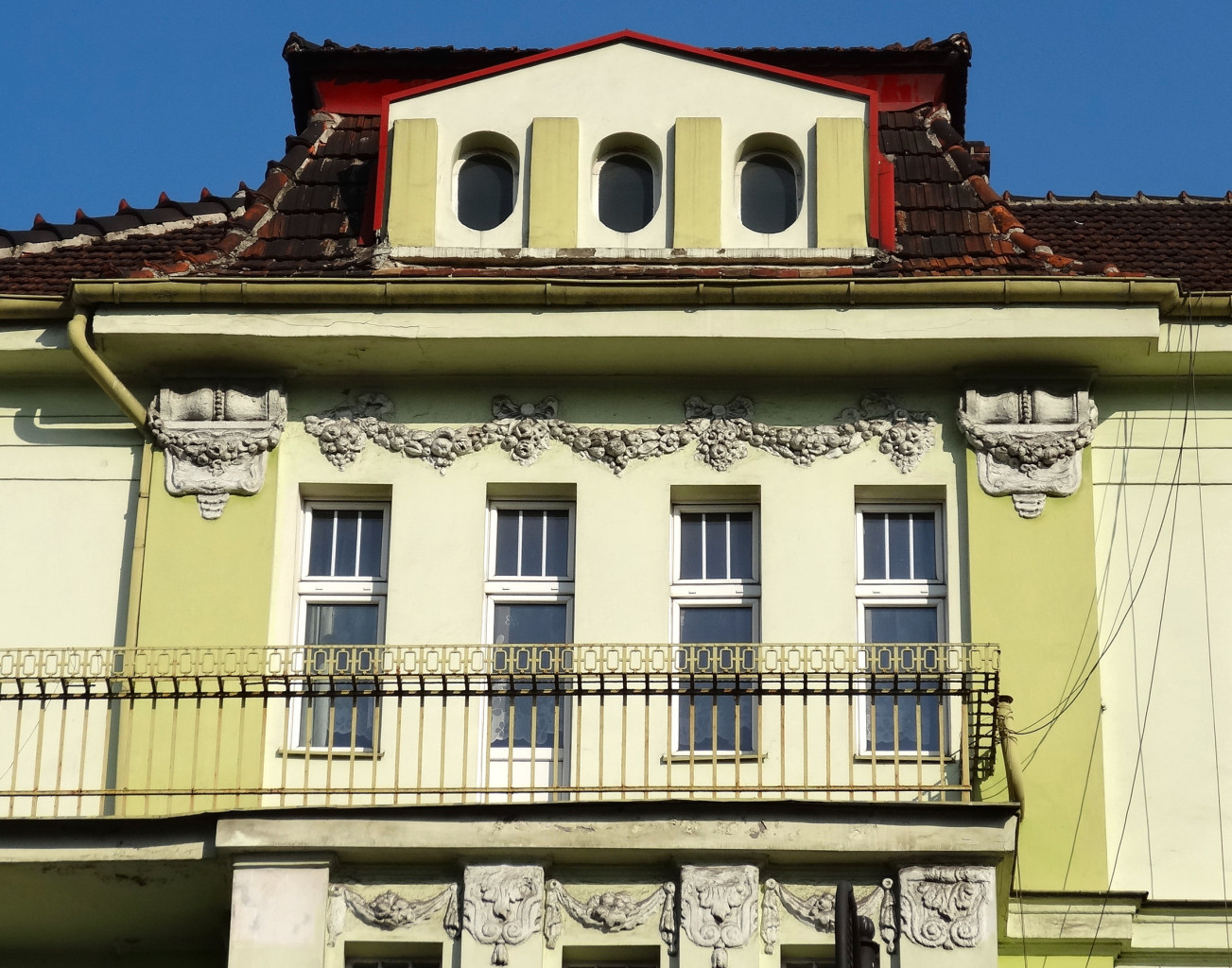
Detail of gable and balcony

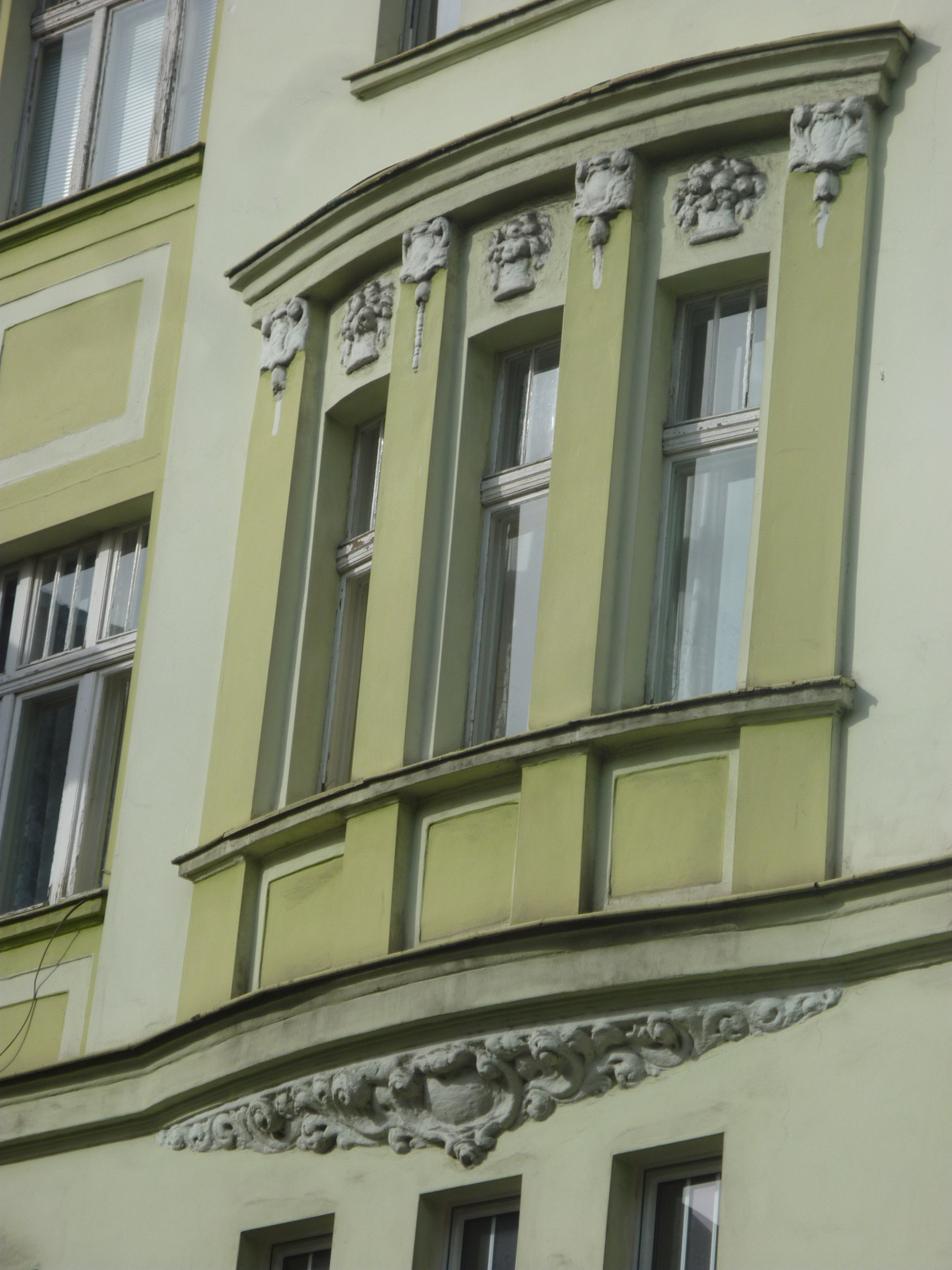
motifs detail

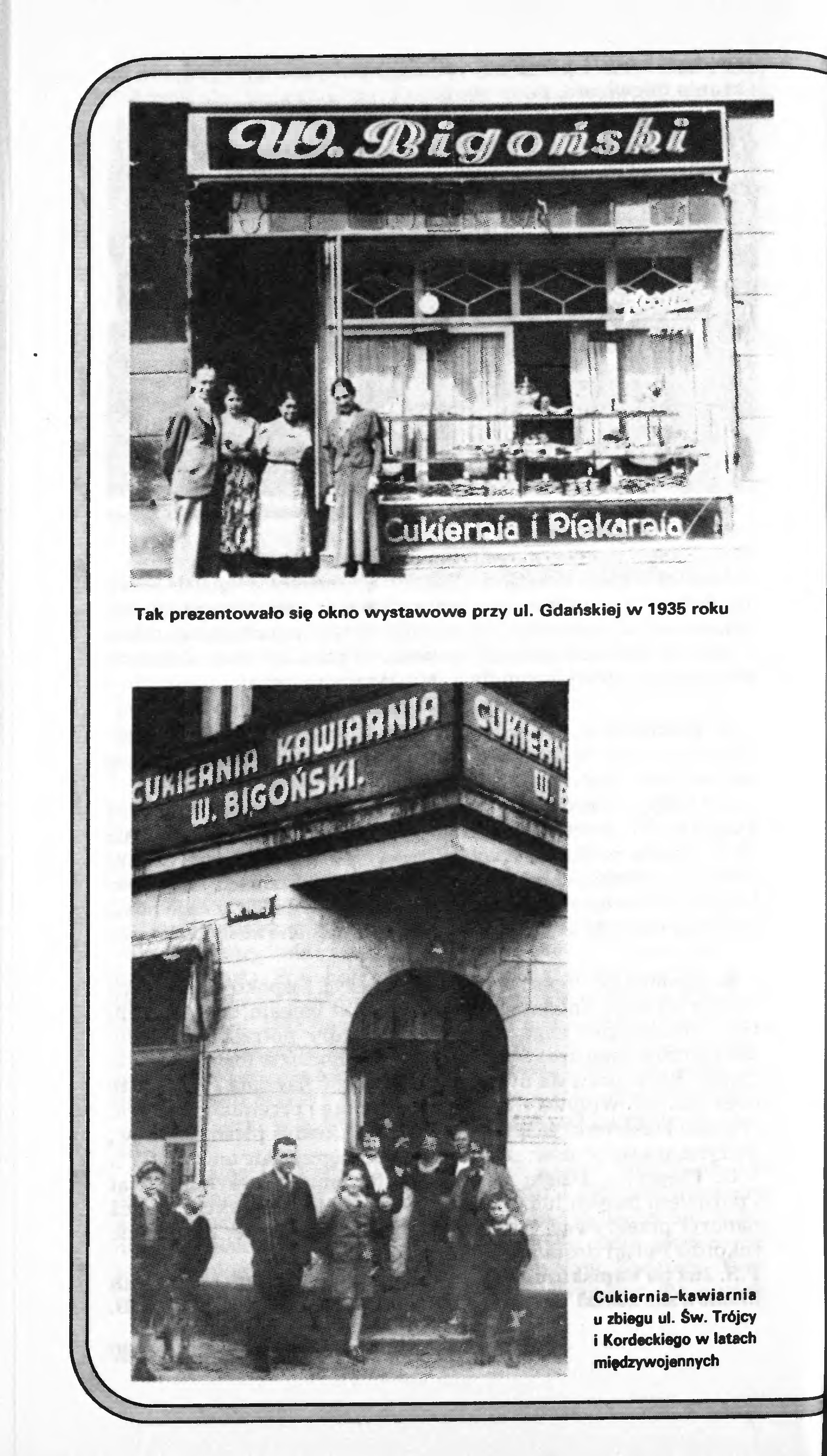
Pictures from 1935

=== Tenement at 86 ===
1887, by Józef Święcicki and Anton Hoffmann

Eclecticism & French Neo-Renaissance

Puttos and sirens stucco reliefs are mounted on the facade.

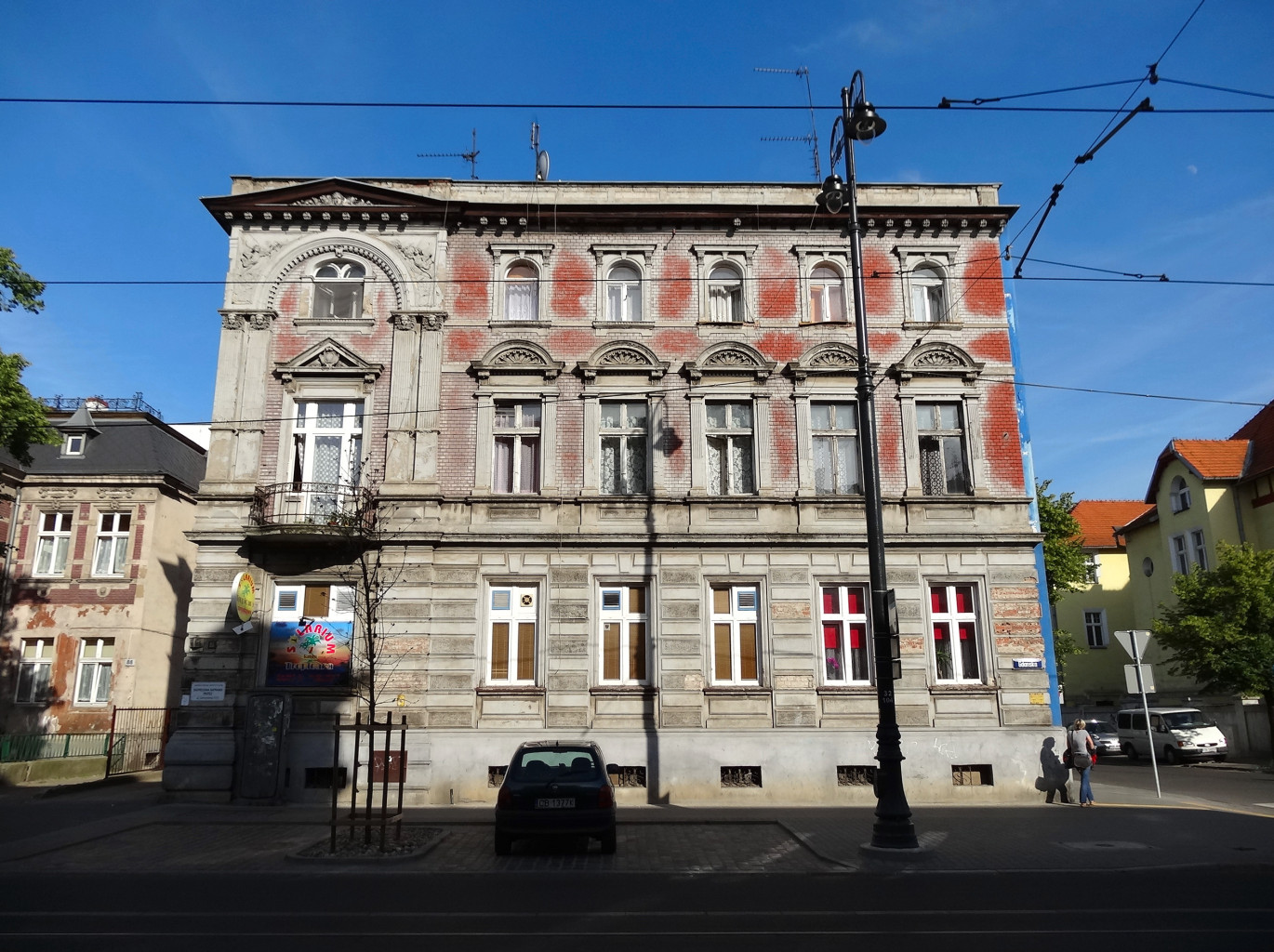
Main facade

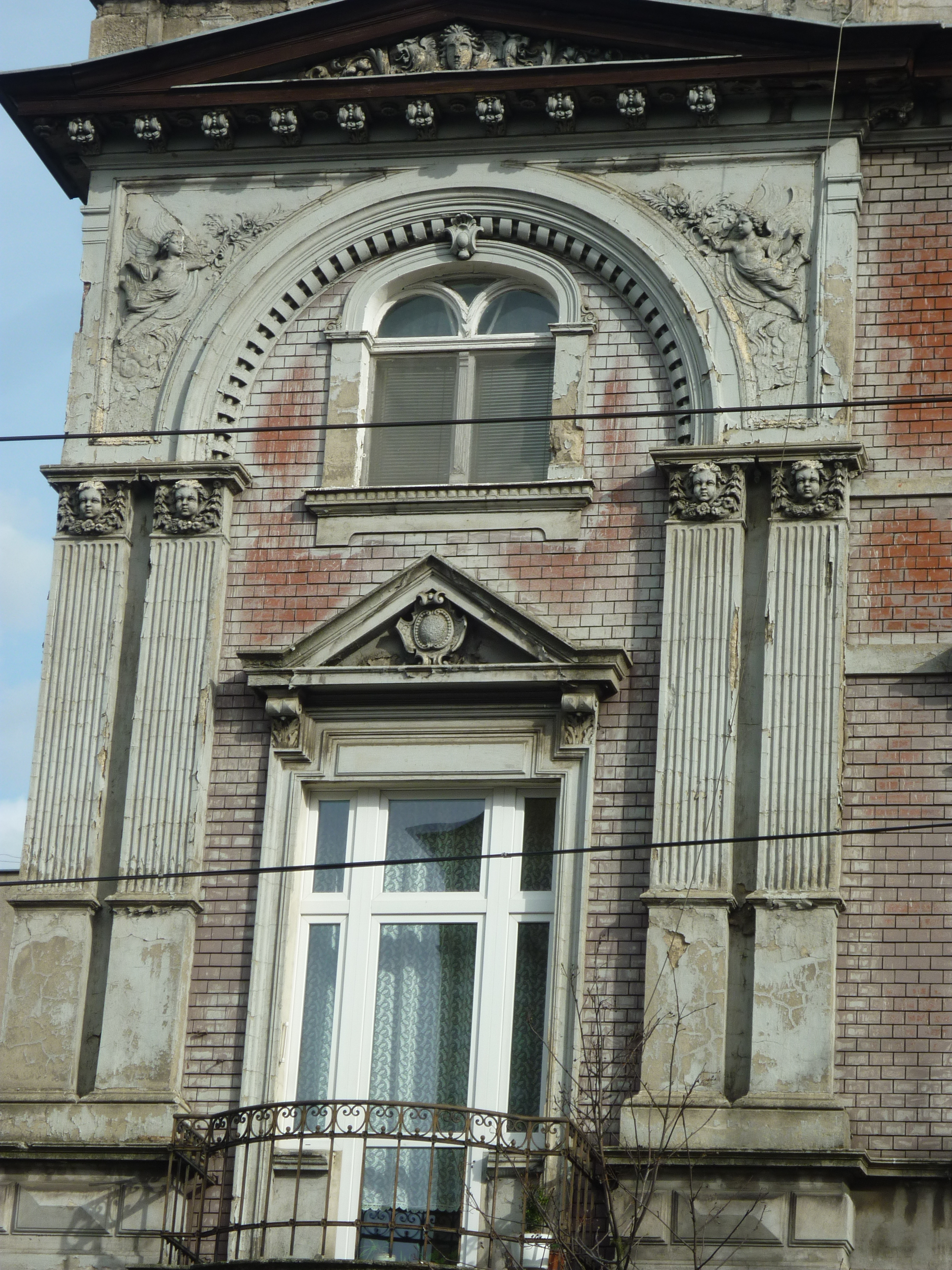
Architectural detail

=== Villa Hugo Hecht, at 88/90 ===
Registered on Kuyavian-Pomeranian Voivodeship heritage list, Nr.601315-Reg.A/137, March 19, 2004

1888–1889, by Józef Święcicki and Anton Hoffmann

French Neo-Renaissance

In 1900–1939, the owner was Hermann Dietz, activist and social worker physician.

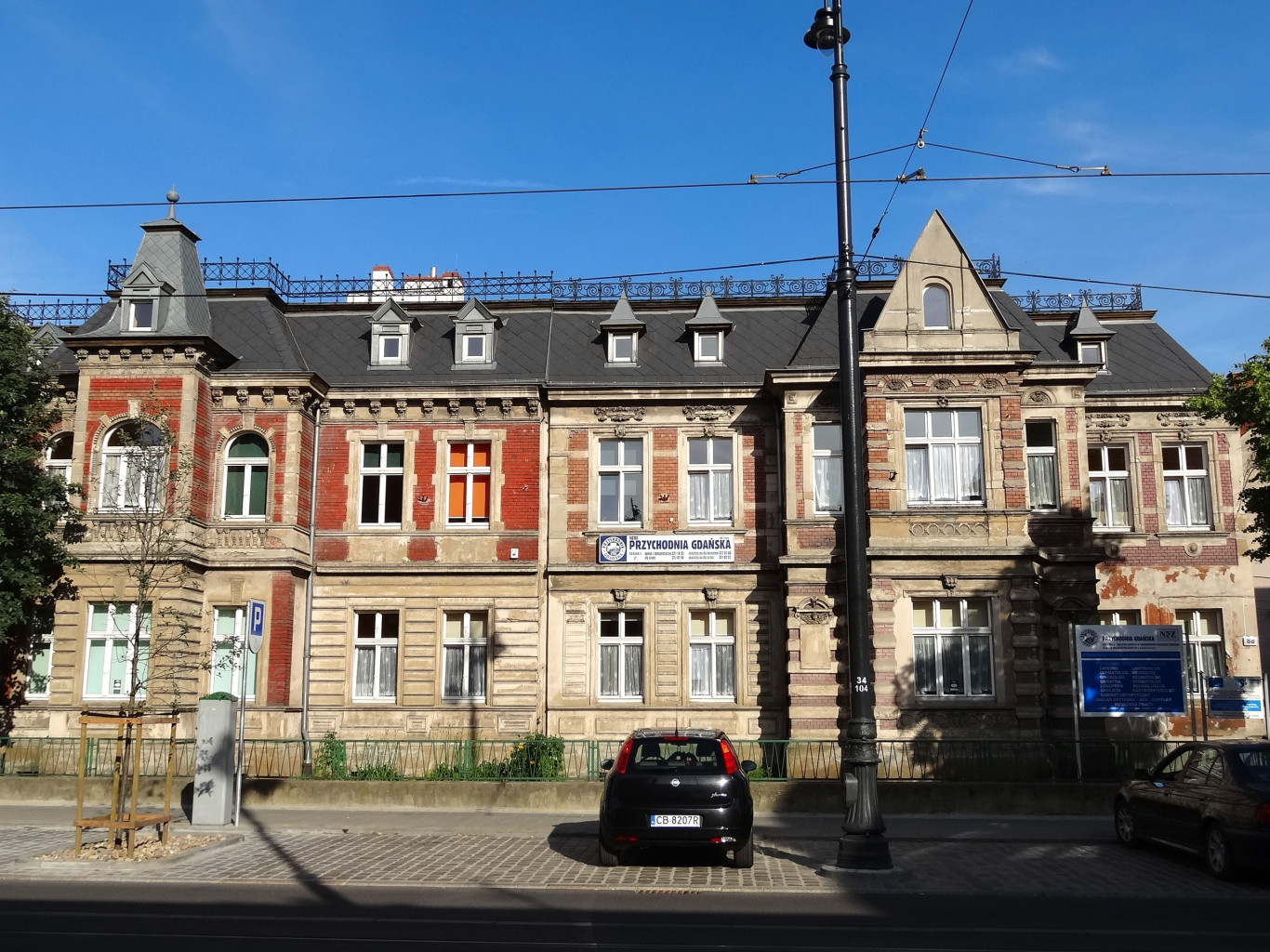
Villa Hugo Hecht from Gdańska Street

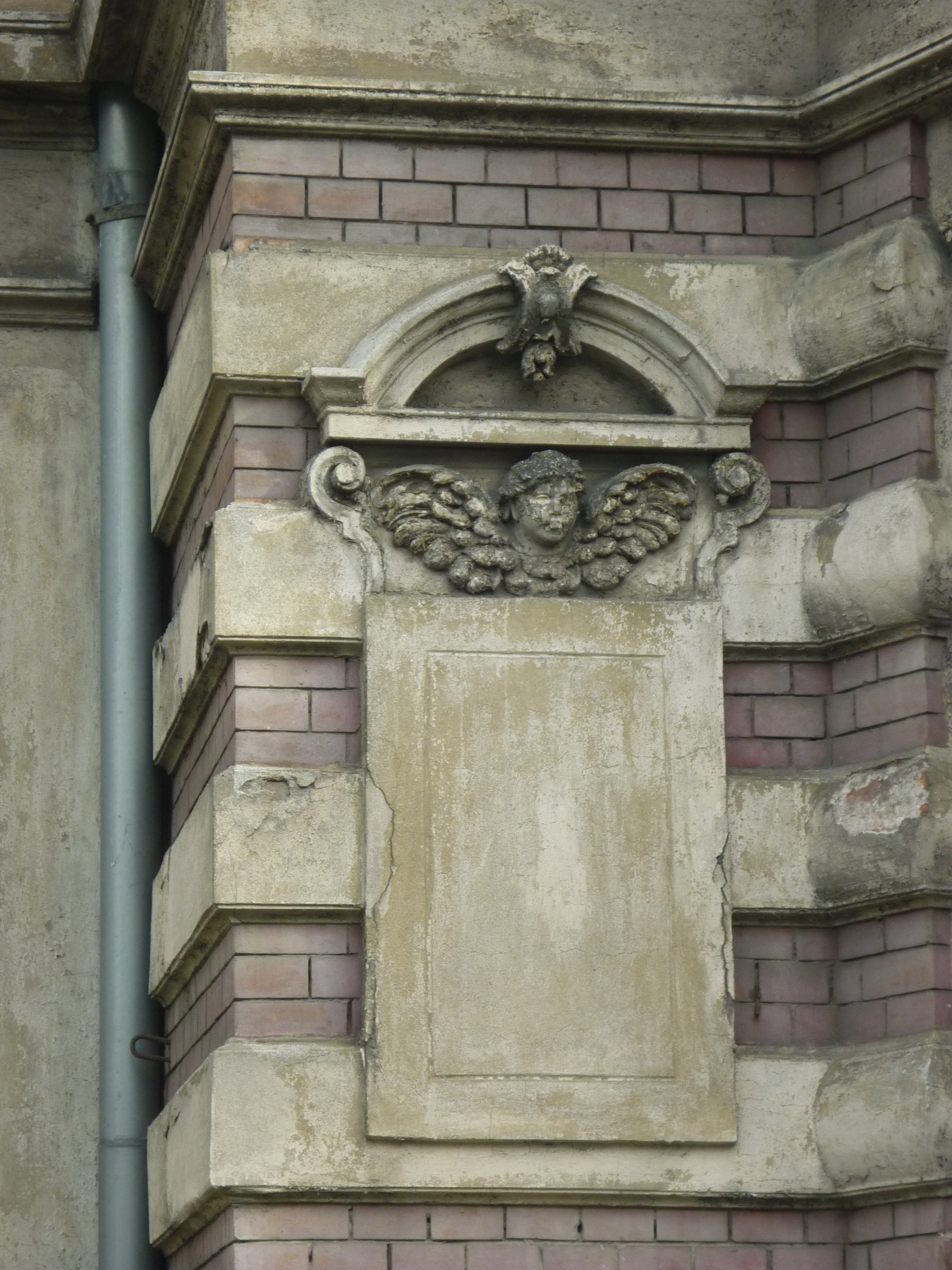
Ornament detail

=== Tenement at 89 ===
1880

Eclecticism, Neo-Renaissance.

The tenement at Danzigerstraße 51, was commissioned by Ludwig Rodemann who had a business in wood transportation (Firm "Rodemann & Wurl"). He lived at Danzigerstraße 33, now Gdańska 53.

The frontage, despite its lack of upkeep, features the following details: a Neo-Renaissance disposition of the openings, delicate cartouches on the bottom of first floor windows (displaying an eagle with two figures and floral motifs) and wrought iron balconies.

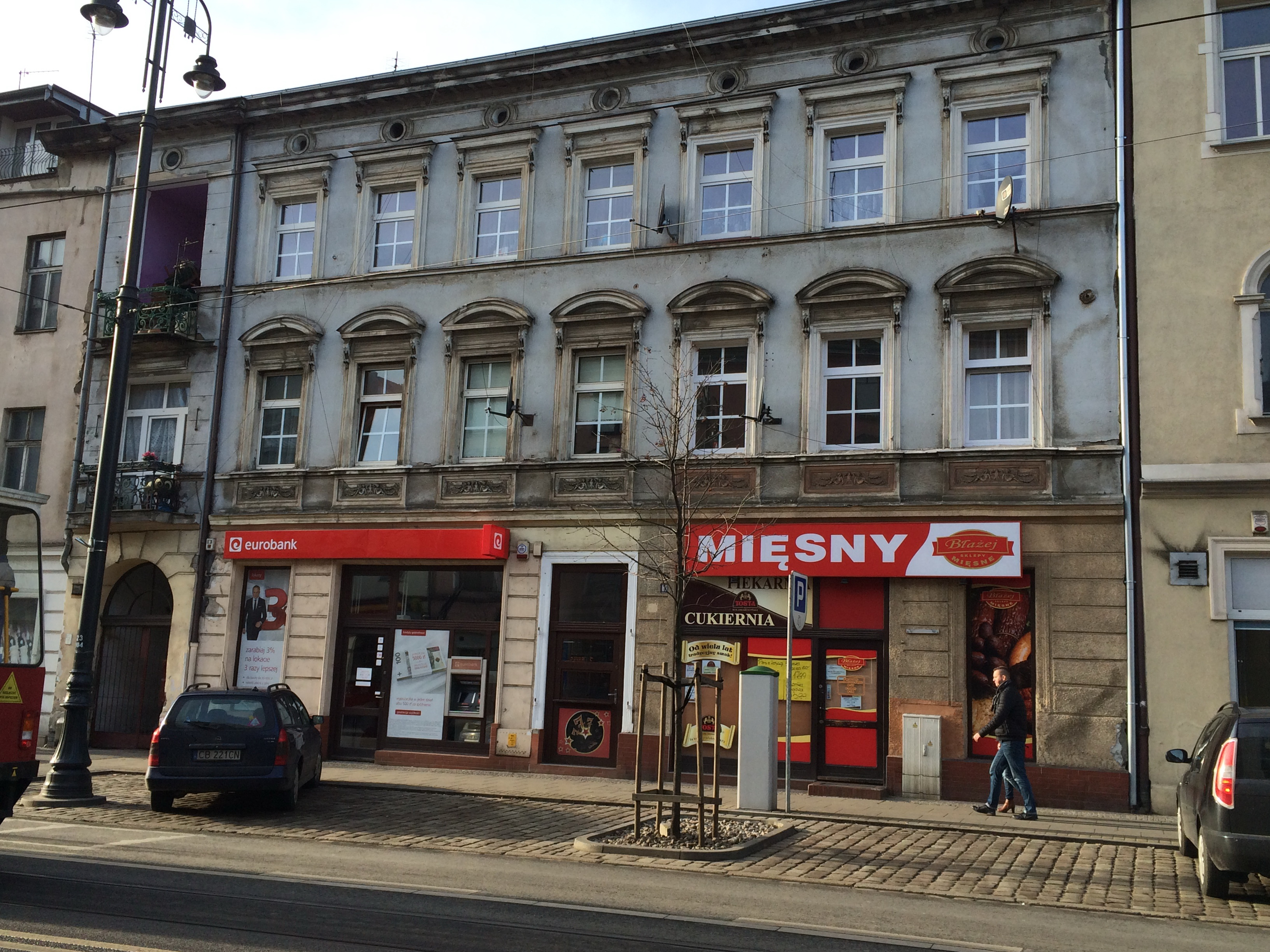
Main frontage

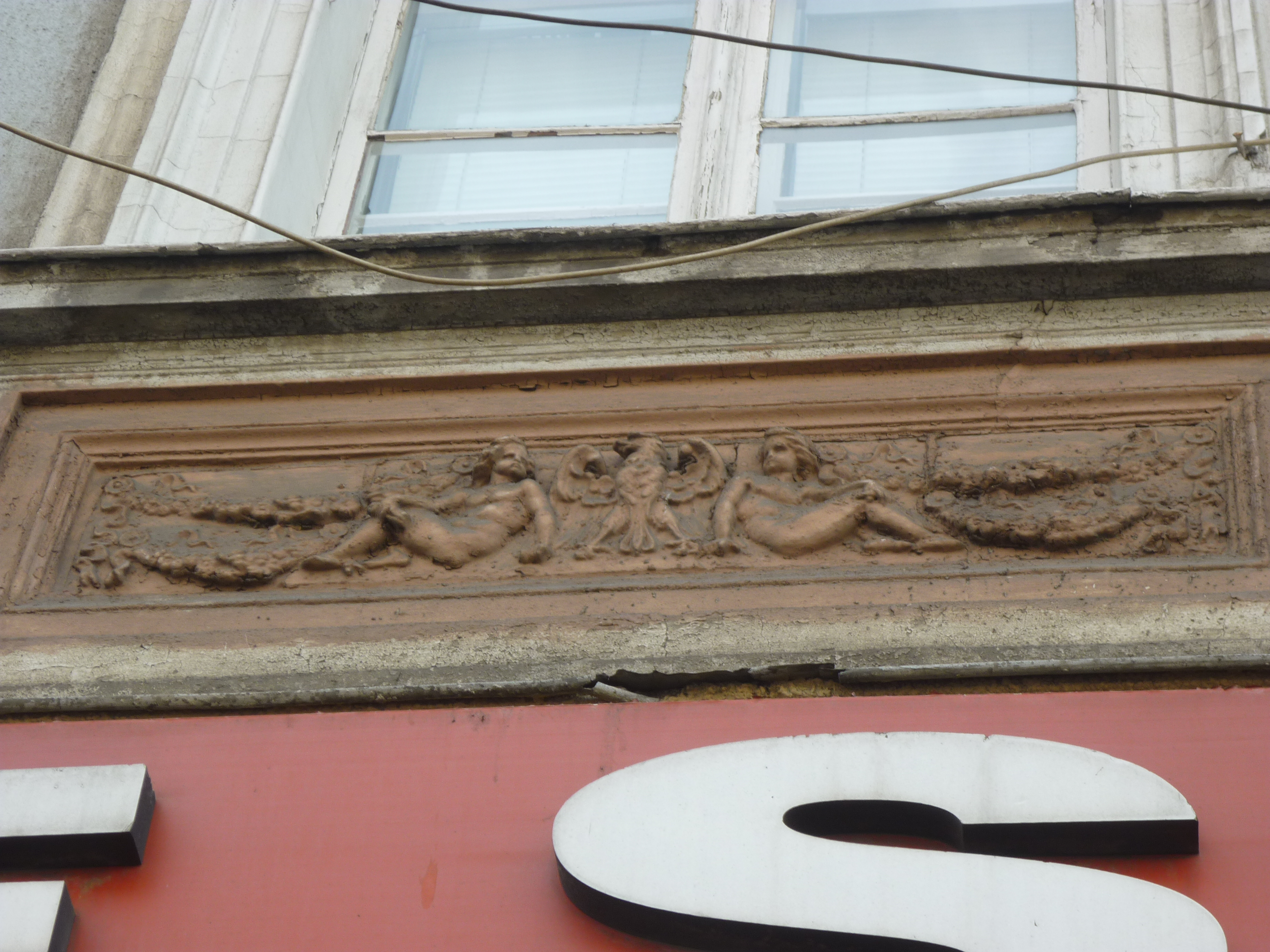
Detail of a cartouche decoration

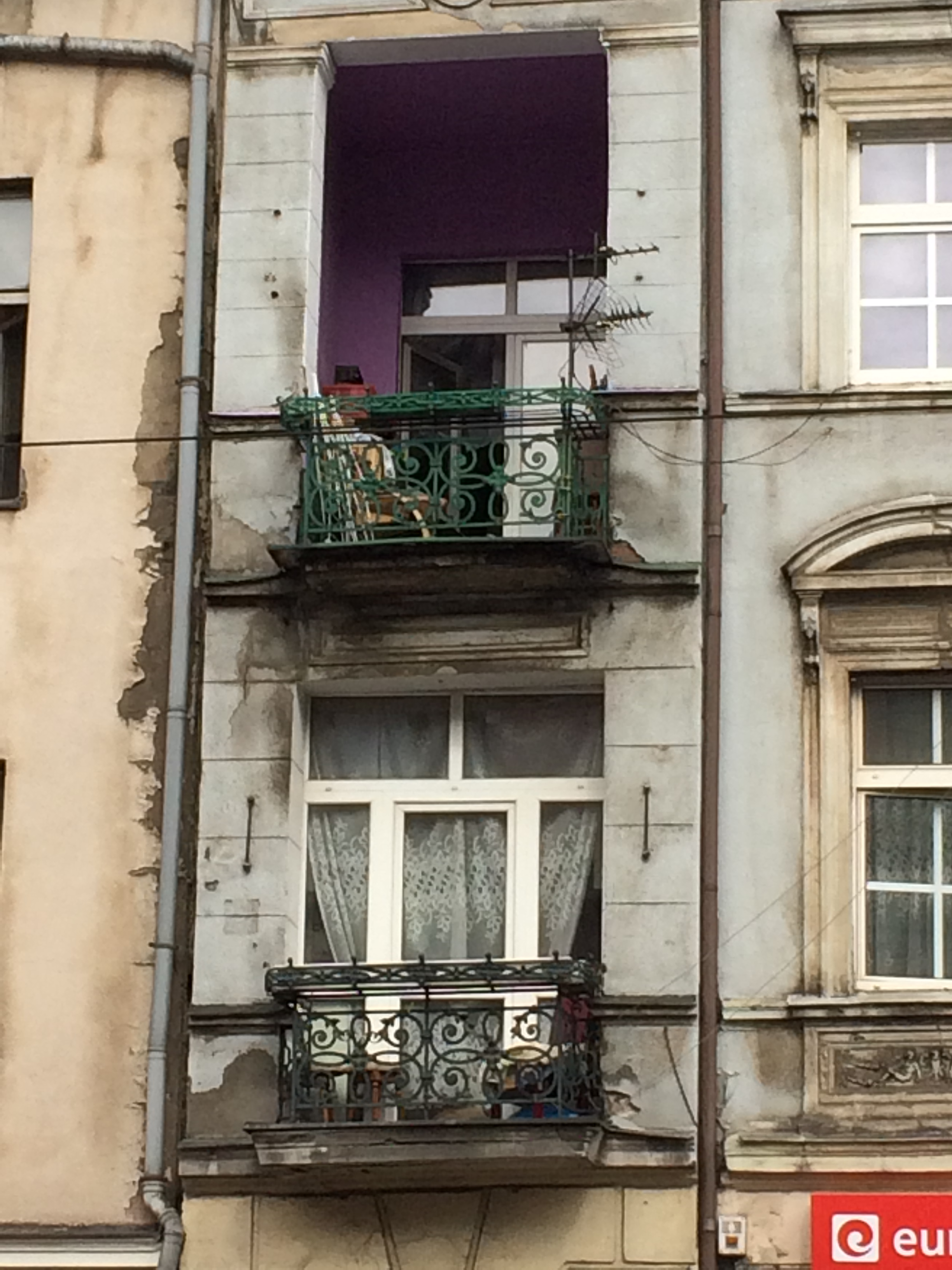
Balconies

=== Tenement at 91 ===
1898–1899, by Fritz Weidner

Historicism

The building shows similarity with a neighbouring one, at Nr.79, also designed by Fritz Weidner.

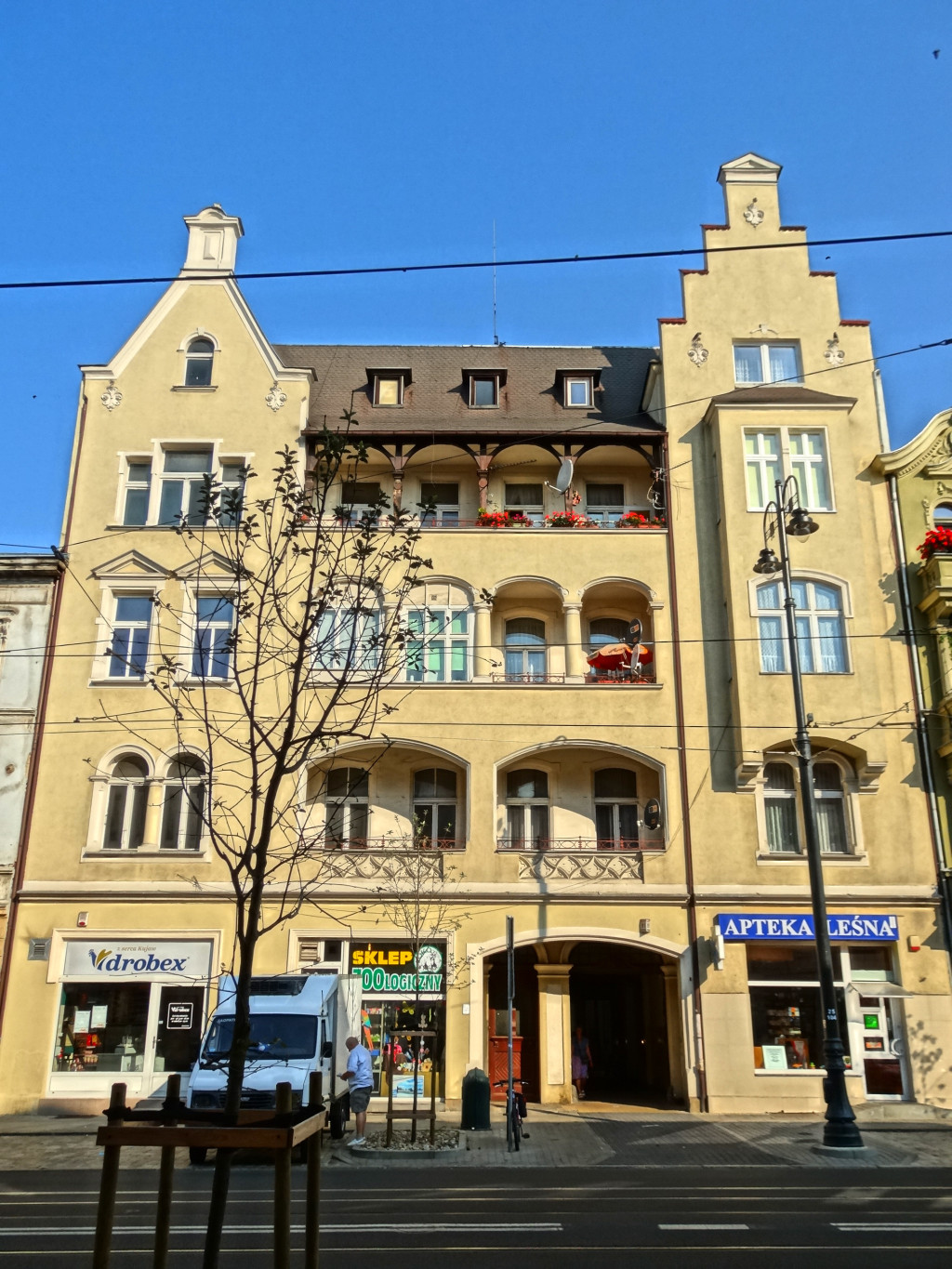
Main elevation

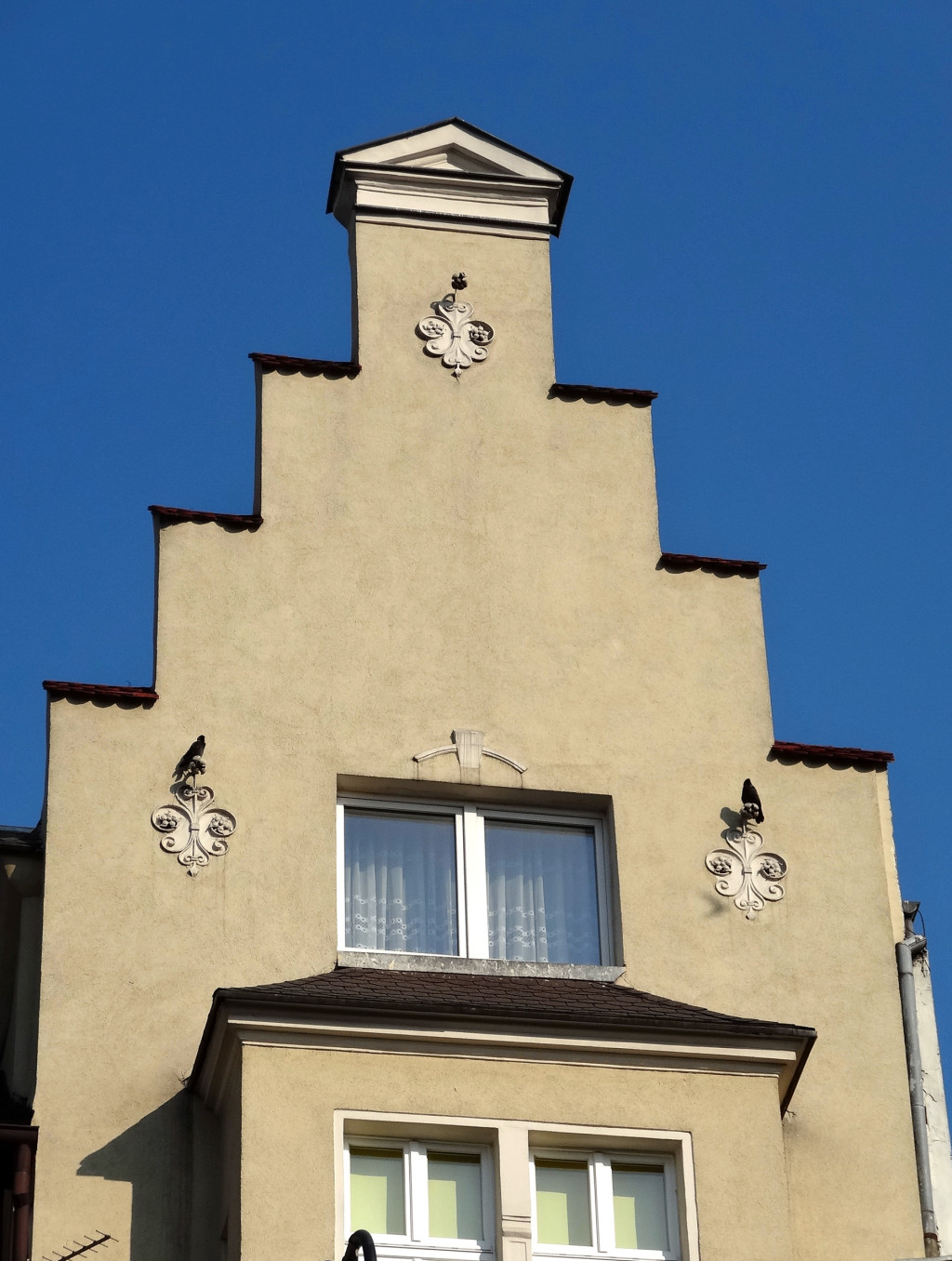
Detail of the roof

=== Hugo Hecht tenement, at 92/94 ===
Registered on Kuyavian-Pomeranian Voivodeship heritage list, Nr.A/269/1, August 21, 1991

1889–1892, by Józef Święcicki

French Neo-Renaissance

Marshal Józef Piłsudski was accommodated here in June 1921 during his stay in Bydgoszcz.

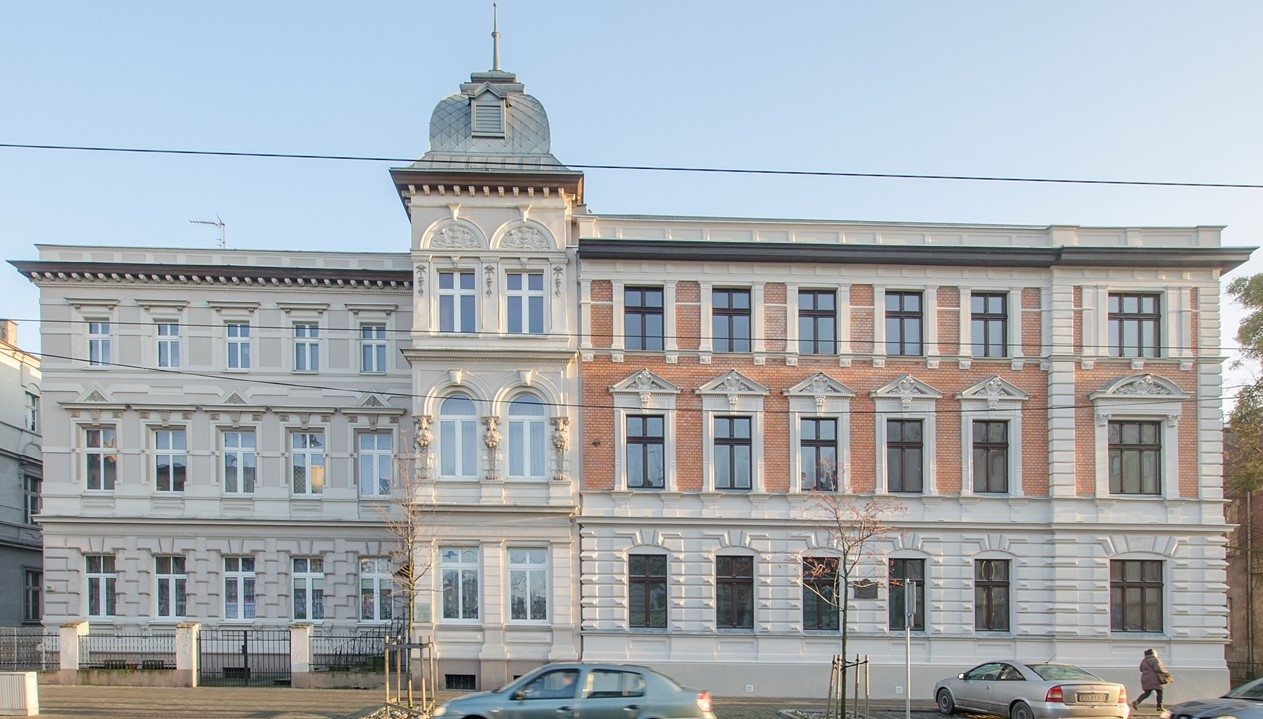
Frontages onto Gdańska Street

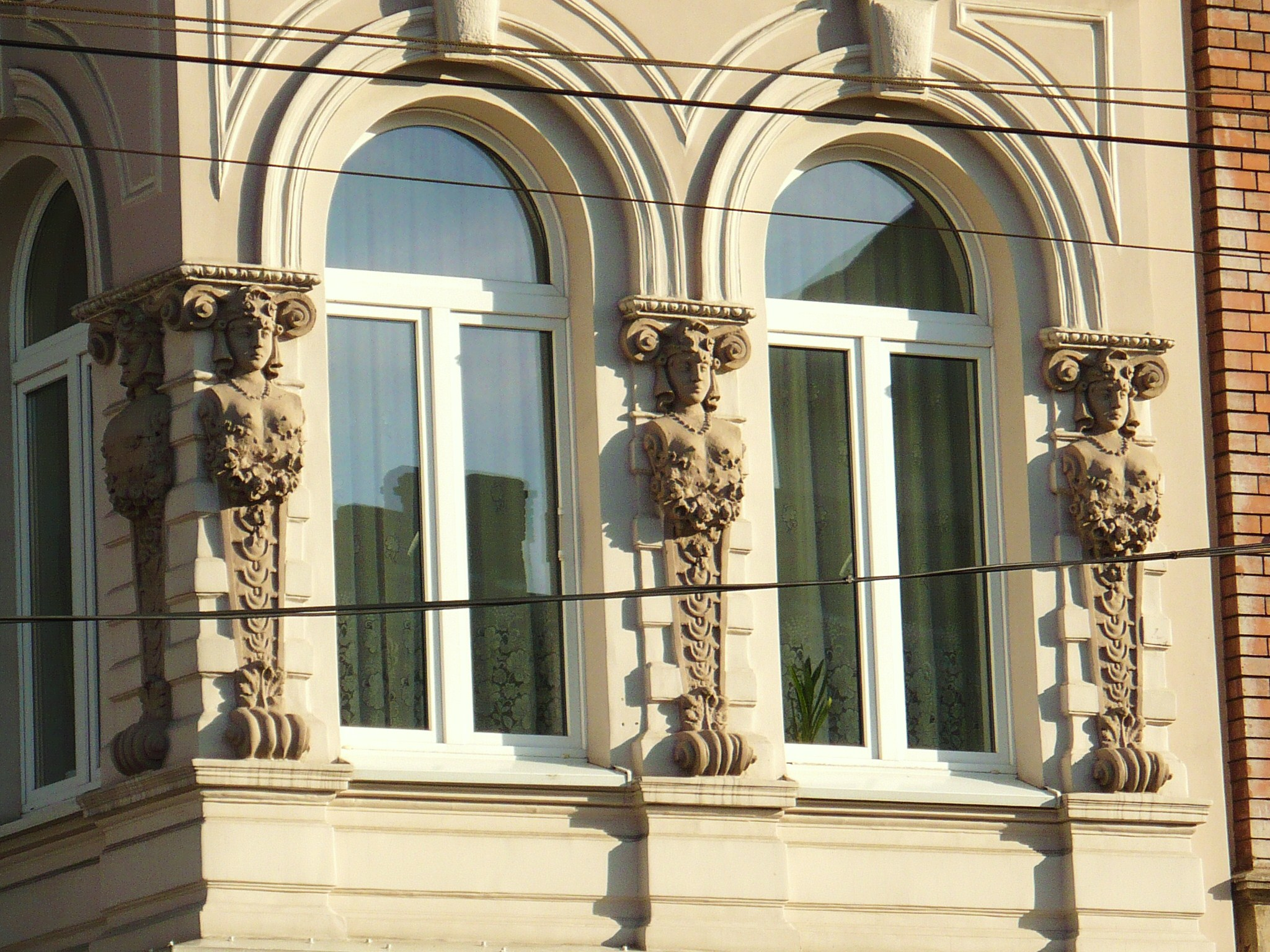
Herms

=== Carl Bradtke Tenement, at 93 ===
Registered on Kuyavian-Pomeranian Voivodeship heritage list, Nr.A/269/1, August 21, 1991

1895–1896, by Józef Święcicki

German Historicism & rokoko elements

The house was built for a master stonecutter, Carl Bradtke. His initials, CB, appear in a cartouche set in an upper pediment.

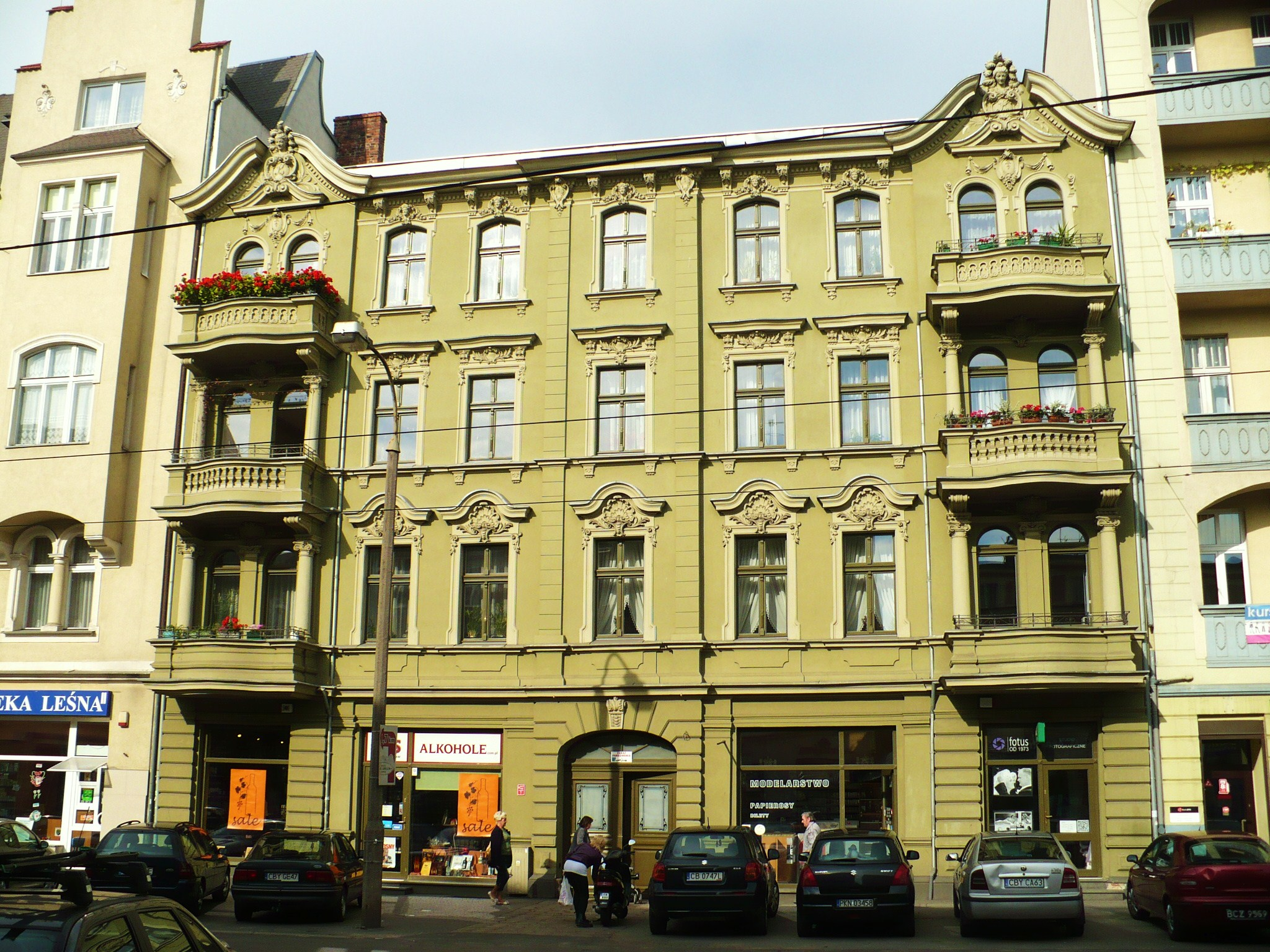
Main elevation

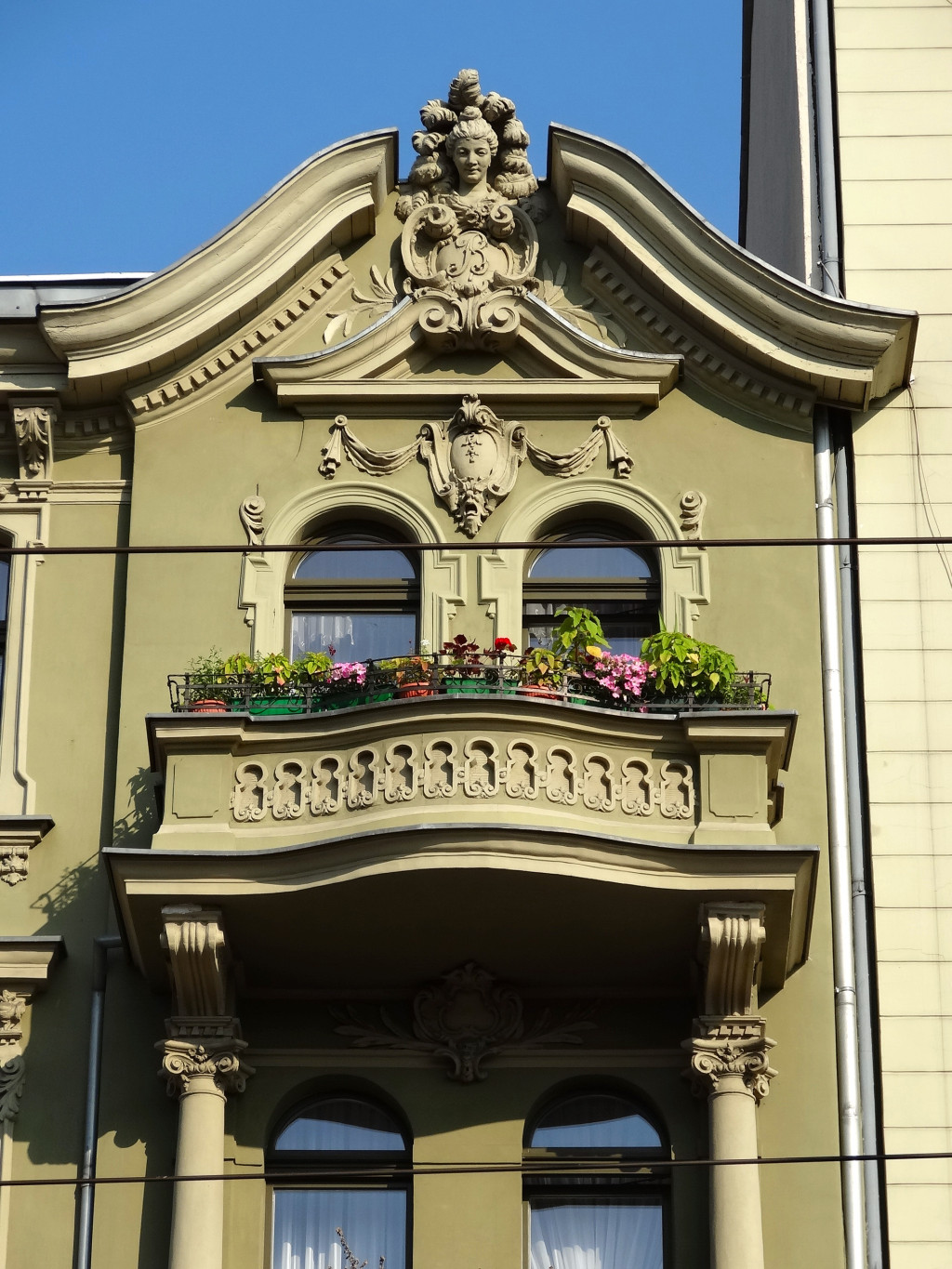
Detail of a balcony

=== Tenement at 95 ===
1912–1913, by Paul Sellner

Modern architecture

This tenement presents an early modernist style.

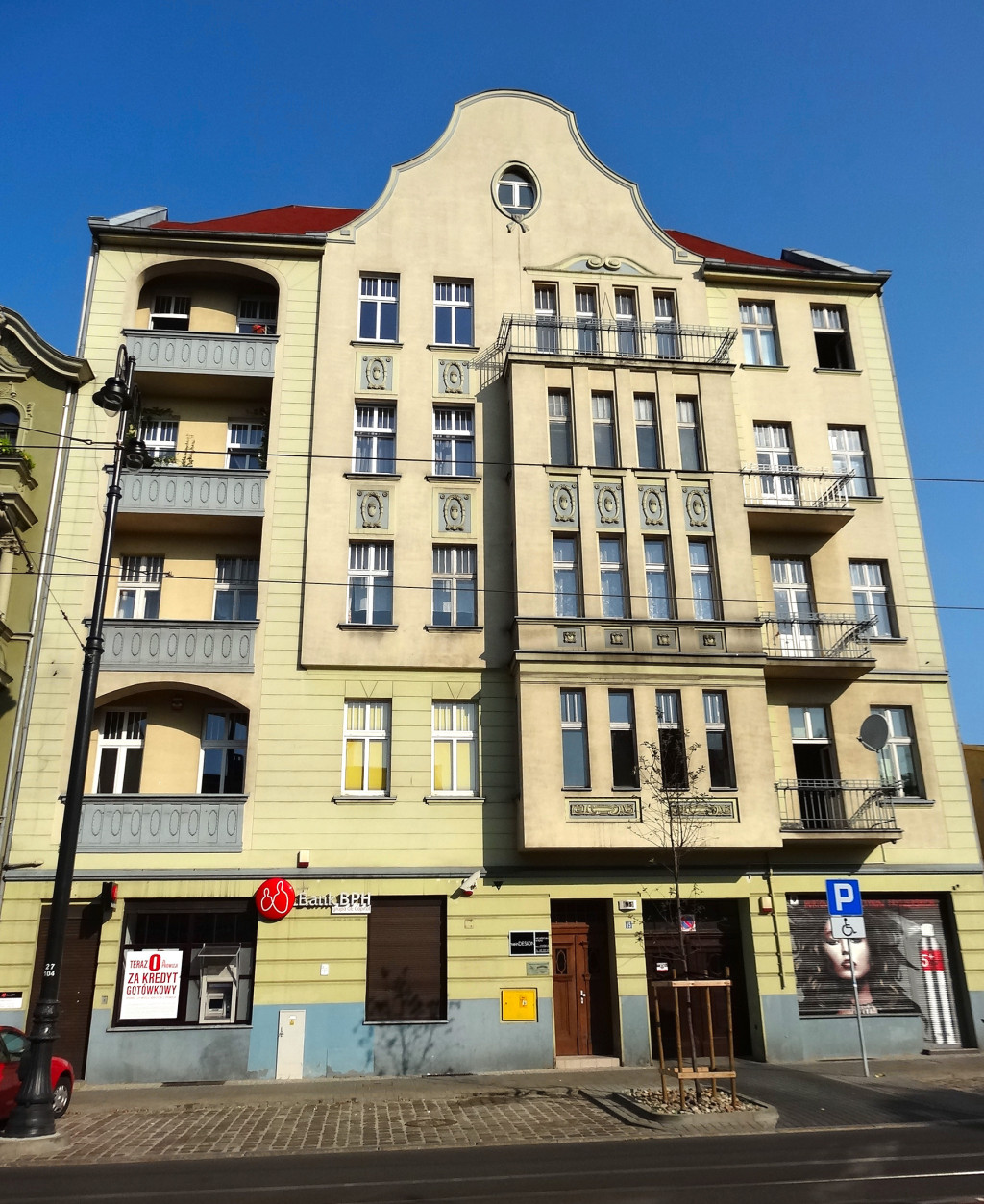
Main facade

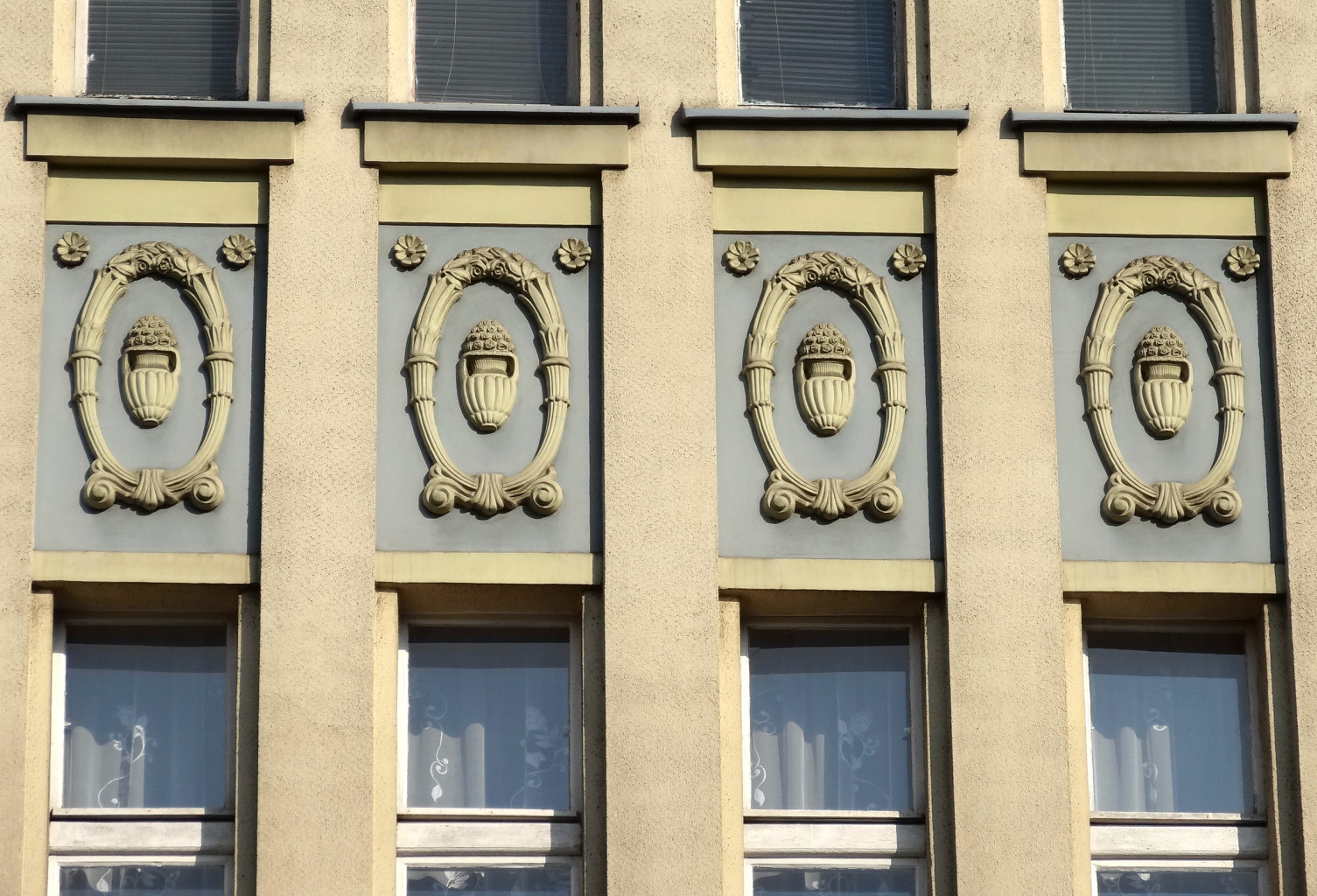
Detail of ornaments

=== Stanisław Rolbieski tenement, at 96 ===
1891–1892, by Józef Święcicki

Eclecticism & French Neo-Renaissance

It is the last edifice of a series of six ordered by Hugo Hecht and realized by Józef Święcicki.

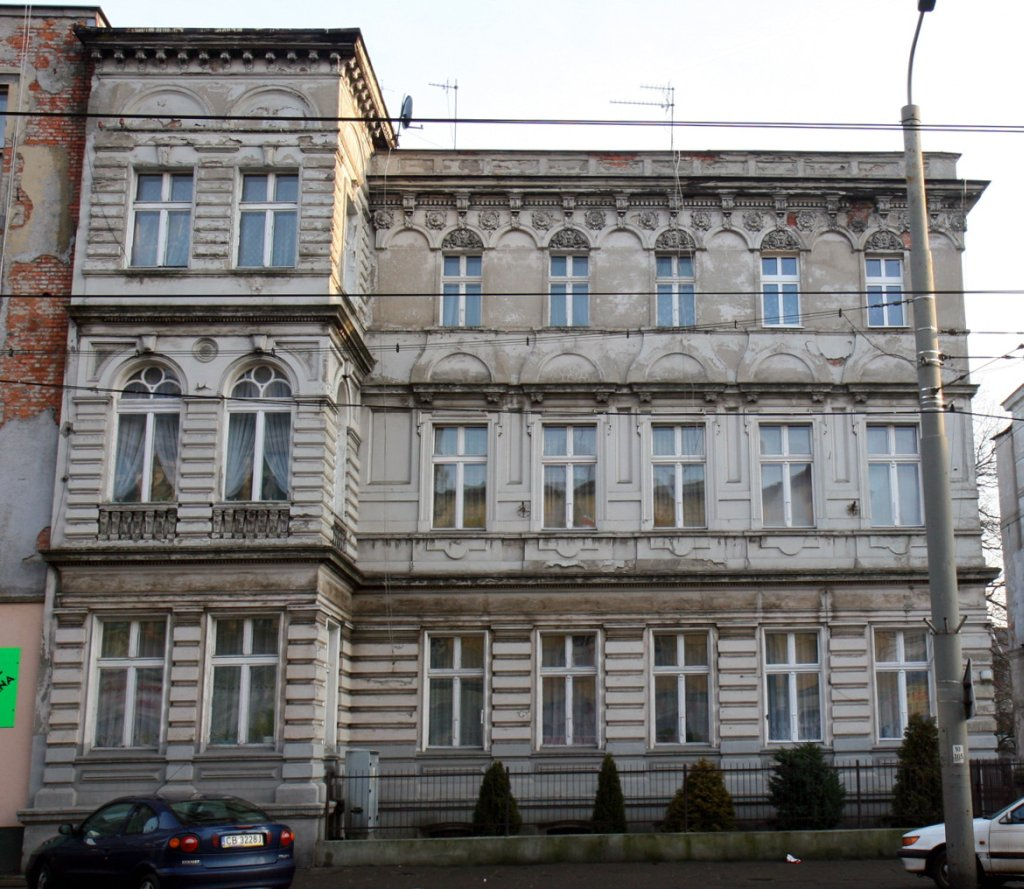
Main elevation

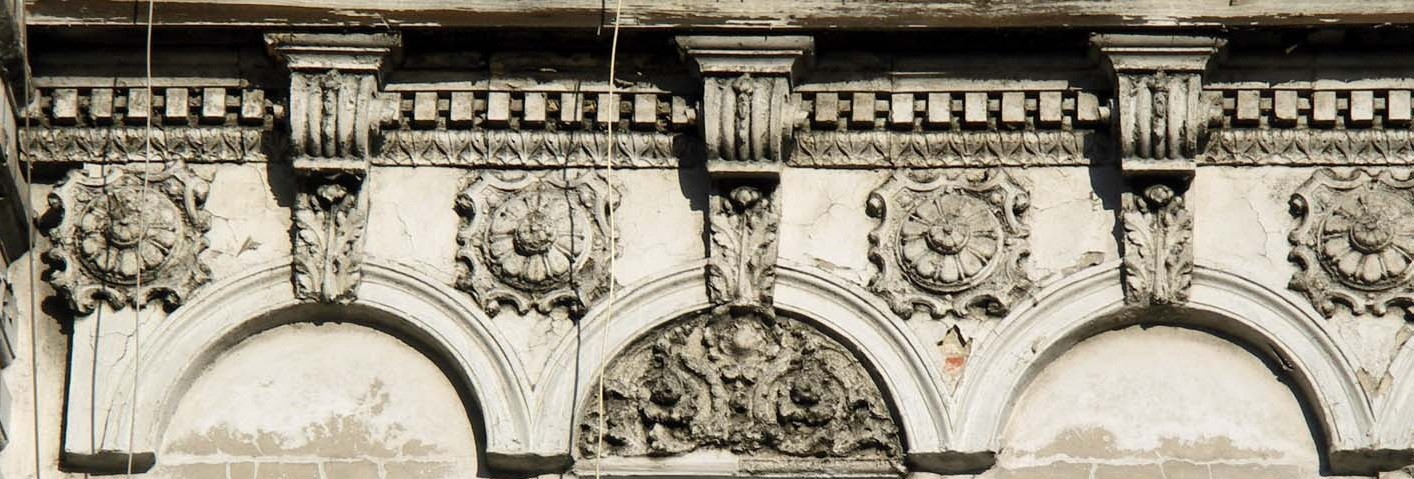
motifs detail

=== Reinhold Zschiesche Tenement at 1 Chocimska Street ===
1885–1888, by Józef Święcicki and Anton Hoffmann

Eclecticism

Reinhold Zschiesche was a restaurateur who ran his business on the ground floor.

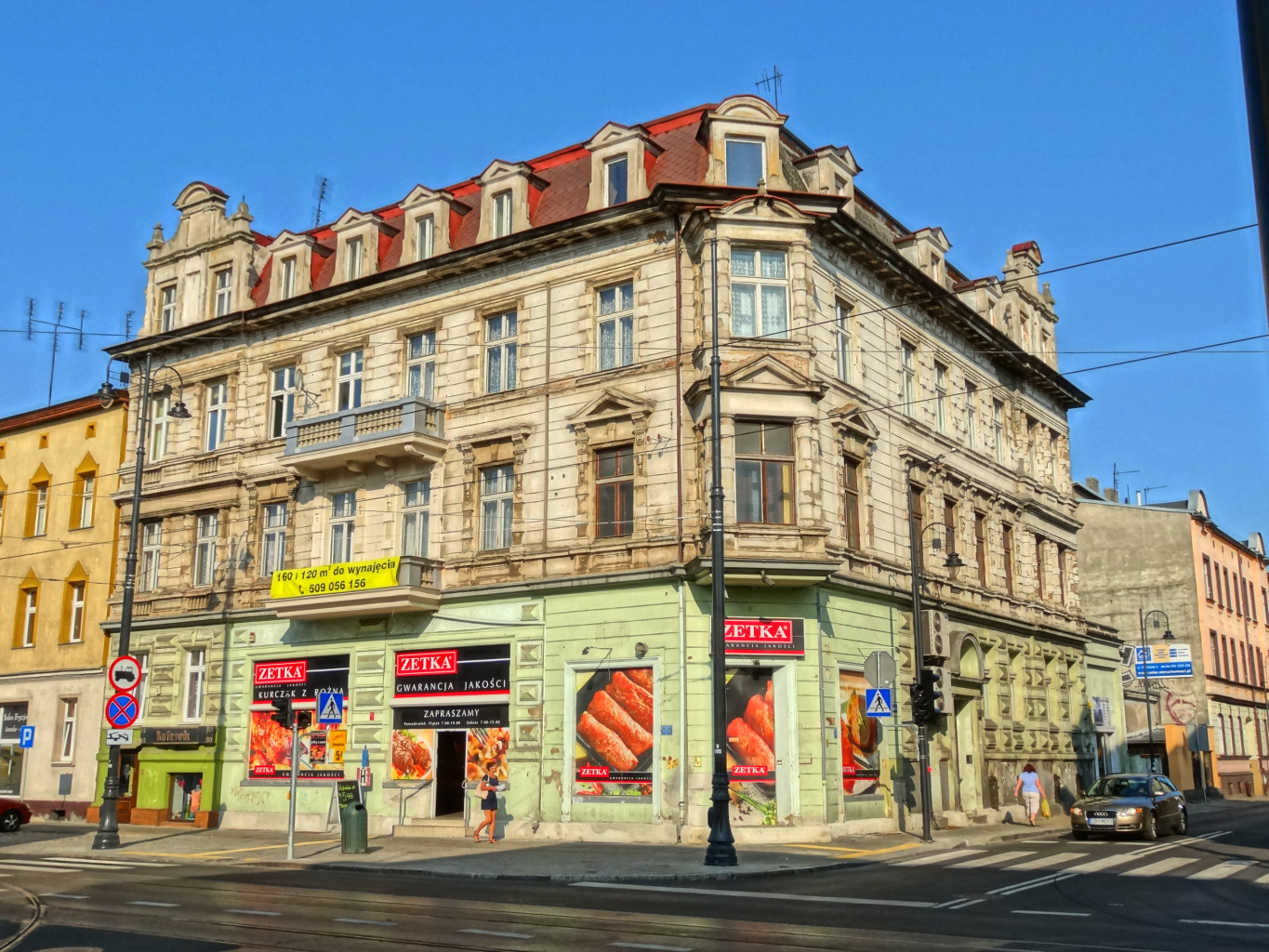
View of the corner

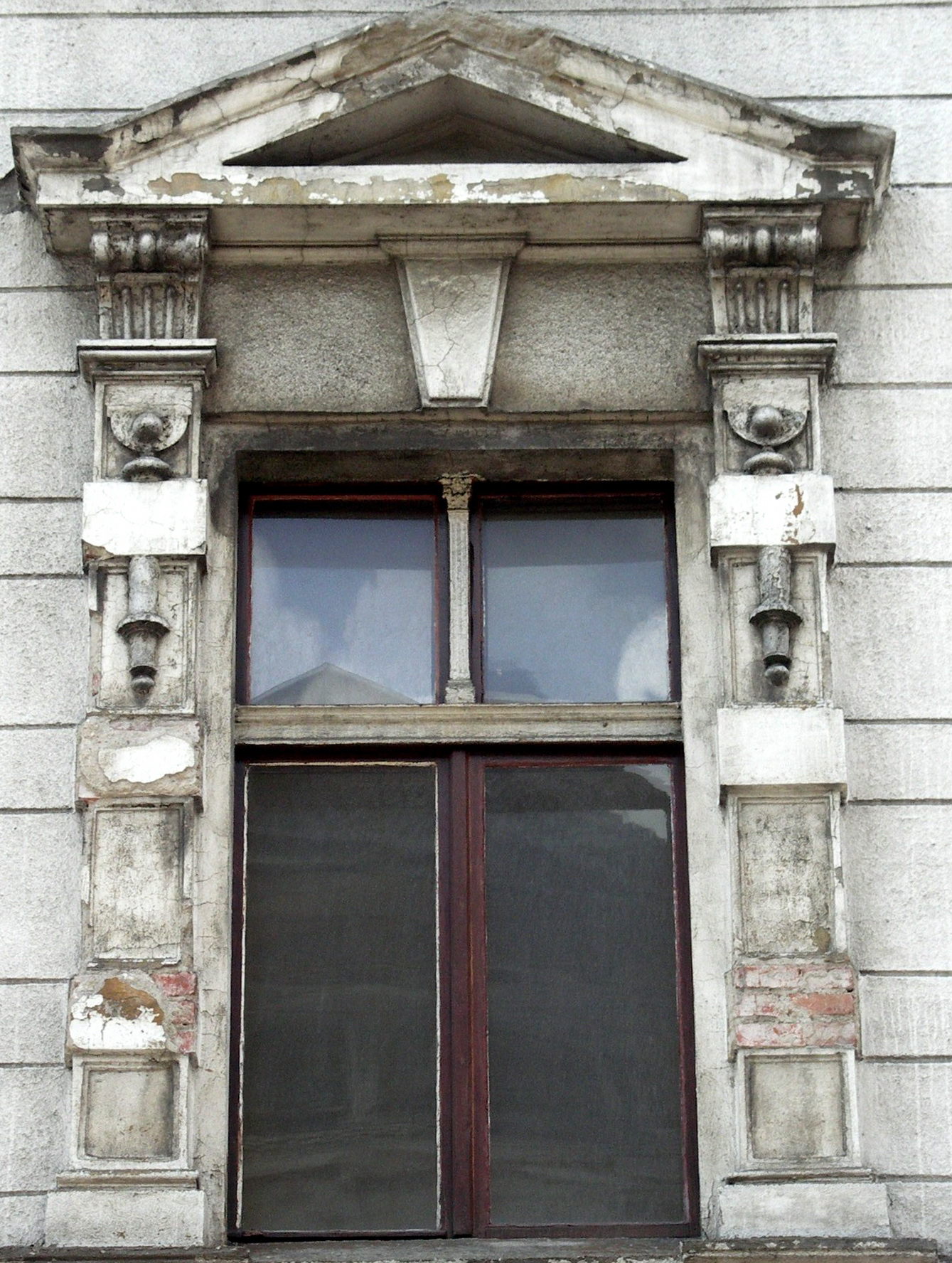
Window adornments

=== Tenement at 98, corner with 2 Chodkiewicza street ===
Built 1932–1933 by Józef Grodzki

Modern architecture

This functionalist tenement, together with the opposite one at 100 Gdańsk Street, strongly contrasts with the ancient buildings of the main downtown thoroughfare. Renovated in the late 2010s, part of the original decor (door carpentry, metal balcony balustrades, ceramic tiles) is still preserved.

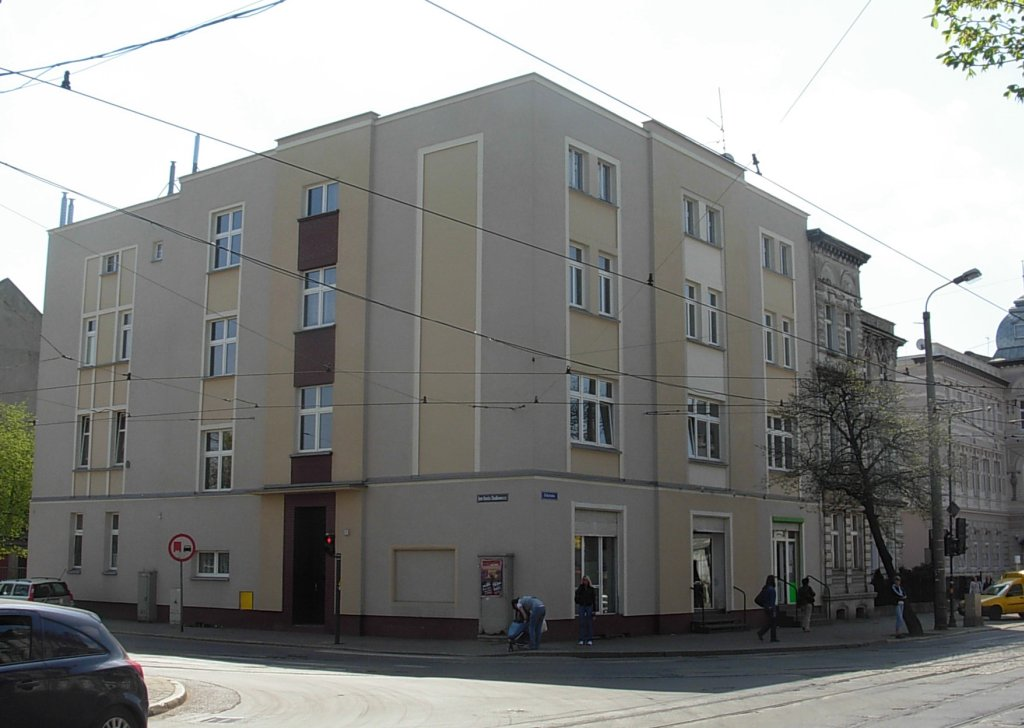
View from Gdańsk Street

=== Tenement at 99 ===
1883

Eclecticism & Neoclassical Architecture

The tenement at then Danzigerstraße 56, has been commissioned by Adelheid Gaertner or Gärtner, a dyer. The edifice has been refurbished in 2012.

The eclectic facade displays neo-classical elements: perfect symmetry in the facade balance, decoration of the openings on each level (pediments, thin pilasters) and an interesting frontispiece overhanging the entrance, featuring a man head.

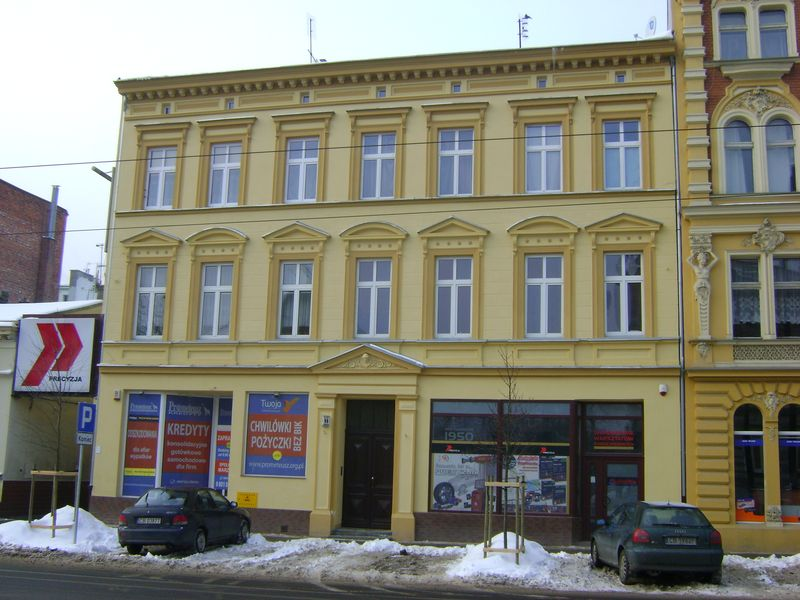
Main facade

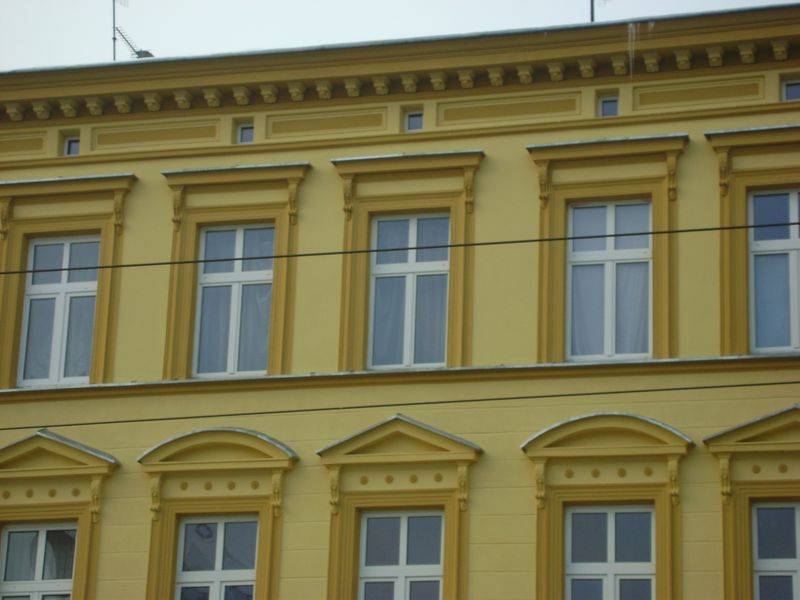
View of the 2nd floor

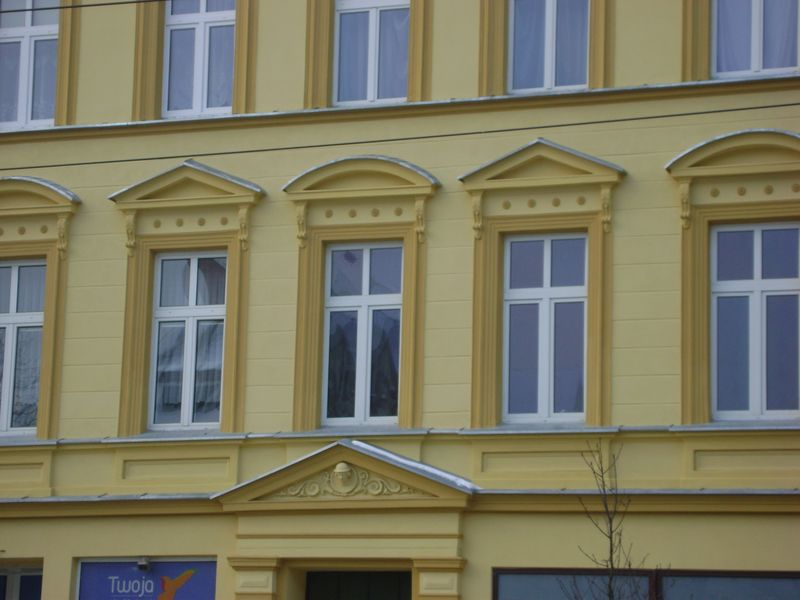
View of the first floor and the frontispiece

=== Adam Wysocki Tenement at 100, corner with Chodkiewicza street ===
Built in the 1935 by Paweł Wawrzon

Modern architecture

Adam Wysocki, running a business of chimney sweeping, commissioned the building in the early 1930s. Local architect was Paweł Wawrzon, from Bydgoszcz, living at 6 Kościuszki street.

Geometric features of the facades recall contemporary realizations in the city, especially those designed by Jan Kossowski or Bolesław Polakiewicz.

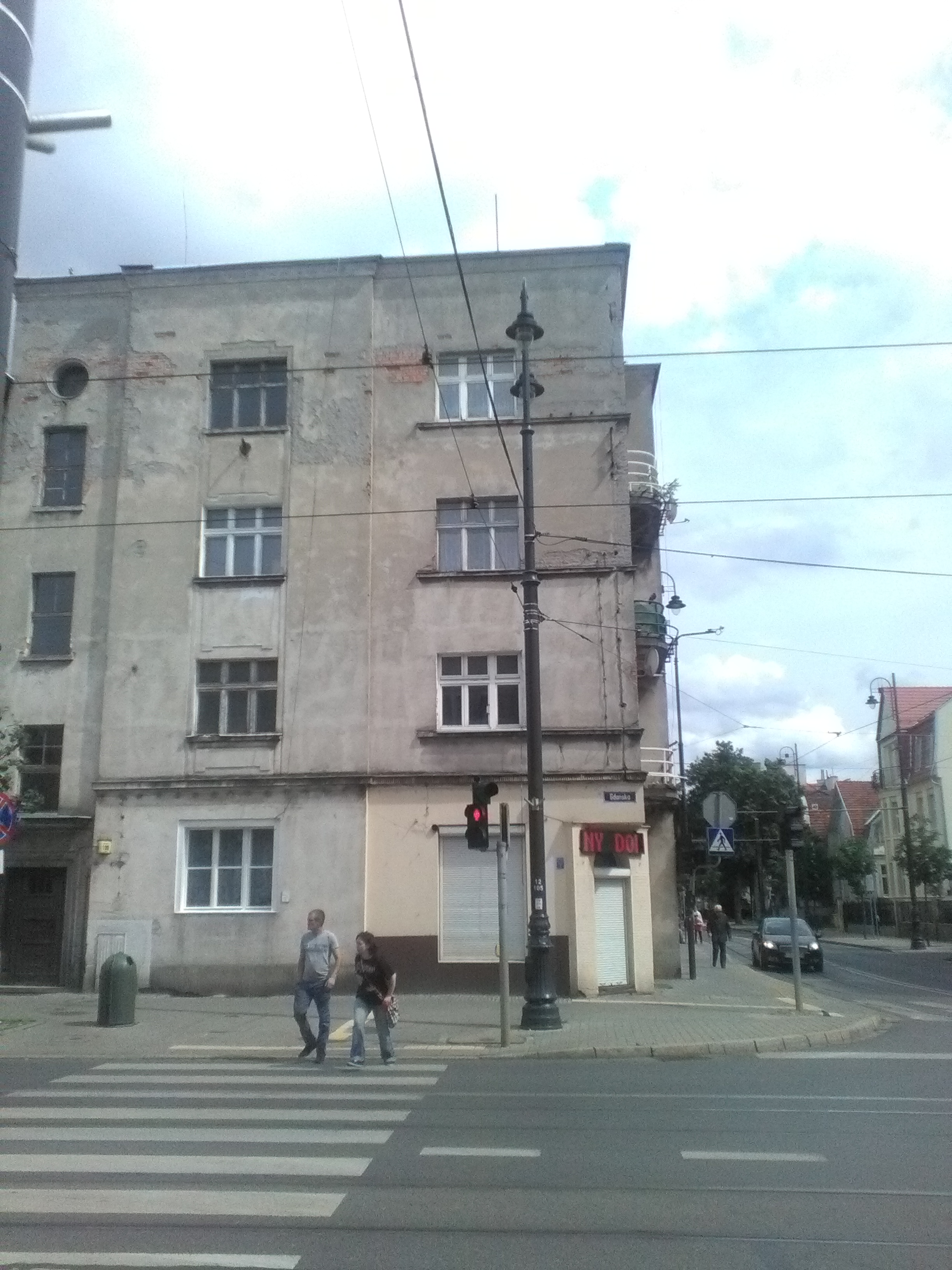
Main facade onto Gdańska

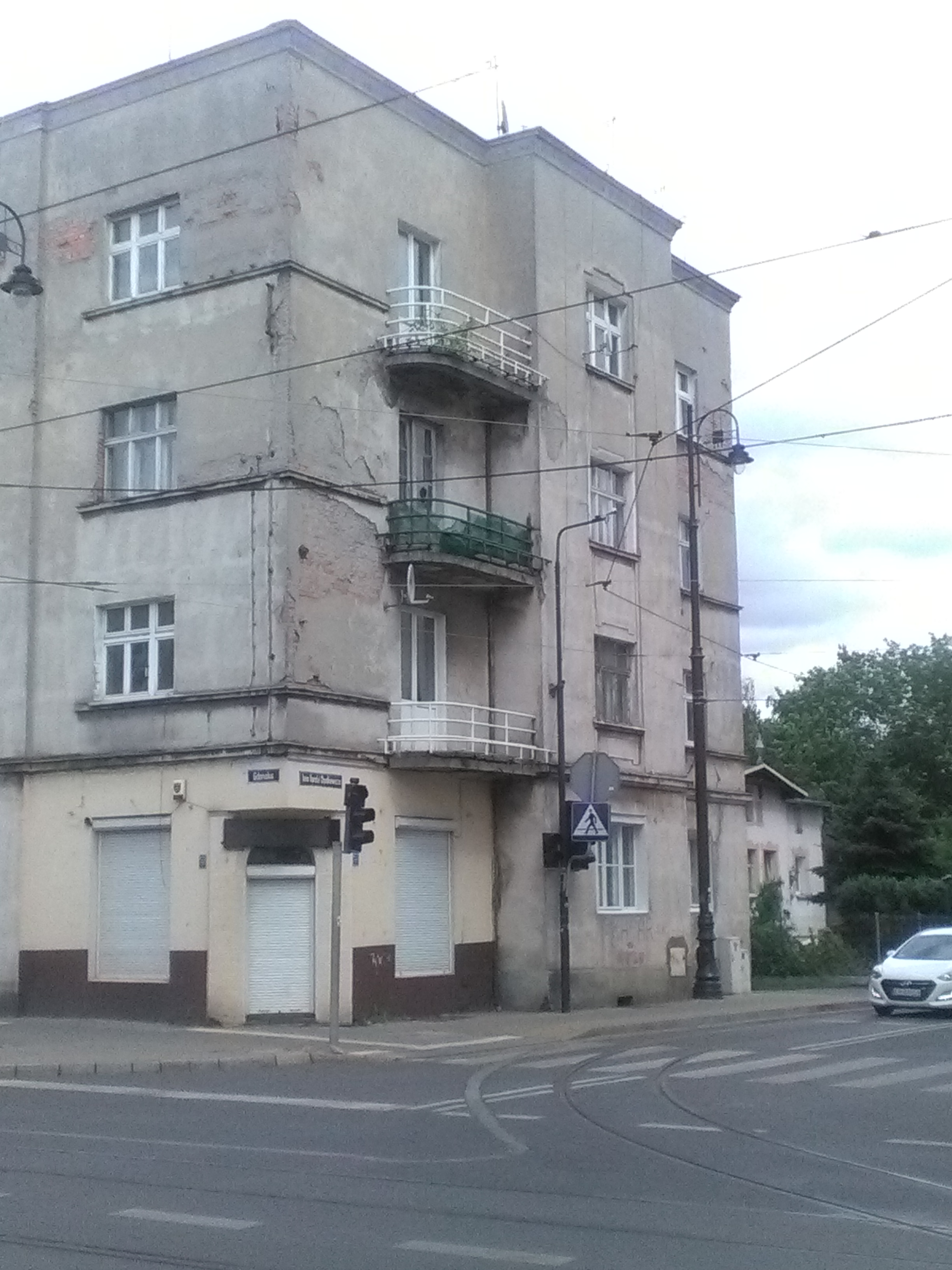
Elevation onto Chodkiewicza

=== Carl Peschel tenement, at 101 ===
Registered on Kuyavian-Pomeranian Voivodeship heritage list, Nr.A/11, October 12, 1999

1892–1893, by Józef Święcicki

Eclecticism & rokoko

The building was designed as a renting house and commercial area.

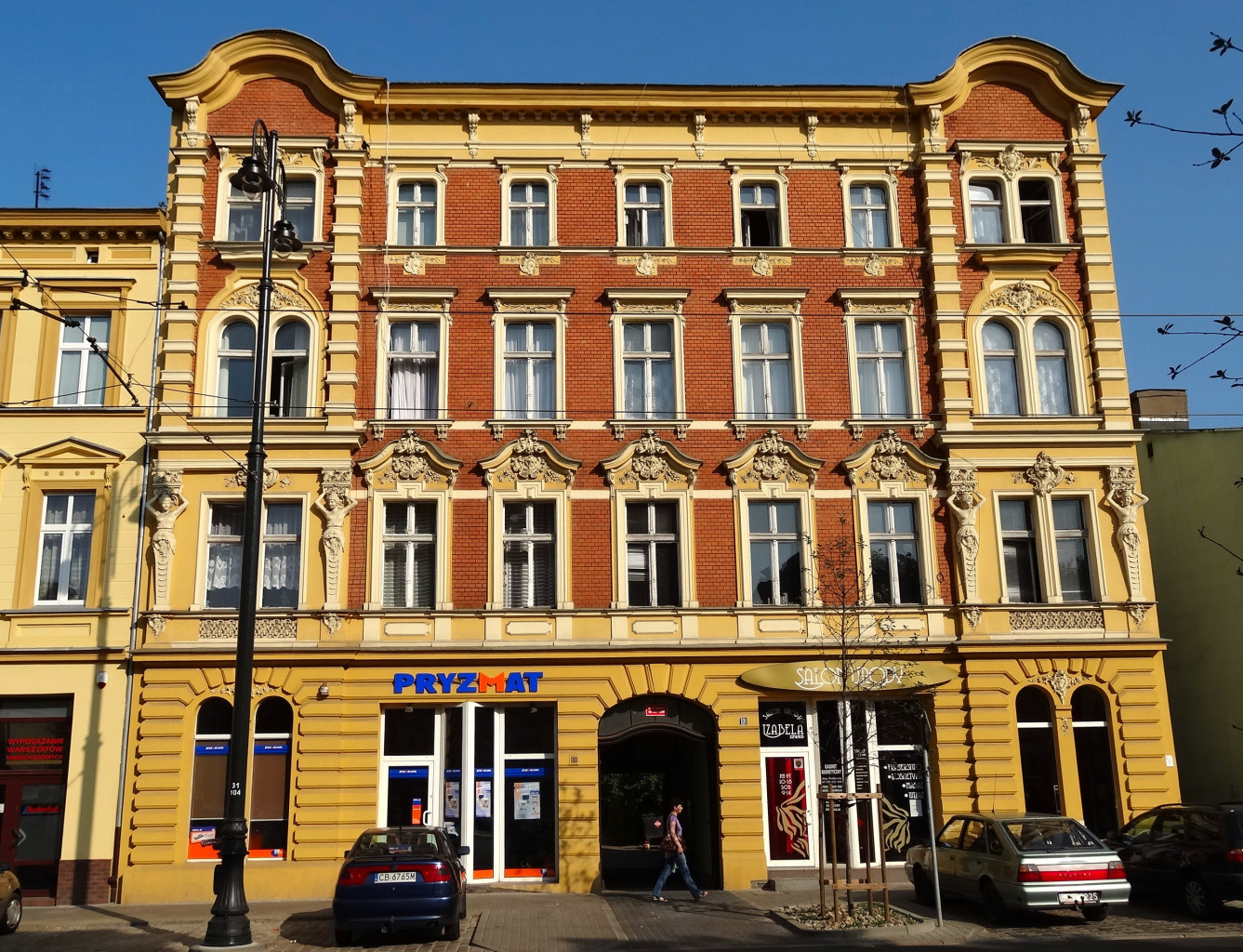
Main elevation

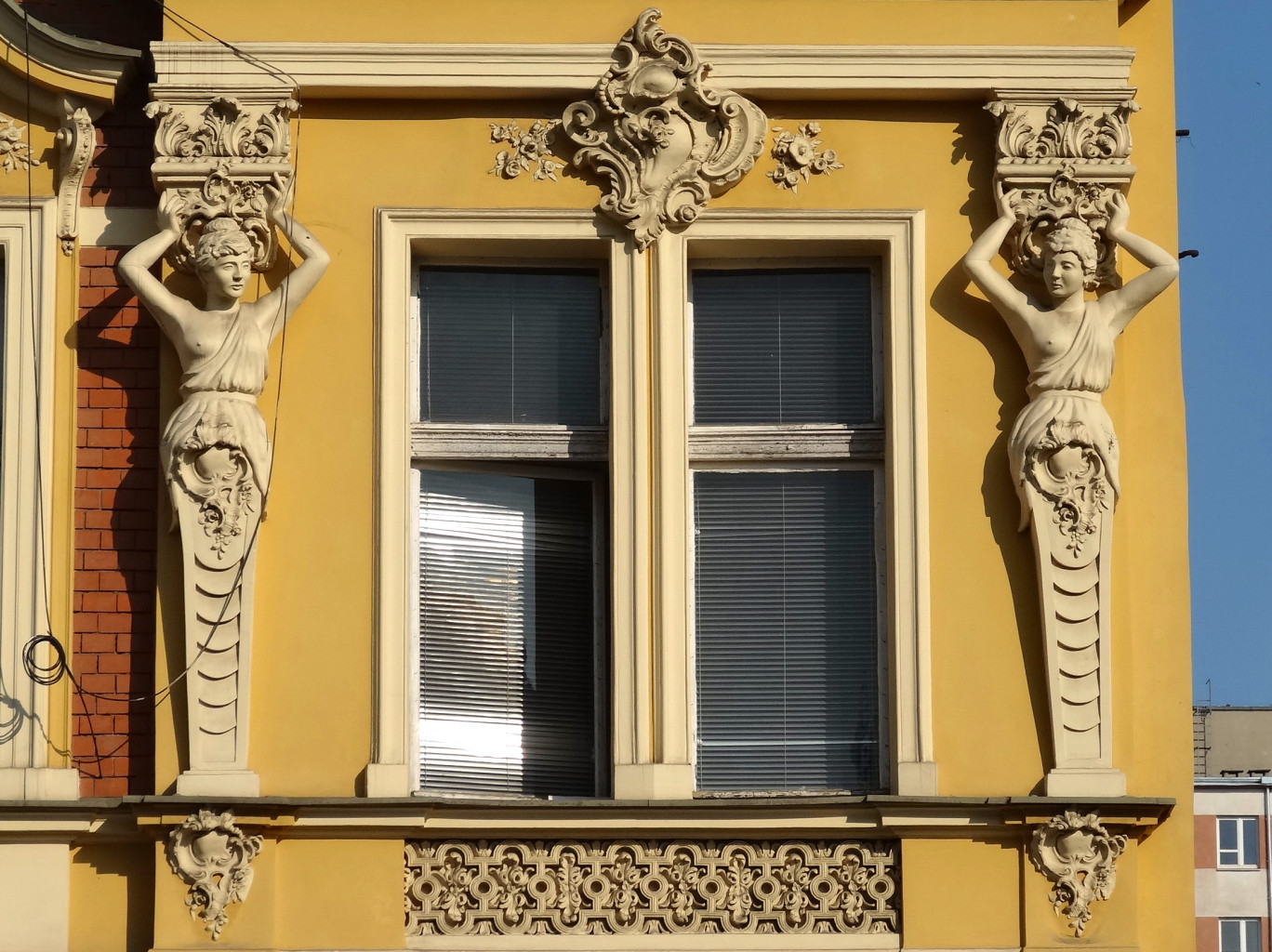
Window decoration with herms

=== Johann Schauer tenement, at 107 ===
1887, by F. Meyer

Eclecticism

Johann Schauer, house's first owner, was a tailor.

The building has been thoroughly restored in December 2018. One can appreciate the details of the motifs: in the adorned openings, in the cartouches, the upper frieze or the decorated lintel.

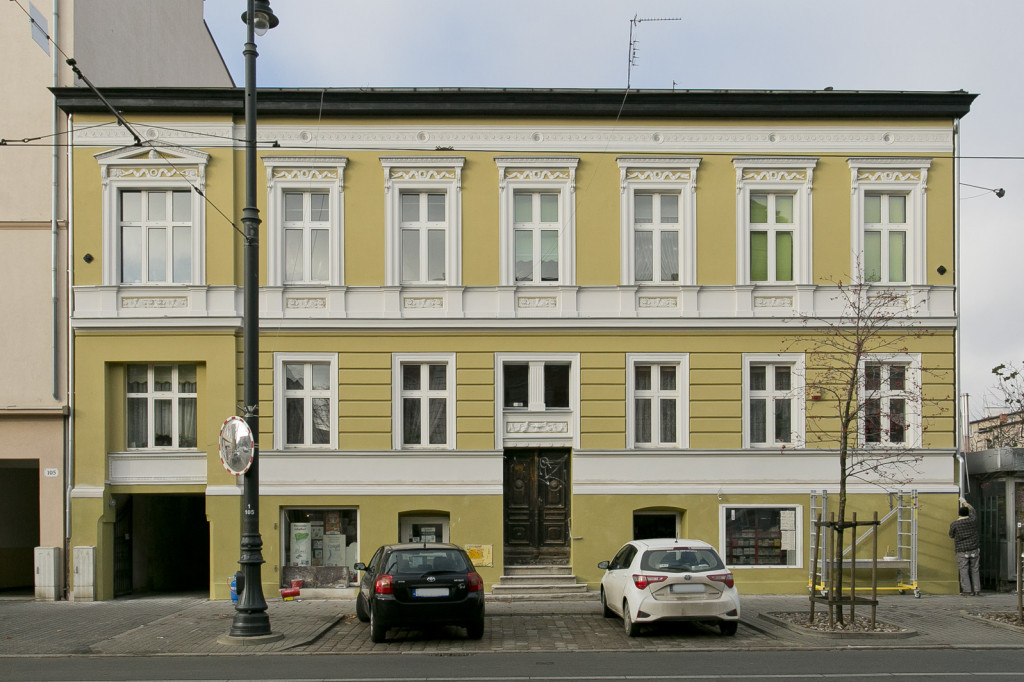
Main elevation

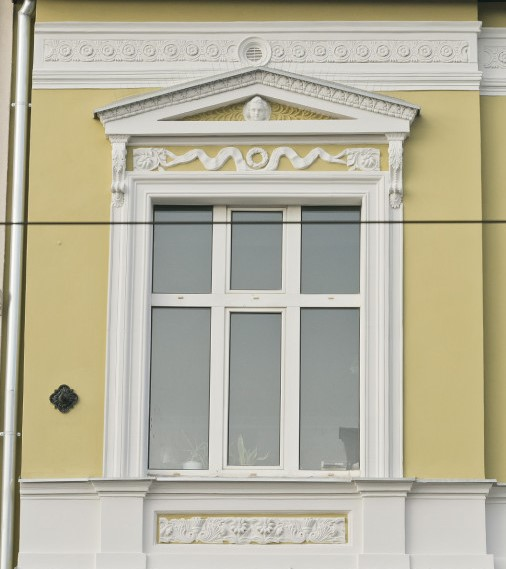
Ornamented window

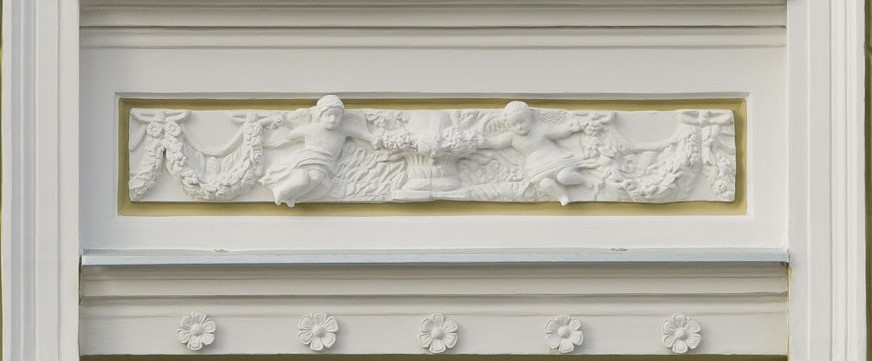
Cartouche

=== Rudolf Gehrke tenement, at 113, corner with Chocimska street ===
1886, by Józef Święcicki and Anton Hoffmann

Eclecticism & Neo-Renaissance.

The first owner was Reinhold Zschiesche, also an owner at 1 Chocimska Street. In the eclectic decoration, Józef Święcicki used Neo-Renaissance details. The entrance from Gdańsk Street is topped with a head figure in a cartouche. The tenement has been renovated in 2021.

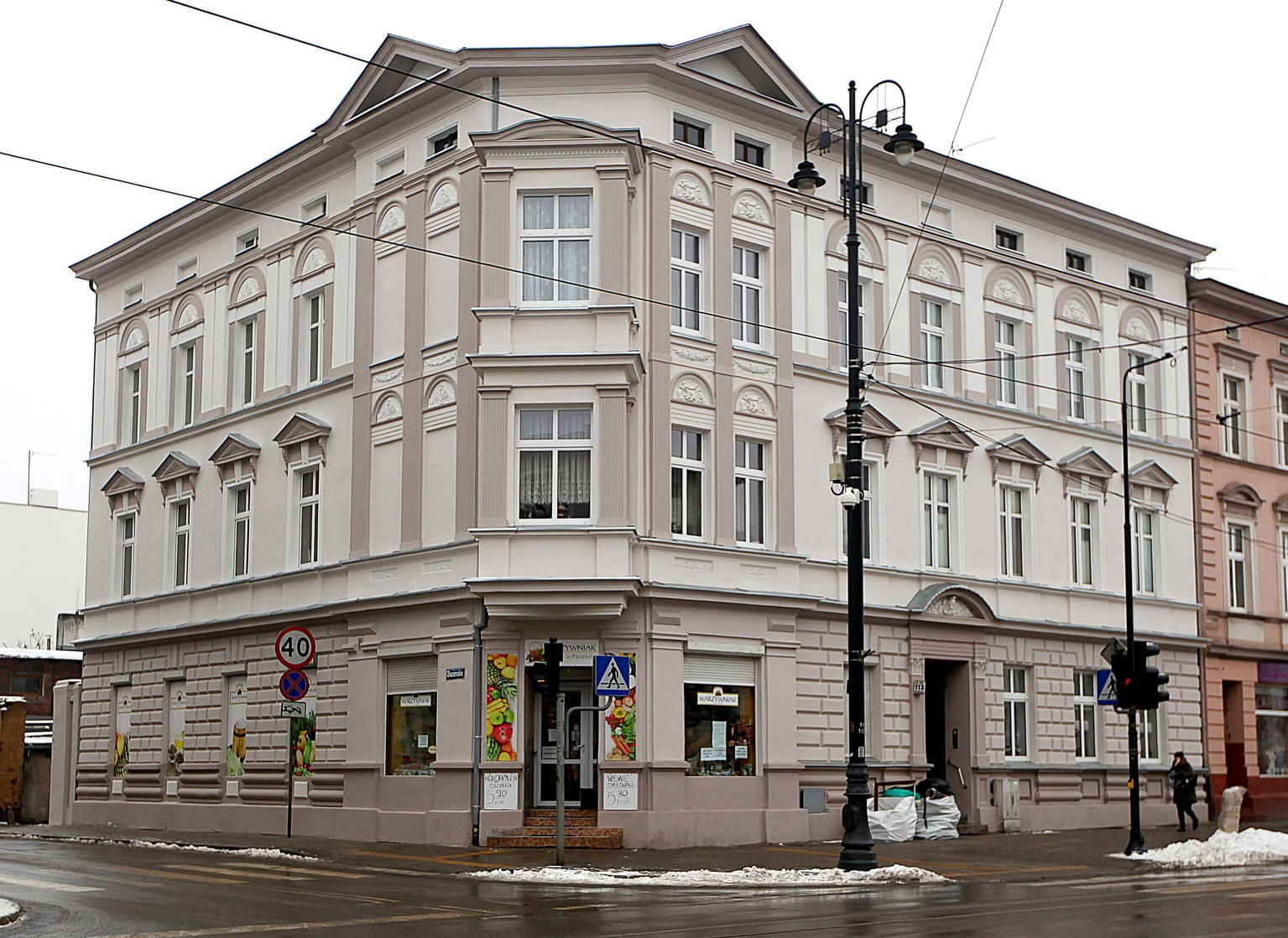
Renovated facade

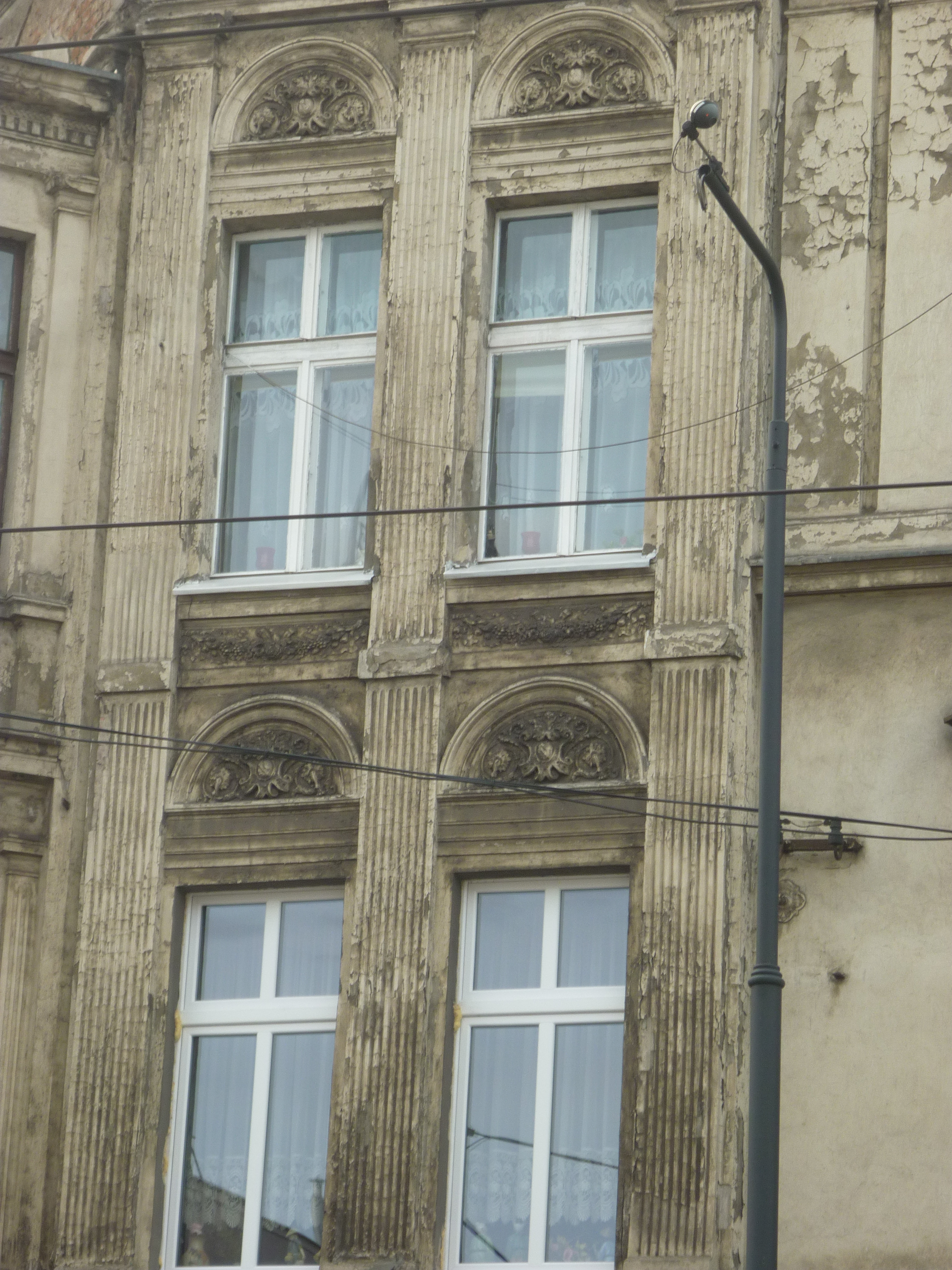
motifs detail

=== Tenement at 115 ===
1887 by Józef Święcicki and Anton Hoffmann

Eclecticism, Neo-classicism.

Initial address was Danzigerstraße 65, the first landlord was a butcher, Johann Bordanowicz. The butcher shop remained in use till the outbreak of World War I.

The facade reflects neo-classical features, with pediments over first level windows and a festoon above the avant-corps entry. The main gate is a work of wrought iron and glass.

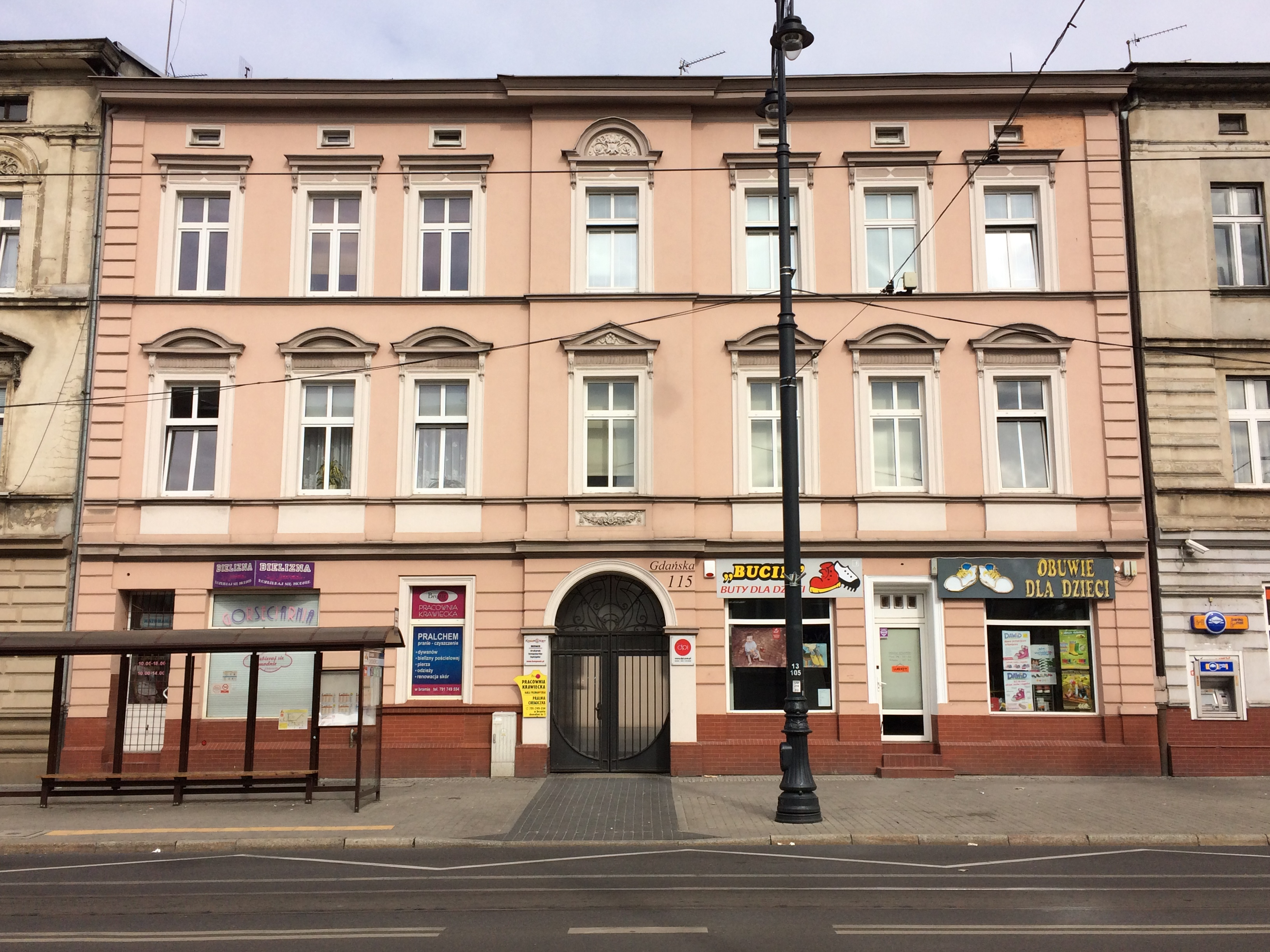
View of the frontage from the street

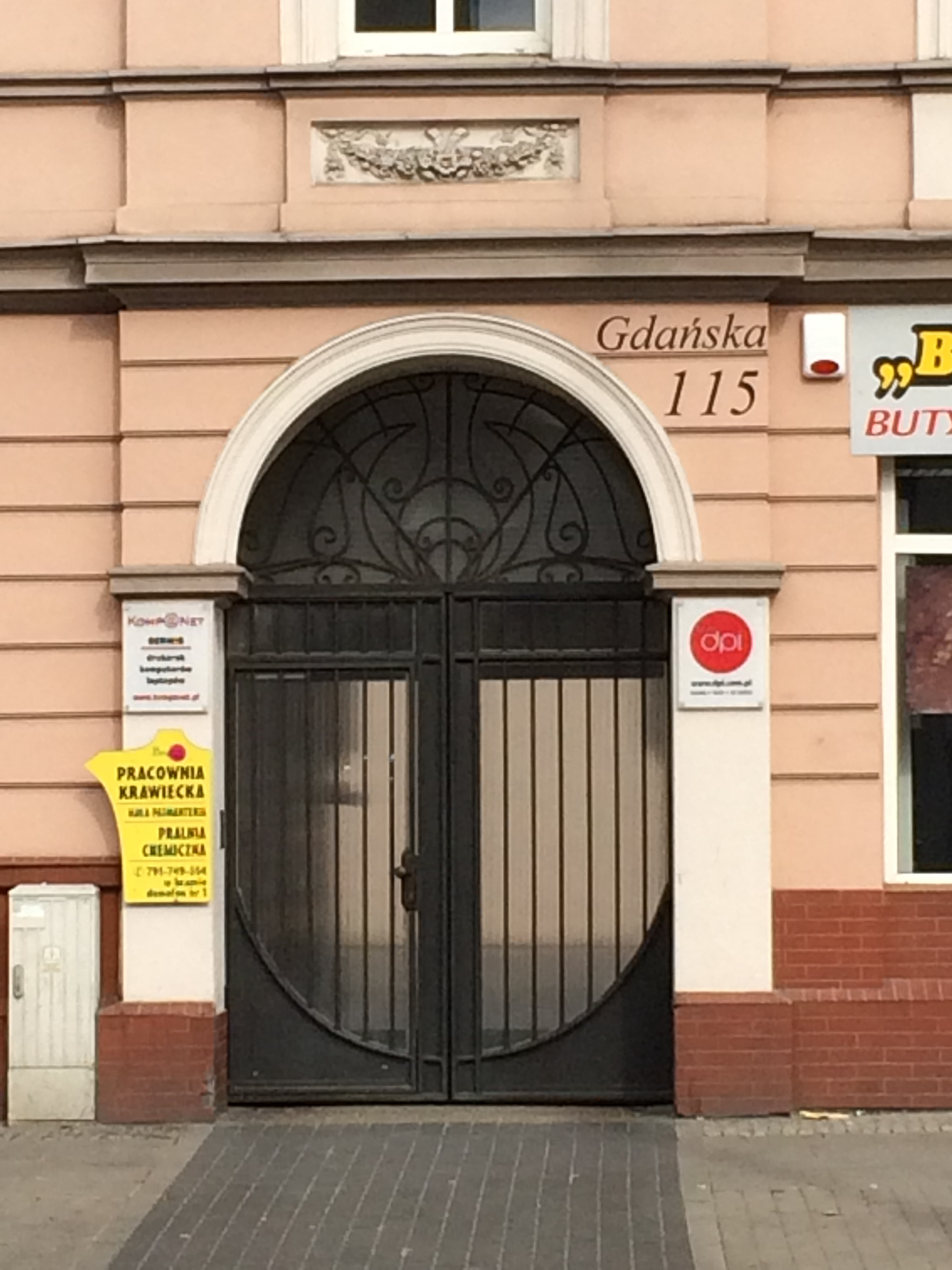
Main gate

=== Tenement at 117 ===
1889

Eclecticism, Neo-classicism.

Initial address was Danzigerstraße 66: the first owner was Hermann Kisser, a baker, who had his shop on the ground floor.

The facade, renovated in 2019, displays neo-classical features, in particular round pediments above the windows of the first floor.

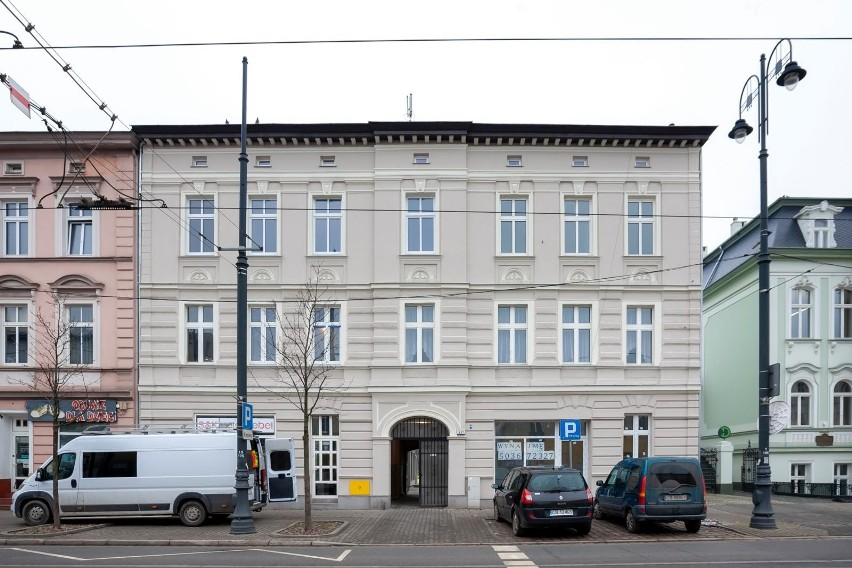
View of the frontage

=== Villa Fritz Heroldt, at 119 ===
Registered on Kuyavian-Pomeranian Voivodeship heritage list, Nr.A/11, October 12, 1999

1895–1896, by Fritz Weidner

Eclecticism & Neo-baroque

In the beginning of the 20th century, the Polish journalist and writer Antoni Chołoniewski (1872–1924) lived here.

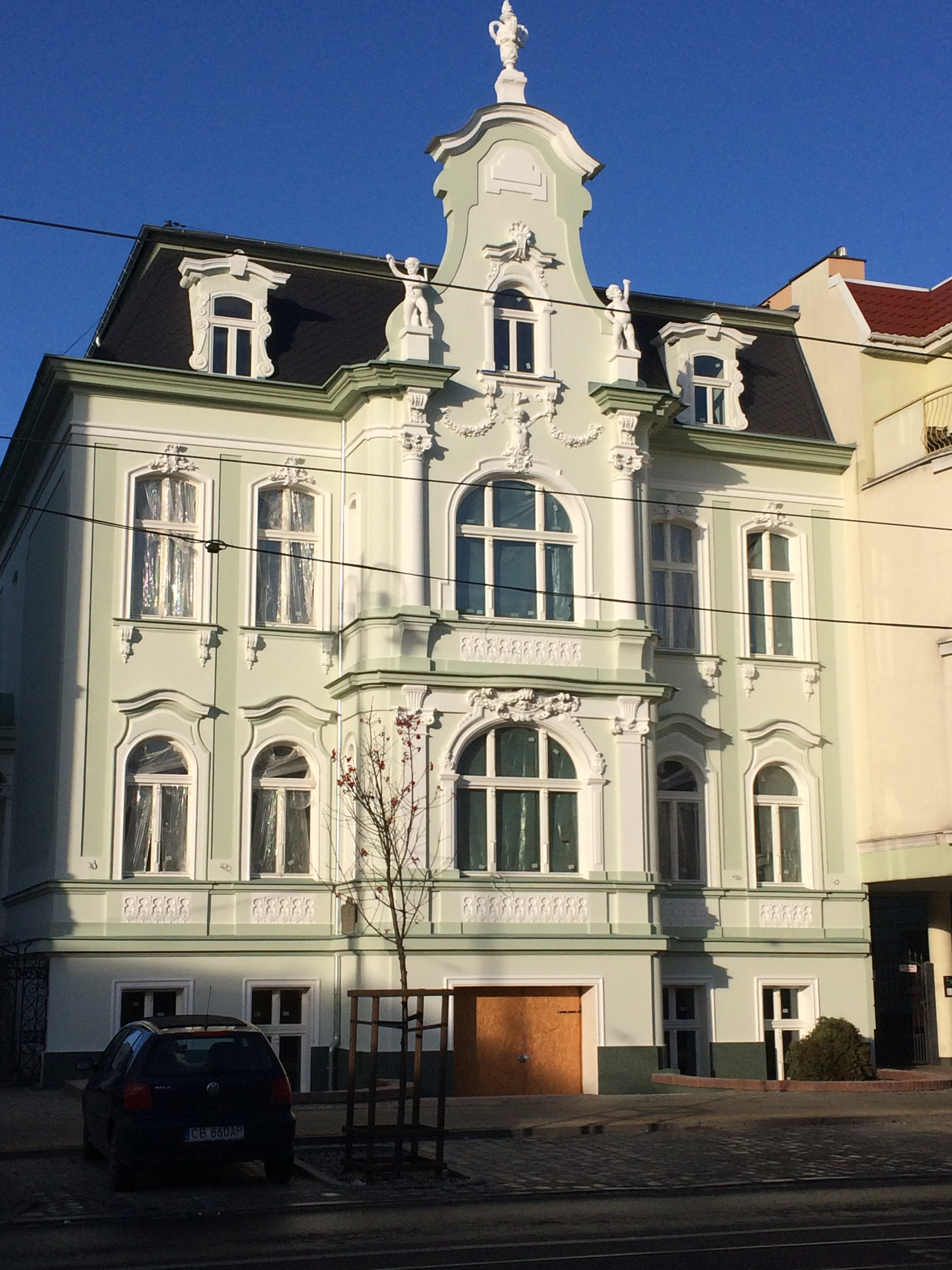
Main elevation

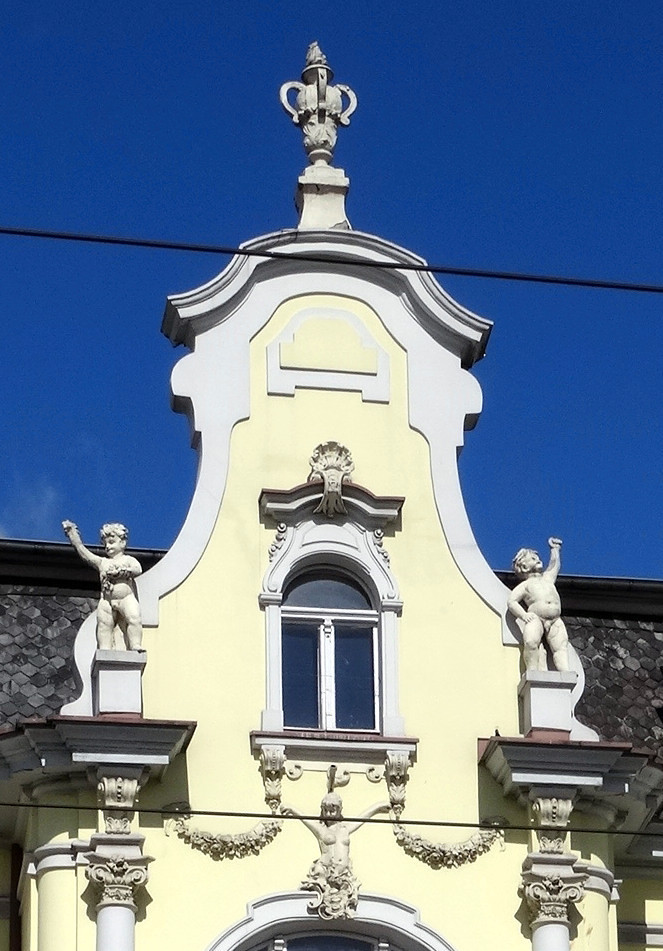
Top of the gable

=== Julius Kolander tenement, at 125 ===
1890, by Józef Święcicki

Modern architecture

The original building at Danzigerstraße 70, now gone, was commissioned by Julius Kolander, a baker, to Józef Święcicki. The Neo-baroque tenement included two wings and a stable. The current edifice has been completed in 1996, with a modern style attempting to recall Art Nouveau buildings.

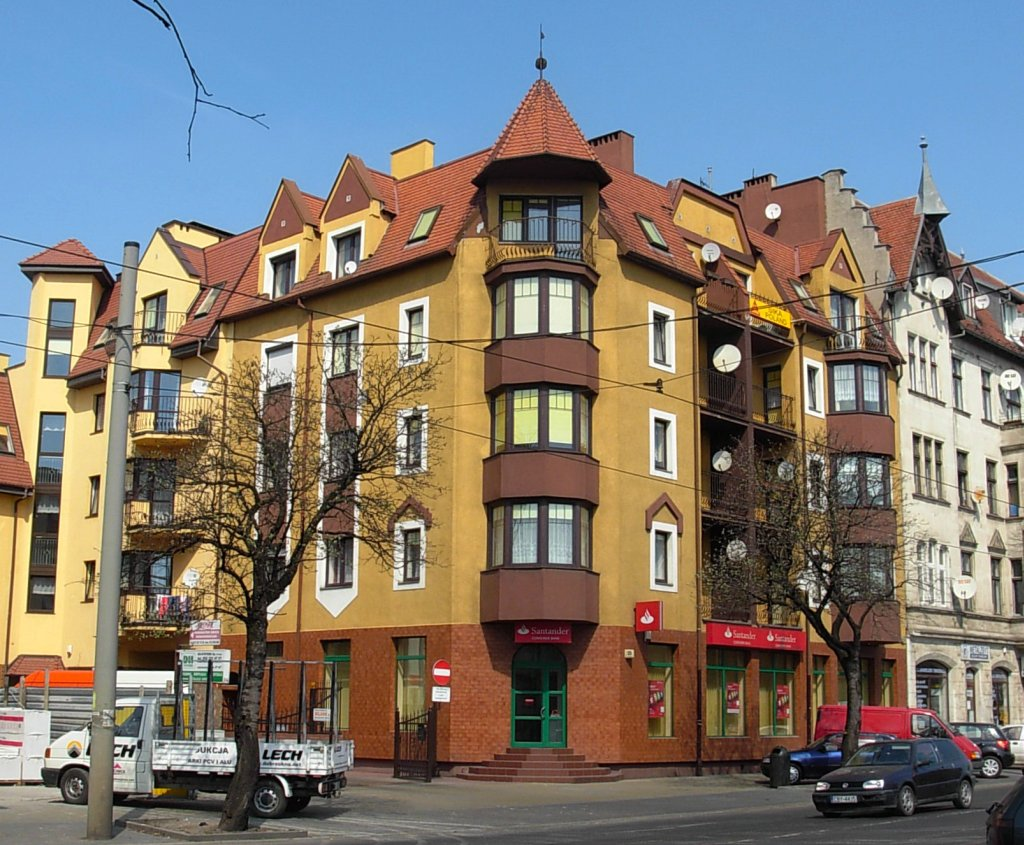
View of both frontages

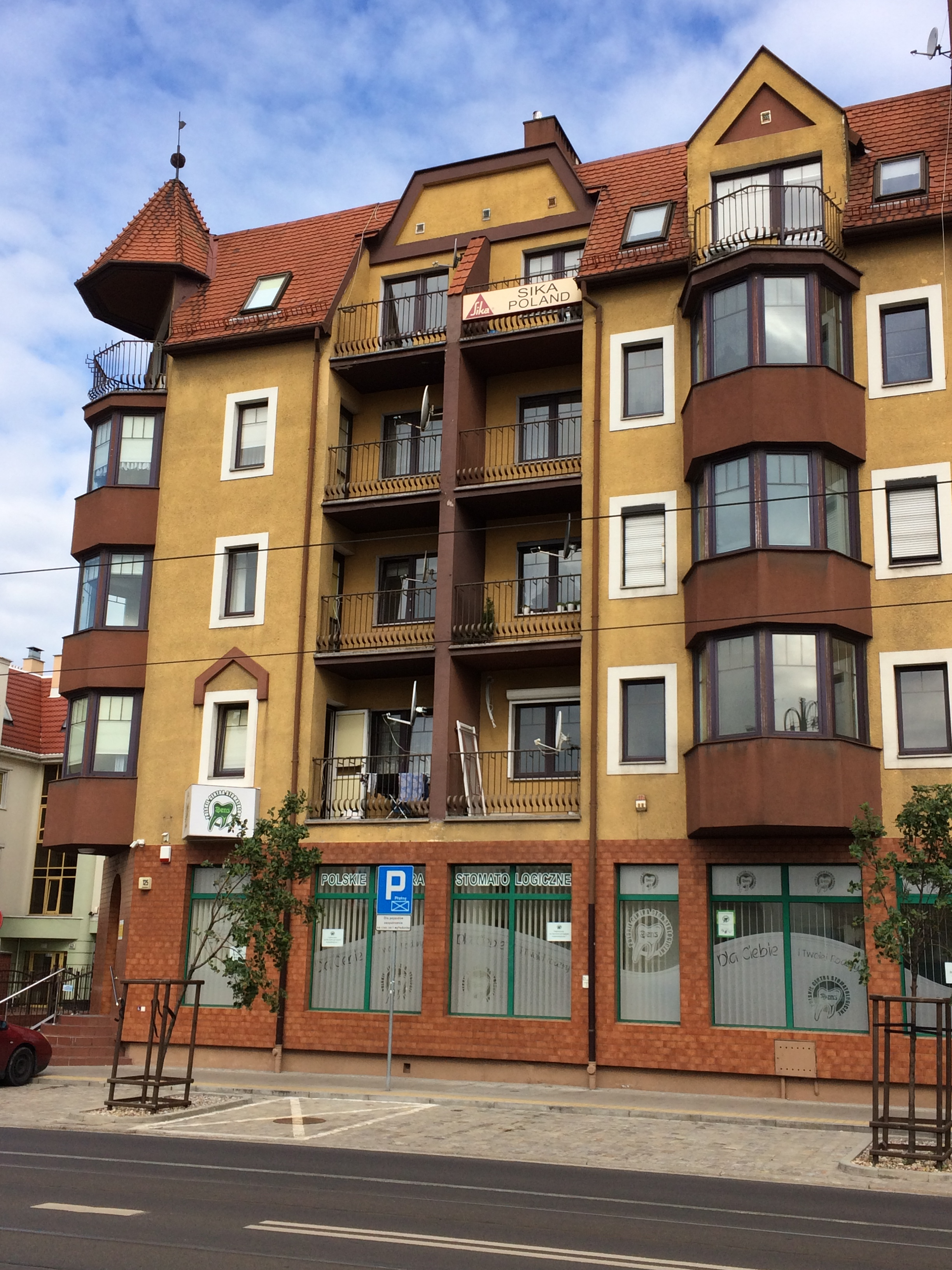
Facade on Gdańsk Street

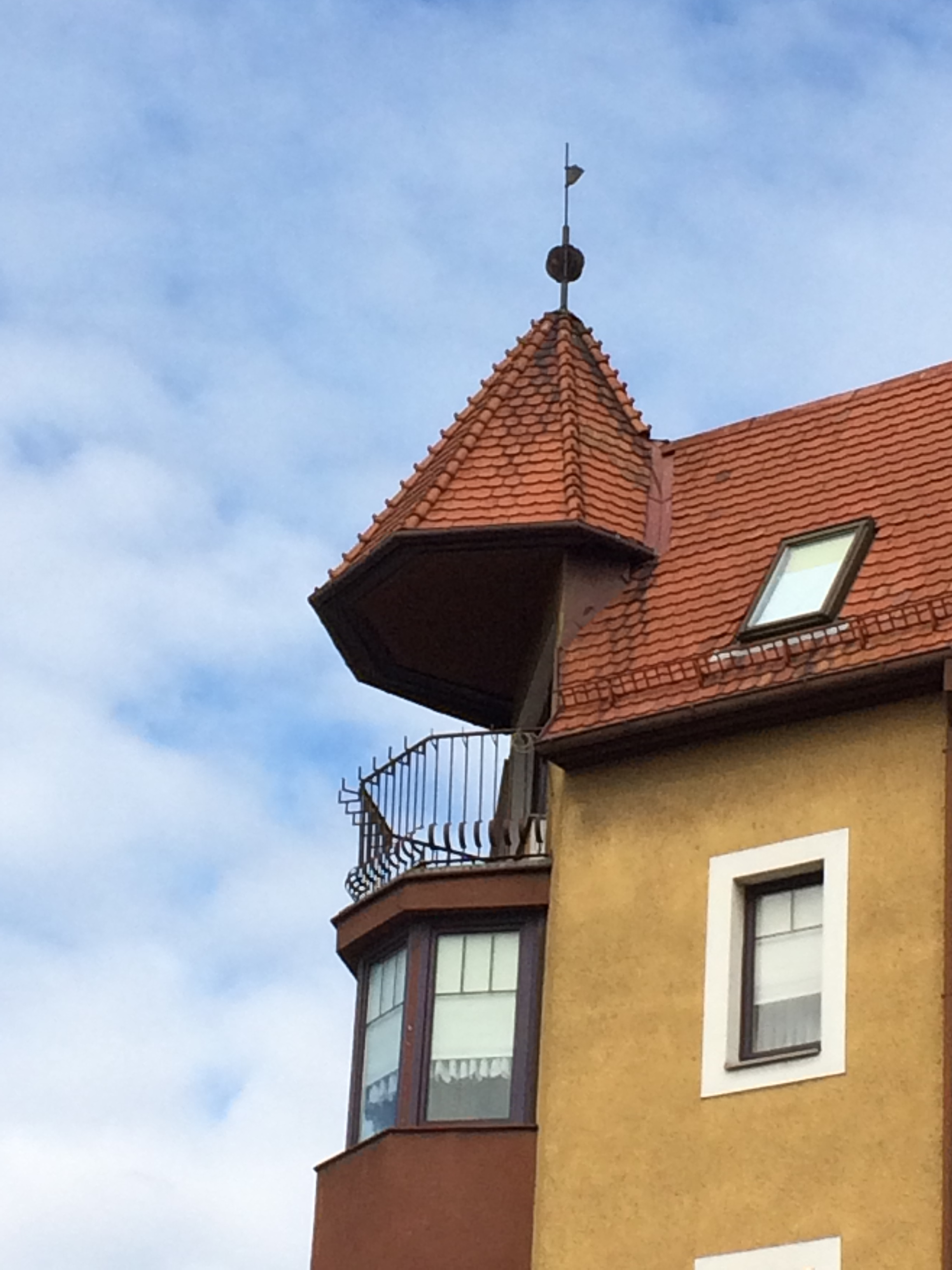
Detail of a corner balcony

=== Kazimierz Figurski tenement, at 127 ===
1900-1901

German Historicism

The shop on the ground floor displays a preserved decorative cast-iron column, part of the original design of Kasimir Figurski, merchant and innkeeper. The building bears the characteristics of picturesque architecture. Above the main entrance is placed a head of a young woman with stylish and abundant hair. Roof tops of the facade are decorated with openwork wooden structure.

The building has been restored in 2021.

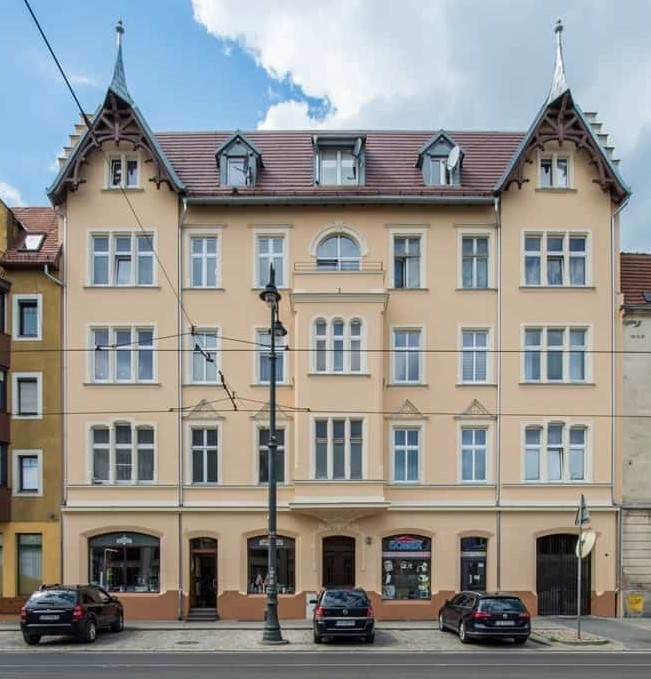
Main frontage

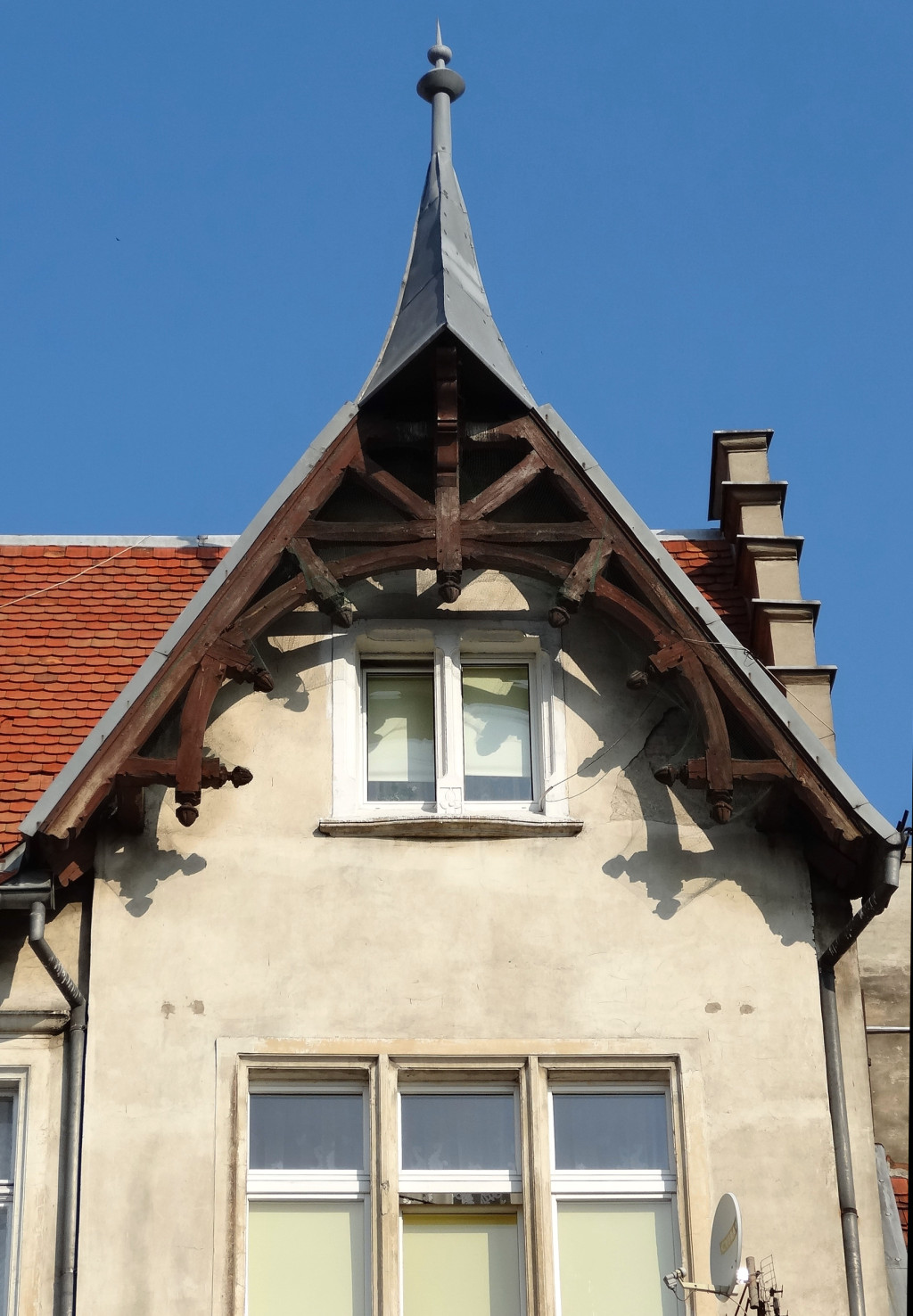
Peak wooden structure

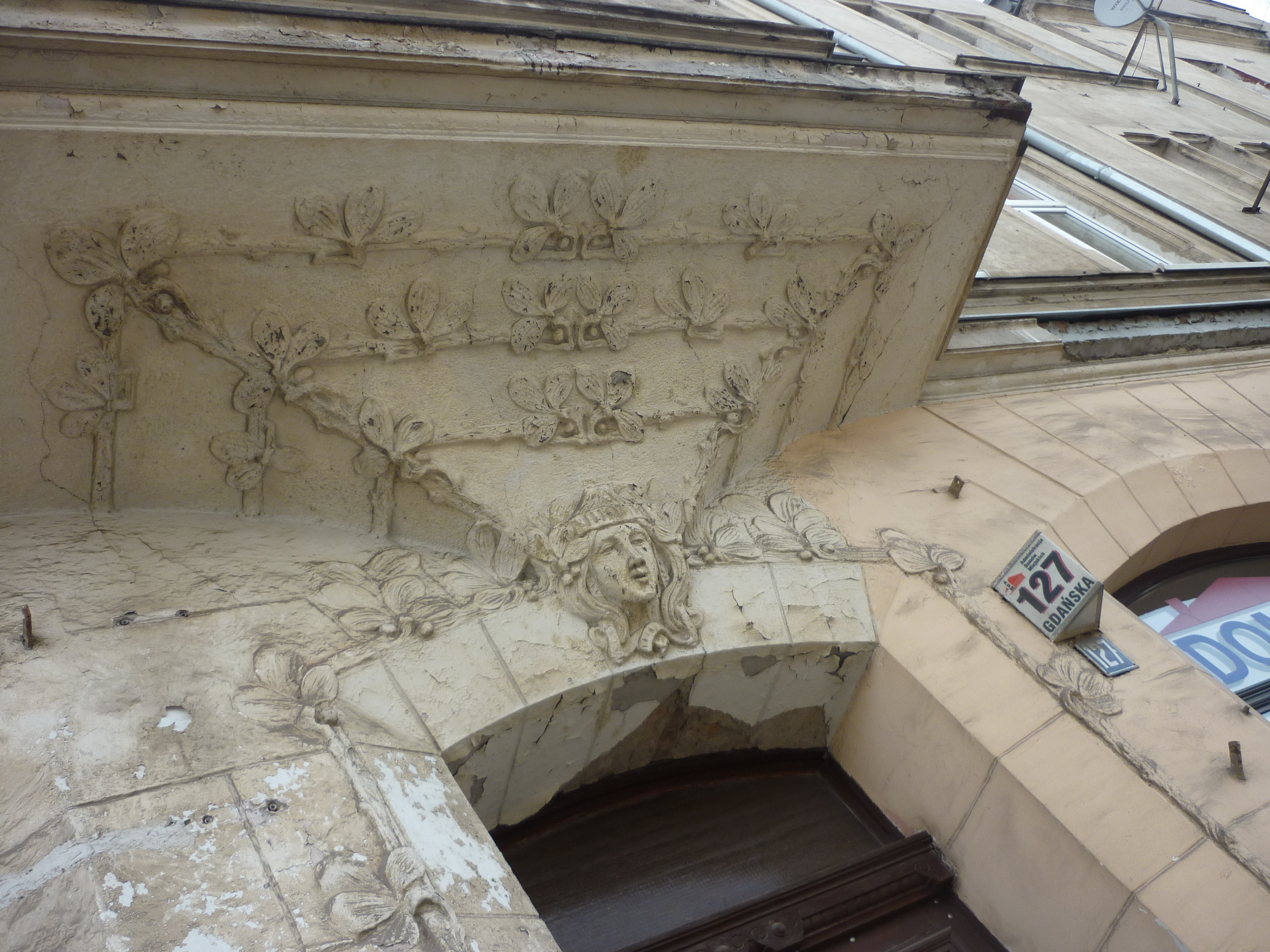
Gate decoration

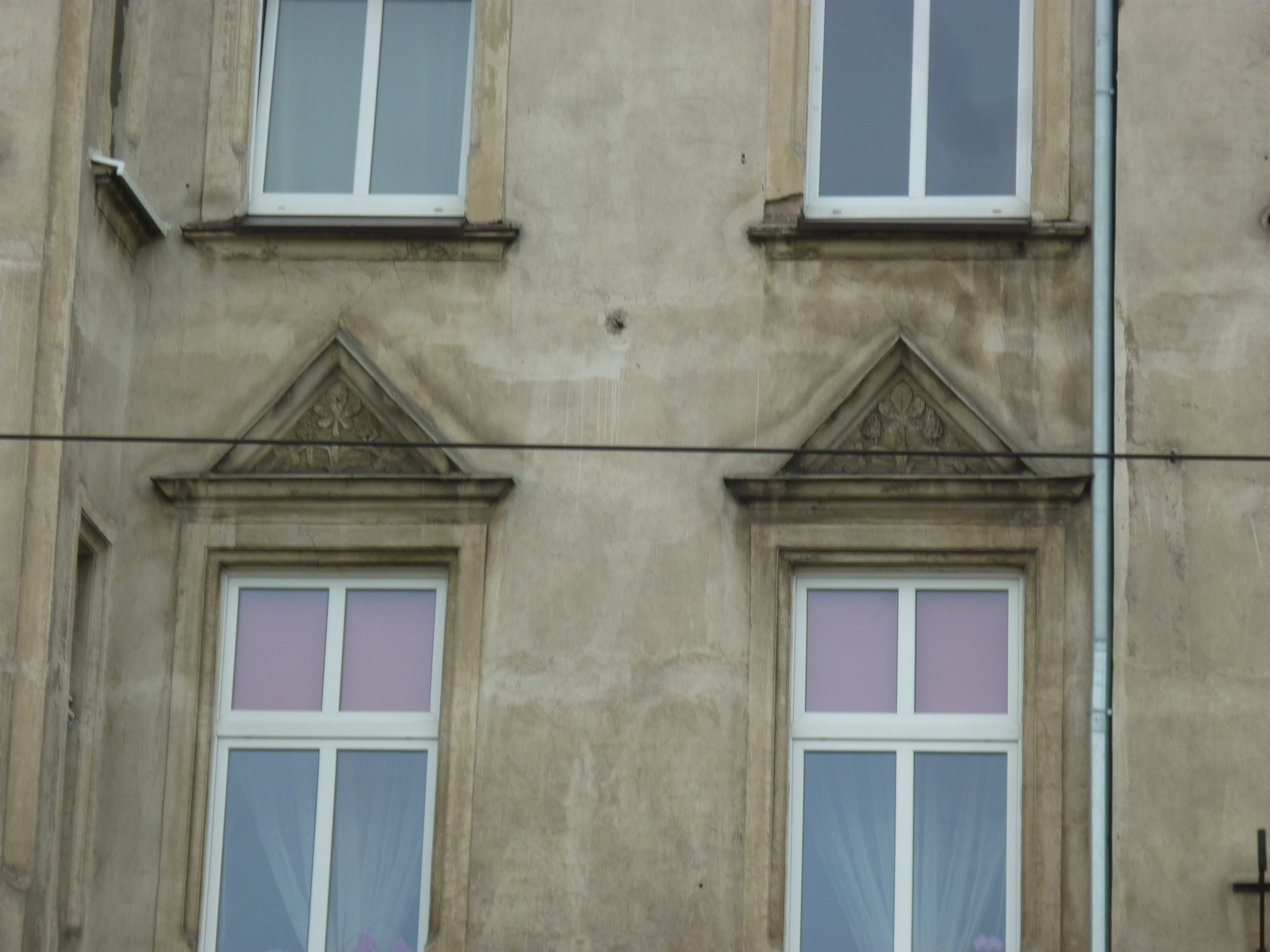
Pediment on windows

=== Ernst Friebel tenement, at 130 ===
1911, by Karl Gehrke

Modern architecture

The house was built on a commission from Ernst Friebel.

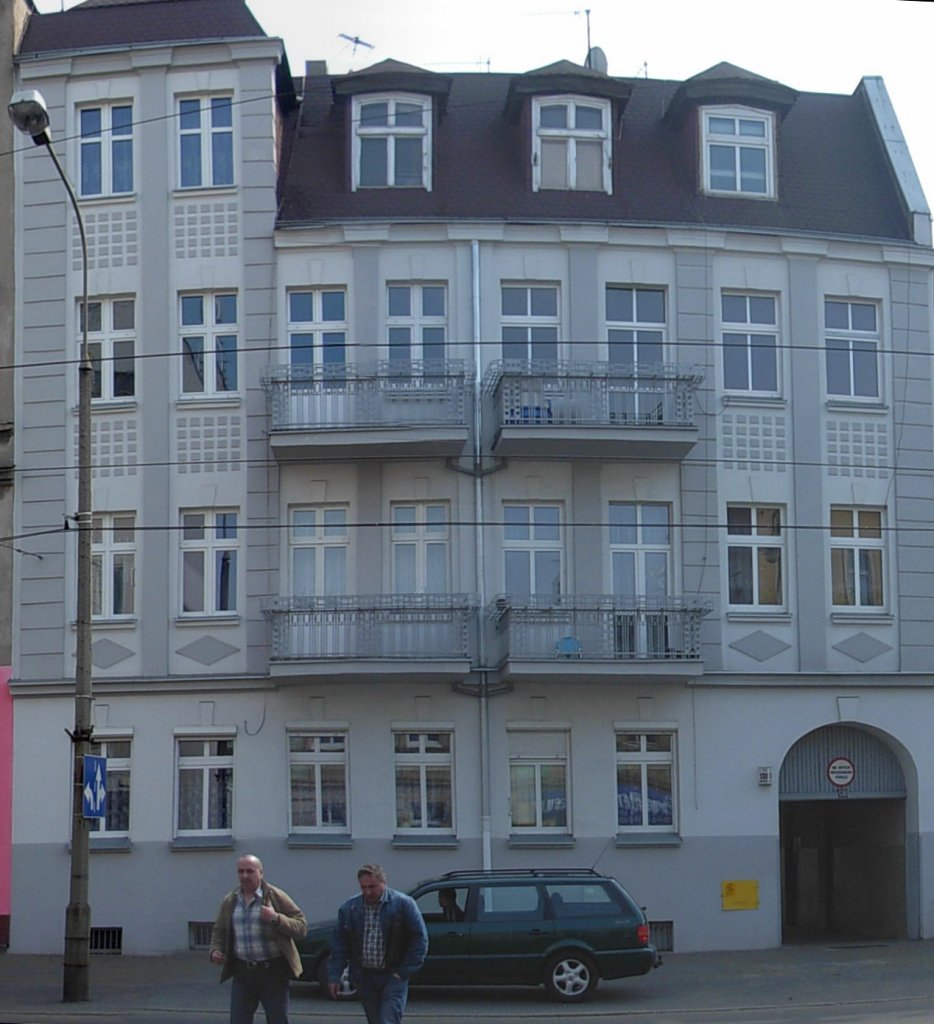
Main elevation

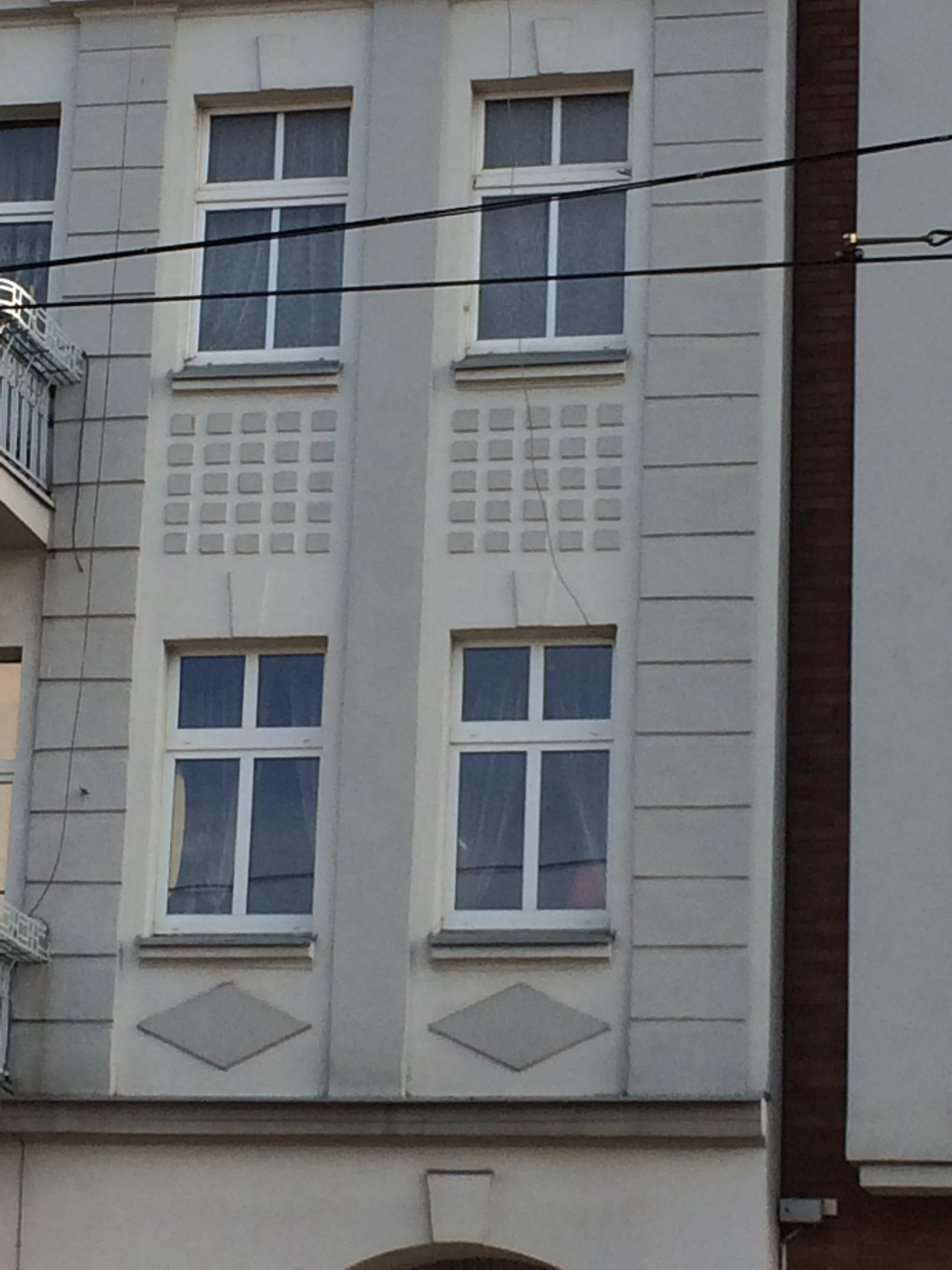
Facade details

=== Tenement at 131 ===
1890s

Eclecticism

August Käding, a railway switchman was the first landlord.

One can highlight the triangular tympanum above the entrance, adorned with vegetal plaster motifs.

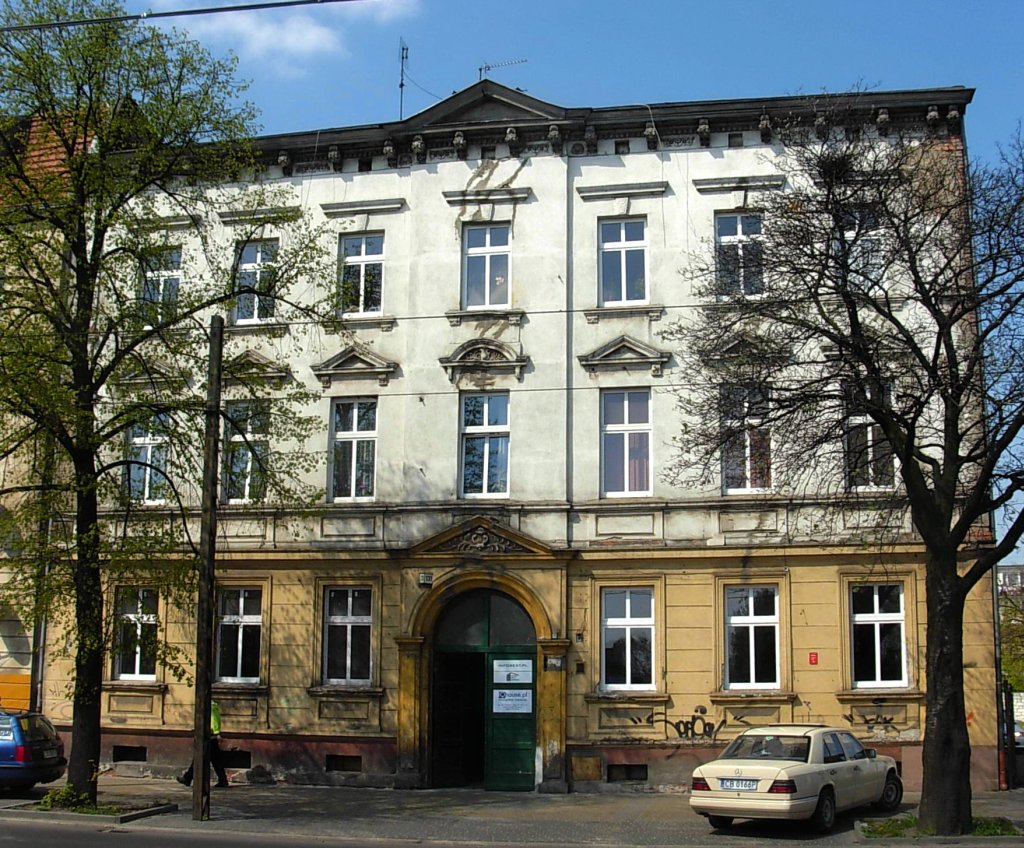
Main elevation

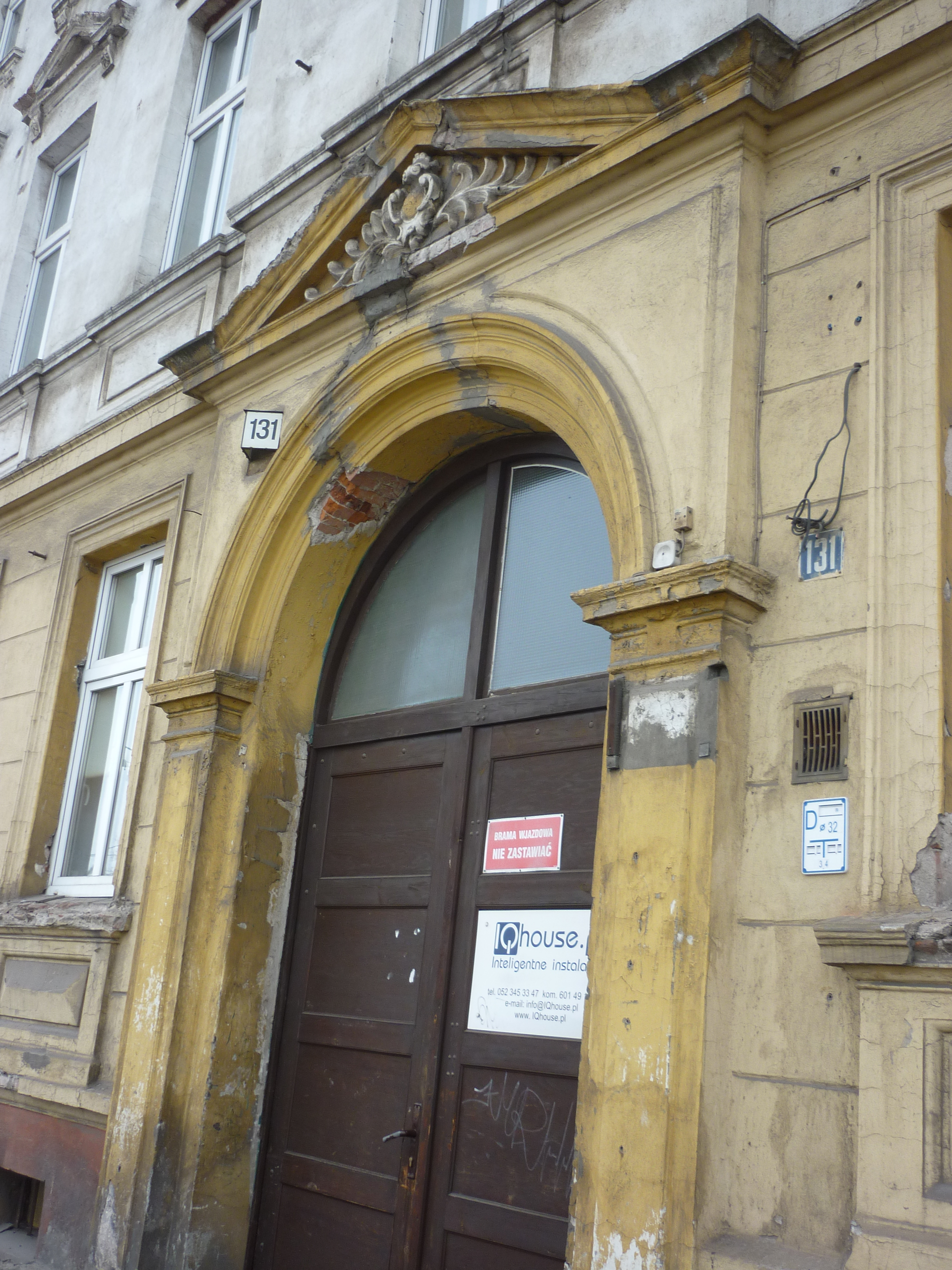
Main gate

=== Tenement at 135 ===
1893, by Carl Rose

Modern architecture

First owner was a cabdriver, Wincent Swirski. Above the main entrance is placed a stylized head of a woman. A major overhaul took place in 2000.

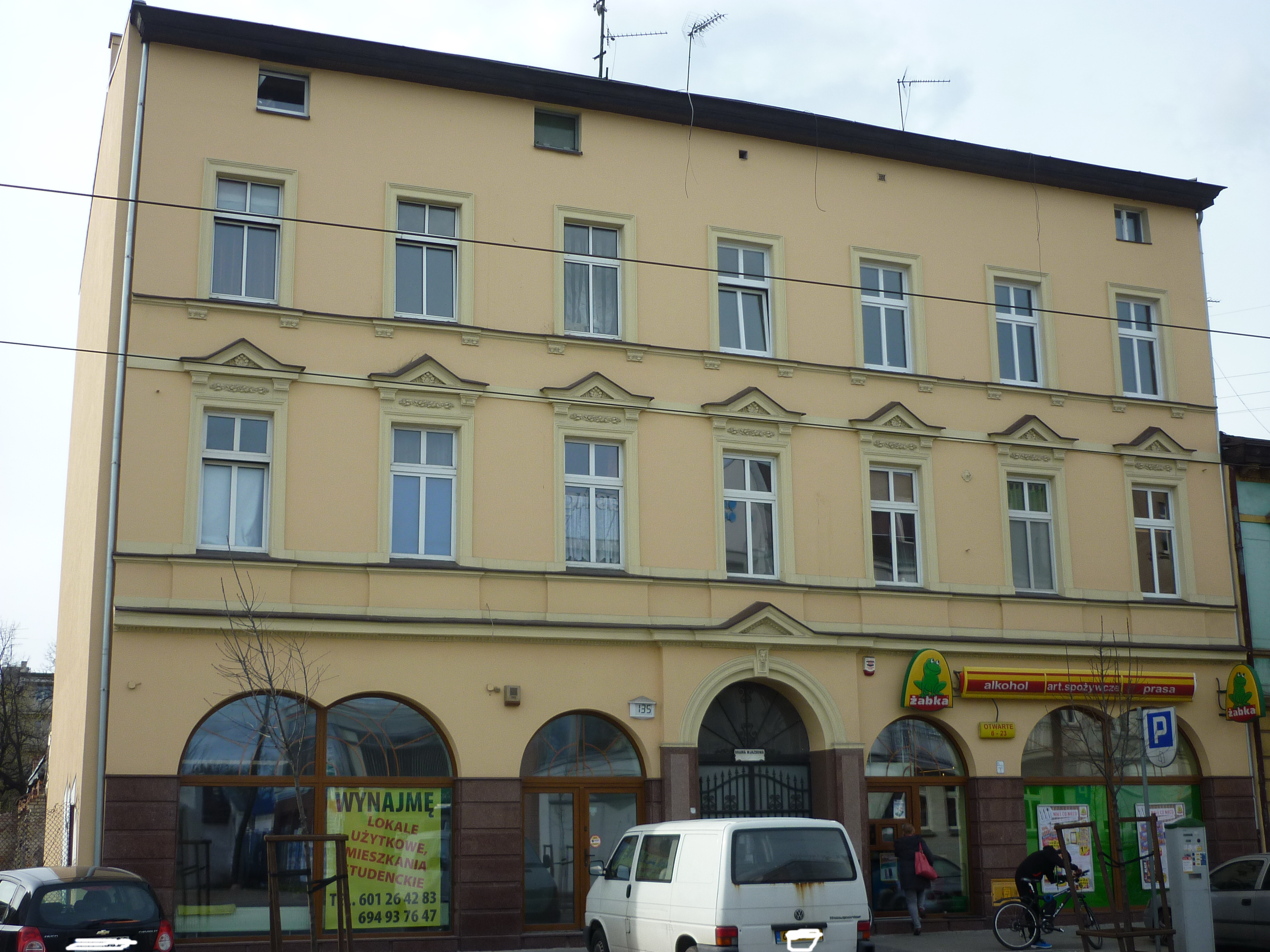
Facade from Gdańska Street

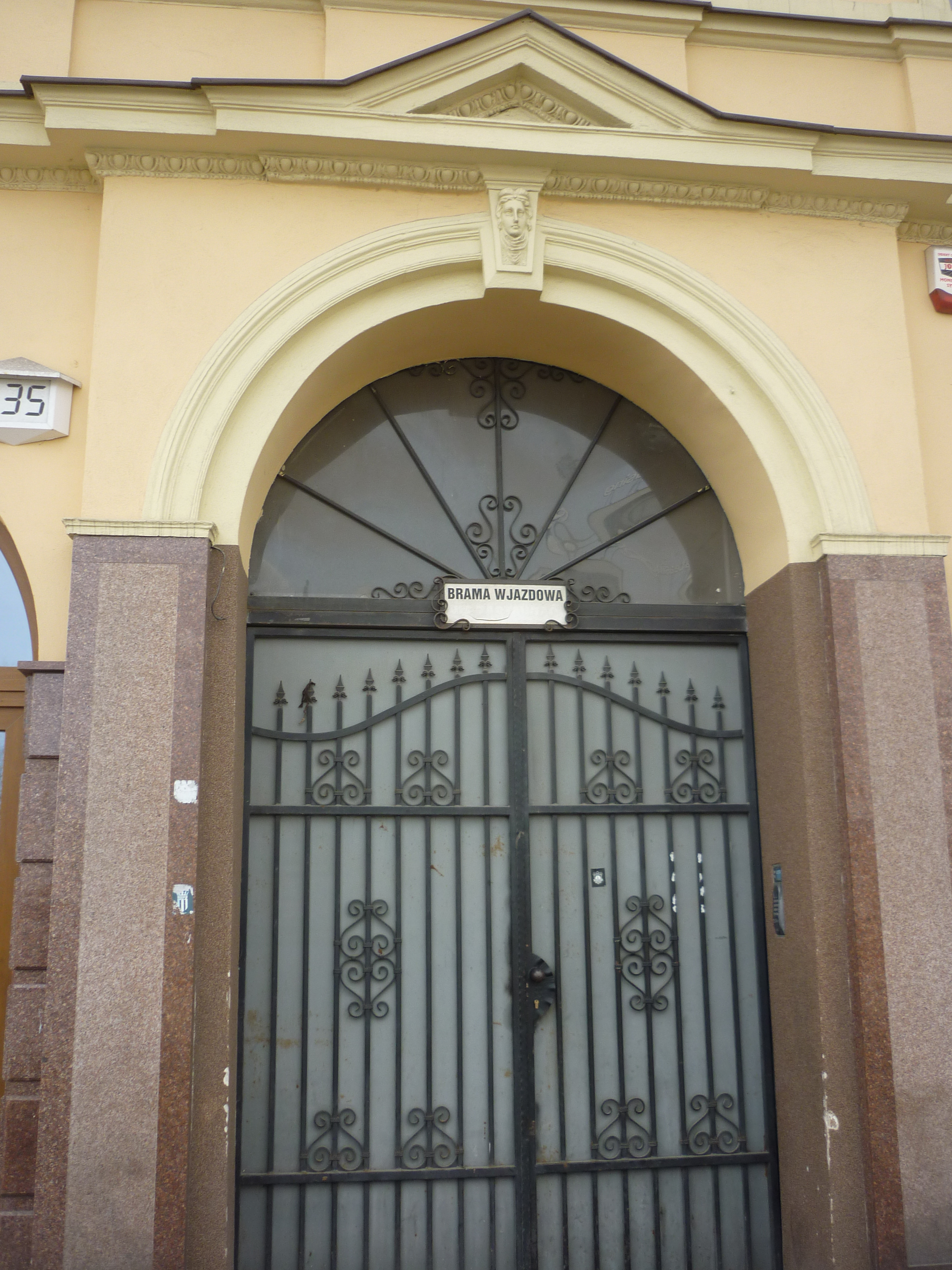
Gate detail

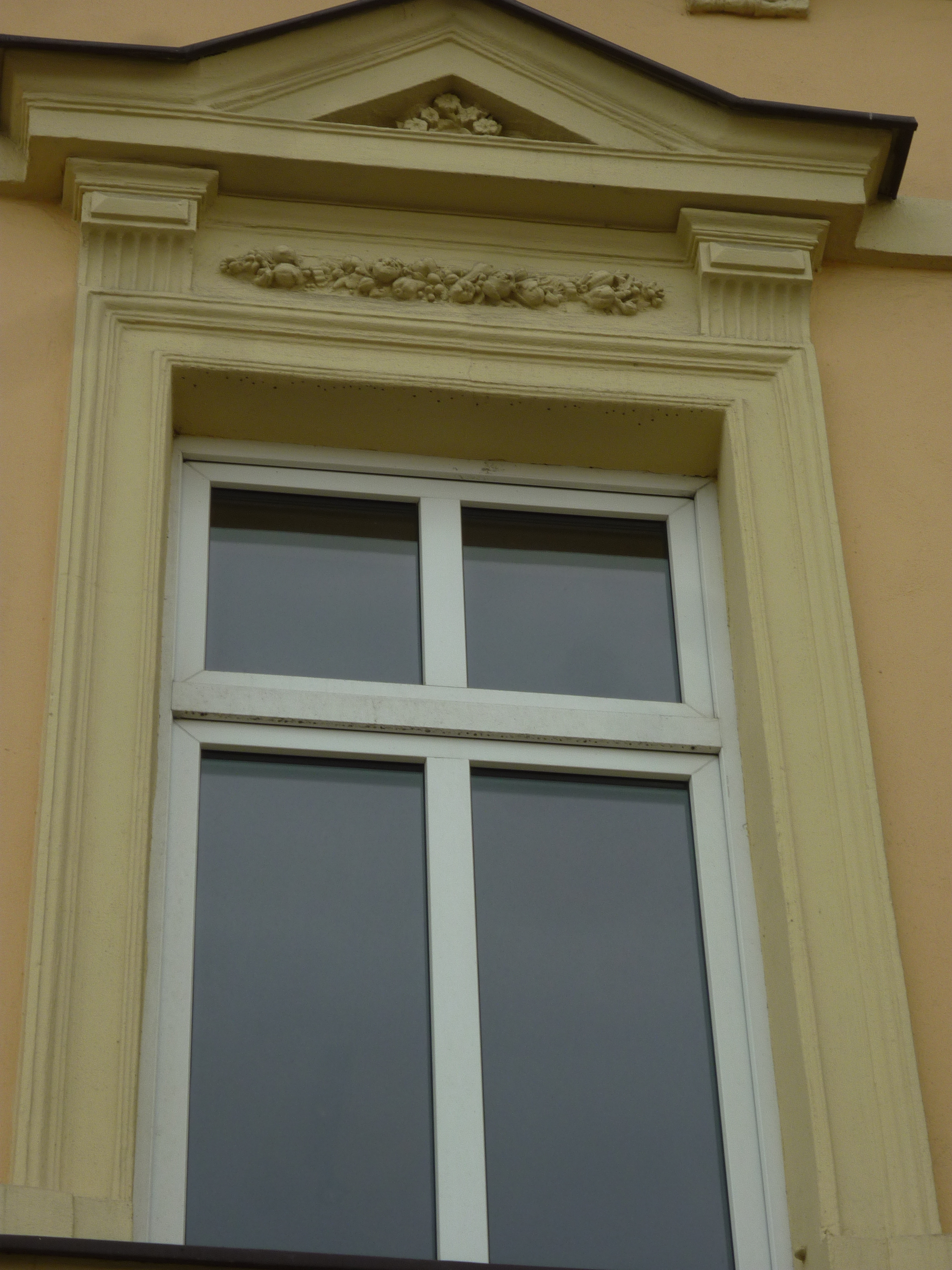
Window pediment motifs

=== Tenement at 137 ===
1886 by Józef Święcicki and Anton Hoffmann

Eclecticism & Neo-Renaissance

First owner of this house at then Danzigerstraße 71 was Gustav Stiehlau, restaurateur and locksmith. In 1900, the property moved to Kasimir Figurski, a merchant and owner of the tenement at Nr.127. The low edifice sets off from the surrounding tenement. However, its decoration is worth noticing by the richness of the delicate ornaments of pediments and cartouches.

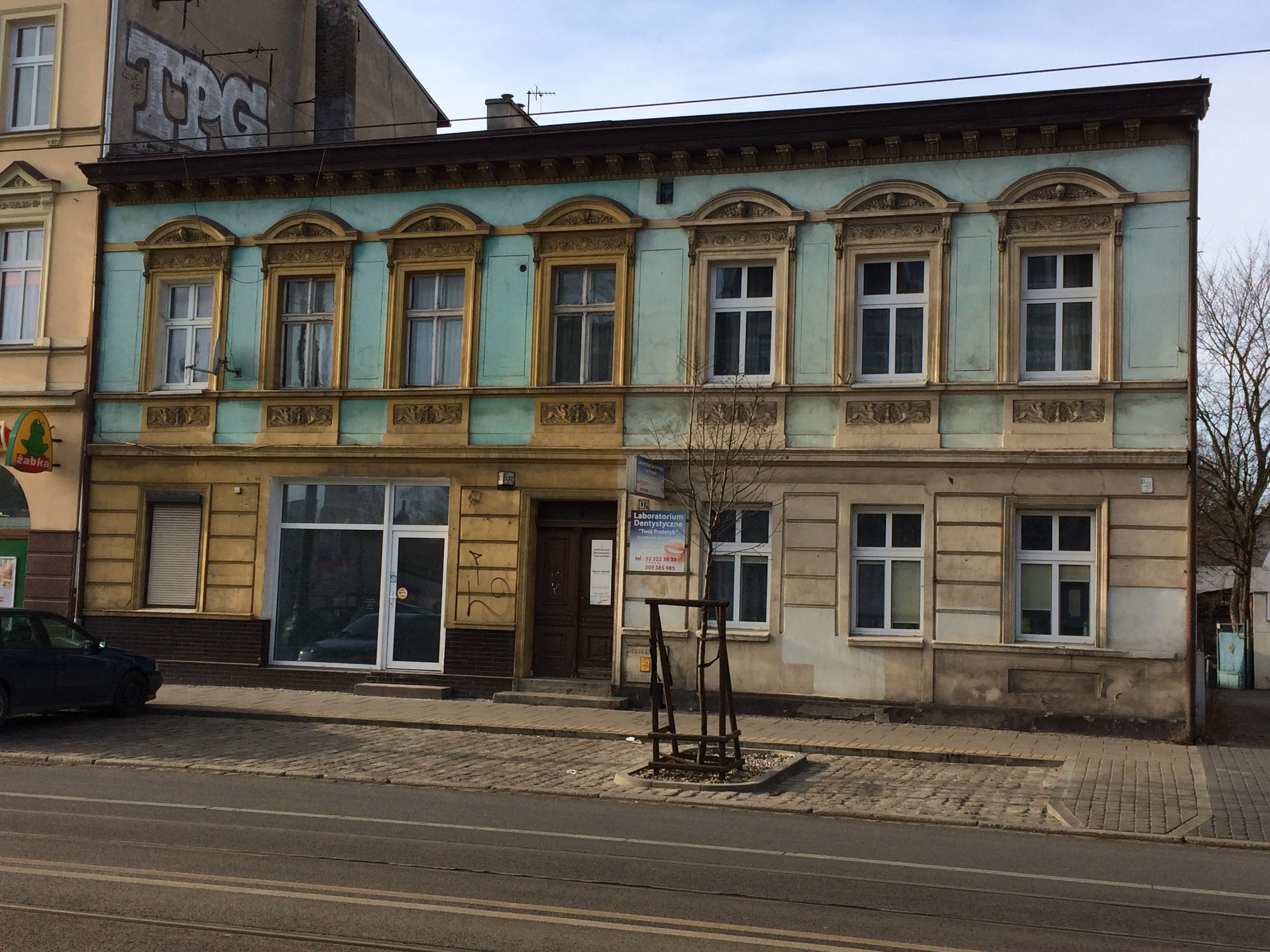
Main elevation

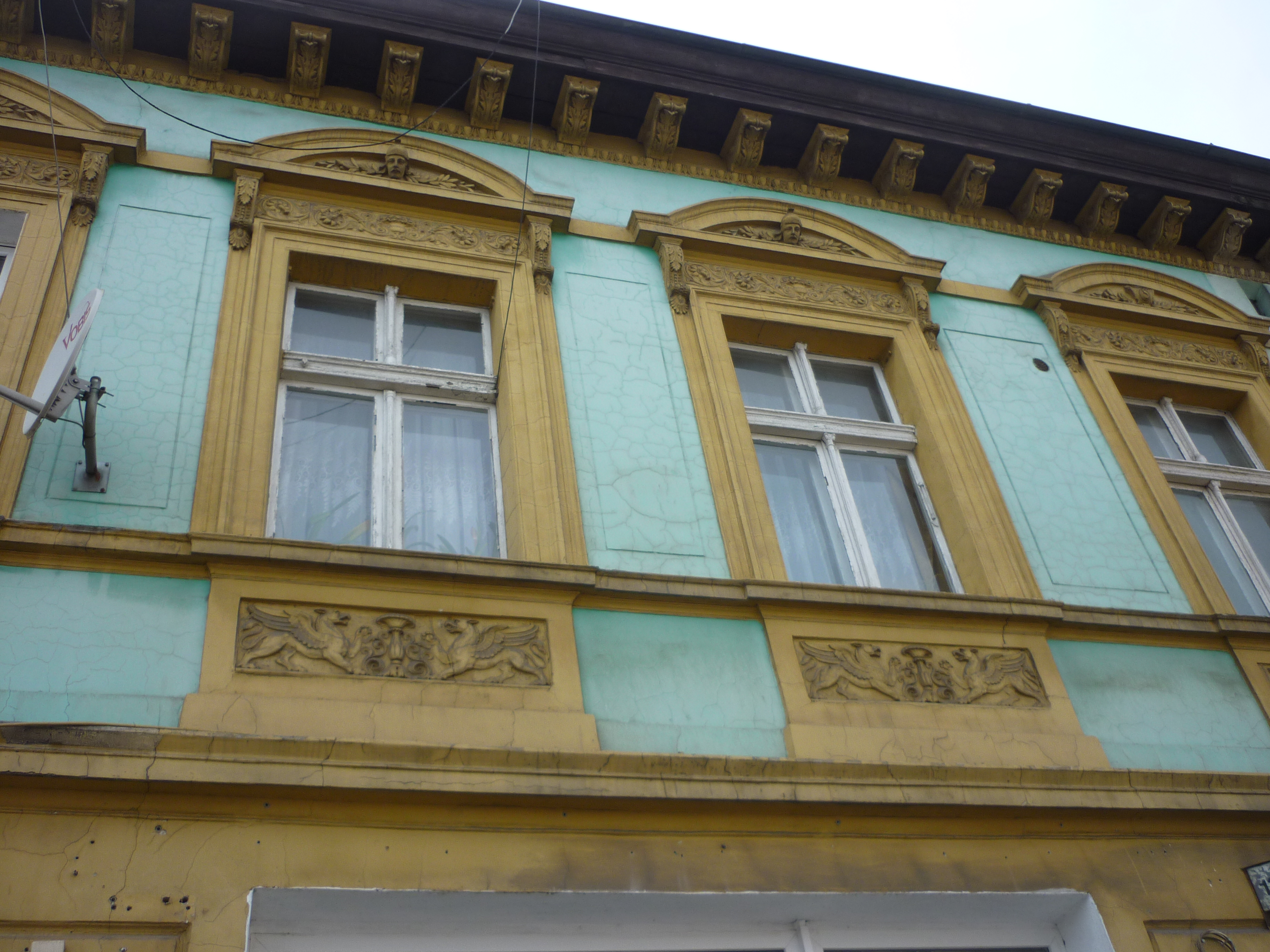
Detail of window pediments and cartouches

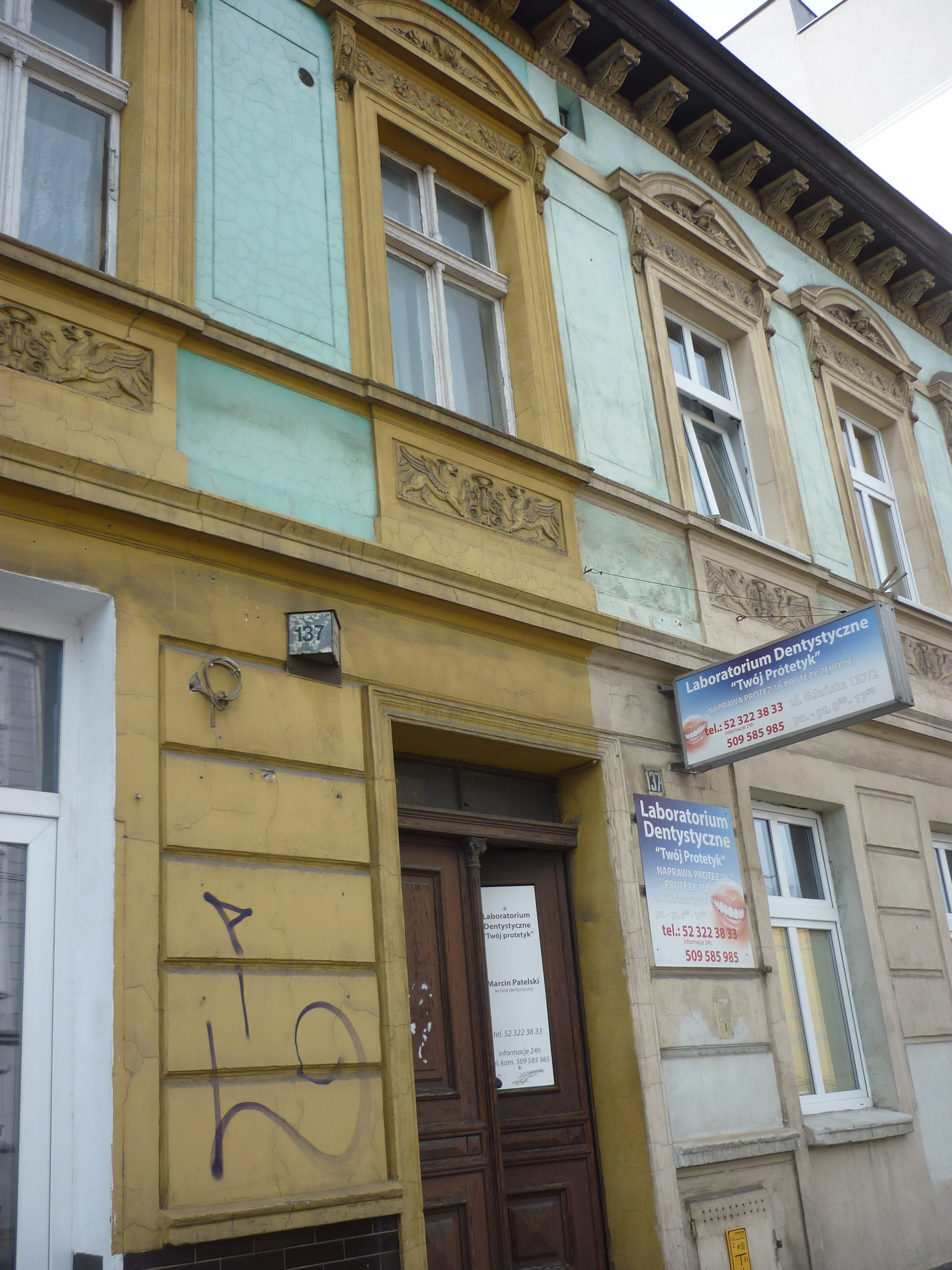
Gate view

=== Georg Weiss tenement, at 141 ===
1906–1907, by Georg Weiss

Modern architecture

It was the second personal house of George Weiss, a master mason, after the one he built at 10 Libelta Street.

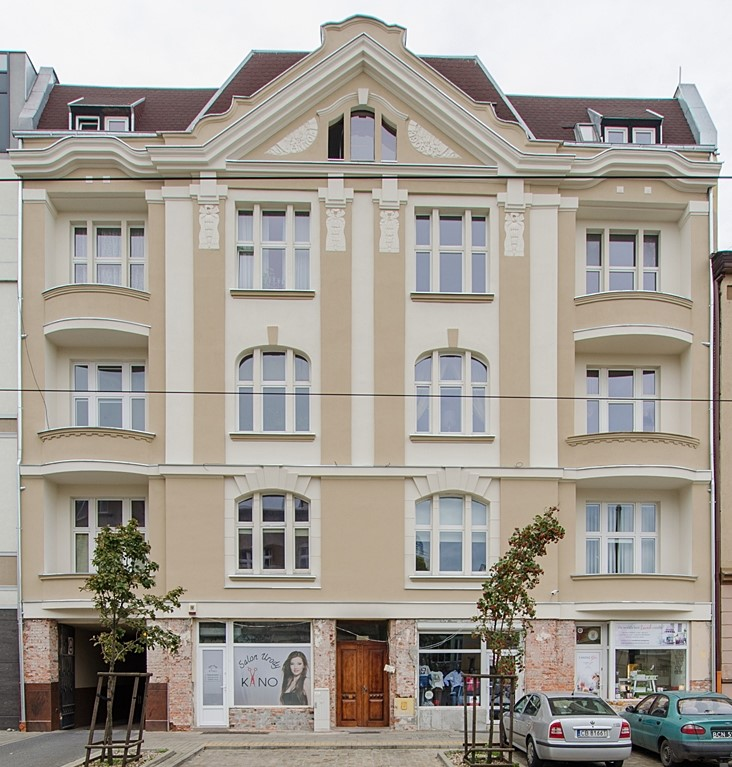
Main elevation

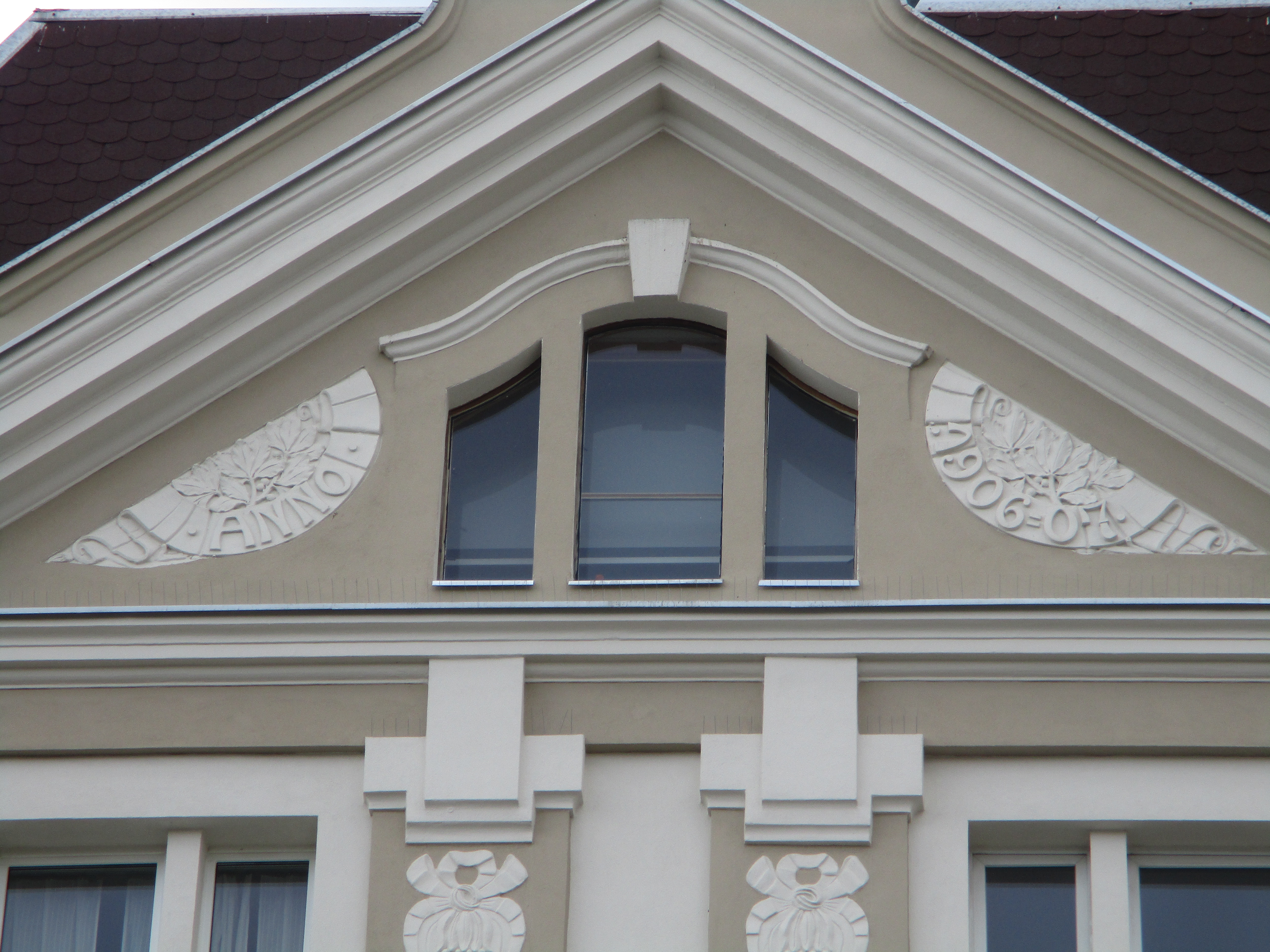
Detail of the gable pediment

=== Tenement at 144 ===
1890s

Eclecticism

The tenement has been entirely renovated in 2017 by the firm "Moderator".

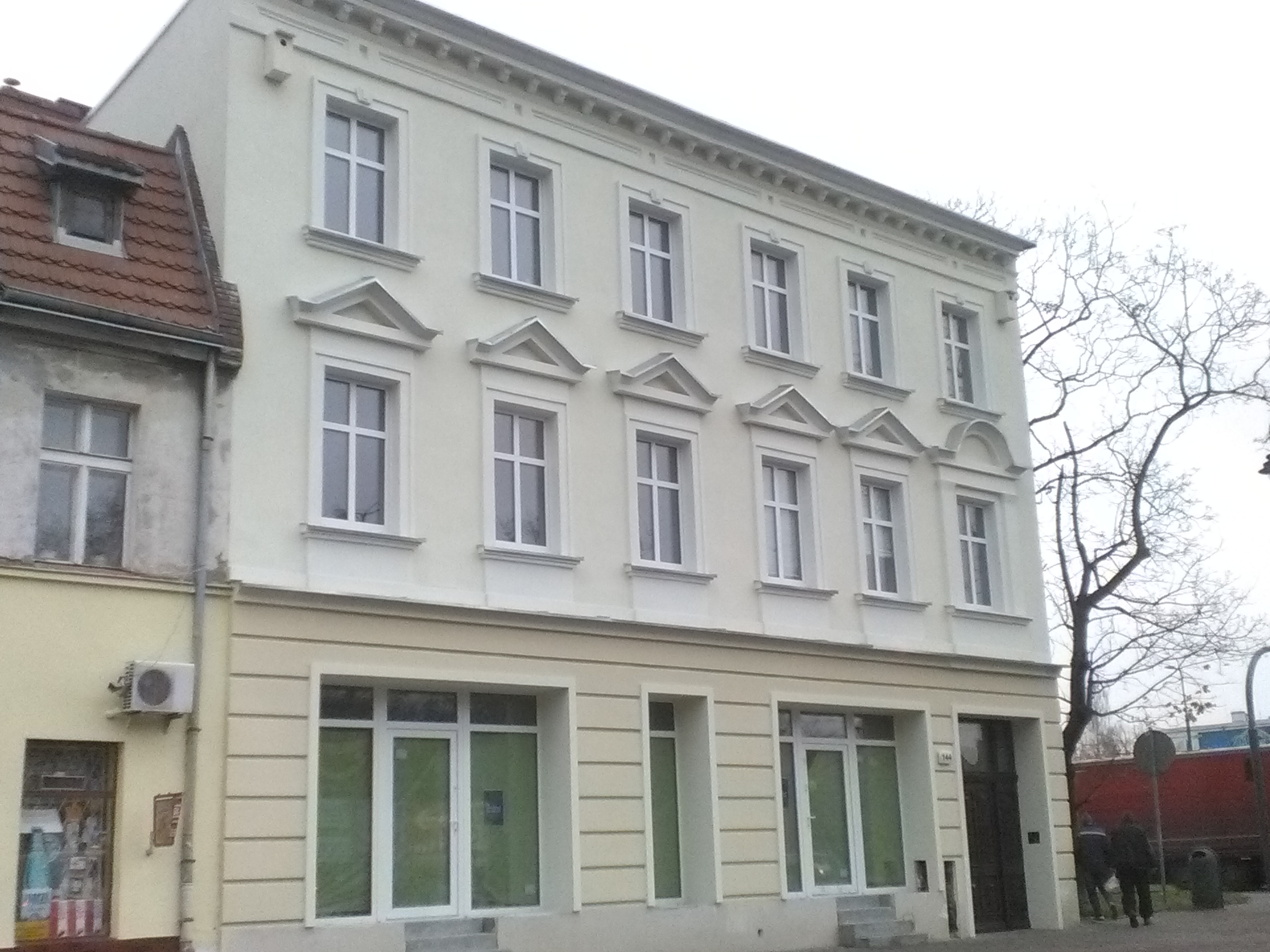
Main elevation

=== Military barracks, at 147 ===
1884–1914

Timber framing

Approximatively 40 barrack buildings were built on the compound.

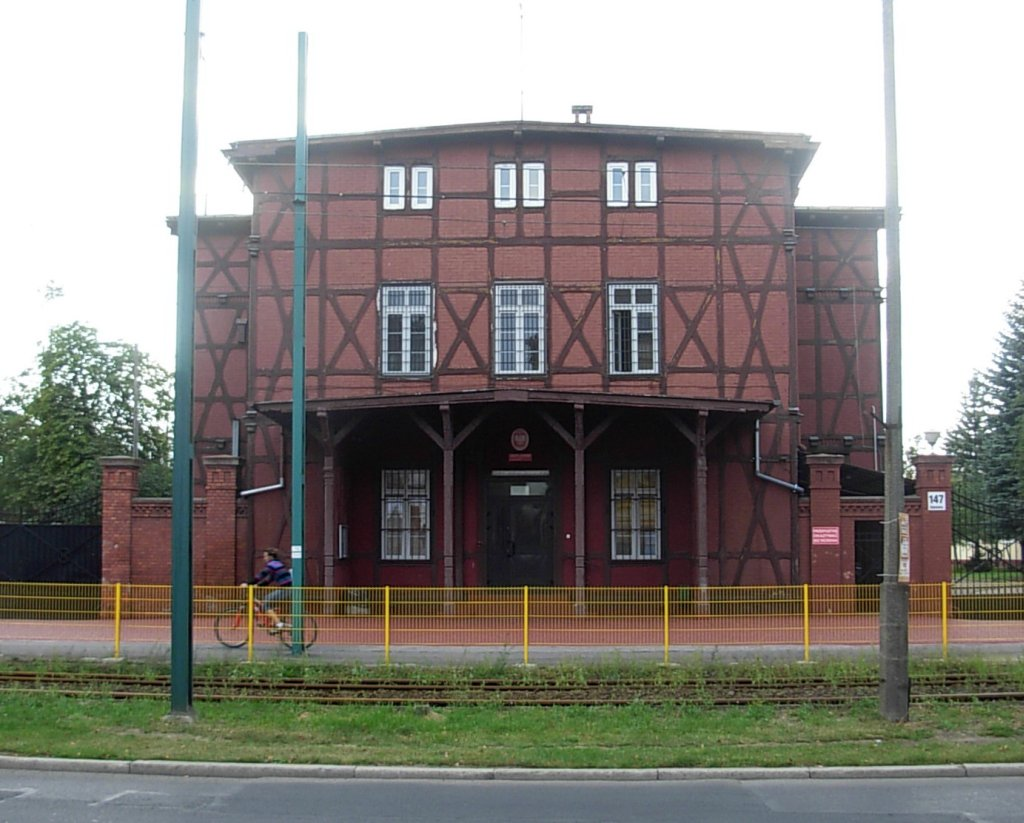
Military Barrack

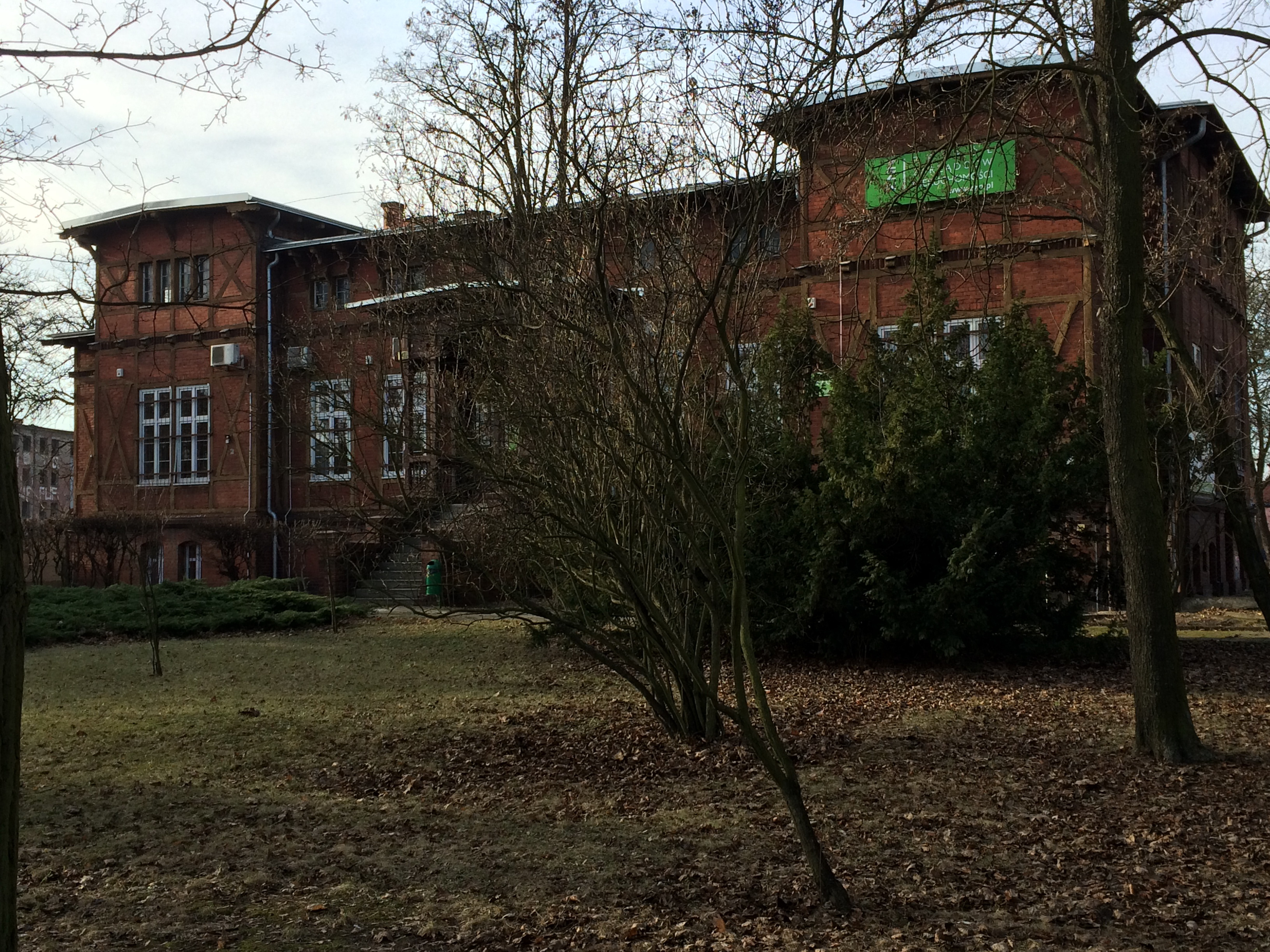
View of the first barrack from the street

=== Former Officer's Mess 53, at 160 ===
1880

Historicism.

The house, initially at Danzigerstraße 89 had as first landlord Paul Firch, listed as worker. At the end of the 19th century, it was the property of Albin Cohnfeld, a rentier, living at Dworcowa Street Nr.77. In 1906, it was used as an Officer's Mess (German: Offizier Kasino 53) till 1918 and the recreation of an independent Polish state. It then became the Polish Officer's Mess (Polish: Kasyno oficerskie) until World War II.

After a thorough renovation, it is now the seat of a Polish video games company, "Vivid Game" This historicist house, now refurbished, reflects beautiful brick details. Most impressive are the crow-stepped gables.

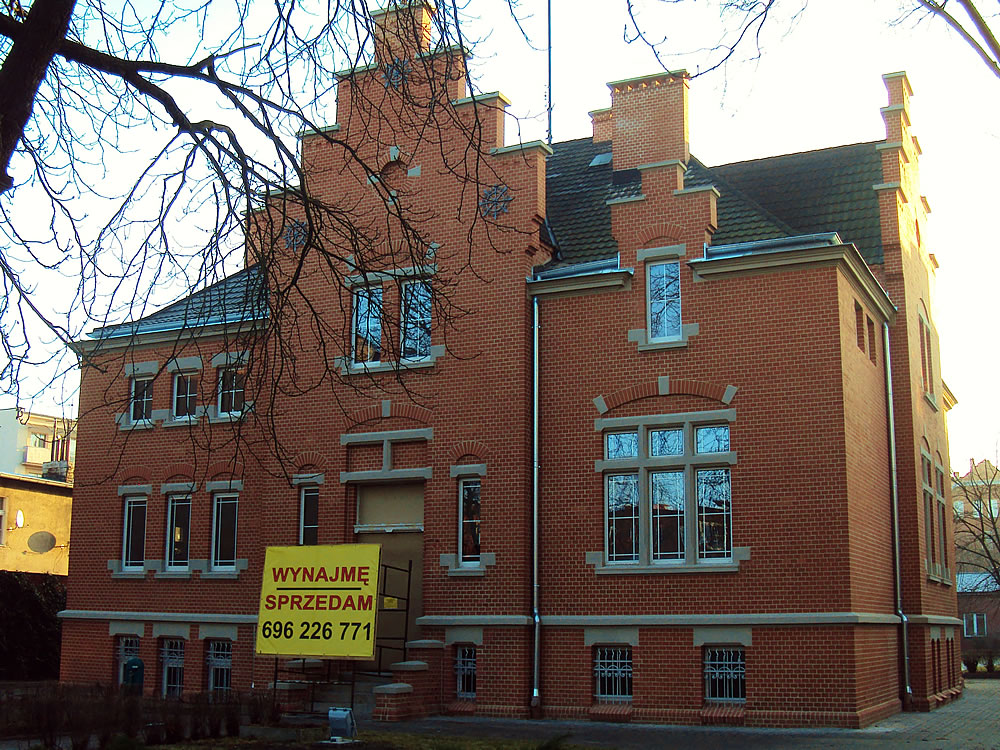
The building just after renovation

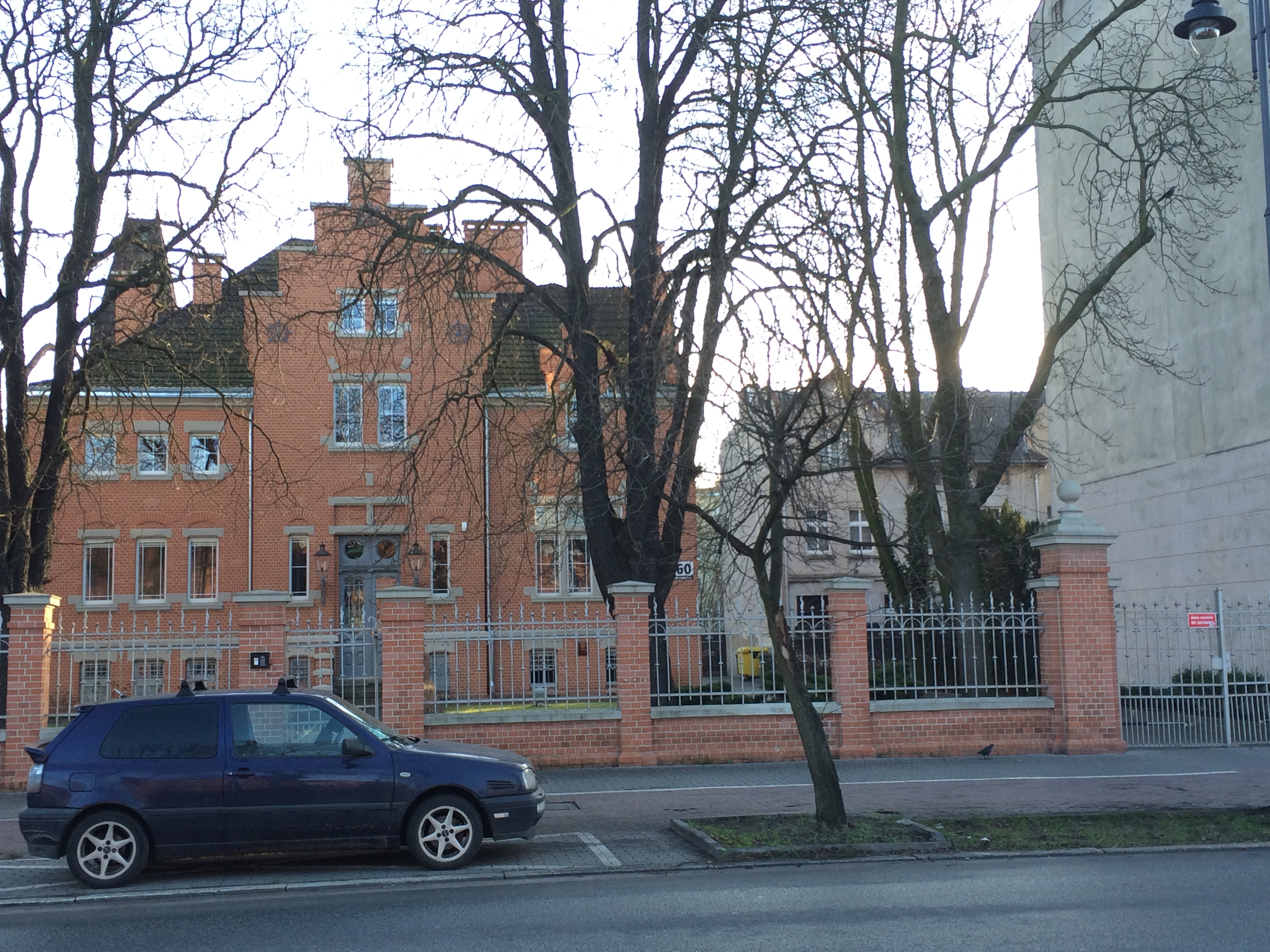
View from the street

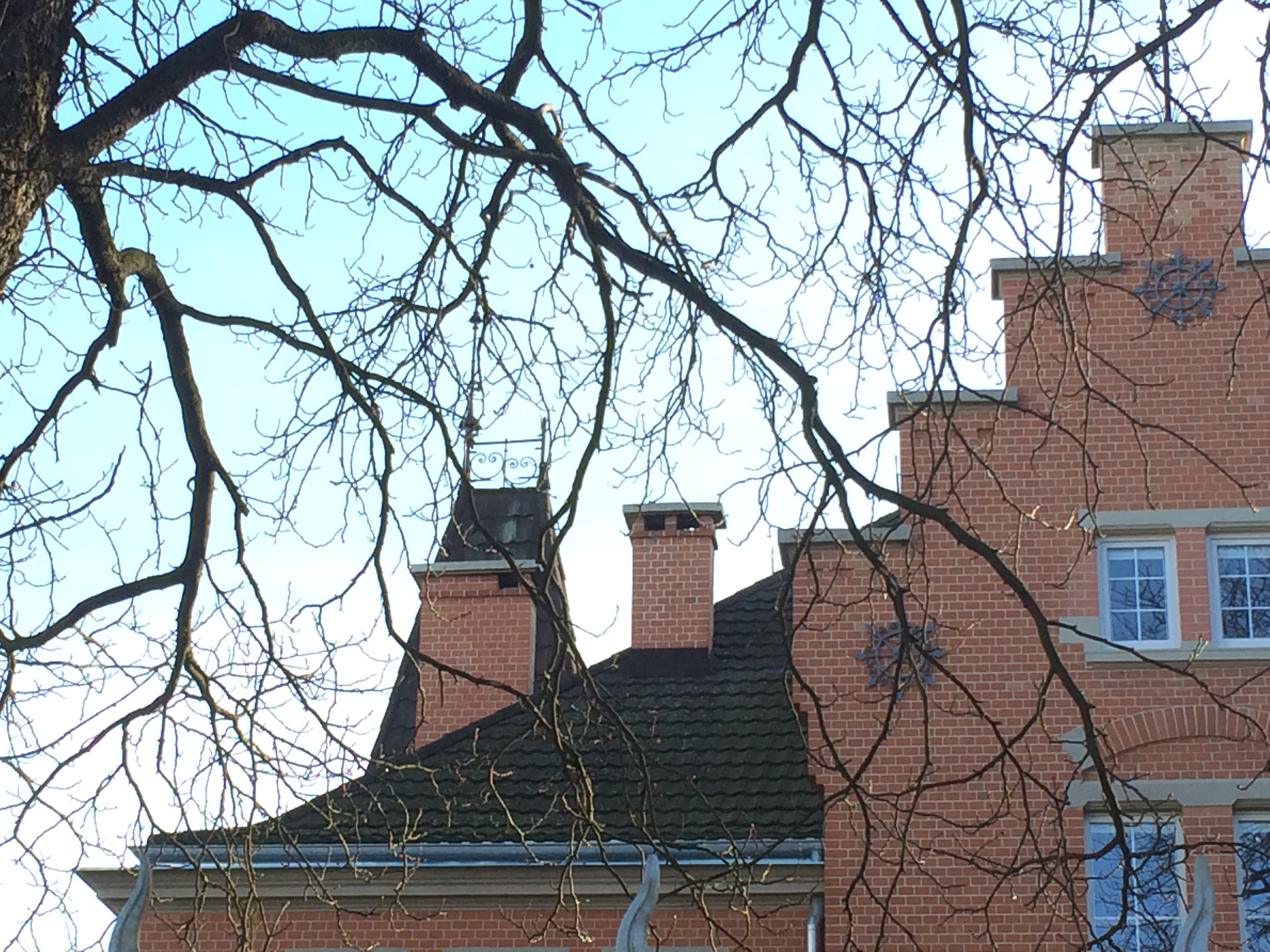
Detail of the gable

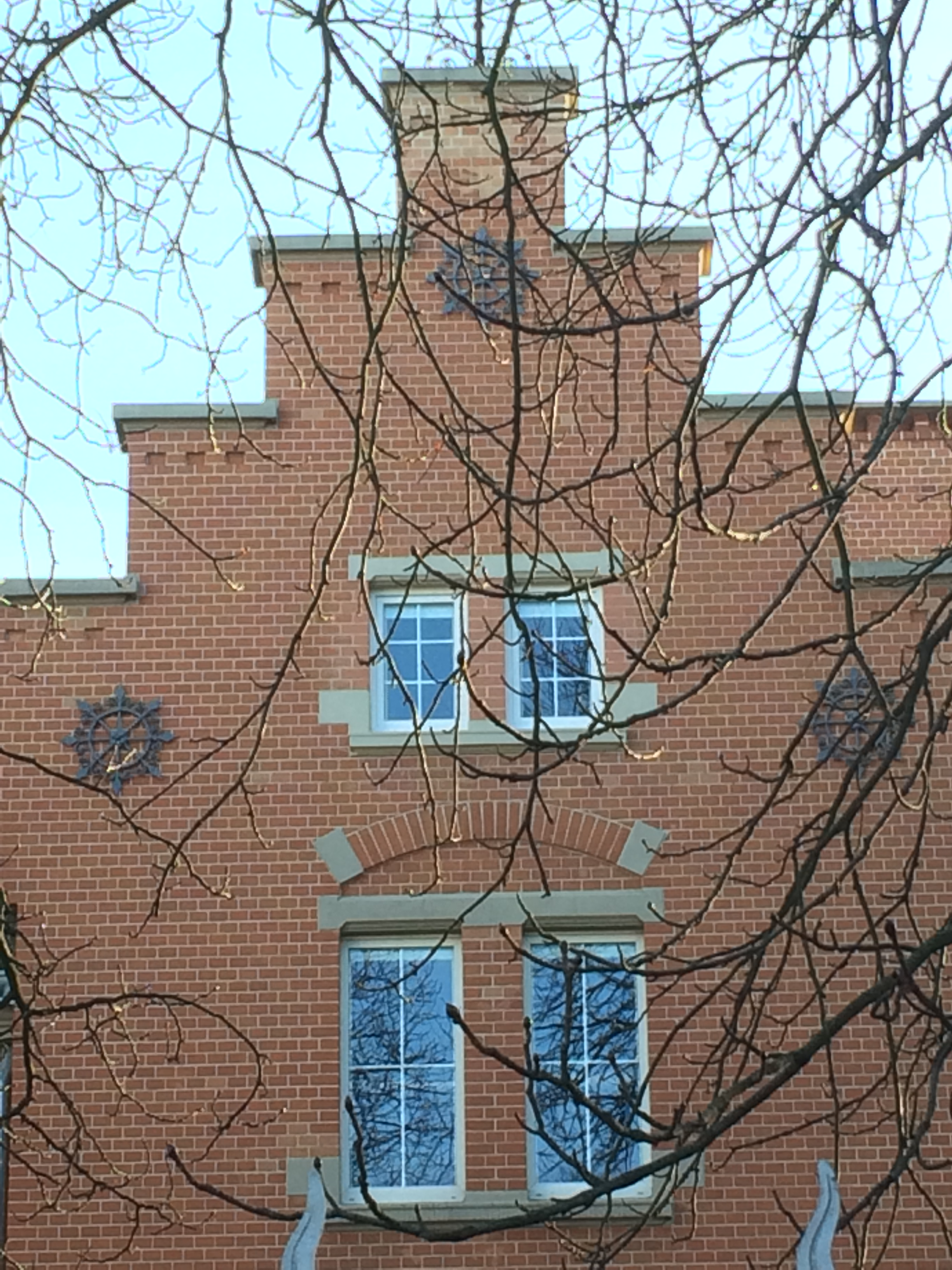
Facade Detail

=== Zdzisław Krzyszkowiak Stadium, at 163 ===
1960, by Jerzy Hofmann and 2008

Seat of Bydgoszcz sporting club Zawisza.

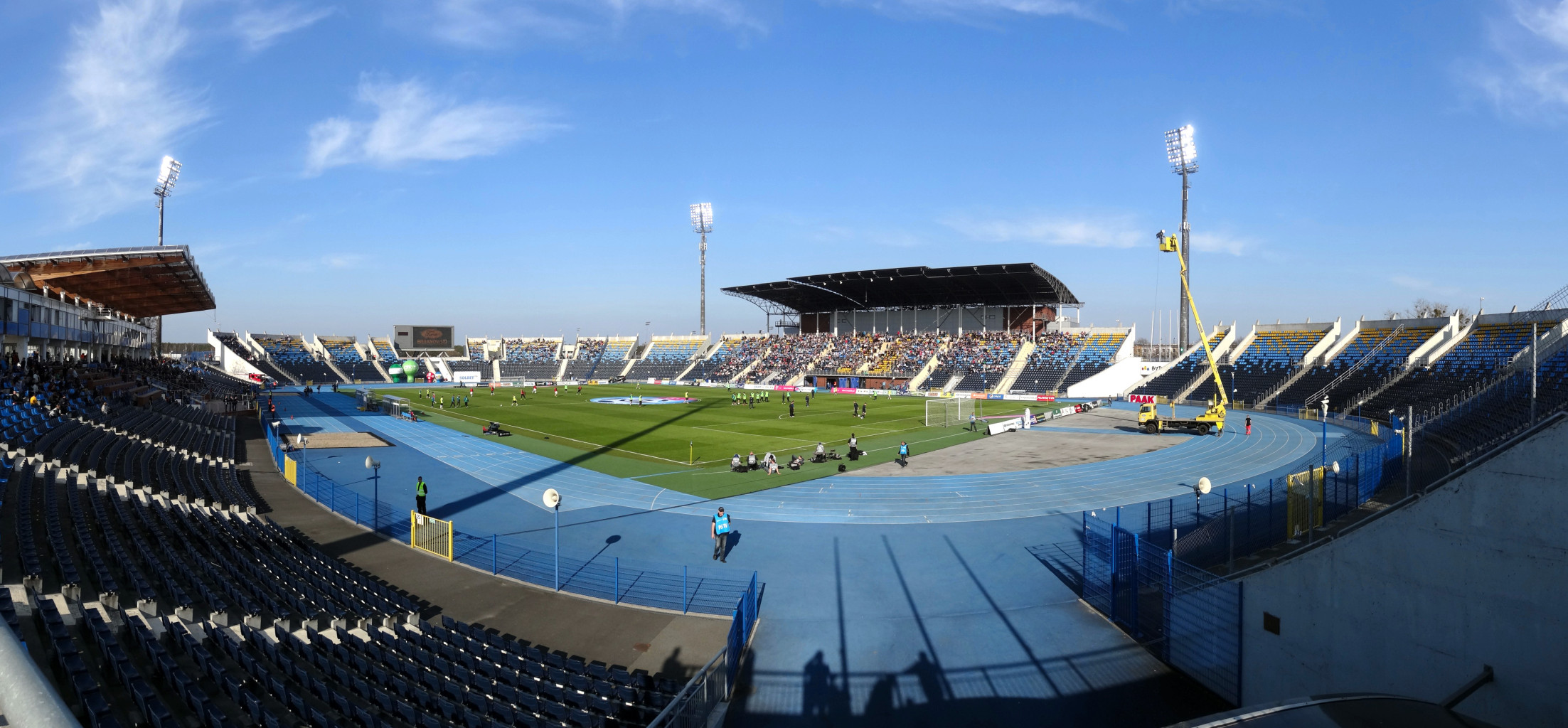
Zdzisław Krzyszkowiak Stadium

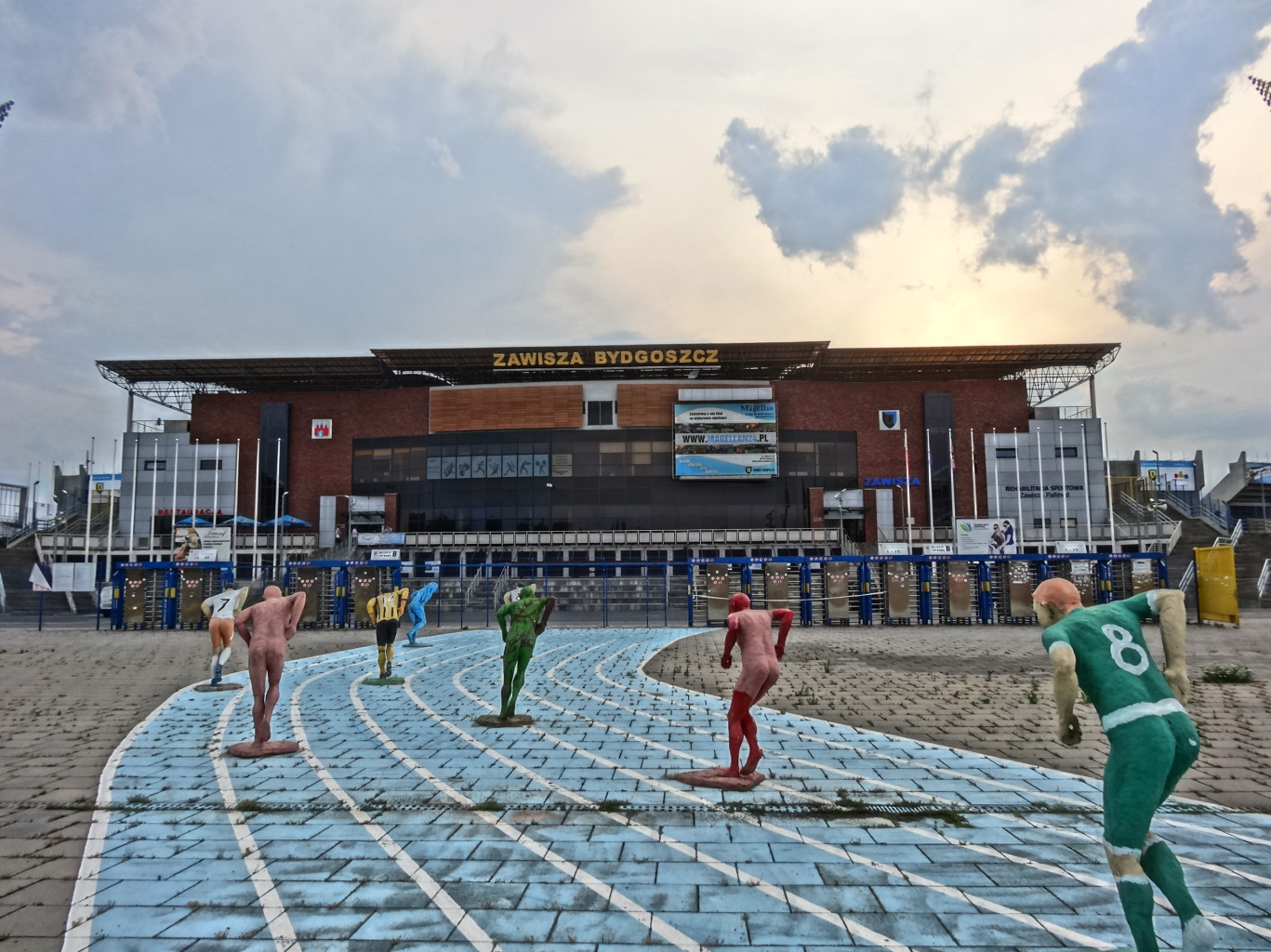
Front area

=== Villa at 172 ===
Built in 1910–1912

Art Nouveau

The villa has been built on a plot donated by Lewin Louis Aronsohn, a city banker and philanthropist, in order to house a care and education facility for small children (German: "Kleinkinderbewahranstalt").

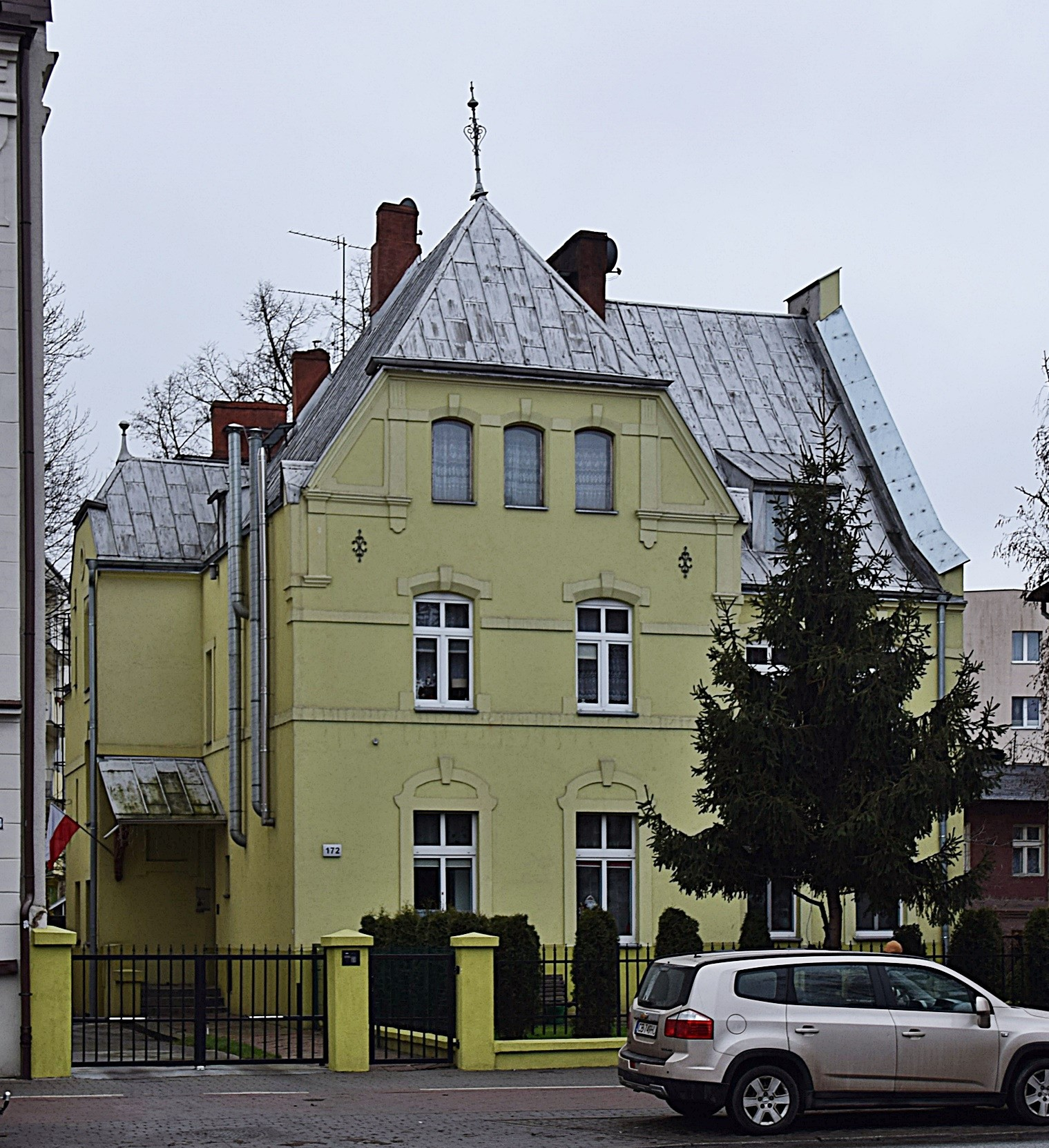
The villa seen from Gdańska Street

=== Tenement at 188 ===
1930-1939

Modern architecture.

Initially, the building was supposed to billet officers.

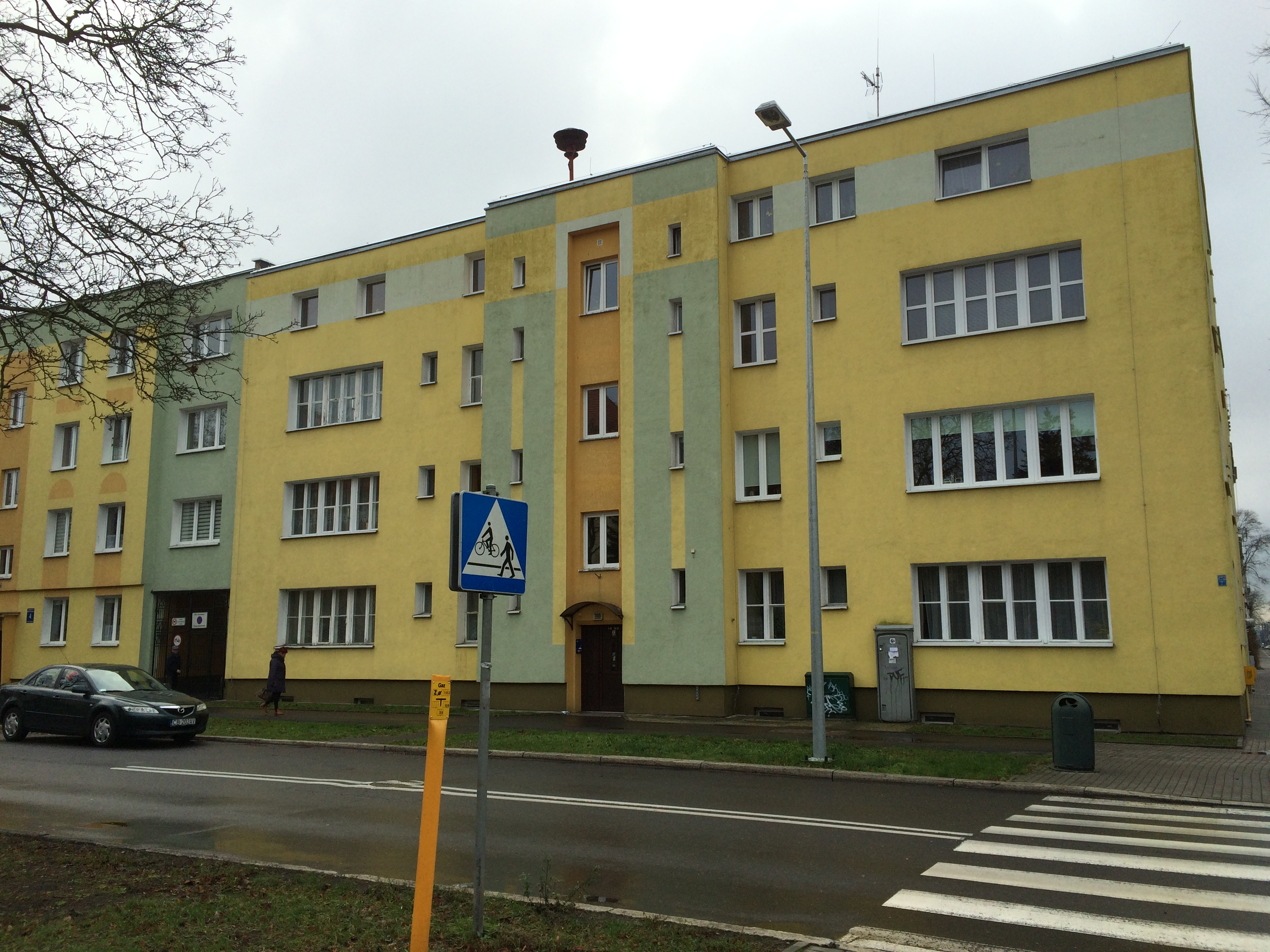
Facade from Gdańska Street

=== War College building, at 190 ===
1913–1914, by Arnold Hartmann, Robert Schlezinger

Eclecticism & Neo-baroque

Built as the seat of the German War College, the edifice housed a military hospital during World War I.

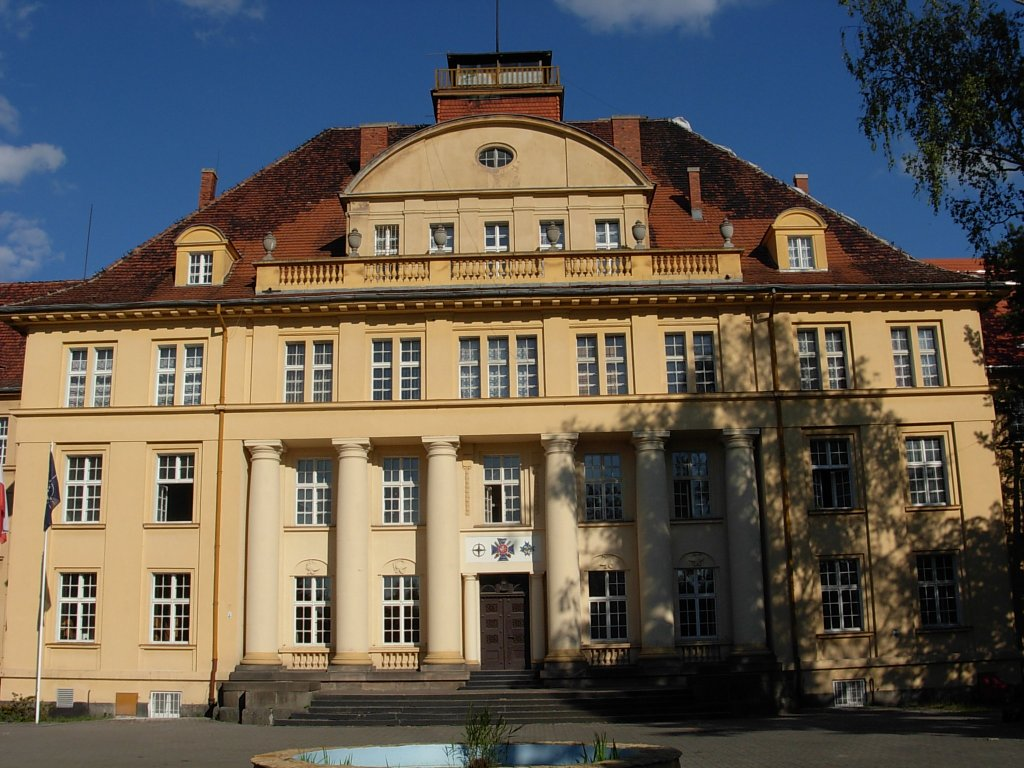
War College building

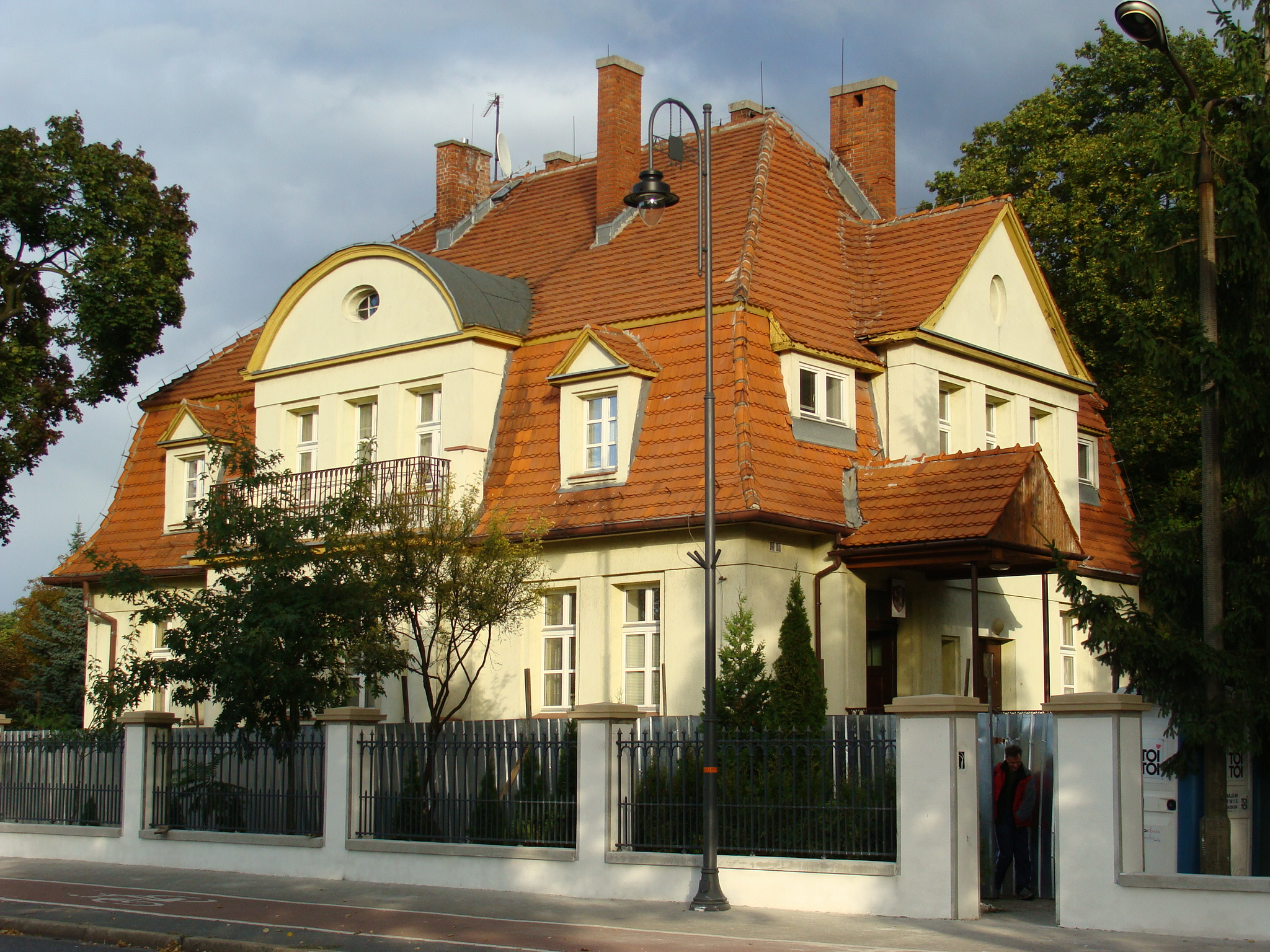
Commander's villa

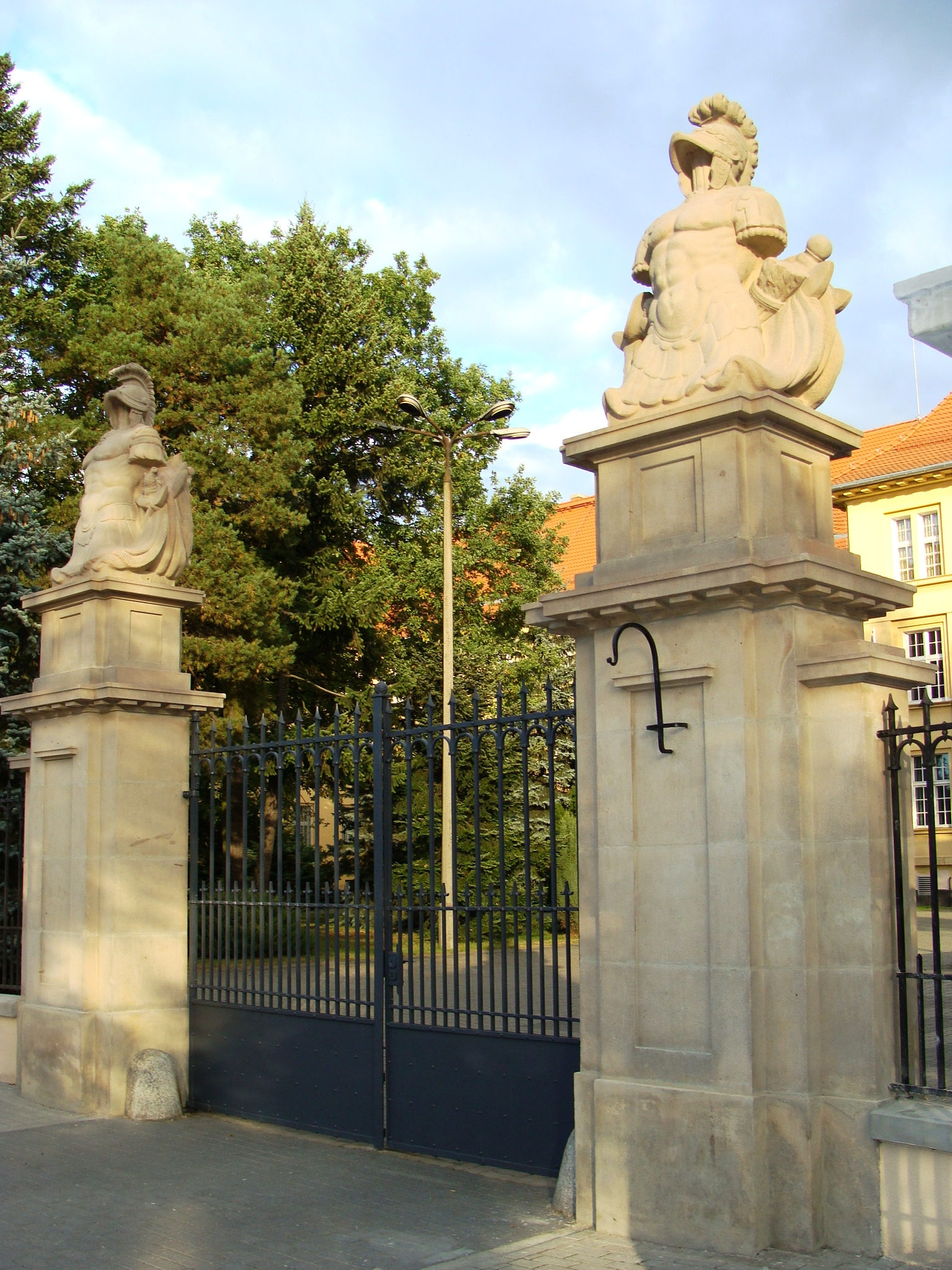
Main gate

=== Pomeranian Army Museum at 2 Czerkaska Street ===
1973, by Zbigniew Kortas

Functionalism

The museum presents the military history of Pomerania and Kujawy from the Greater Poland Uprising (1918–1919) till today. After the transformation in 2010, the museum presents additional sets of equipment and weapons. The institution inherited the tradition of a pre-war military museum operating since 1928, in the Cadet School for Non-Commissioned Officer in Bydgoszcz, housed in the War College building at Nr.190. The main highlights of this ancient collection were, among others: elements from the room of the Teutonic Order great master in Malbork; a blade and firearms from 18th-19th centuries; a diploma signed by King August III; a snuffbox donated by Napoleon on Elba Island; hair from Tadeusz Kościuszko. All these items, scattered during World War II, have never been recovered.

The contemporary building, located at Czerkaska street has been created by architect Zbigniew Kortas in 1973 and was erected on a plot that belonged to the War College since 1913. In 2007, the Museum gained the status of state cultural institution, and in 2010, it has been transformed into a branch of the Army Museum, together with museums in Toruń and Wrocław.

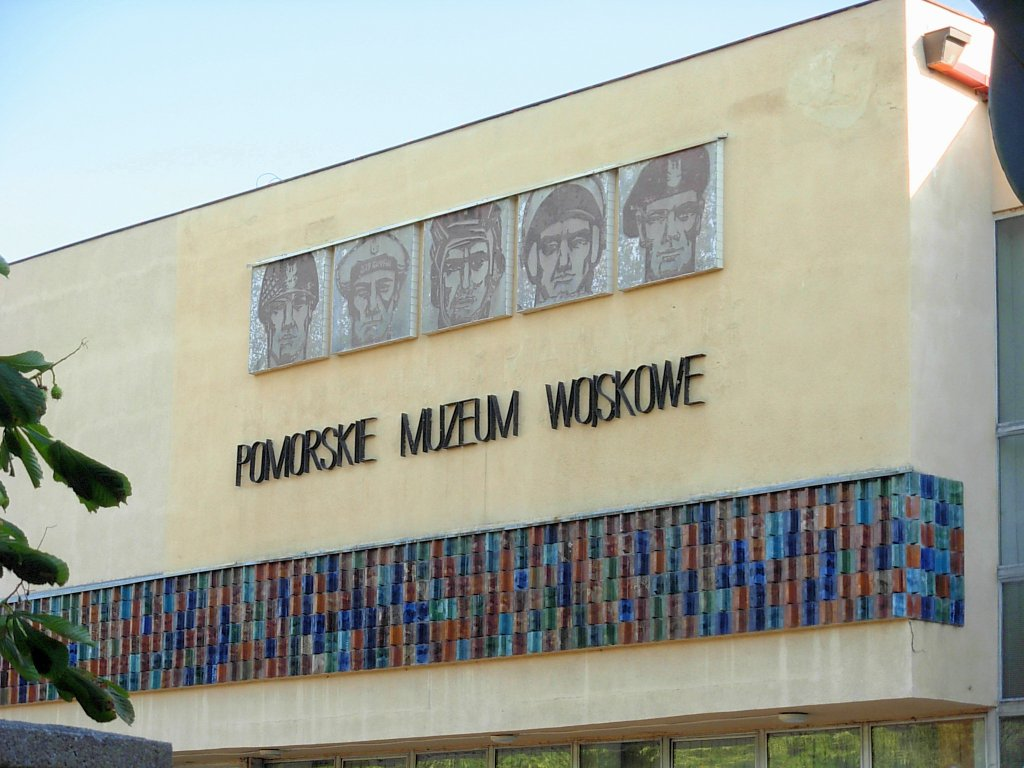
Museum building

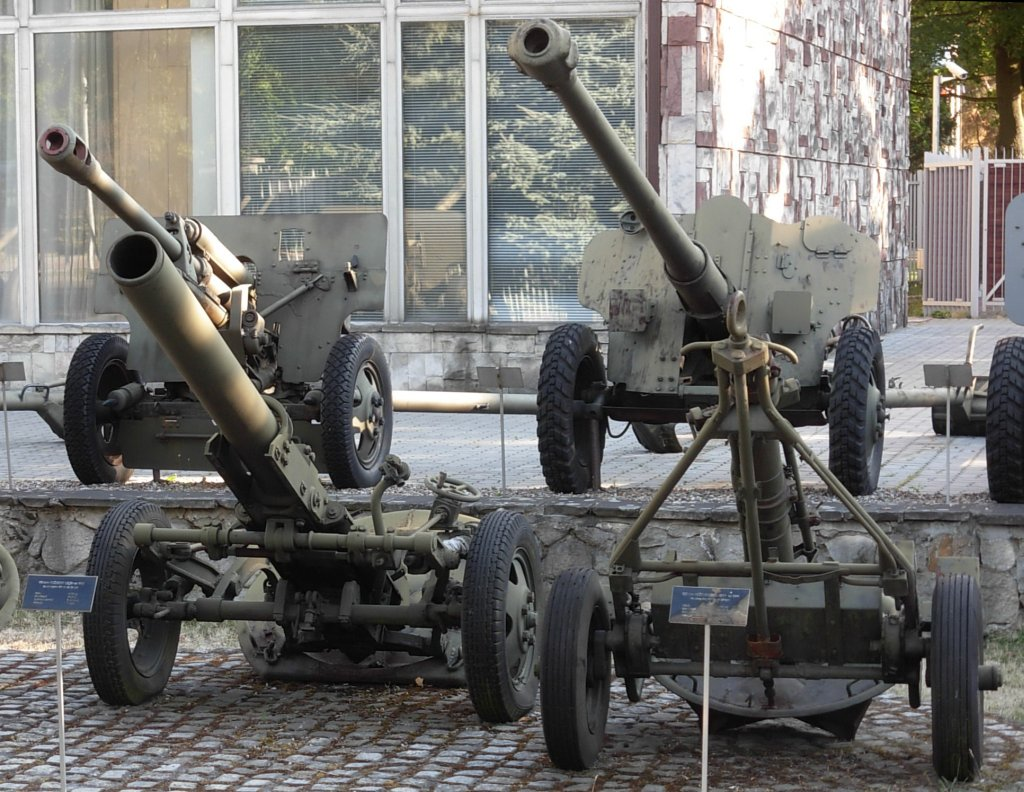
Permanent outdoor exhibition

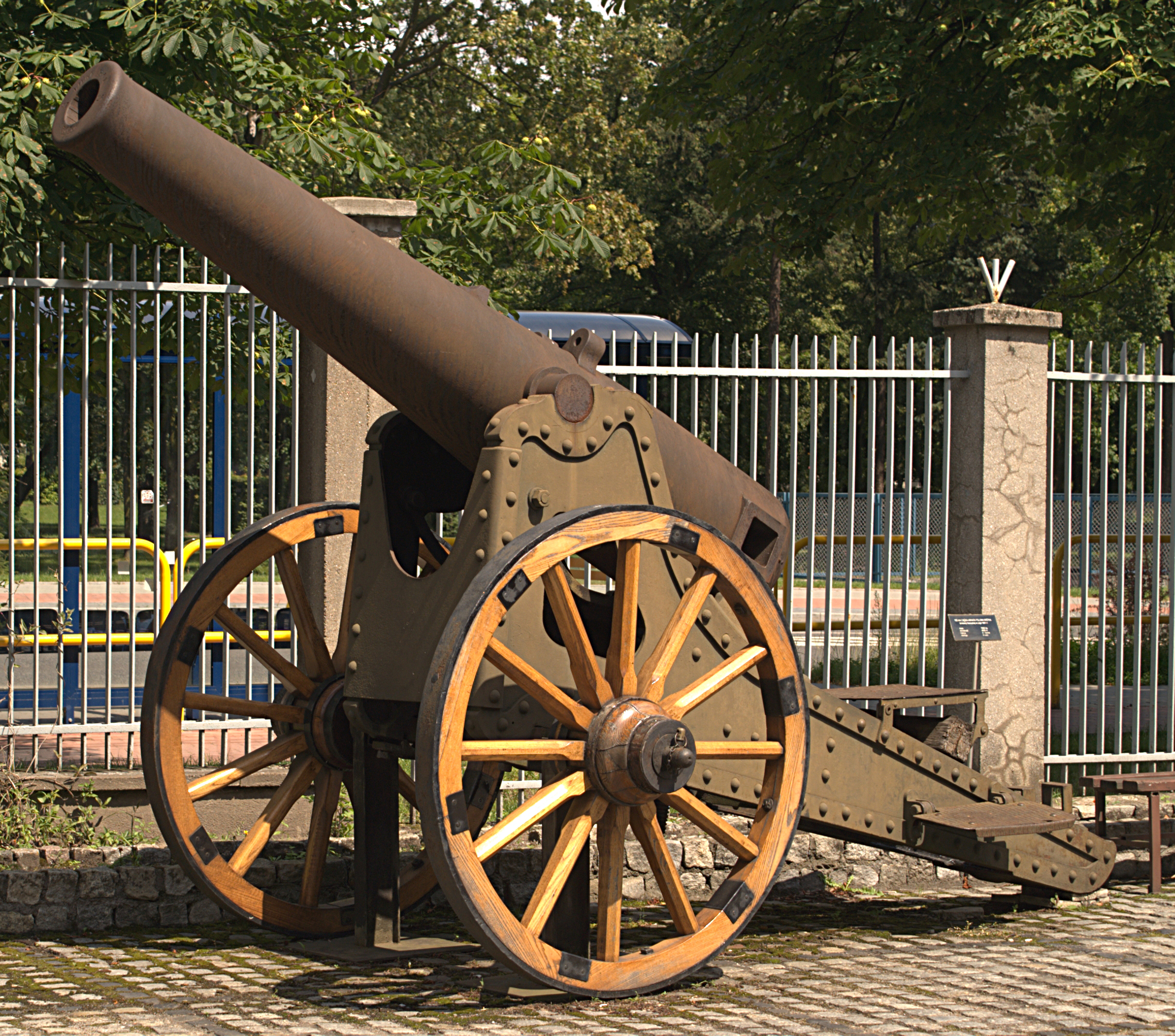
Permanent outdoor exhibition, a 155mm canon

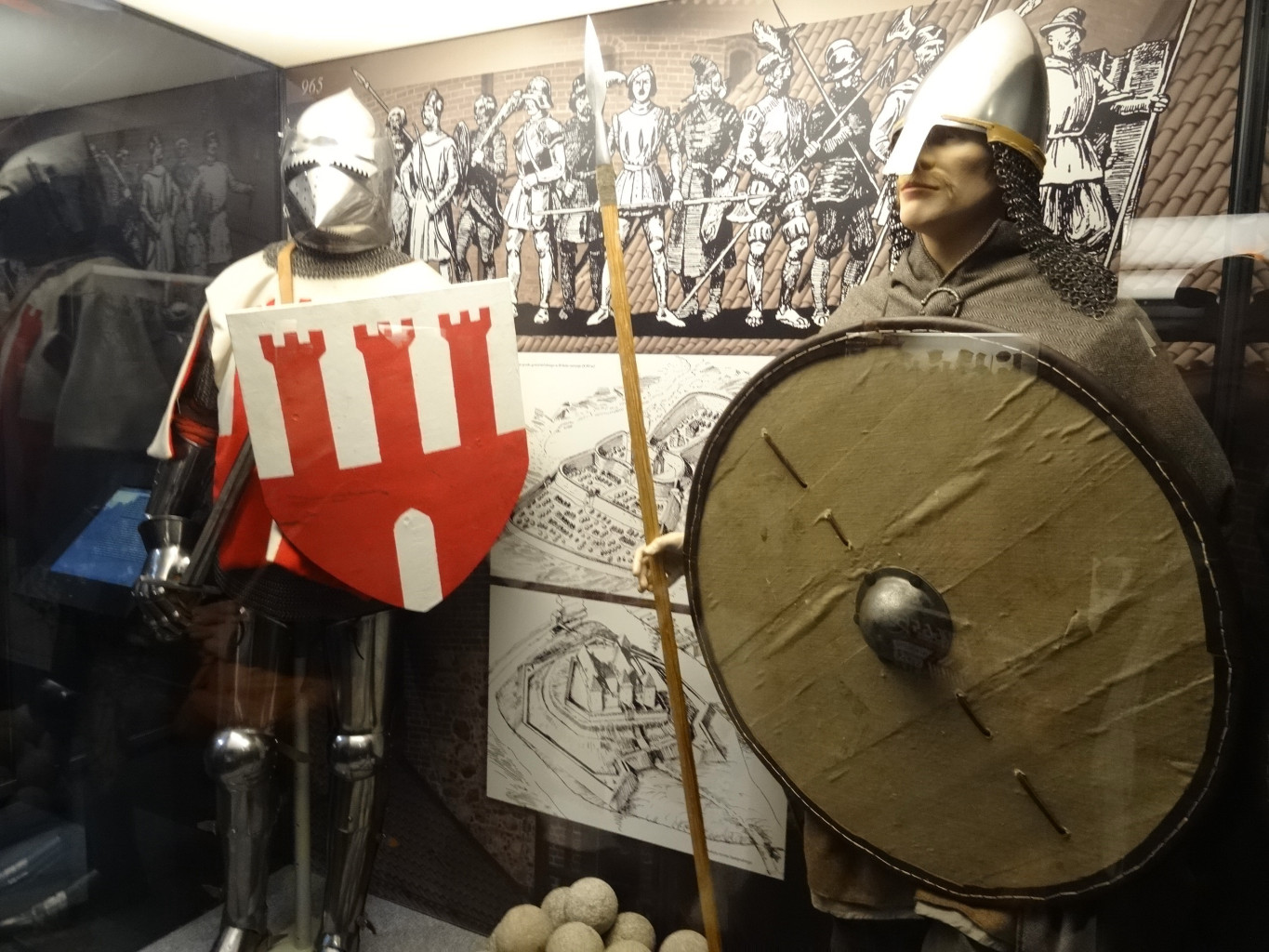
Inside exhibit

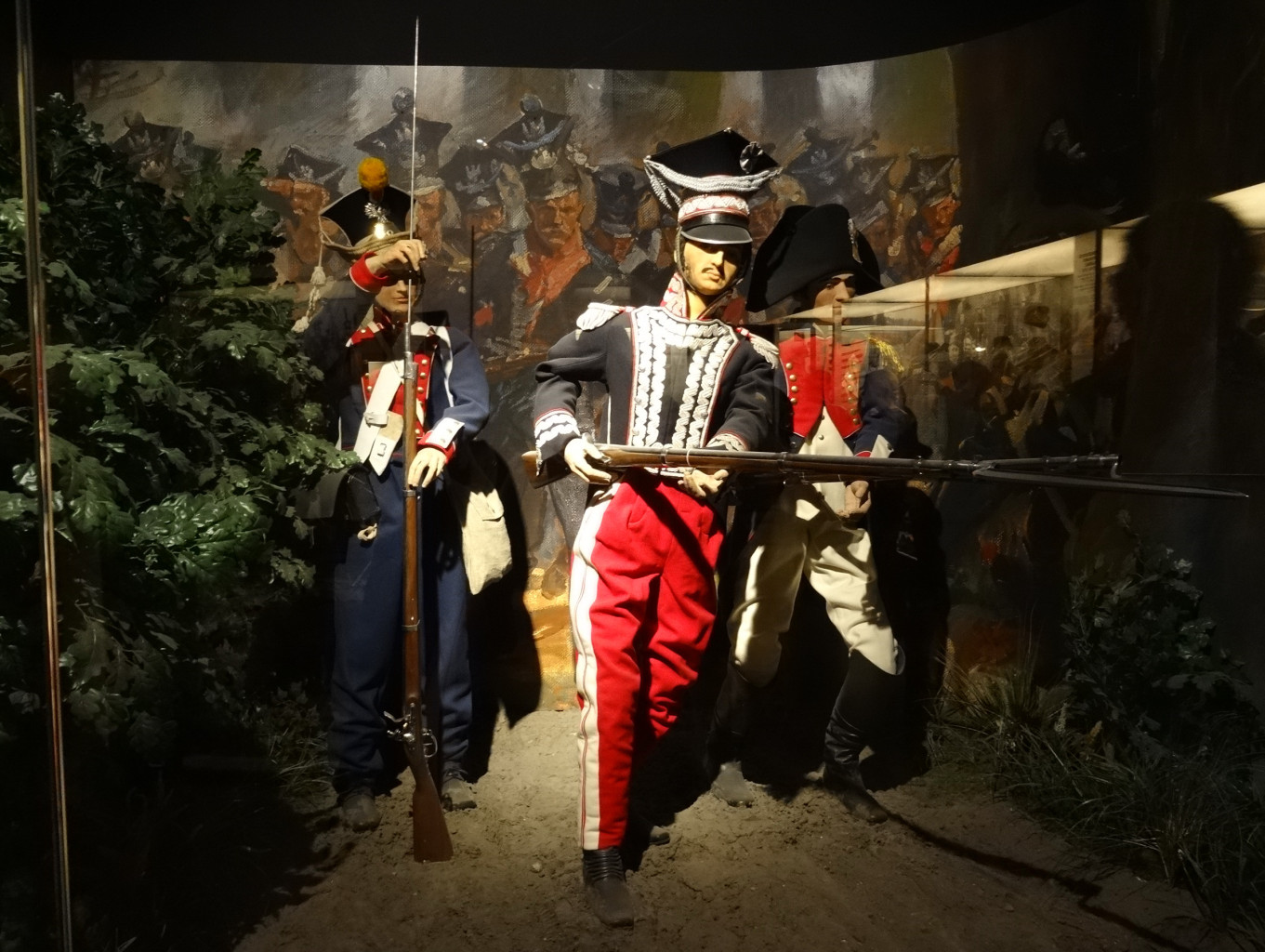
Inside exhibit

=== Buildings at 208/238 ===
1935-1939

Functionalism

This row of flats has been designed before the Second World War by different architects:

- Jan Kossowski (1898–1958), for plots 208 and 214 (1936–1938);
- Architects Kossowski, J. Trojanski, T. Krieger, M. Zablonski for the other plots.
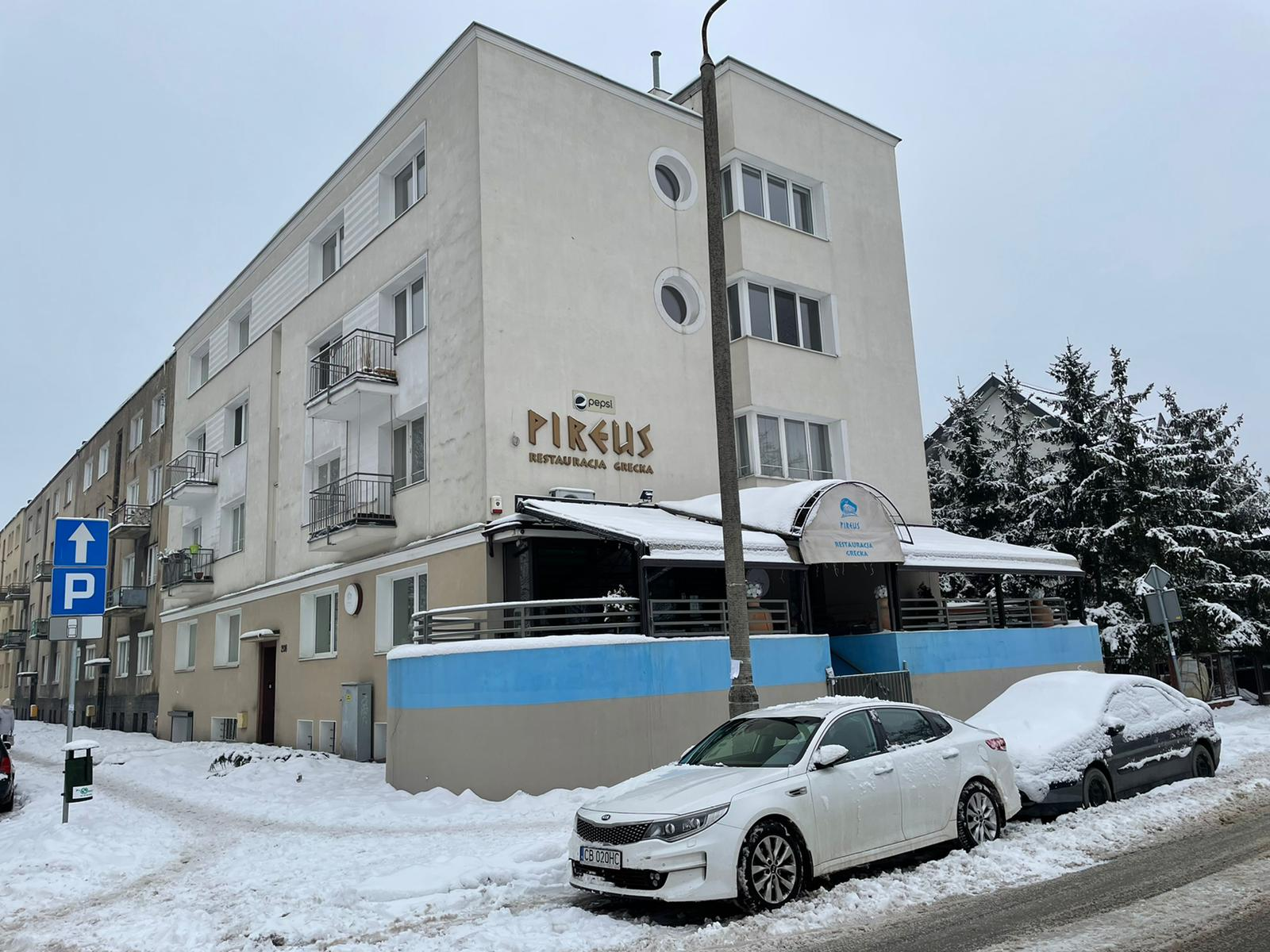
Building at 208

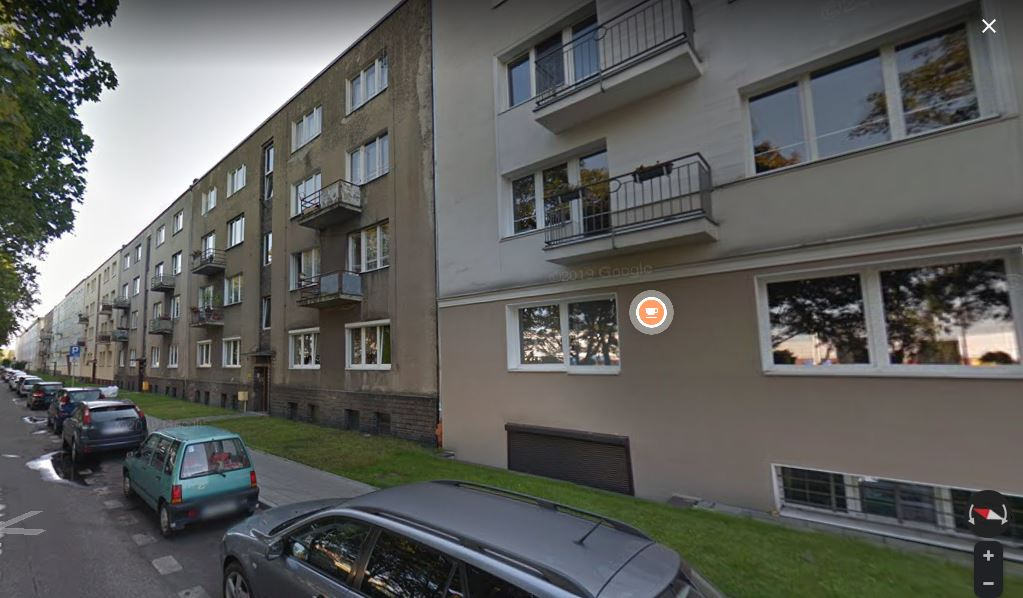
Row of habitations (208 to 238)

=== Water Supply Station "Las Gdański", at 242 ===
1900, by F. Marschall

Neo-Gothic

The water supply complex, established in 1900, is still operative today.

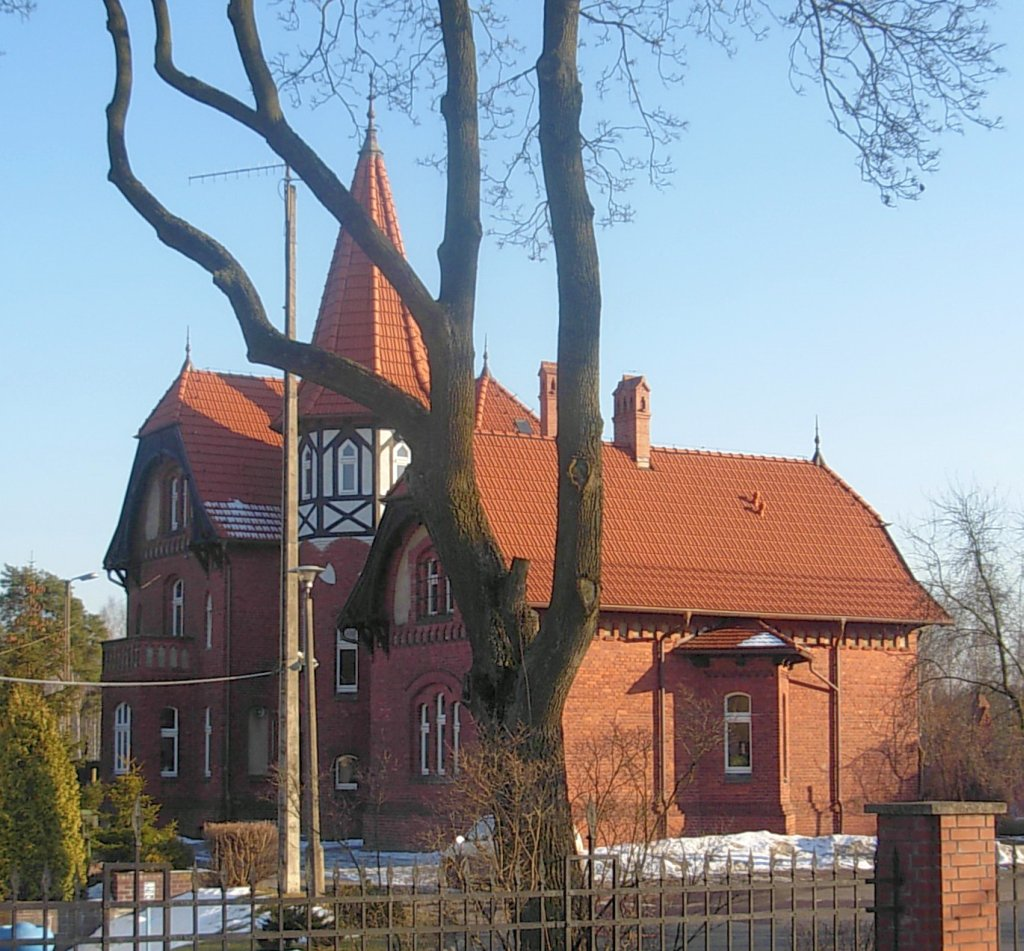
Water Supply Station Las Gdański

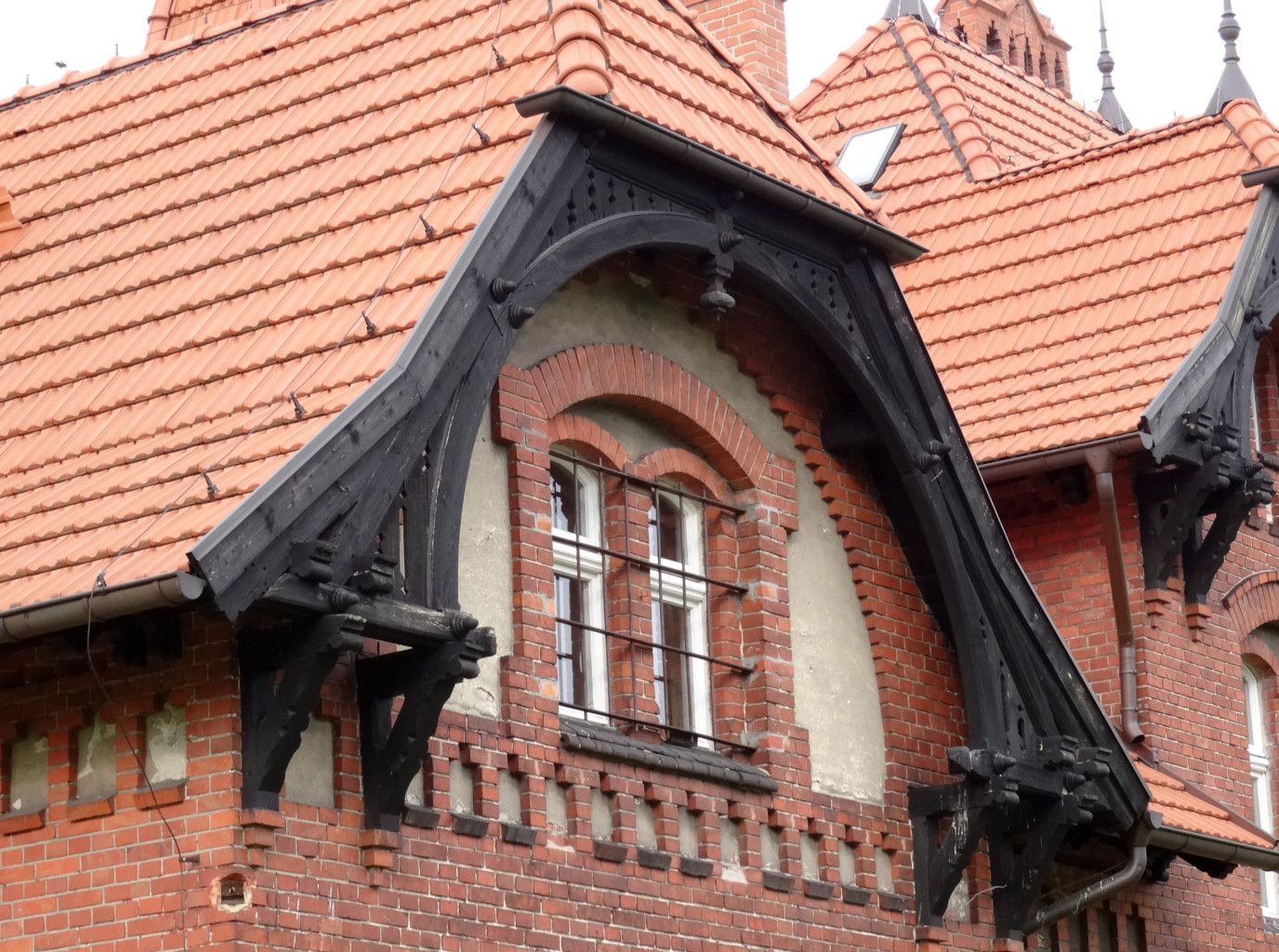
Architectural details

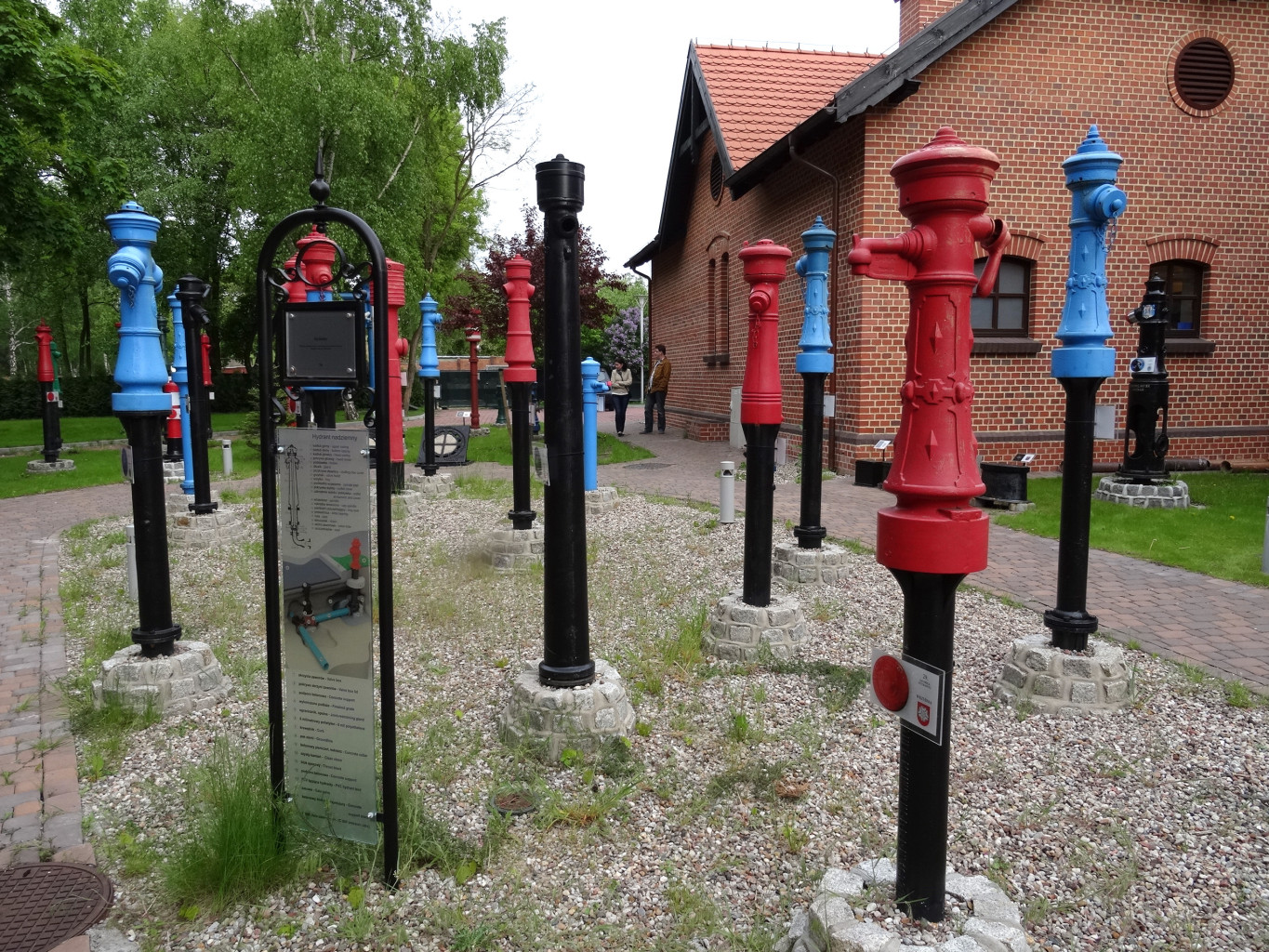
Outdoor exhibition
