= Bocianowo Street, Bydgoszcz =

Street in Bydgoszcz, Poland

Bocianowo Street
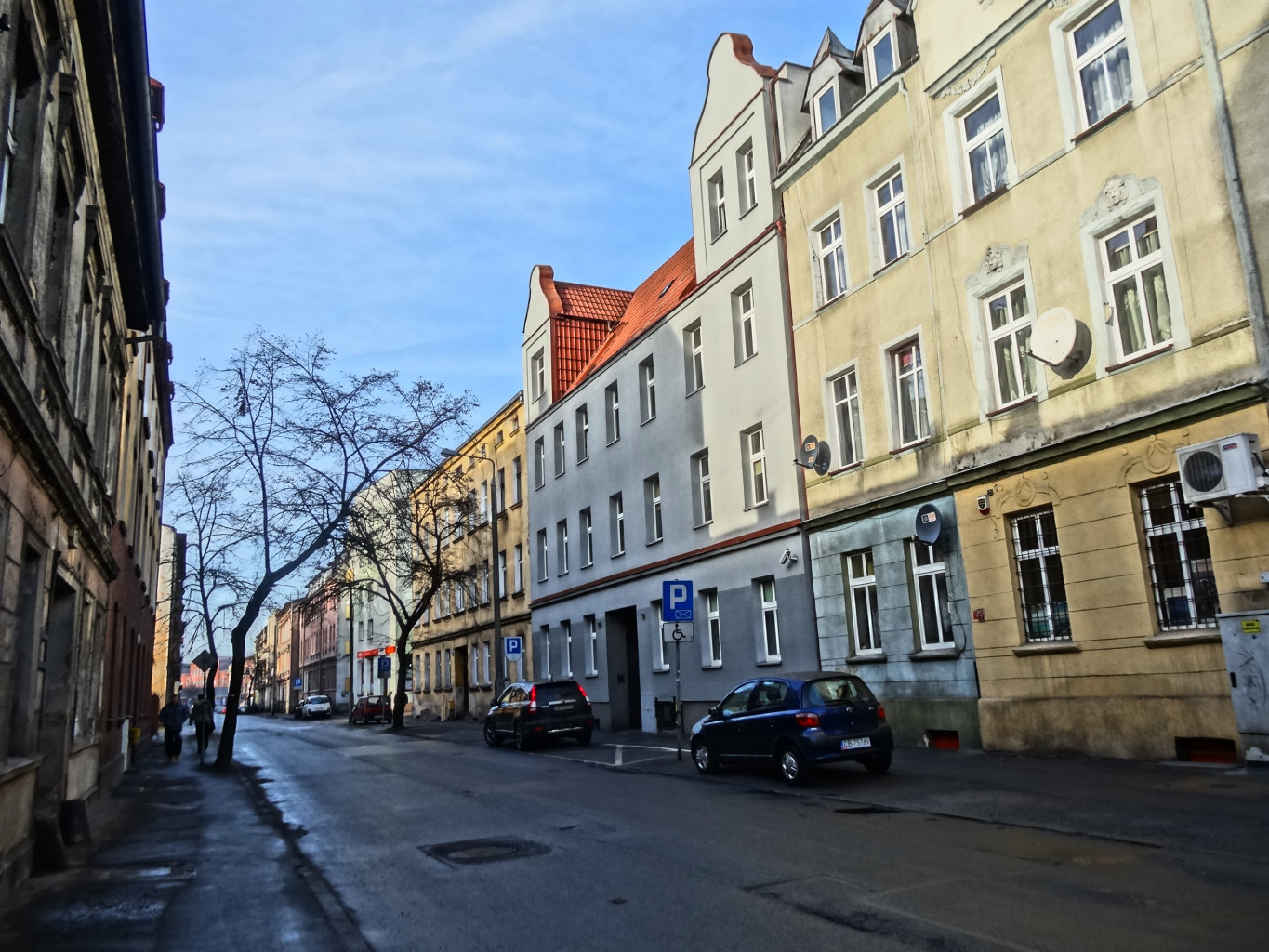
- Street view westward

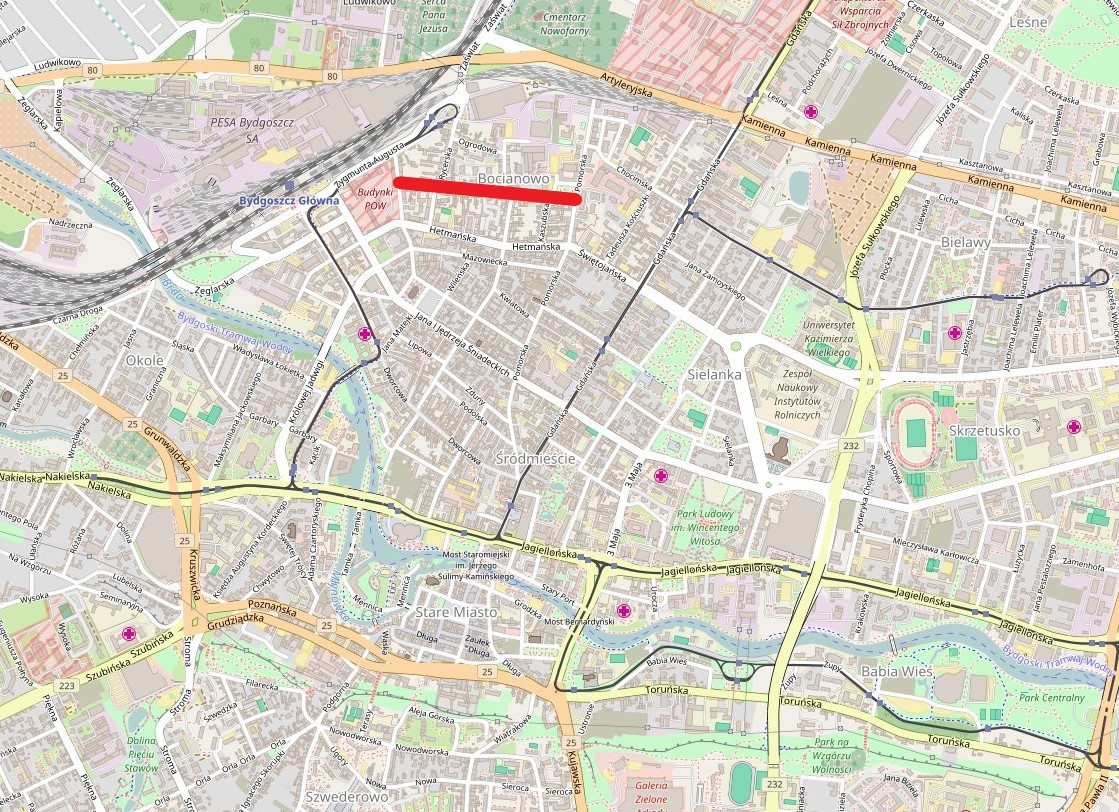
- Bocianowo street highlighted on a map
- Native name: Ulica Bocianowo w Bydgoszczy (Polish)
- Former name: Brenkenhoff Straße
- Part of: Bocianowo district
- Owner: City of Bydgoszcz
- Length: 600 m (2,000 ft)
- Width: c. 10 metres (33 ft)
- Location: Bydgoszcz, Poland
- Coordinates: 53°08′06″N 18°00′10″E

Construction
- Construction start: Late 1870s

Bocianowo Street, in Bocianowo district, is a 600 metres (2,000 ft) long path in the northern part of Bydgoszcz city. Its facades display various architectural styles and its history sticks with the end-of-19th-century development of the town.

== Location ==
Located in the Bocianowo district, the street is laid on an east–west axis, from Pomorska street to Sowińskiego street.

On its path, the thoroughfare crosses the following streets:

- Kaszubska;
- Henryka Sienkiewicza;
- Racławicka;
- Rycerska;
- Żółkiewskiego.

Bocianowo refers to the name of the district. The latter comes from the farming domain established in the area: Bocian means Stork in Polish.

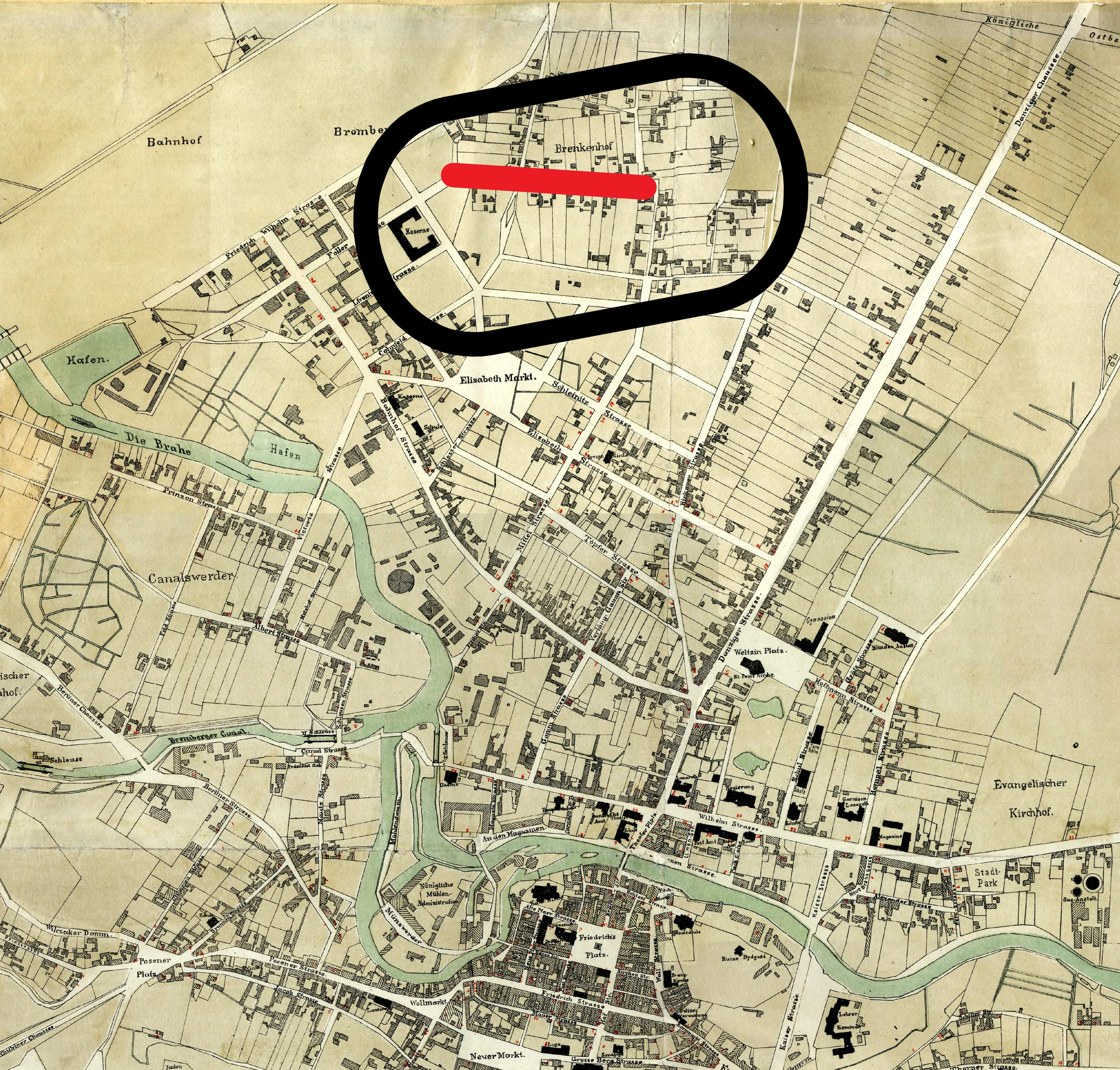
Bocianowo area and street, ca 1876

== History ==
Until the beginning of the 19th century, the Brenkenhoff farm or "folwark" was settled in the place of the present district. In 1851, the area was incorporated into the territory of then Bromberg city.

In 1867, the construction of the railway to Toruń required the purchase of part of the Brenkenhoff/Bocianowo estate; the line is no more existent today. At that time were laid out Bocianowo street (then "Brenkenhoff straße"), as well as Sienkiewicza street ("Mittel straße"), Rycerska street ("Wörth straße") and Racławicka street ("Ritter straße"). They were mainly the abode of railway workers.

The path of Bocianowo street can be traced back to an 1876 city map, where the axis is underlined in the northern area of "Brenkenhoff".

== Main areas and edifices ==
=== Tenement at 1, corner with 71 Pomorska Street ===
1894–1895

Eclecticism

Initial address was Verlängerte Rinkauerstraße 7 or Verlängerte Brenkenhoff Straße 7 and it was first owned by Franziska Kowalkowska, a widow. David Kukuk ran the distillery on the ground floor in the 1910s. The Kowalkowski family lived in the tenement till the turn of the 20th century.

The elevations have been restored in 2021. One can make out cartouches, the tympanum above the gate and the pediments of the first floor bearing the initial "K", recalling the first landlord, "Kowalkowski".

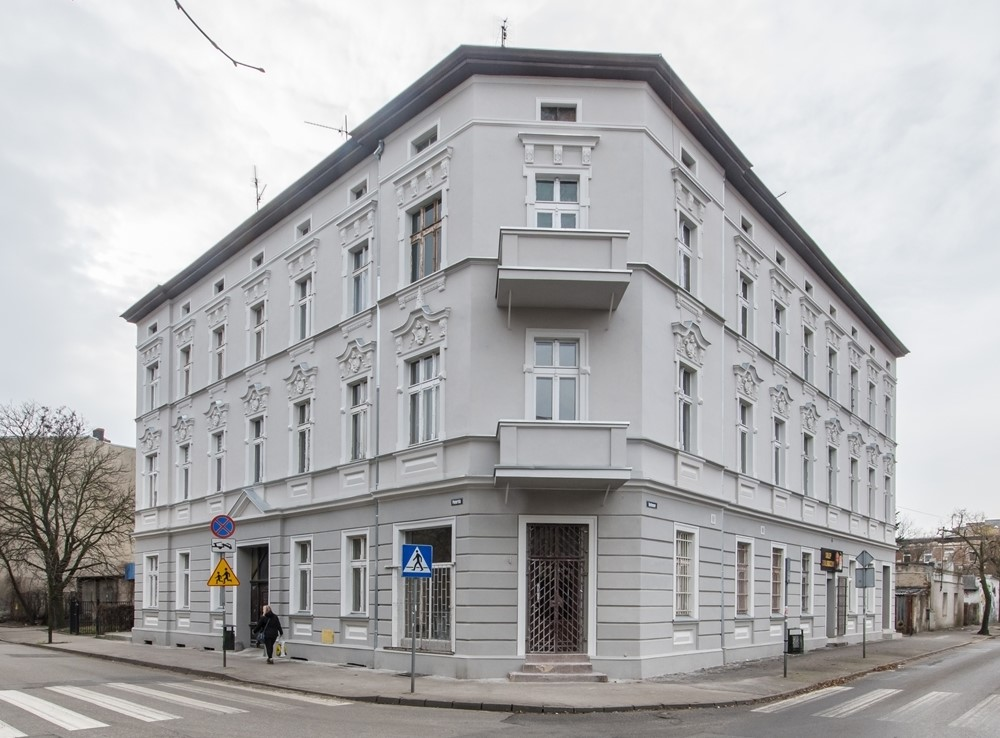
Renovated building, corner view

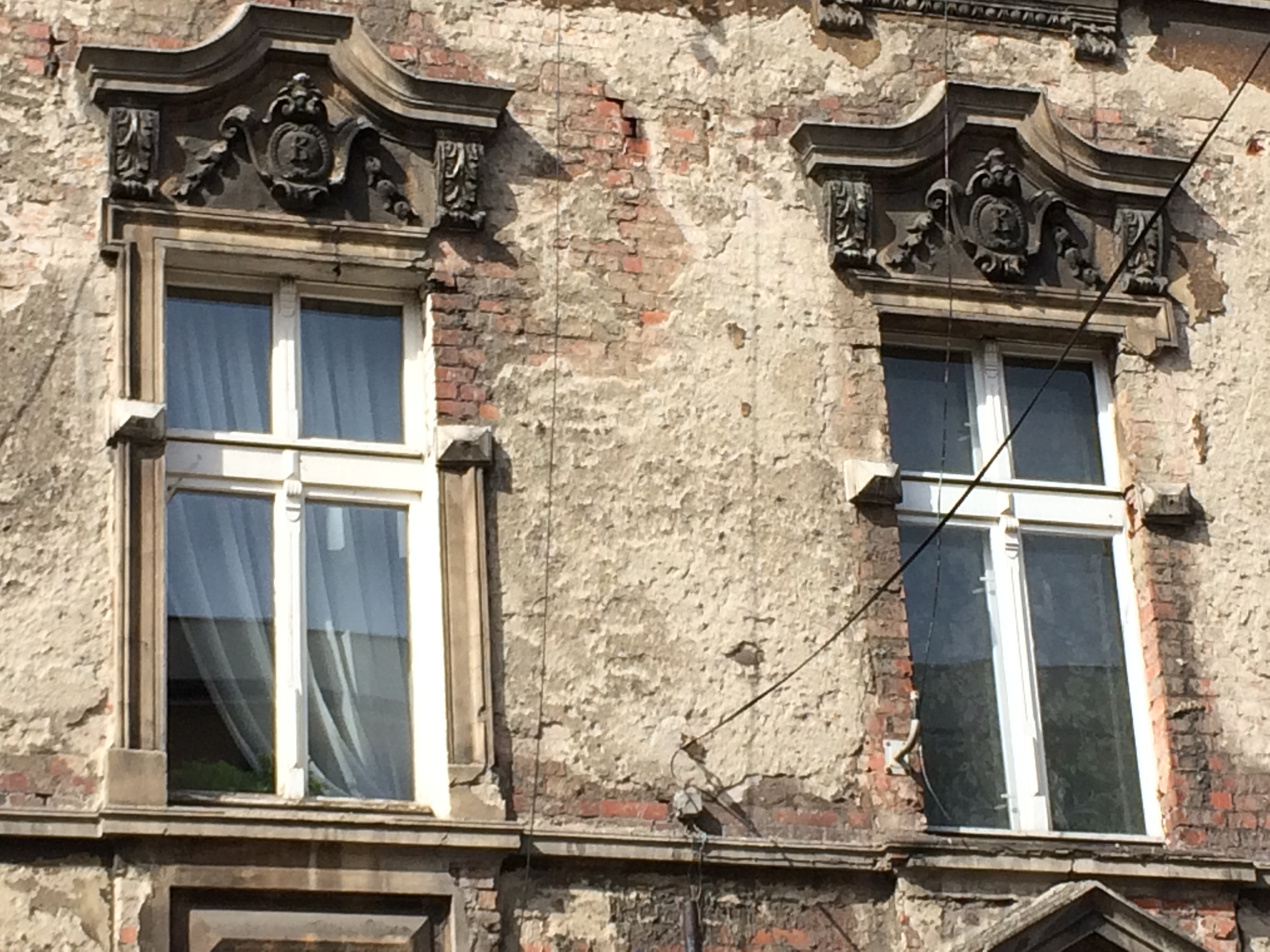
Pediment detail with the "K" initial, before refurbishment

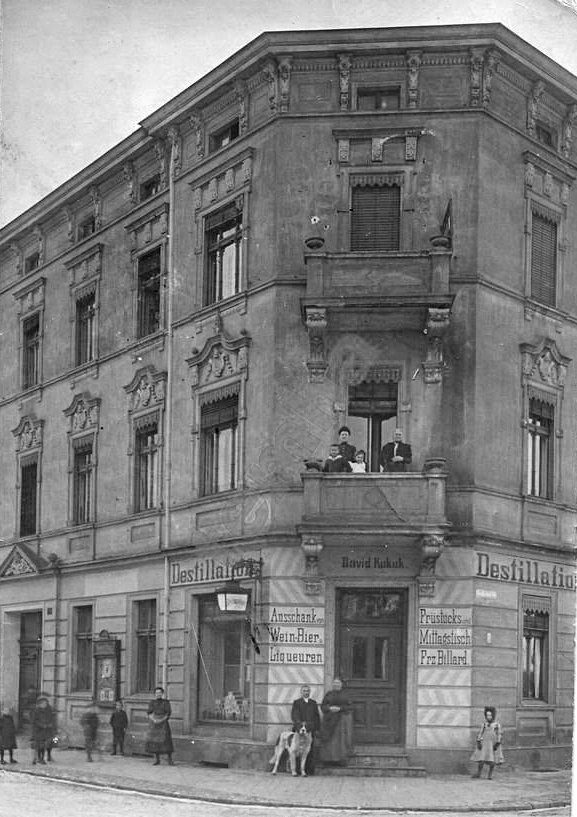
The tenement in the 1910s

=== Tadeusz Kościuszko Square ===
In the beginning of the 19th century, a cemetery was located on this plot. Historically, this comes from a city's privilege until 1811 to bury the dead in random squares and squares.

The square, delimited by Bocianowo and Pomorska streets, bears since 1973, the sculpture Wings of the Sea (Polish: Skrzydła morza), by Anna Szalast. The monument celebrates the industrial heritage of Bydgoszcz. It echoes in particular the nearby presence of the factory "FAMOR" at Kaszubska street.

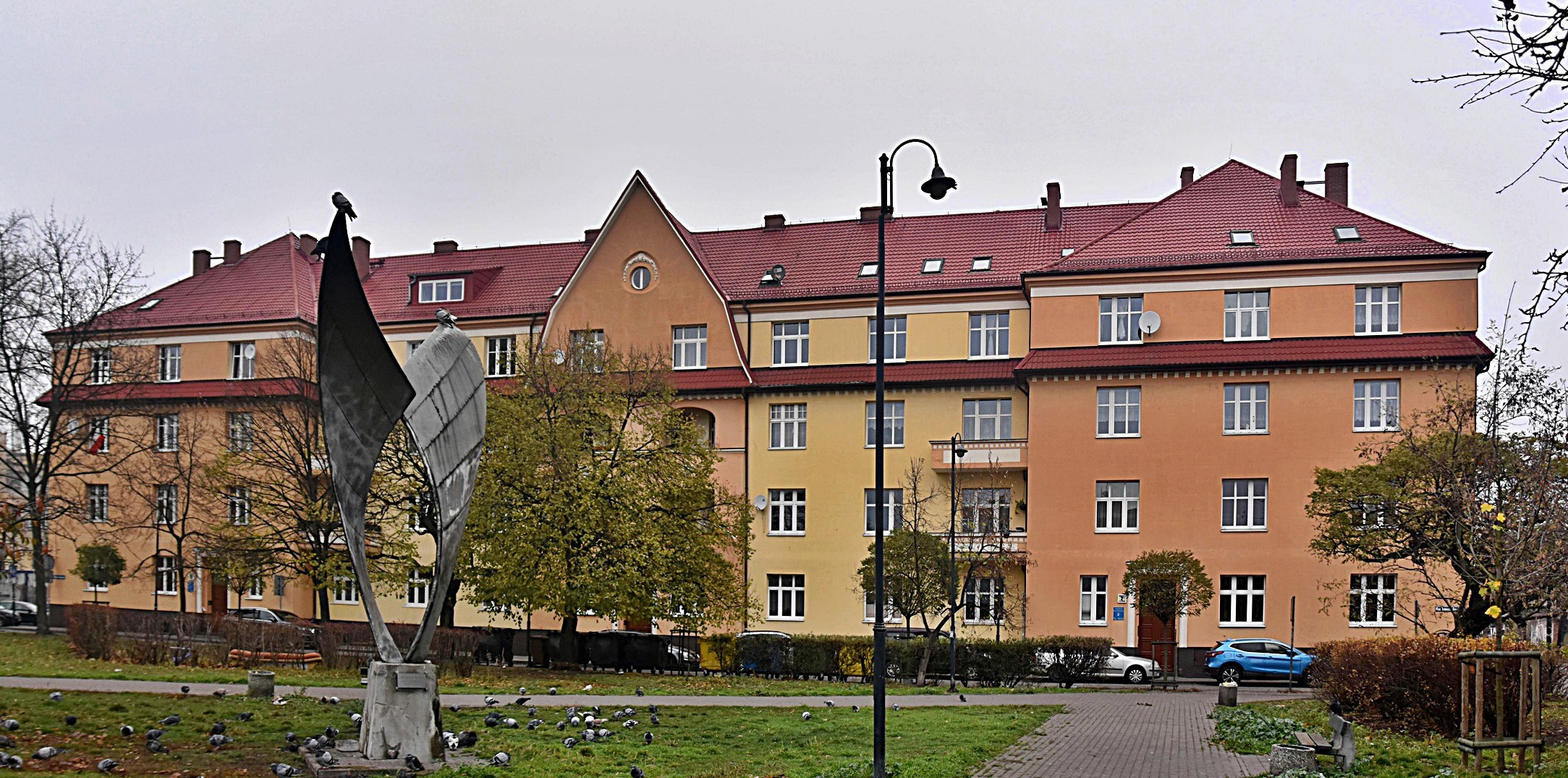
View of Tadeusz Kosciuszko square

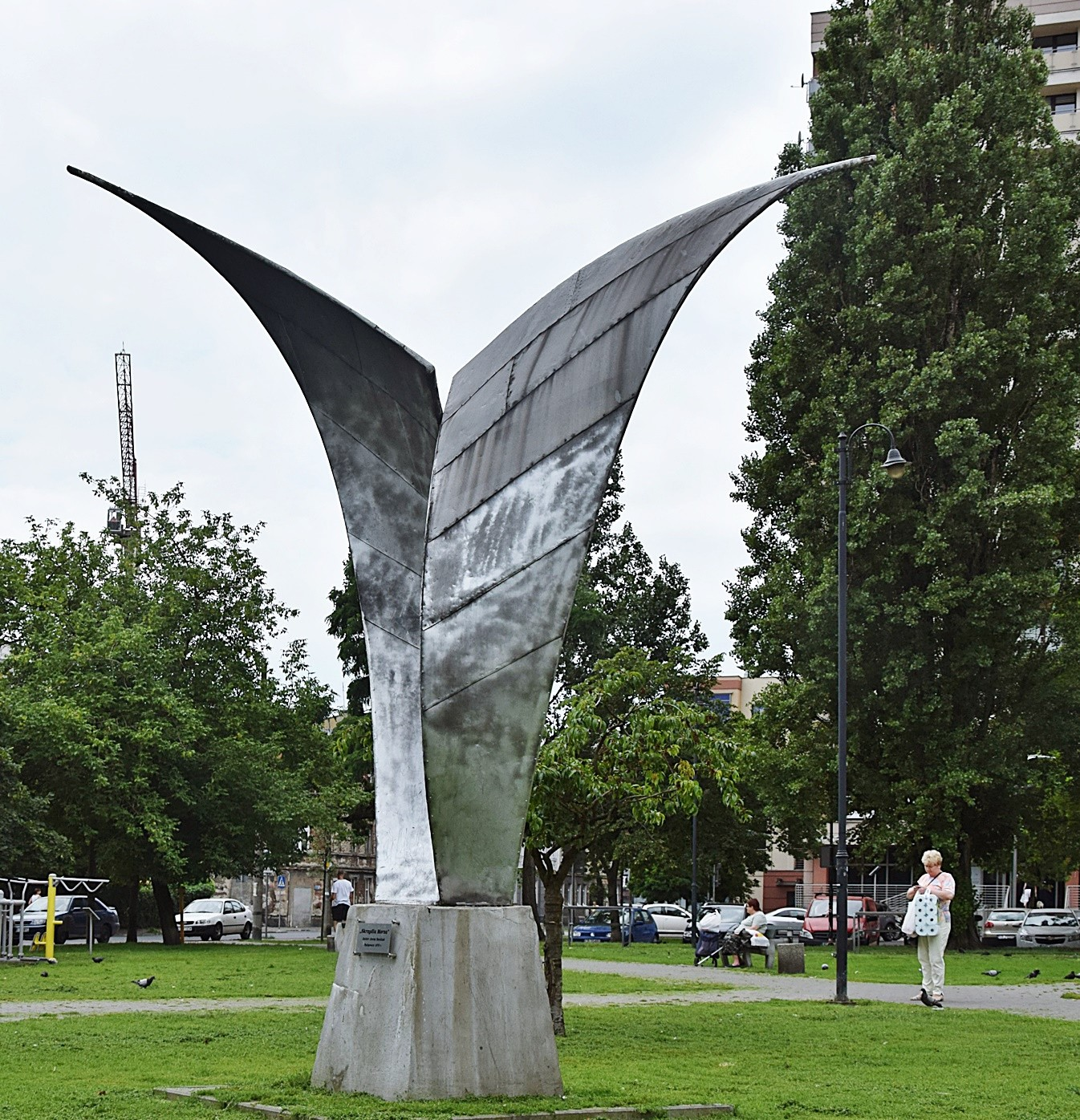
Sculpture "Wings of the Sea"

=== Buildings at 6 and 8 ===
1950s

Modernism

The plots have been used as gardens (Polish: ogród) till the 1950s.

The tenement at 6 has been renovated in 2021, Nr.8 is being renovated in 2022.

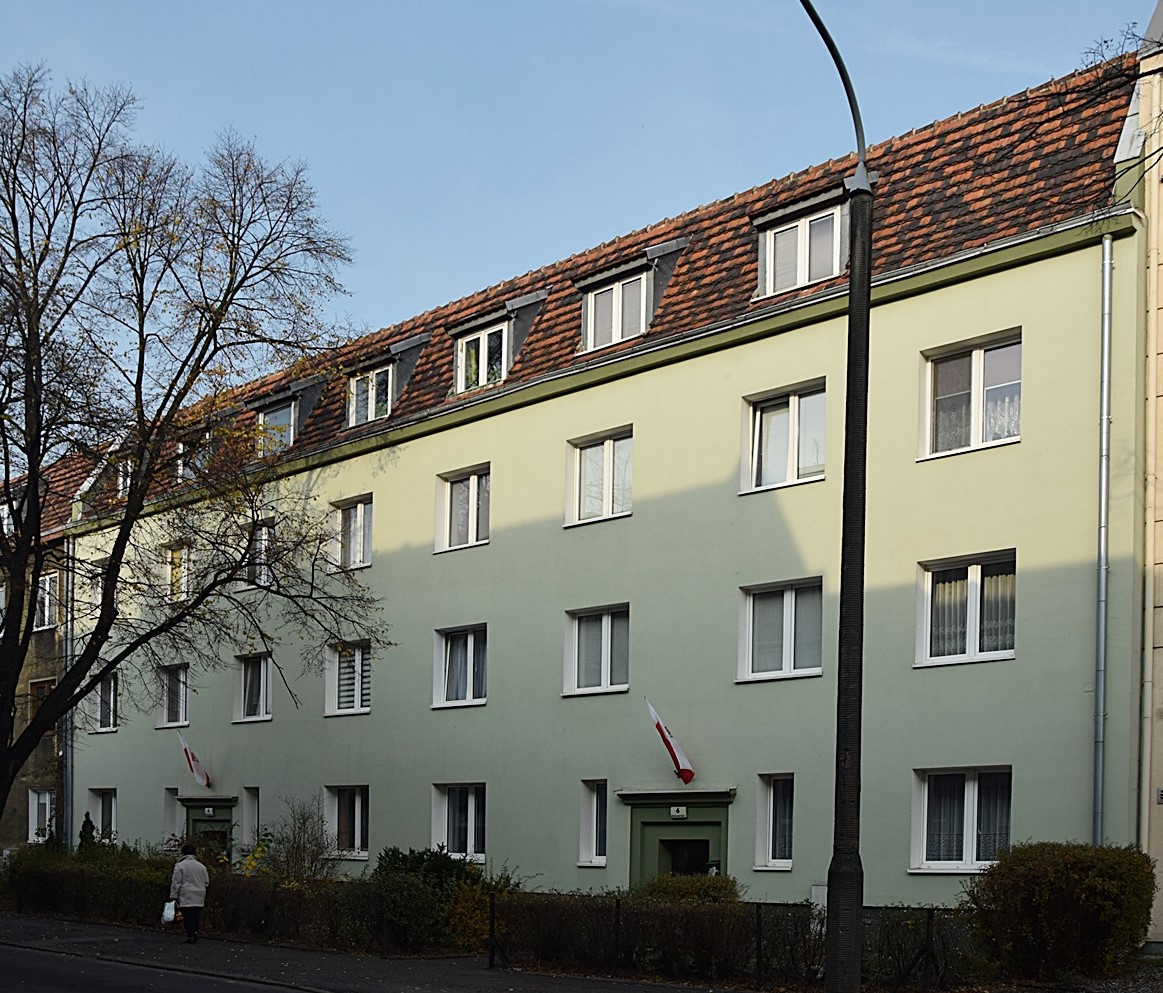
Facade at 6 Bocianowo

=== Tenement at 11 ===
1901

Early Modernism

The current building came after a previous edifice that has been standing here since the late 1890s. It has been first owned by Wilhelm Schüler, declared as a locksmith.

The tenement has been restored in 2021–2022, highlighting many architectural details: stuccoed motifs, festoons and a lavishly adorned portal with a plastered transom.

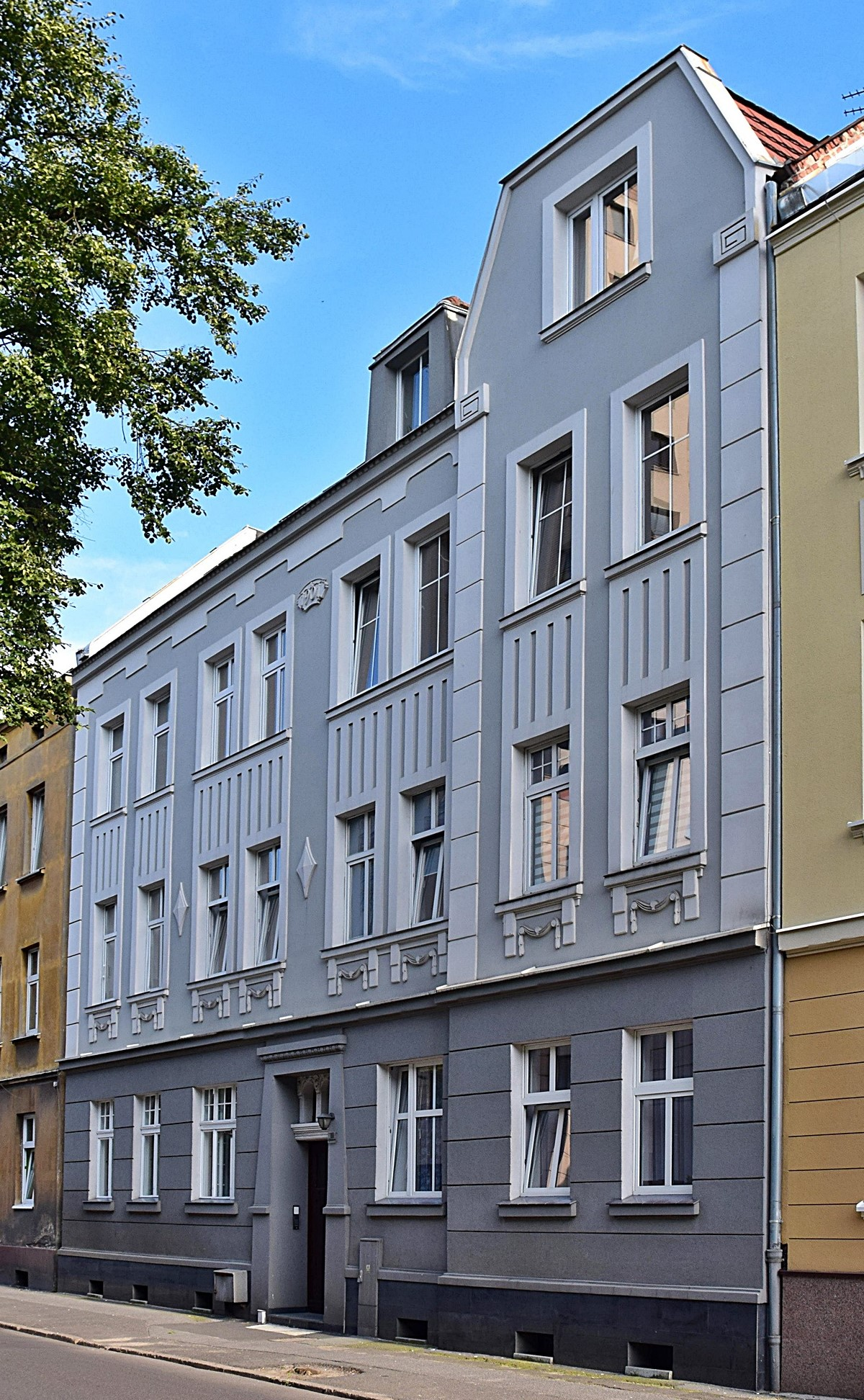
Elevation at 11

=== Tenement at 13 ===
1898, by Johannes Cornelius

Art Nouveau

Initially at 48 Brenkenhofs Straße, the building's landlord was Mr and Mrs Kolbe, working as restaurateurs.

Renovated in 2022, the tenement displays Art Nouveau style motifs and floral stuccos. The decoration around the entrance portal is particularly noticeable, as well as the wooden large door.

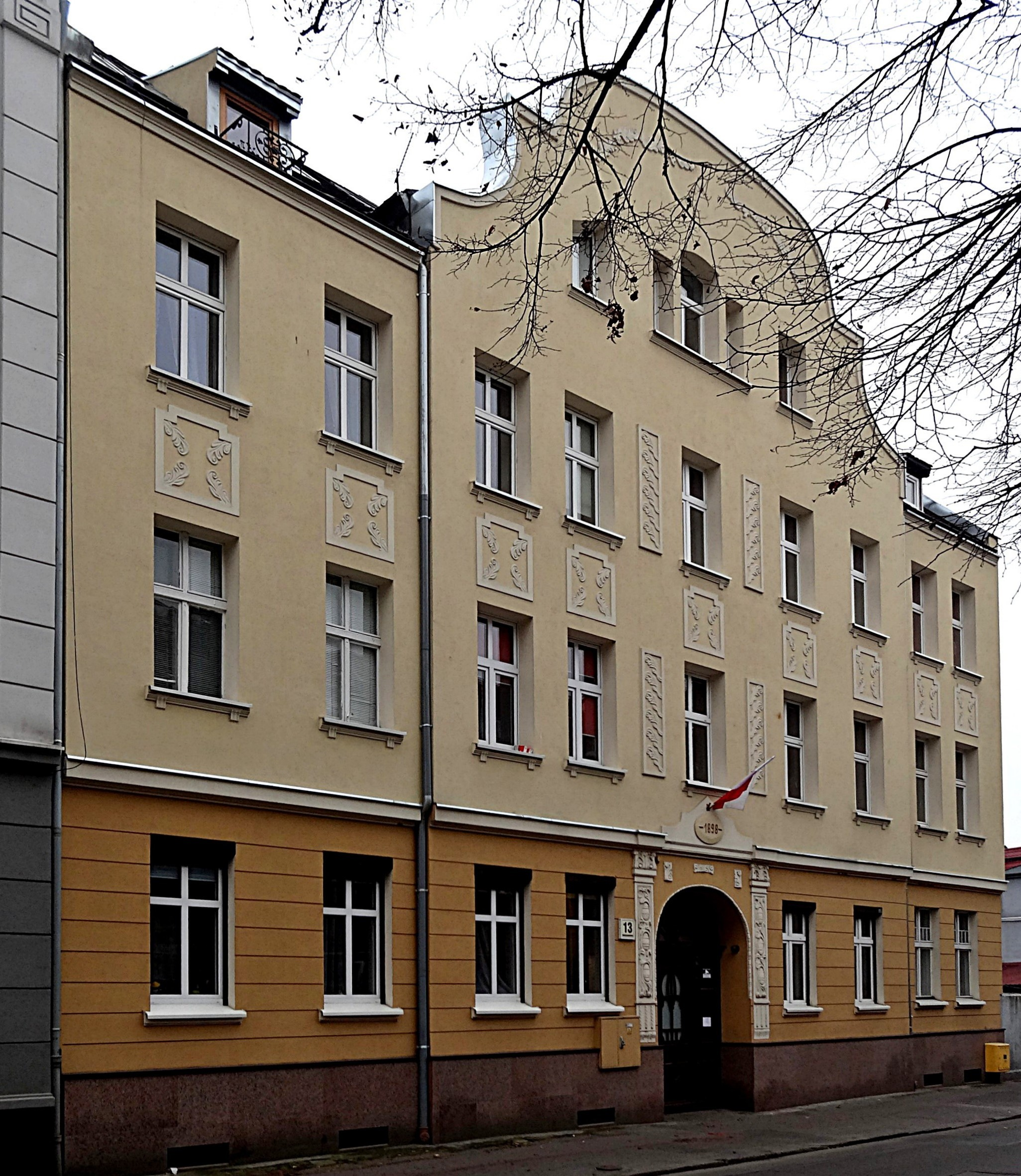
Facade at 13 Bocianowo

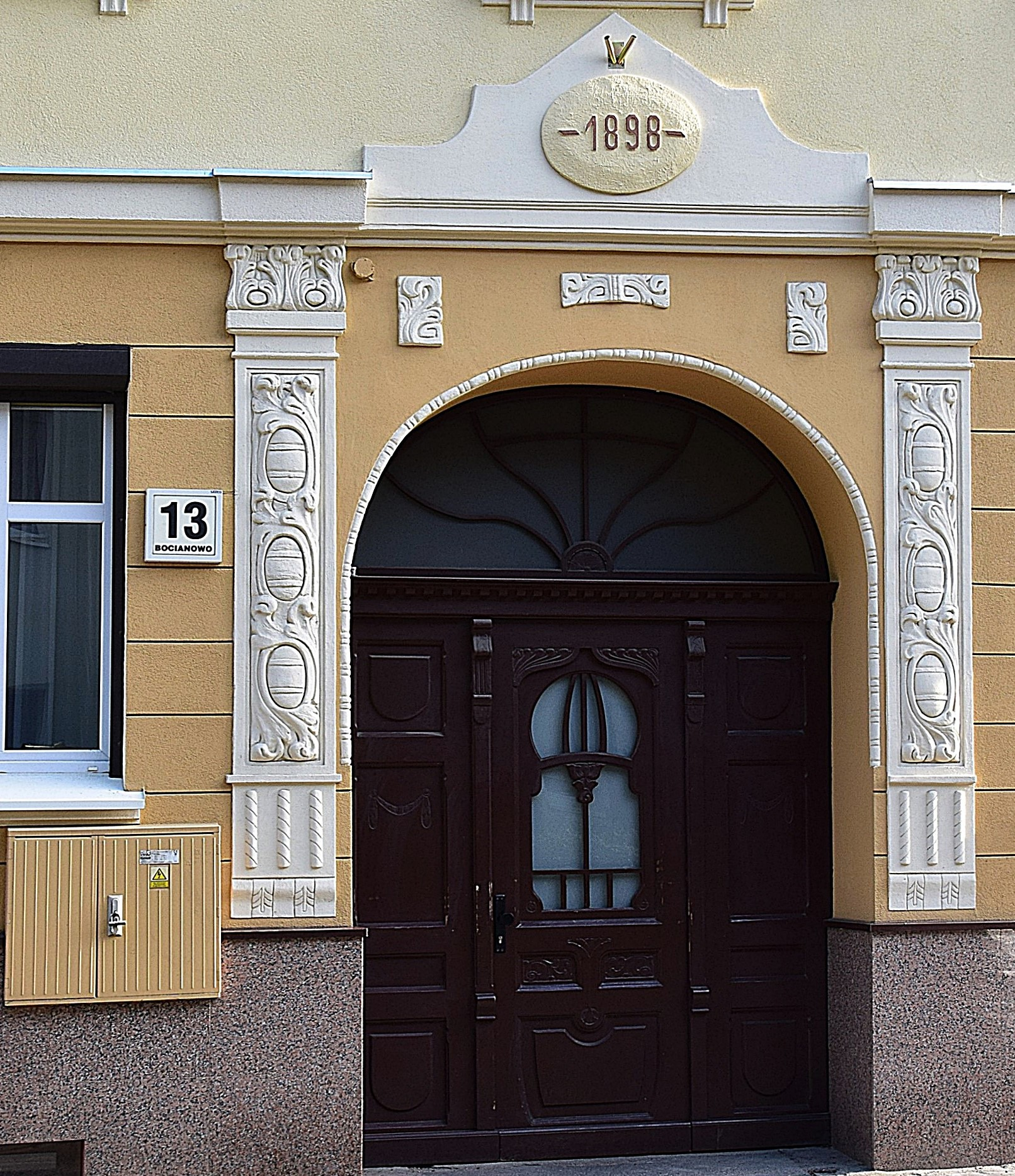
Entrance portal at 13

=== Tenement at 14, corner Racławiska Street ===
Late 1890s

Eclecticism

Cäsar Klettke, a butcher, owned this edifice from the end of the 19th century till the rebirth of Poland in 1920. He was living in the nearby house at today's Nr.21.

The elevations exhibit eclectic style, leaning on neo-classicist features.

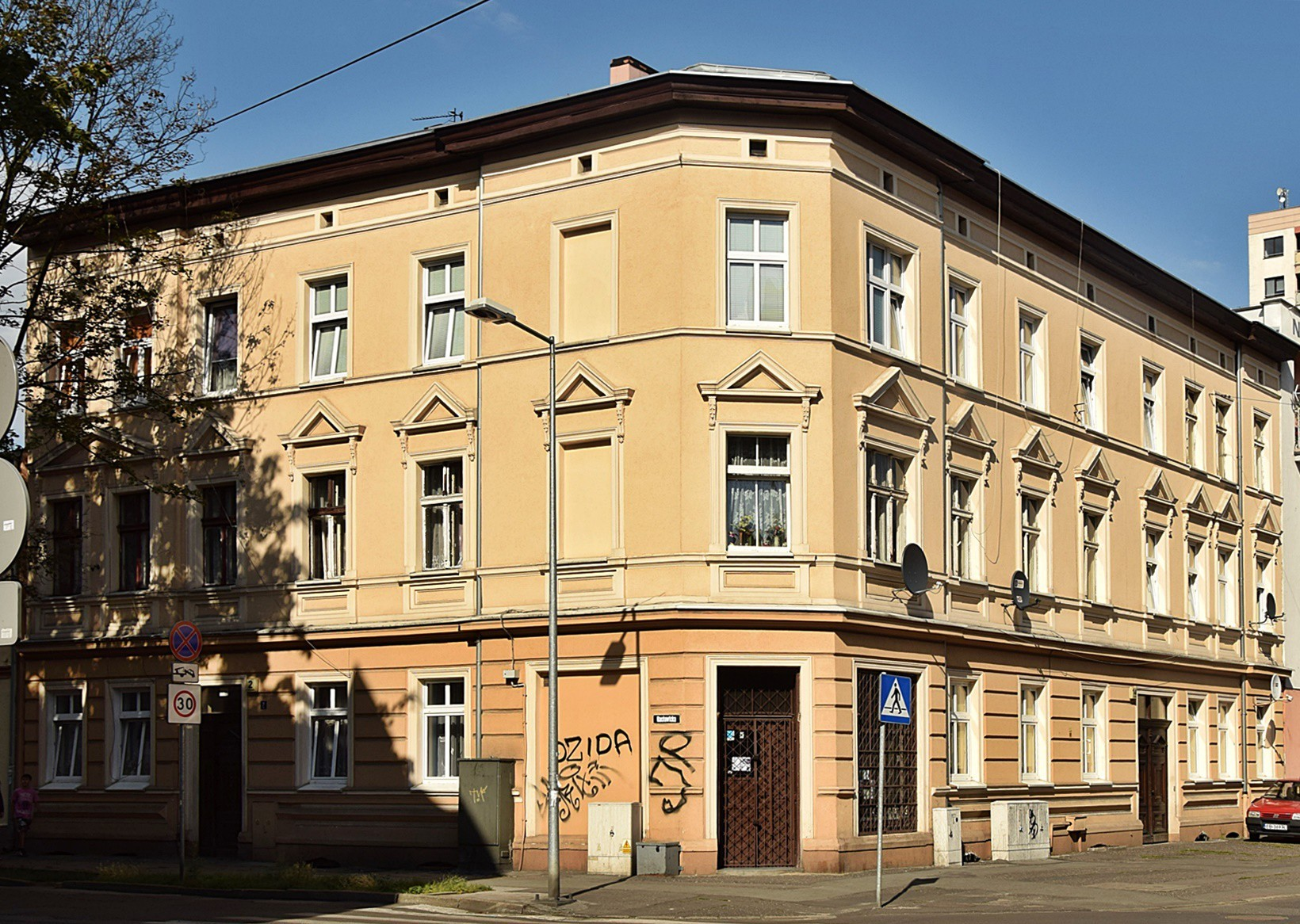
Corner view

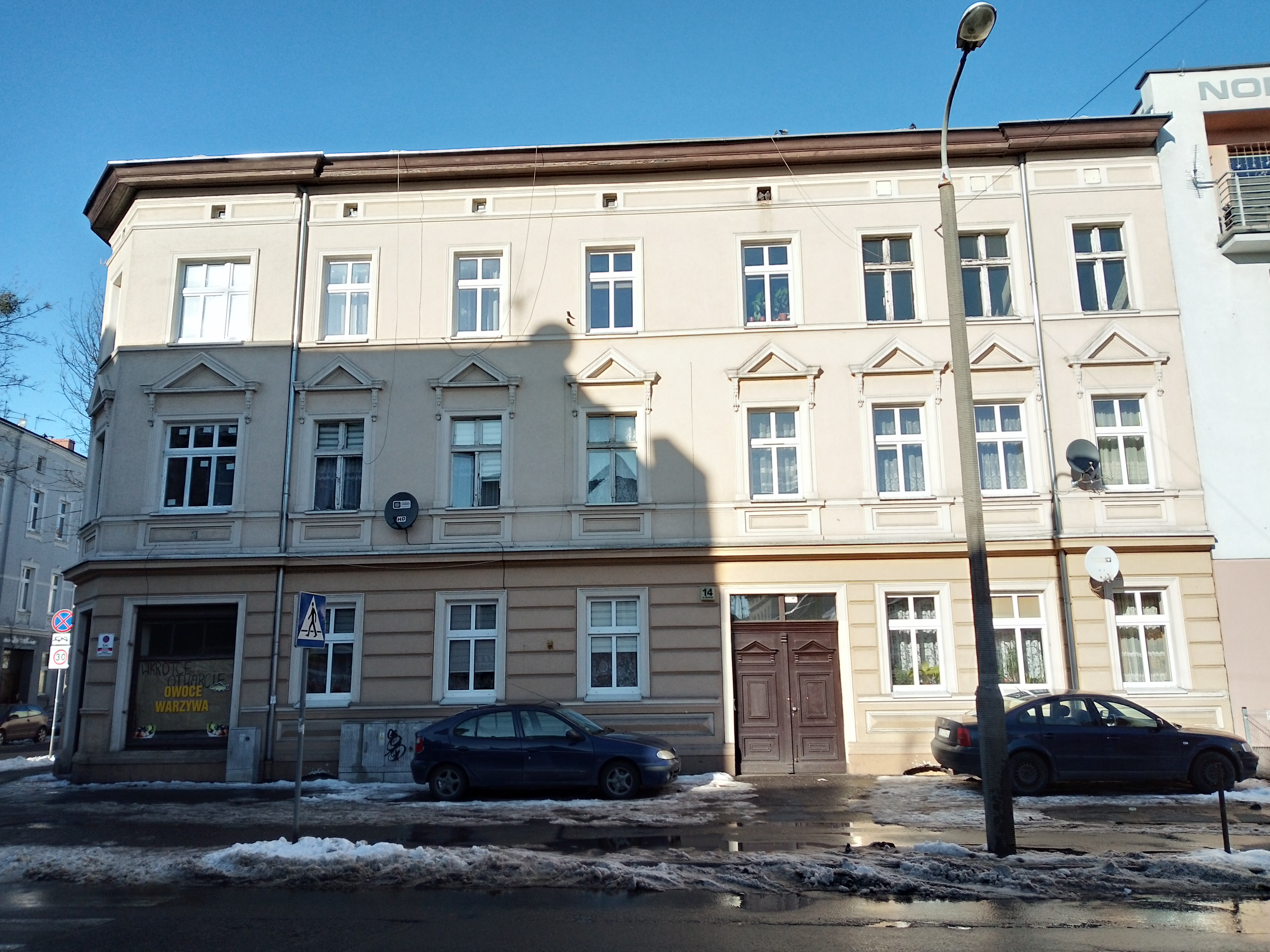
Facade on Bocianowo street

=== Building at 60 Sienkiewicza Street, corner with Bocianowo street ===
Late 1890s

Eclecticism

This long corner house was first owned by Johann ßalmowski, a baker. Today, a bakery still operates here: it is specialised in potato bread made with rye flour.

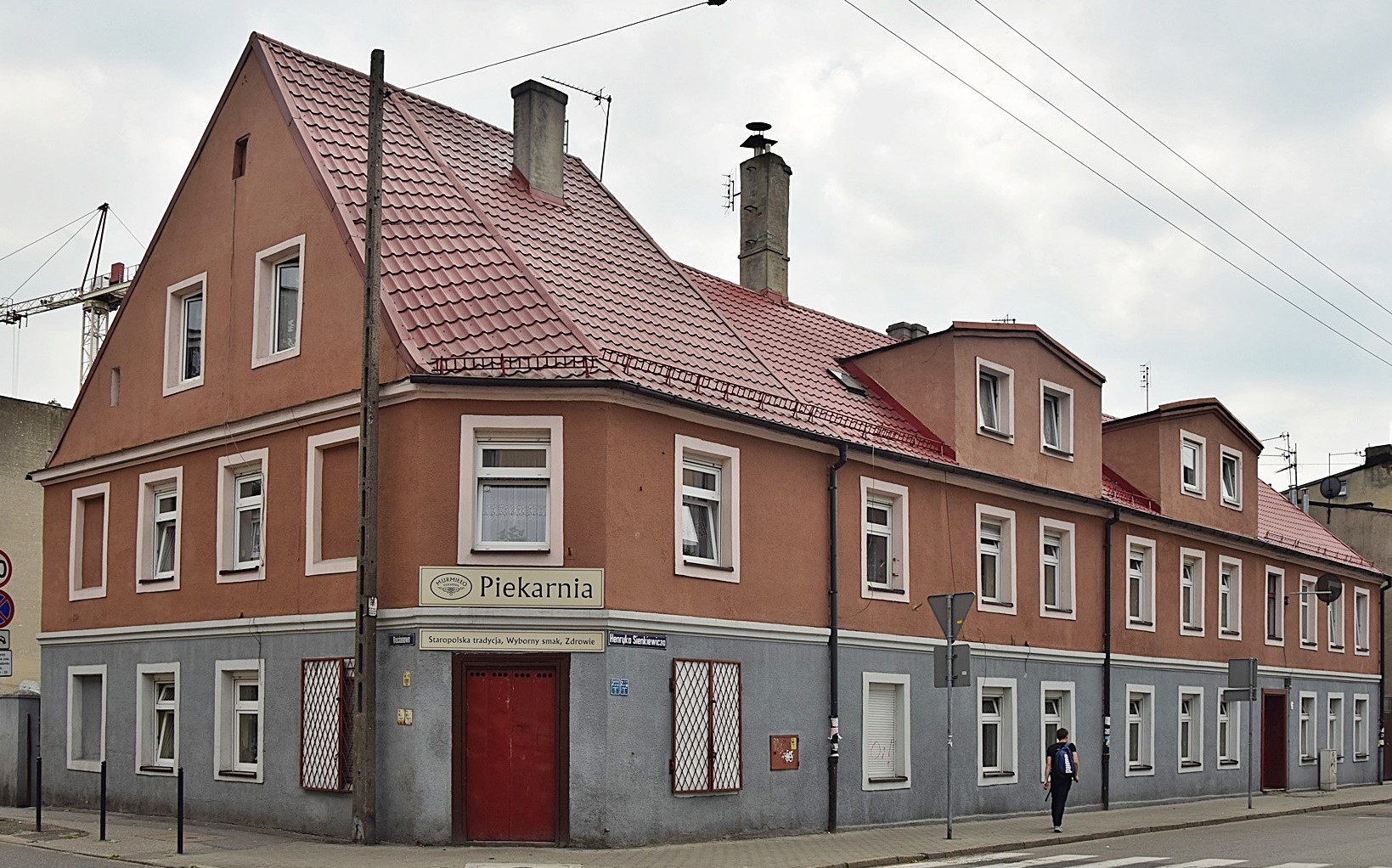
View of the corner house at 60 Sienkiewicza

=== House at 61 Sienkiewicza Street, corner with Bocianowo street ===
Late 1890s

Eclecticism

This building was an investment of the Brothers Hobberg: Wilhelm funded the edifice at 61 (Robert the one at 59). Wilhelm was a master carpenter.

The facades at Nr.61, on the corner with Bocianowo street, have unfortunately lost all their decoration.

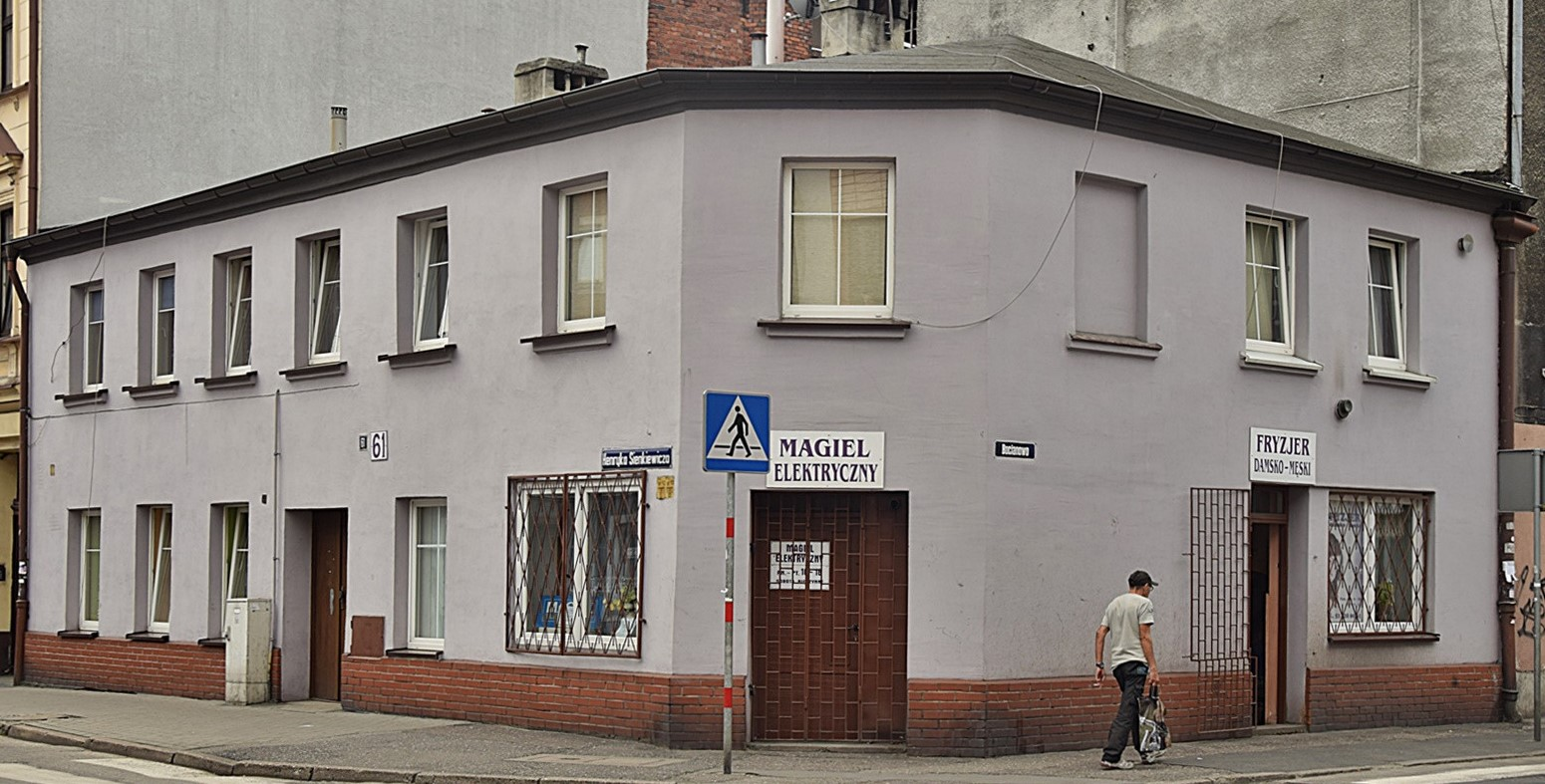
Corner house at 61

=== Tenement at 1 Racławiska Street, corner with Bocianowo street ===
Early 1880s, 1905

Eclecticism, Art Nouveau

This tenement, originally at 1 Wörth Straße, was the property of Julius Hanke; in 1890, Ferdinand Klatte purchased it and kept it till the turn of the 20th century.

The facades display few elements save for Art Nouveau adornment of the openings (stuccoed woman faces, vegetal motifs and festoons).

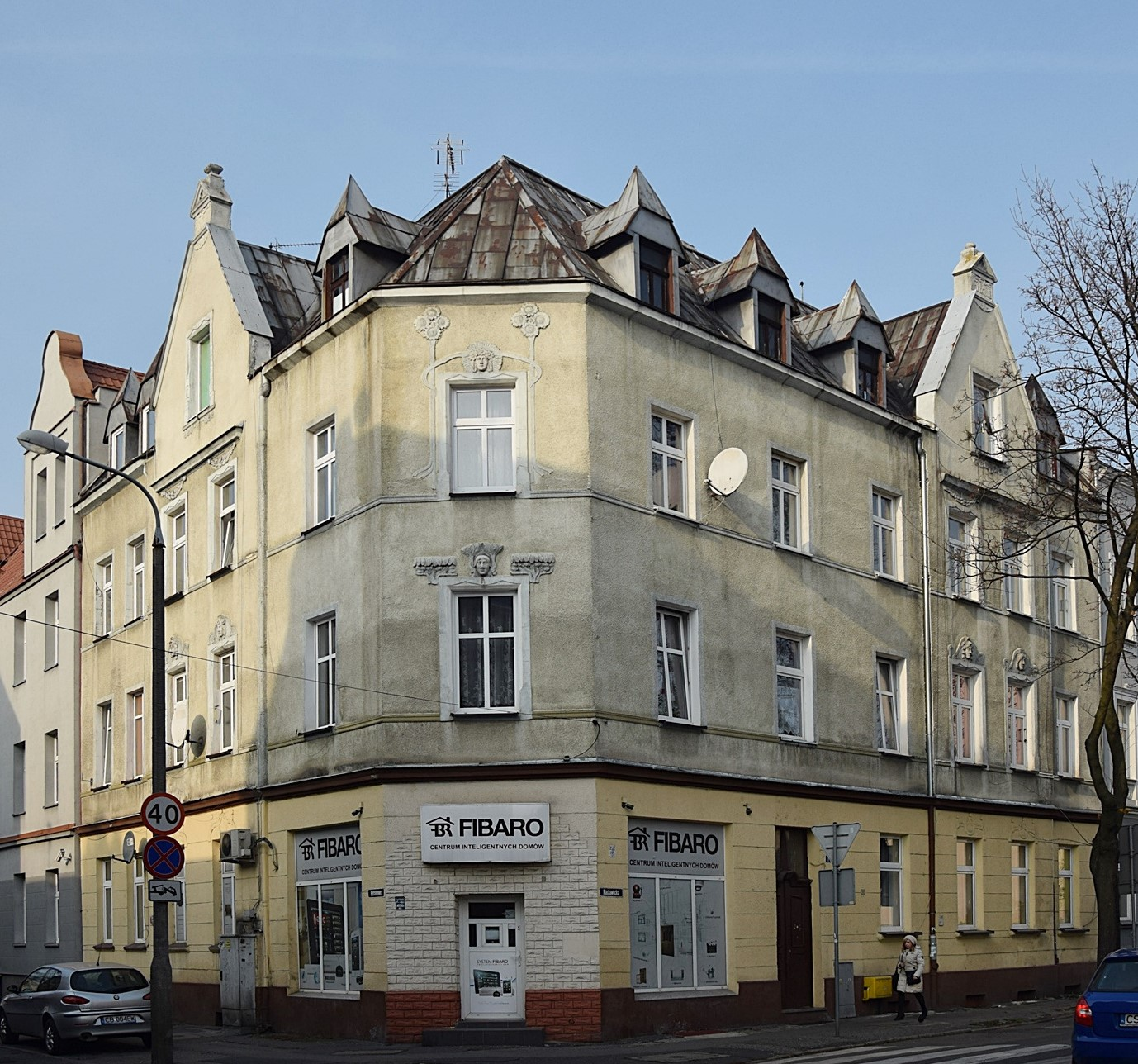
View from street intersection

=== Tenement at 16 ===
1909-1910

Art Nouveau

First landlord was Julius Schepull, an iron lathe operator. The 1910 address book mentions the building as new (German: Neubau).

The edifice lost all its Art Nouveau details and only kept its overall design with two ogee shaped wall gables.

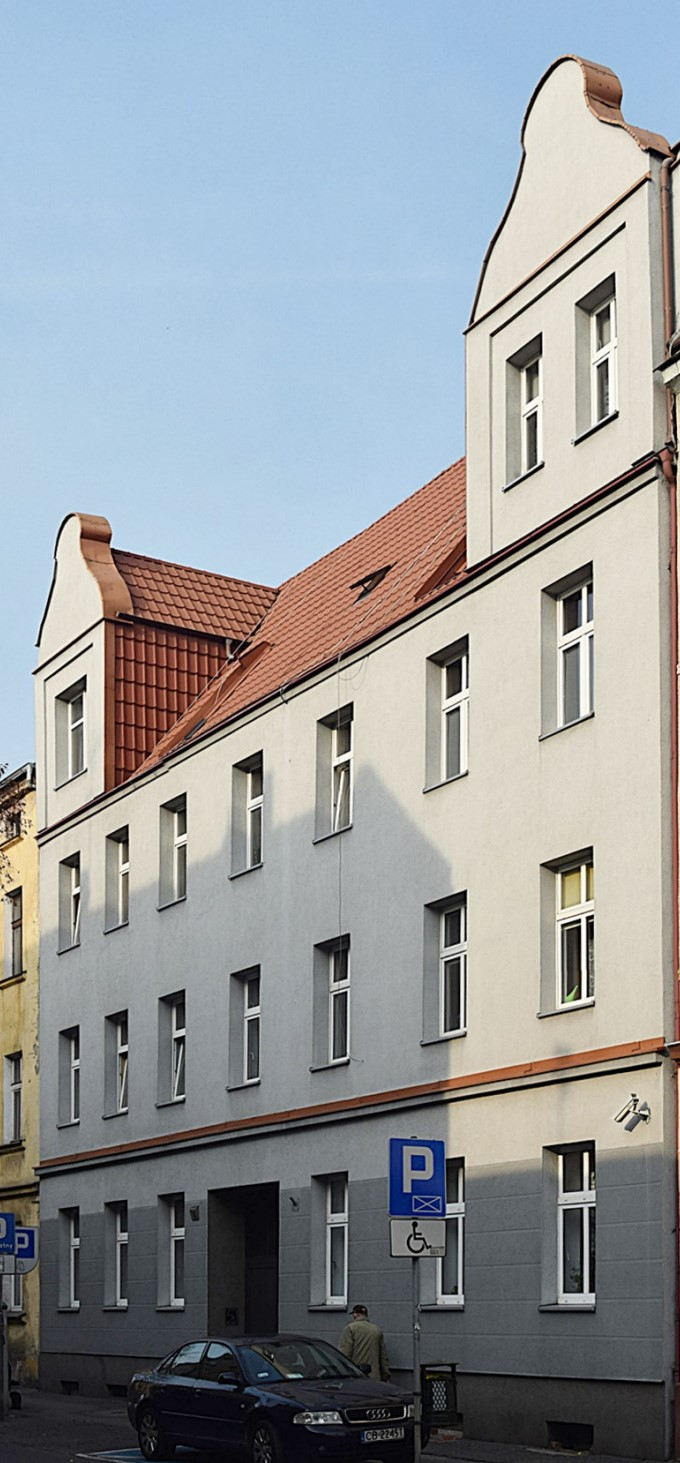
Main frontage

=== Tenements at 19 and 22/22a ===
1910-1911 (No19) 1907-1908 (No22/22a)

Art Nouveau

At the time of its construction, Nr.19 building was located at "33 Mittelstraße" (present day Sienkiewicza Street): its owner Friedrich Hohberg was running there a shop selling colonial goods (German: Kolonialwaren) and drugs. Nr.22/22a'sfirst owner was Julius Ischler.

Although worn, Nr.19 facade showcases a grand bay window topped by a terrace and a large ogee shaped wall gable. At Nr.22/22a, only remains a large Art Nouveau wooden entrance door.

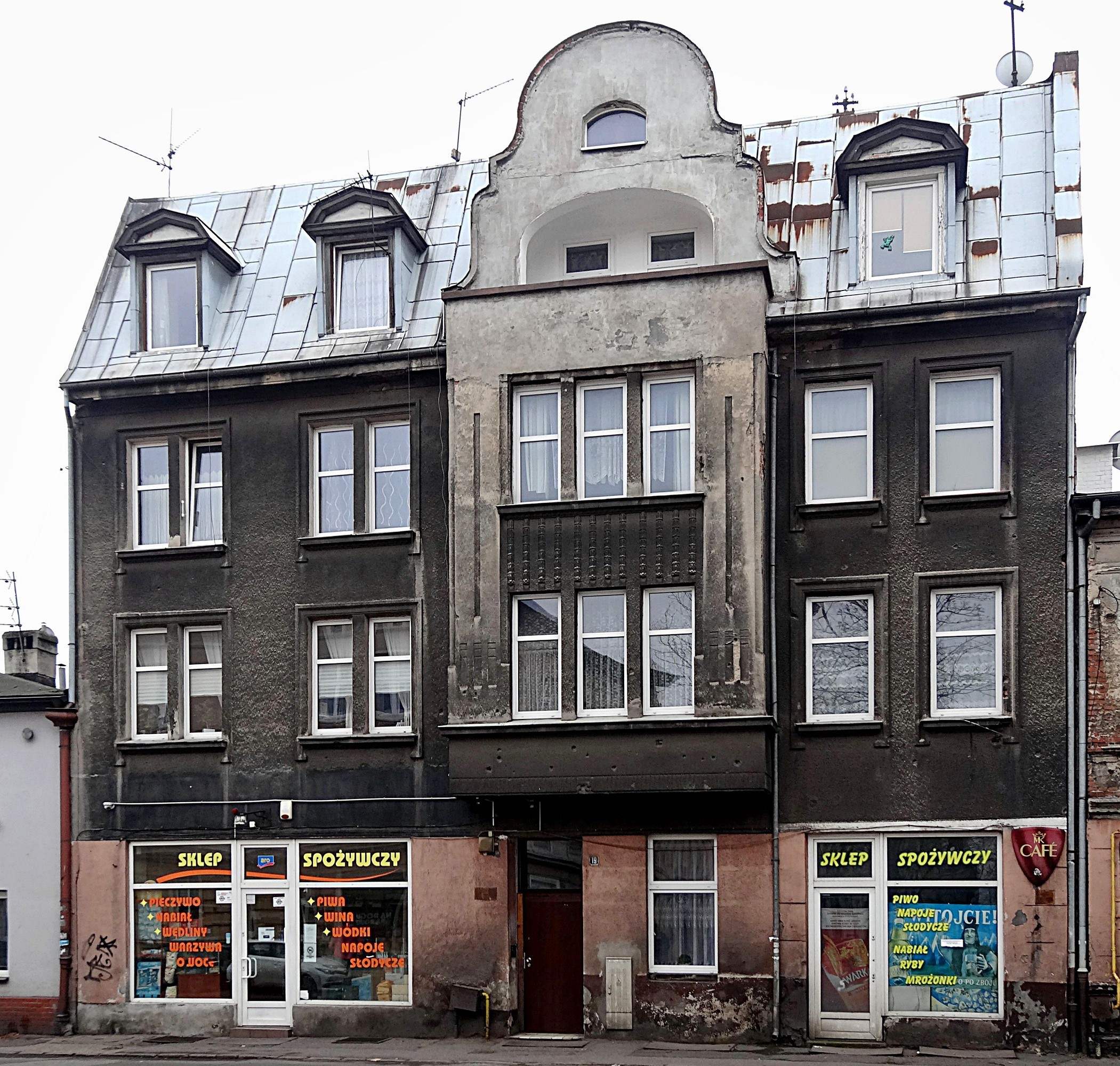
Nr.19 elevation on the street

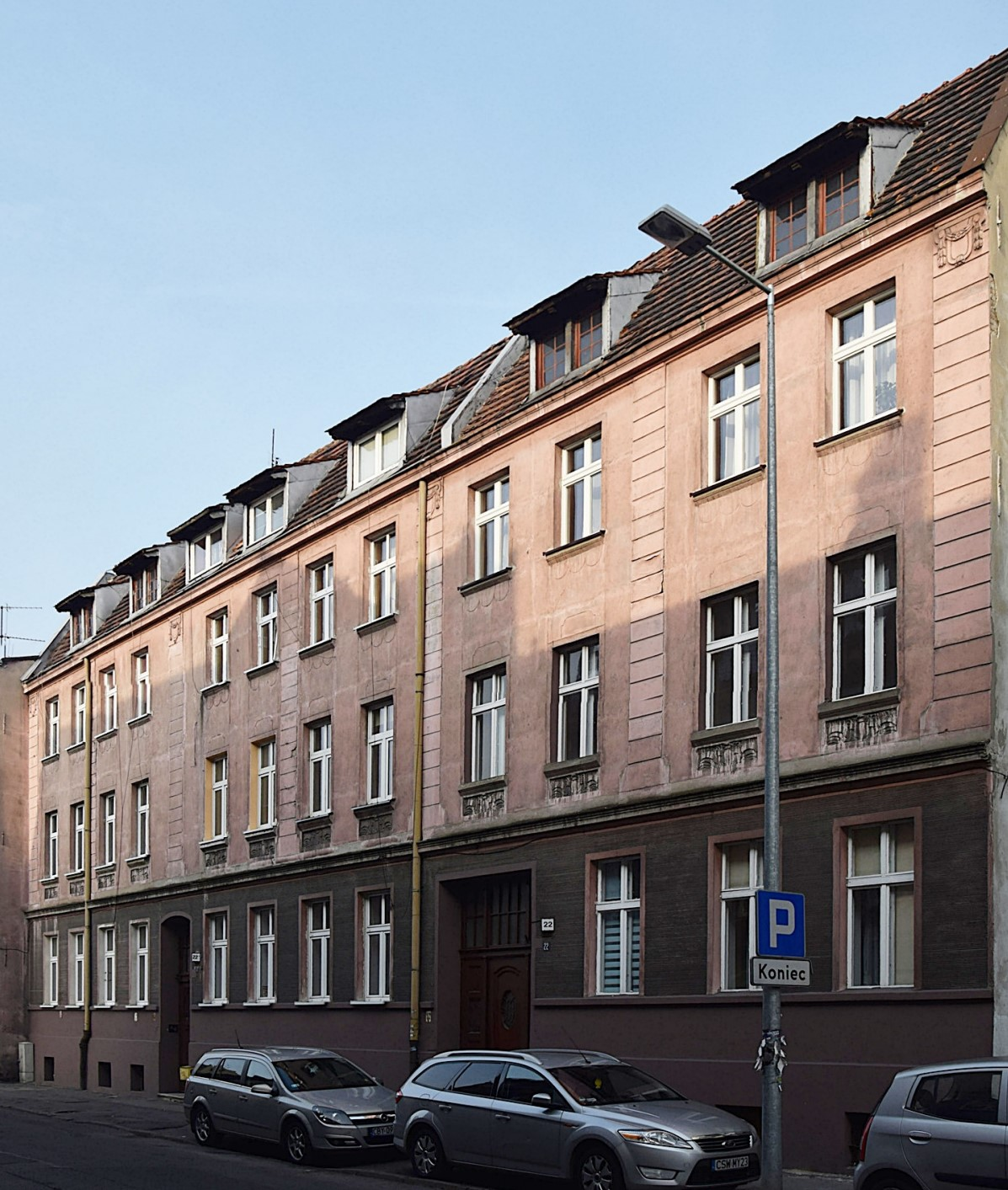
Frontage at 22/22a

=== Tenement at 21 ===
Late 1886

Eclecticism

Cäsar Klettke, a butcher, owned this building from the mid-1880s till 1910. In 1899, he also purchased another tenement in the street, at today's Nr.14.

Some of the detail on the one-storey edifice has been worn away over time, but the original locations of cartouches, as well as the plastered decoration of window jambs and lintels, are still discernable.

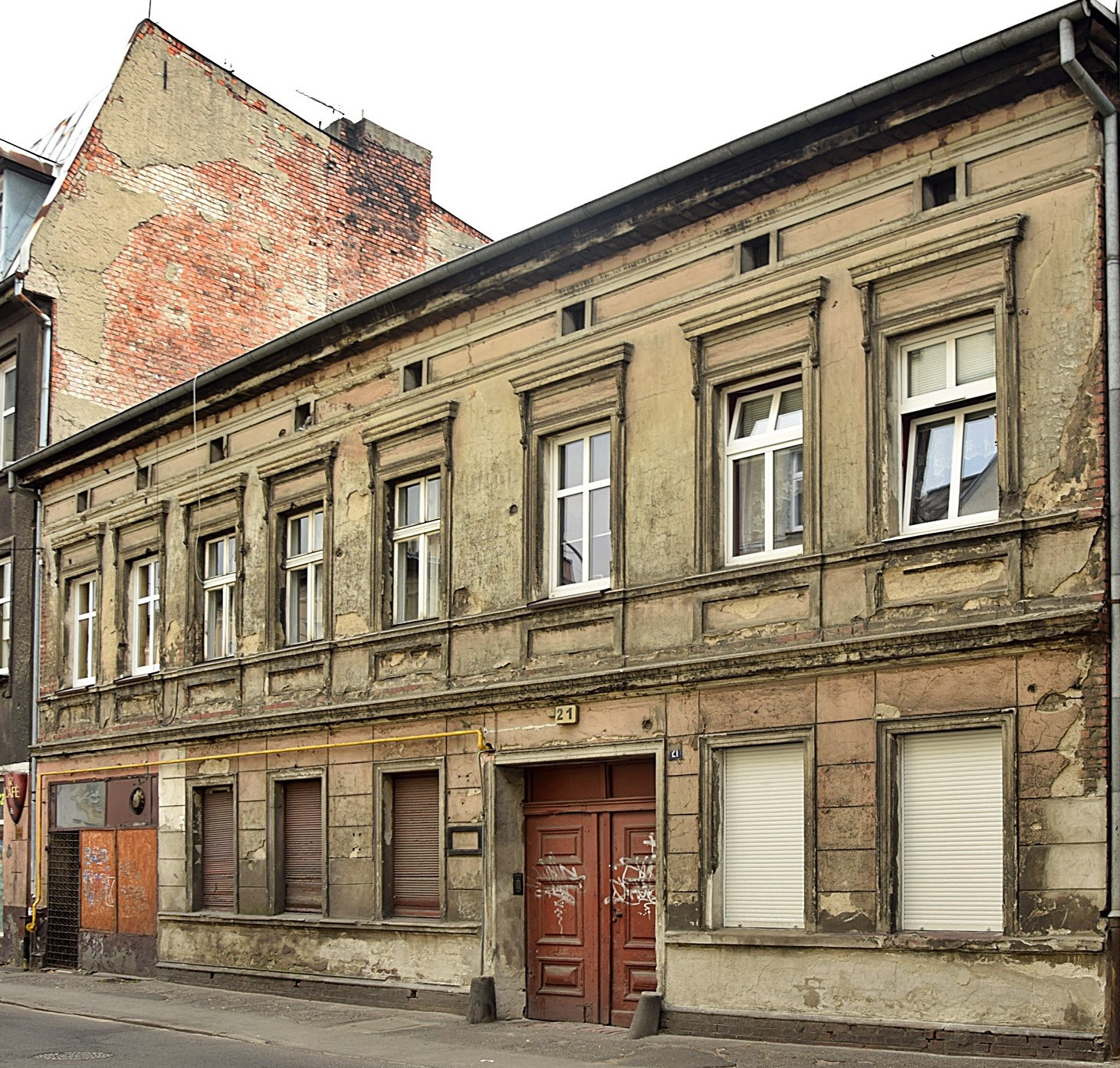
Main frontage

=== Tenement at 23 ===
1907-1908

Eclecticism

The building has the specificity to have been funded by the Prussian state railways at the start of the 20th century, housing railway workers from the neighbouring rail lines and stations. After the re-creation of the Polish state, the tenement briefly moved into the hands of the State Treasury (Polish: Dom Skarbowy) before coming back to the ownership of the Polish State Railways.

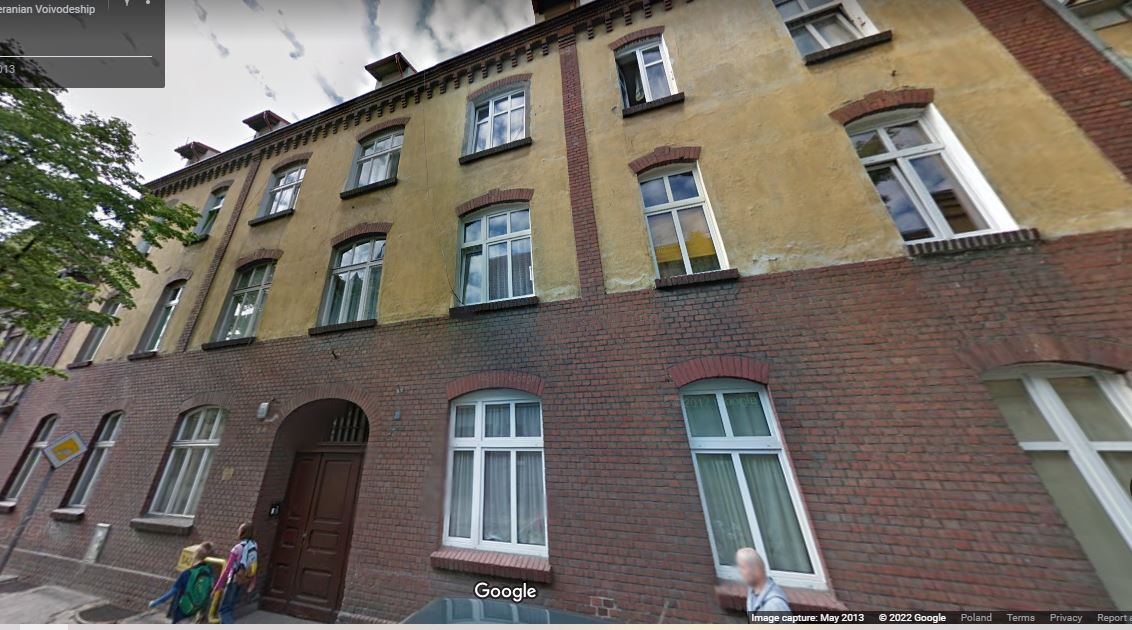
Elevation from the street

=== Tenement at 24 and mural ===
1895-1896

Eclecticism

Initial address was 26 Brenkenhoff Straße, the first landlord being Carl Görke, a railtransport brakeman.

The elevation presents nice details, from the bossage on the ground floor, to the adorned pedimented windows to the corbel table running on the top.

The side wall of the building has been embellished since 2012 by a mural called "Miś" (English: Bear). It was designed by Bartosz Bujanowski from Bydgoszcz and Łuksza Berżer from Wrocław as the result of street art classes attended by local children and adolescents.

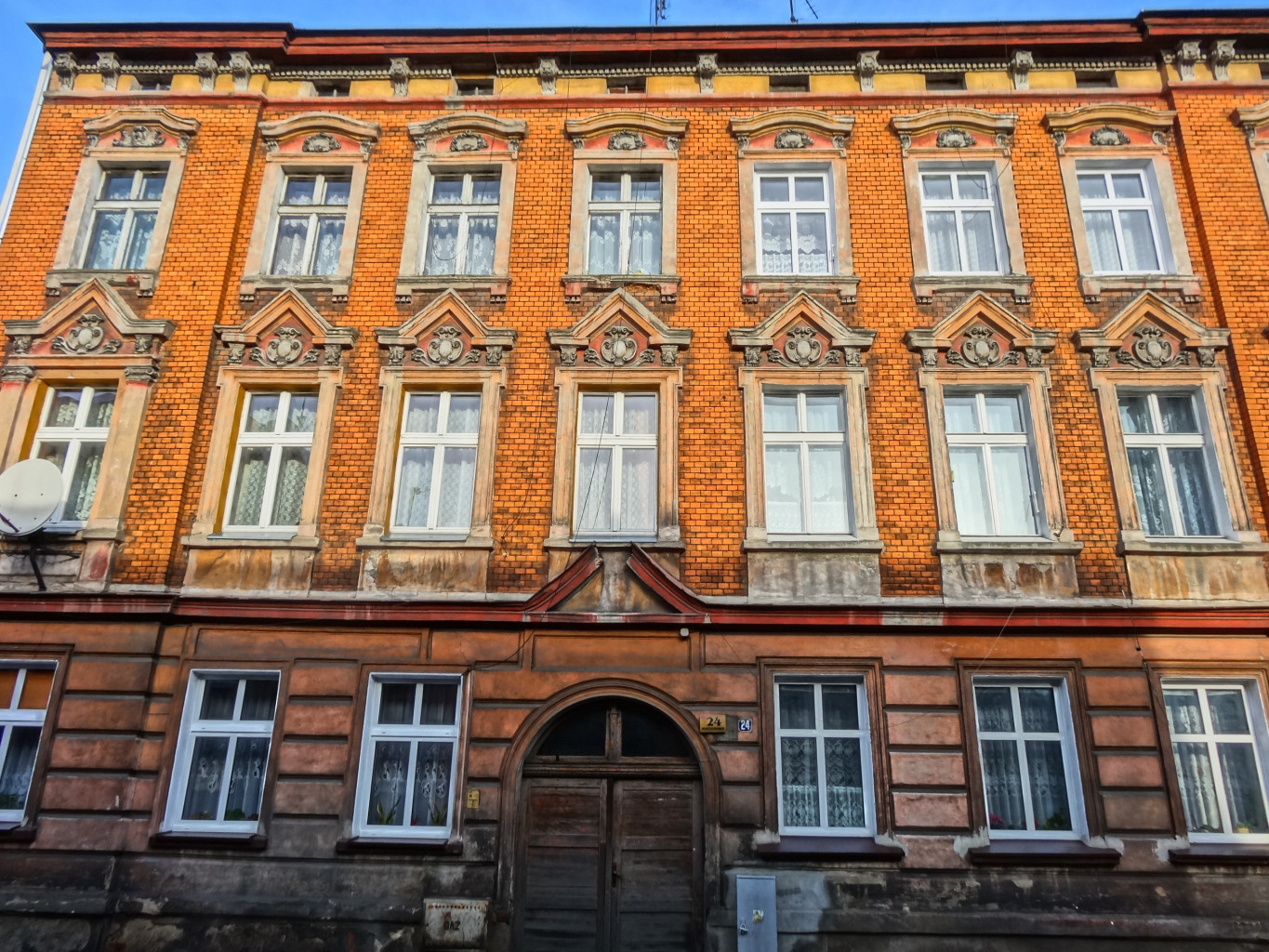
Main frontage

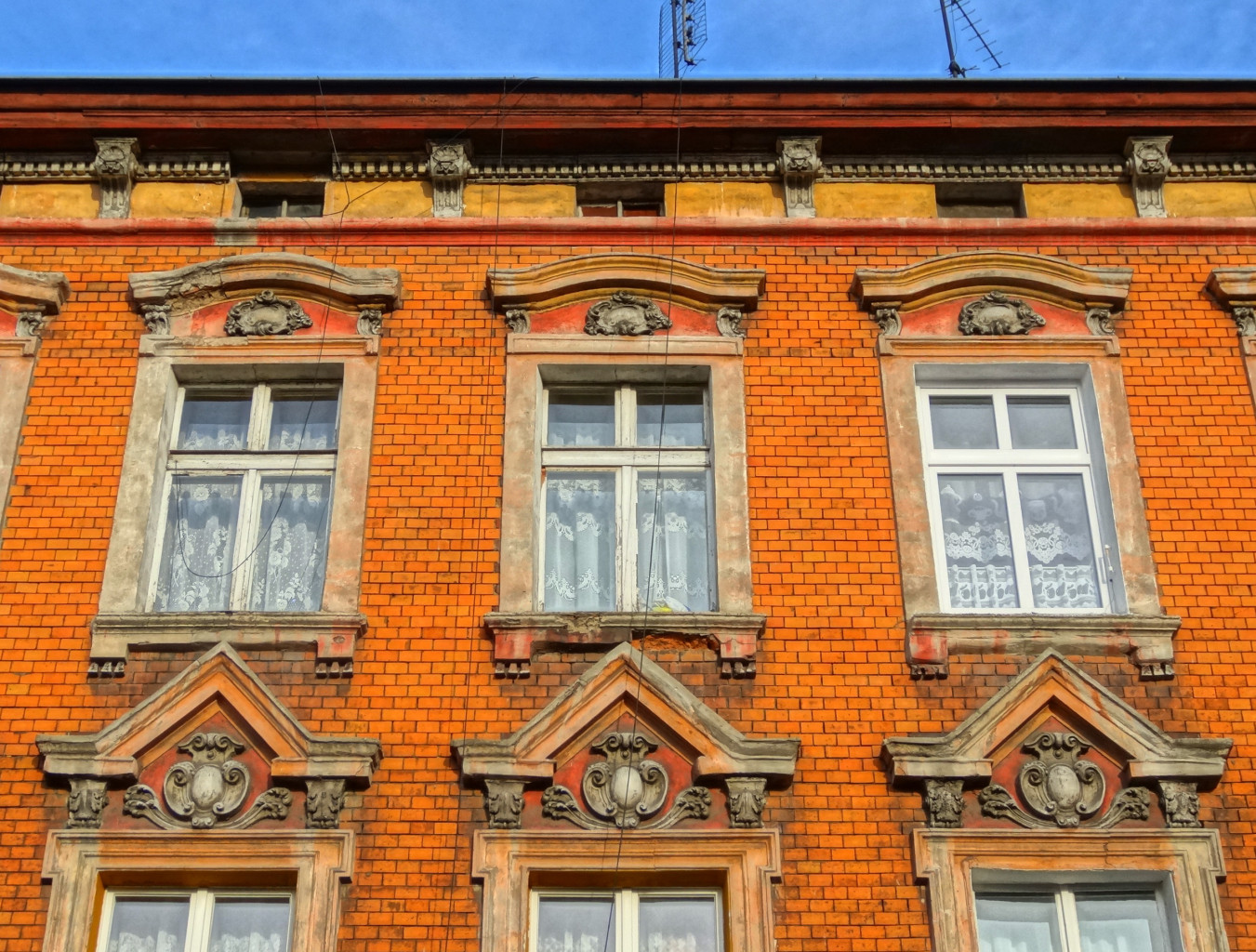
Detail of the facade decoration

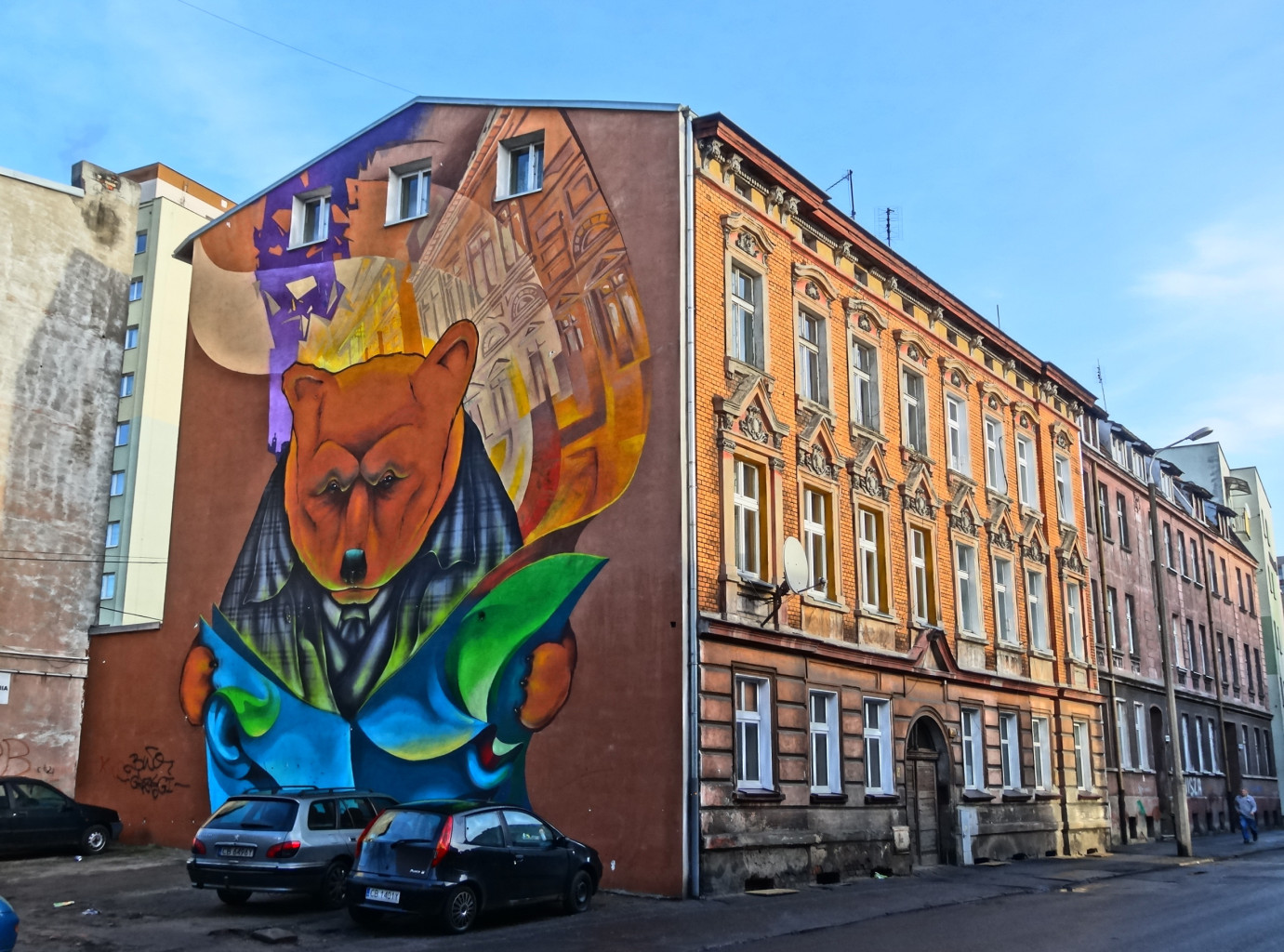
View of the side mural

=== Tenement at 27 ===
Late 1895-1896

Eclecticism

The building was commissioned by Gottfried Scholz.

Very few details from the eclectic facade remain, apart from the stuccos of the window jambs and lintels.

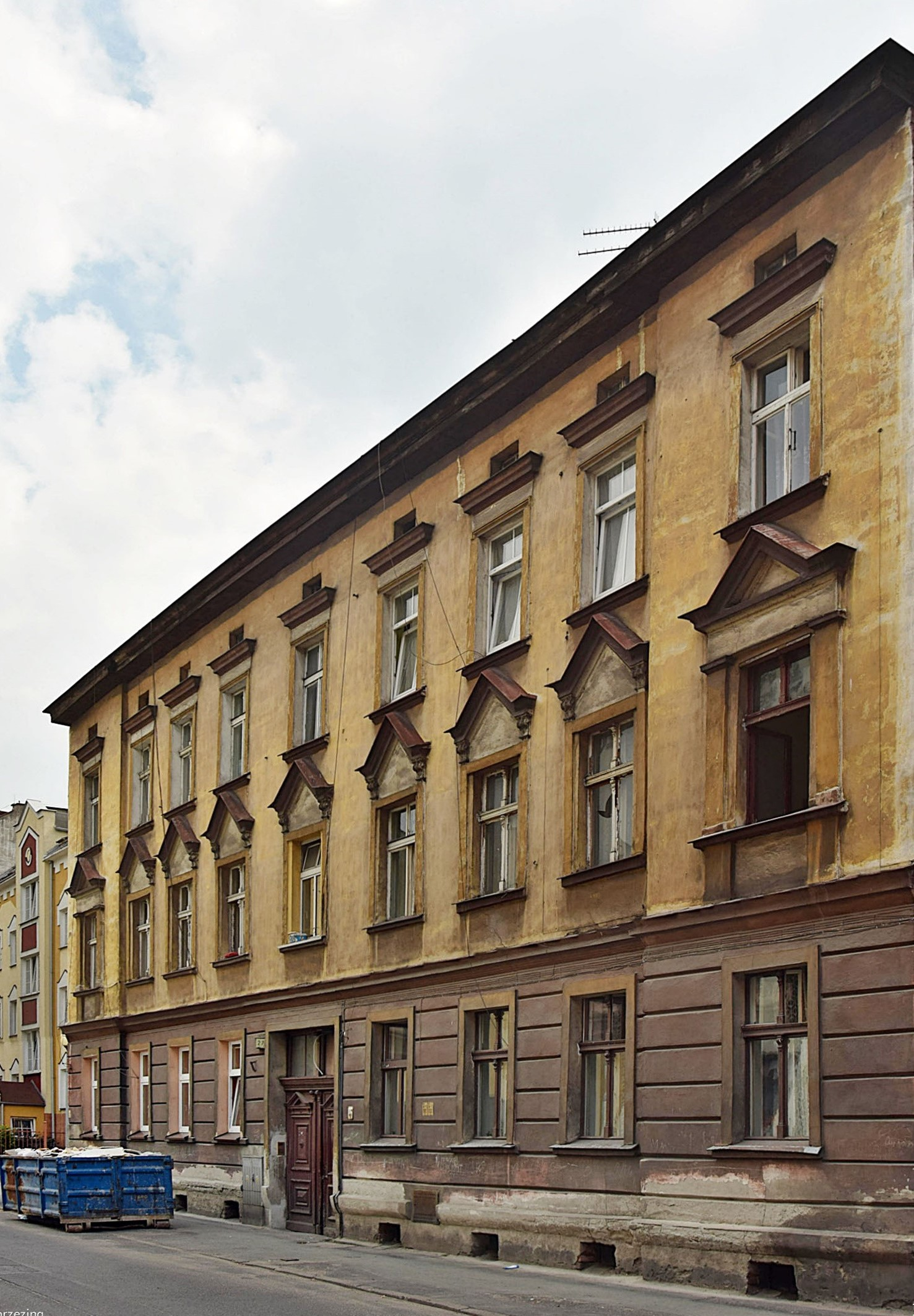
Facade at Nr.27

=== Tenement at 29 ===
1913-1915

Late Art Nouveau

The first registered owner was Carl Thiede, a butcher.

The facade is progressively losing its Art Nouveau features by lack of renovation. One can discern floral motifs flanking the entrance door as well as shape vegetal designs in cartouches on the bottom of both bay windows.

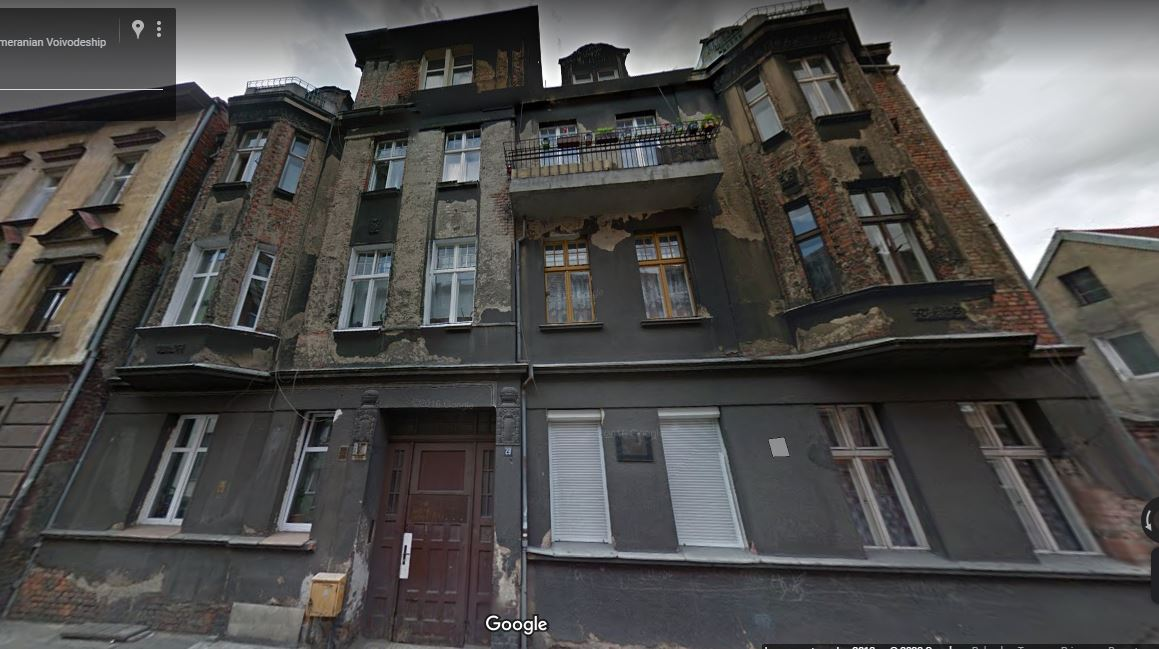
Elevation on the street

=== Tenement at 30 and 32 (corner with Rycerska street) ===
1903 (30) 1904 (32)

Art Nouveau

Carl Hofmann, a restaurateur, was the first landlord of these buildings. At that time (1905) he also owned abutting tenement at Nr.28 where he lived.

The main frontage of Nr.30 is arguably one of the best preserved in the street. Art Nouveau motifs are not only present all over the curved wooden front door, but also on the balcony, the bay windows, around the windows and on the top of the facade.

The tenement at Nr.32 is most noticeable by its dramatic corner bay window similar to a bartizan, crowned by an onion dome roof, reminding of similar buildings in Bydgoszcz (e.g. at 8 and 27 Swiętej Trojcy Street or at 1 Plac Wolności). It was restored in 2021.

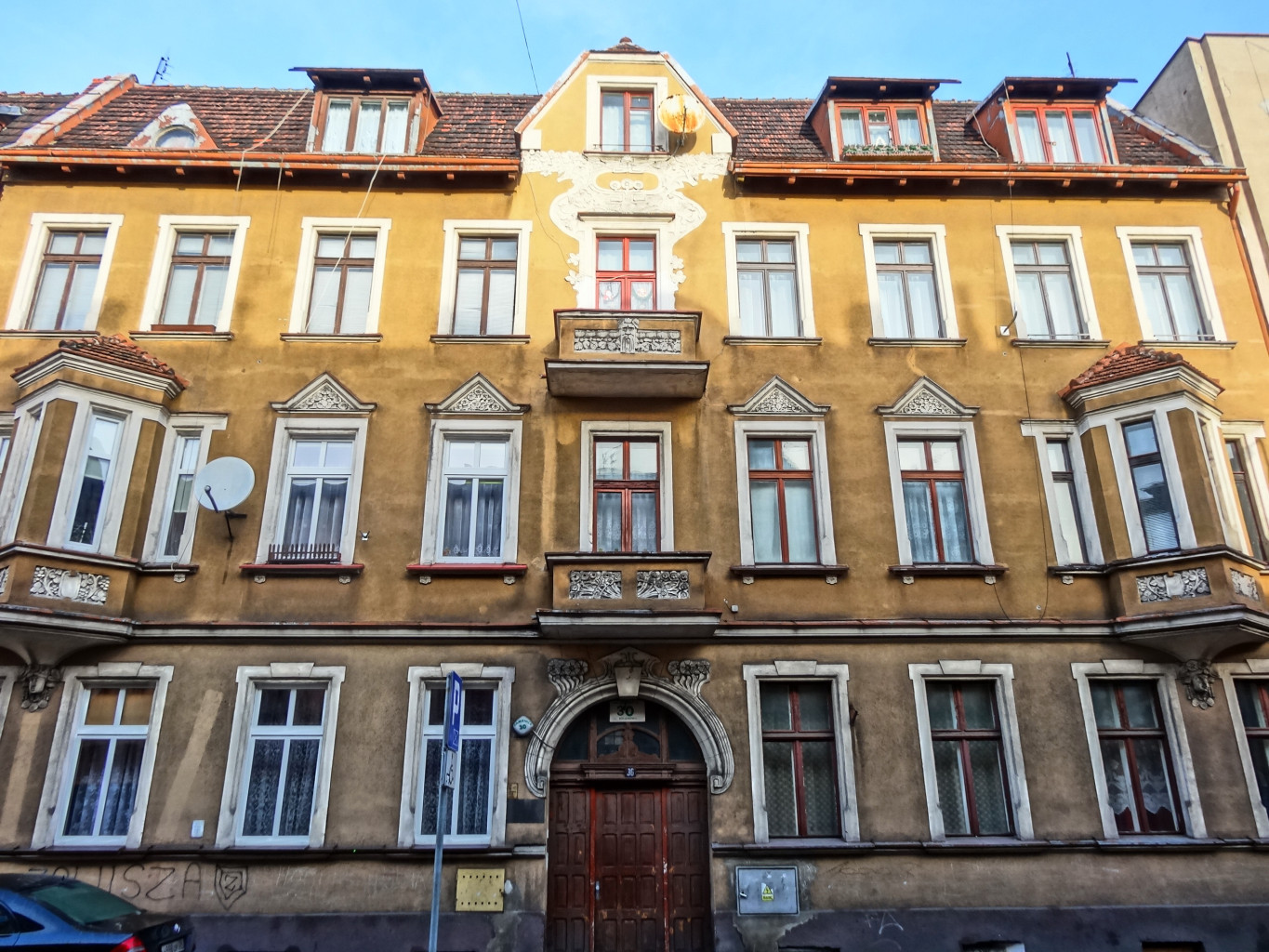
Main frontage of Nr.30

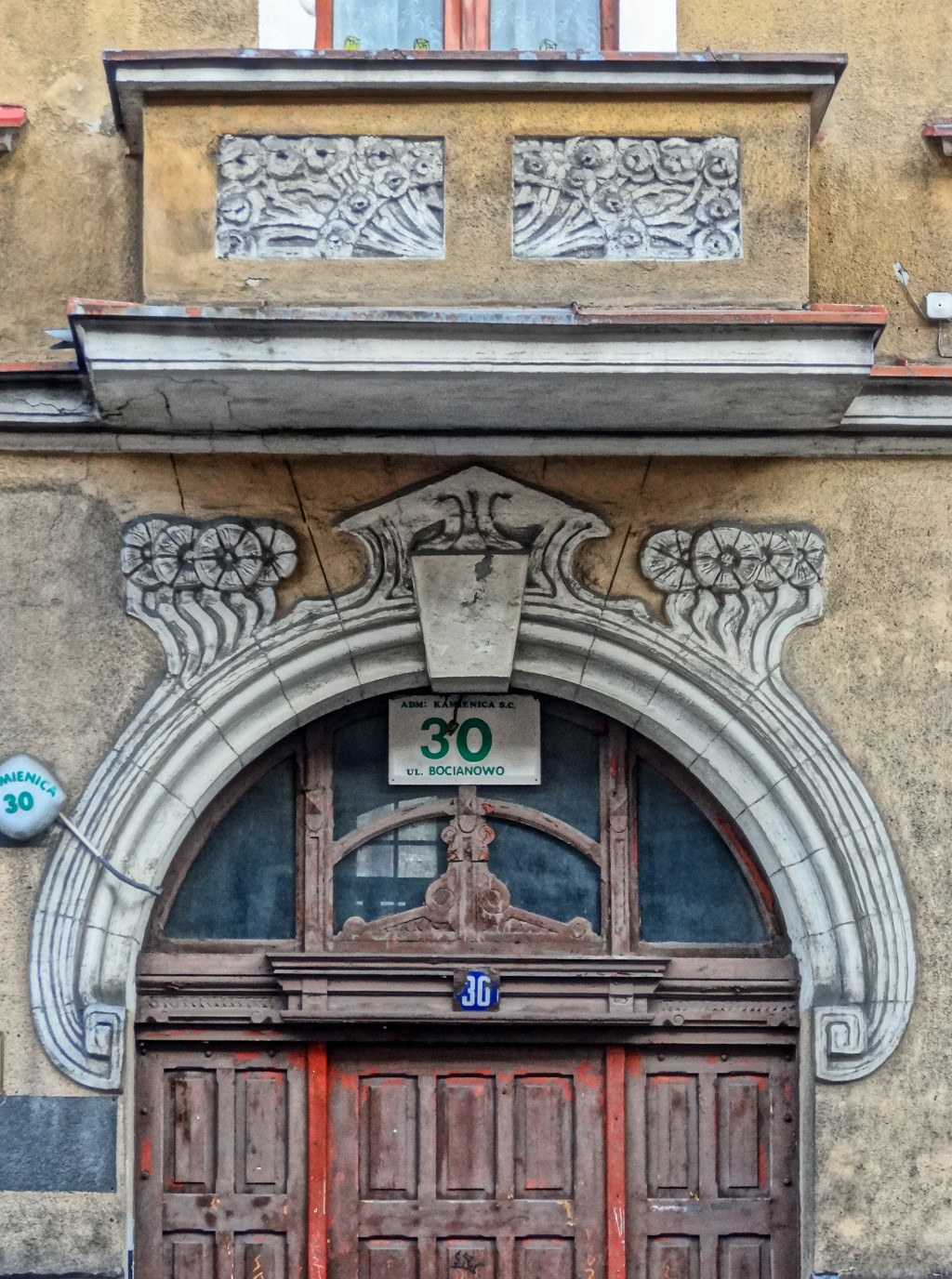
Portal details (Nr.30)

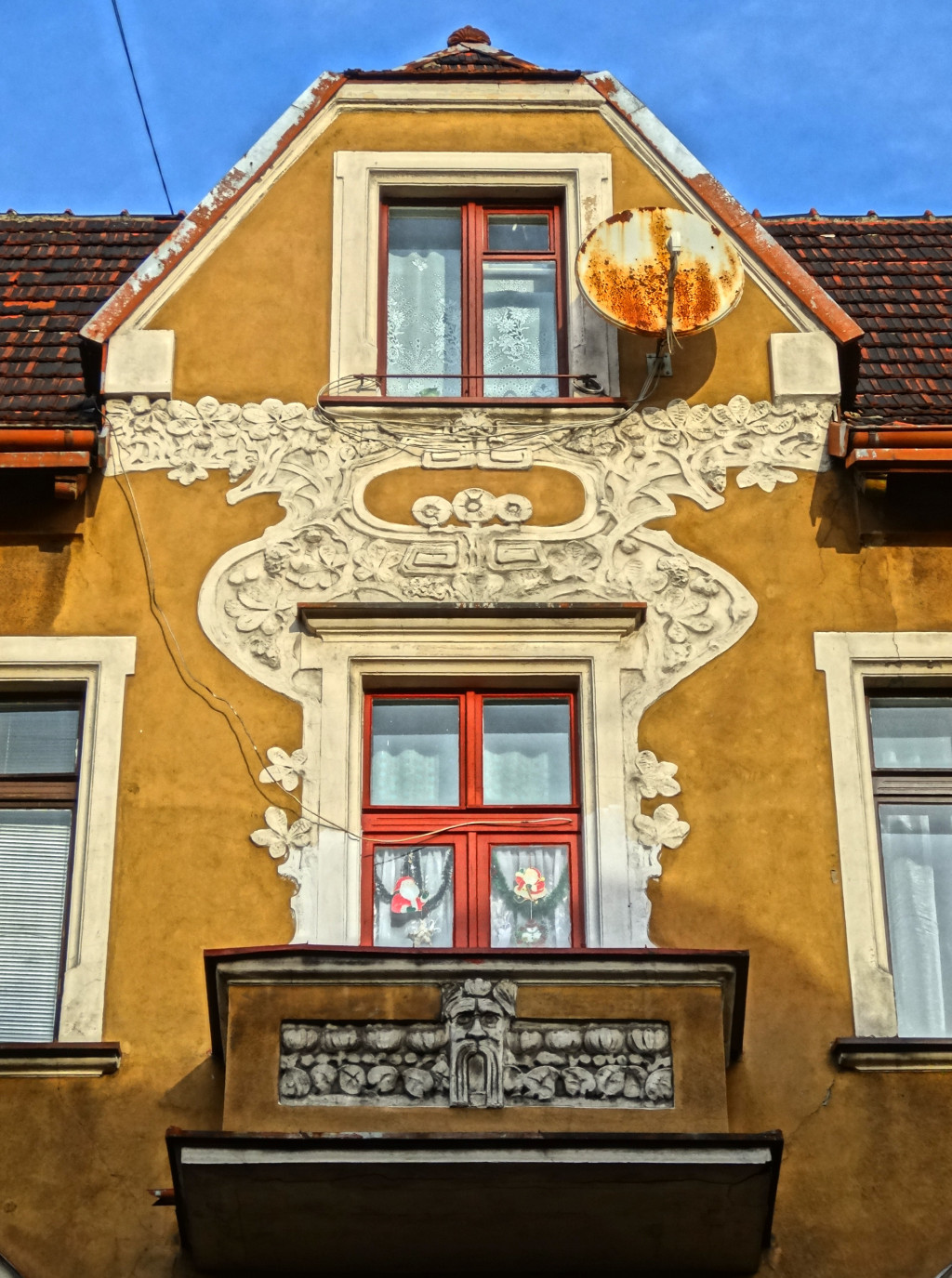
Top facade (Nr.30)

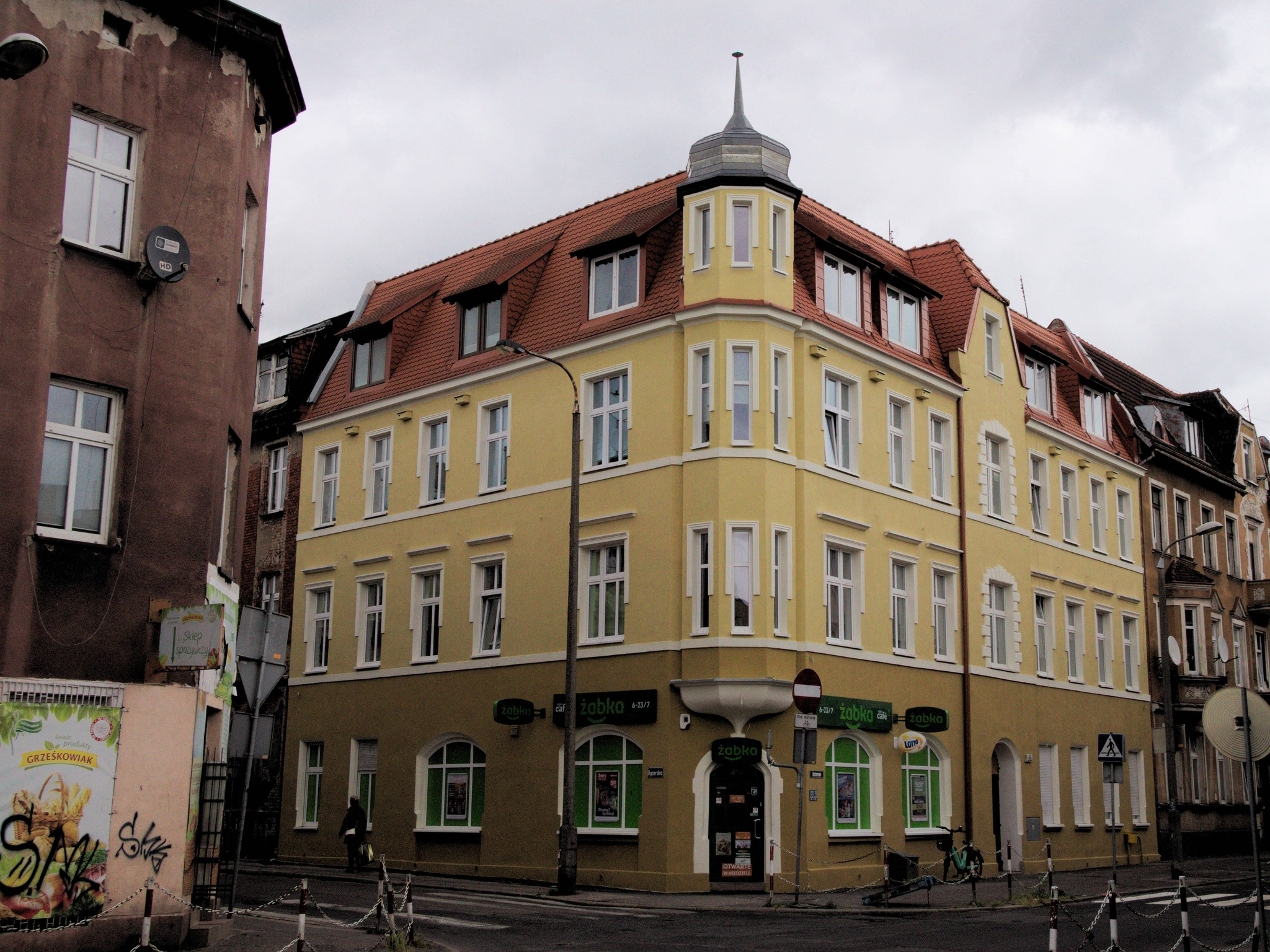
Corner tenement at Nr.32

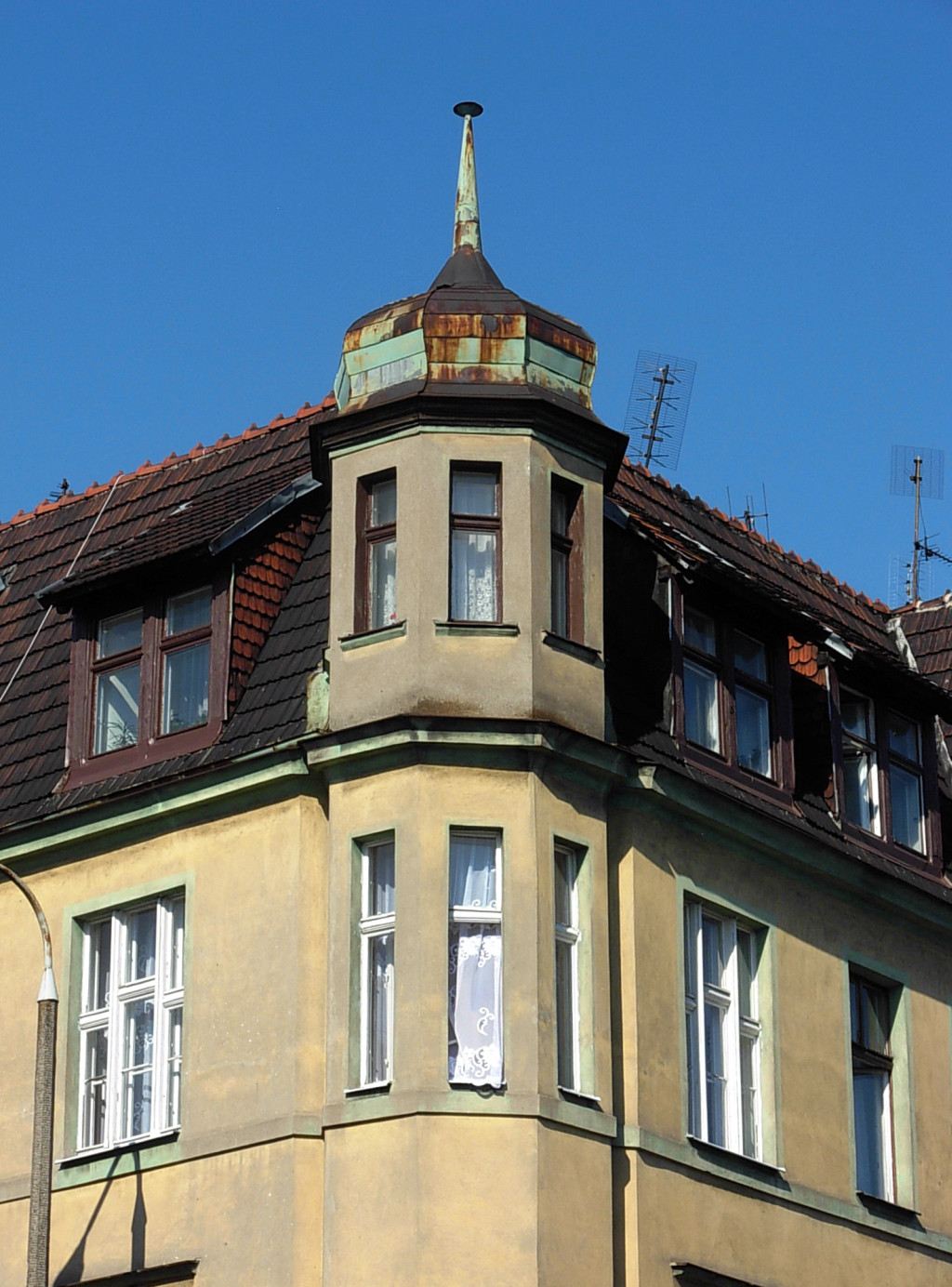
Detail of the onion dome at Nr.32

=== Wierus tenement at 33 ===
Early 1880s

Eclecticism

Wilhelm Wierus, a stonemason, commissioned the building in 1880 and kept it till the mid-1930s.

The tenement, renovated in 2021, displays superb architectural details.

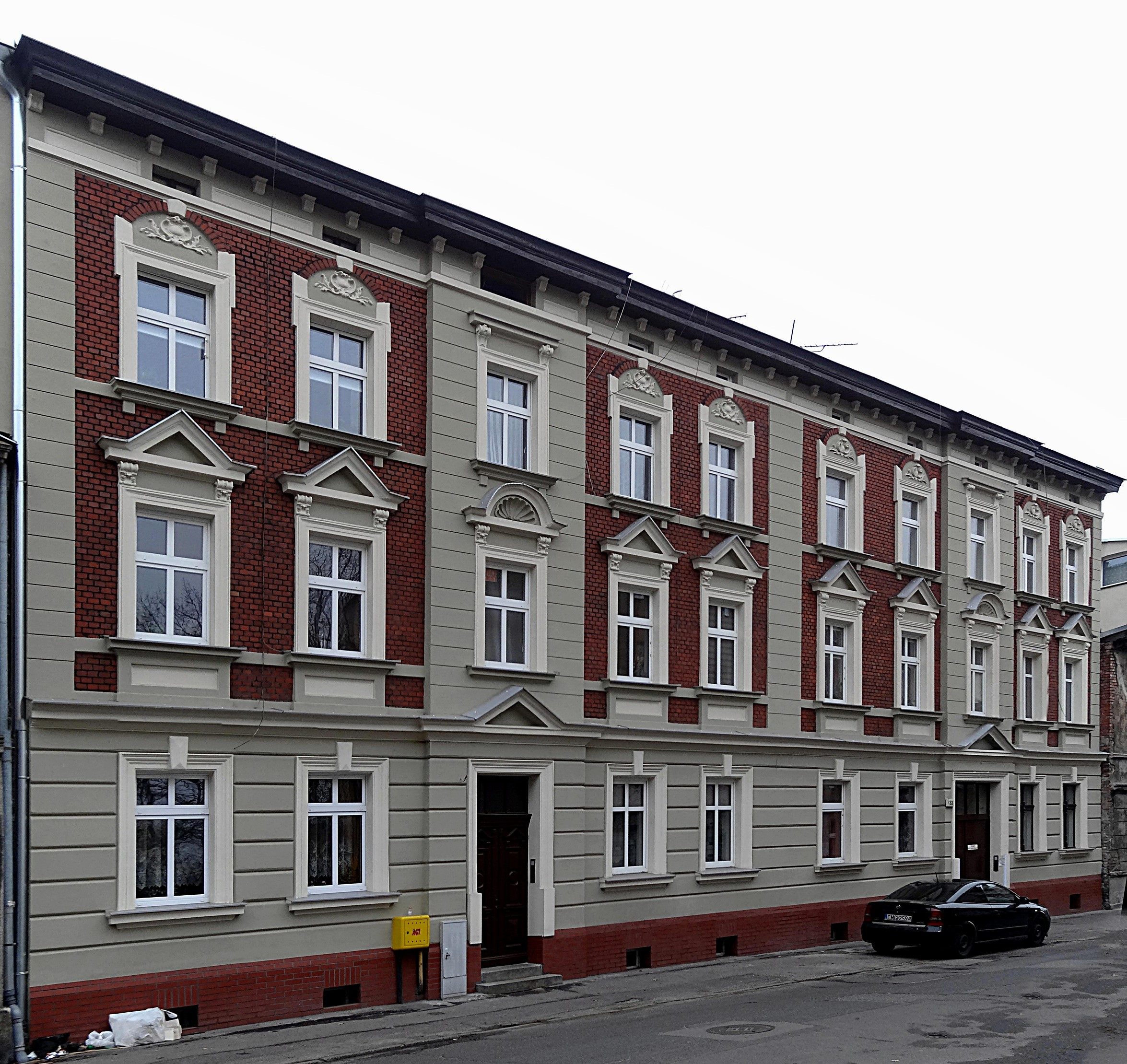
Refurbished frontage

=== Tenement at 34, corner with Rycerska street ===
1893

Eclecticism

This building, at then "21 Brenkenhoff Straße", had Eduard Mäßing, a beer and food merchant, as owner.

Both facades have unfortunately lost all their features with time.

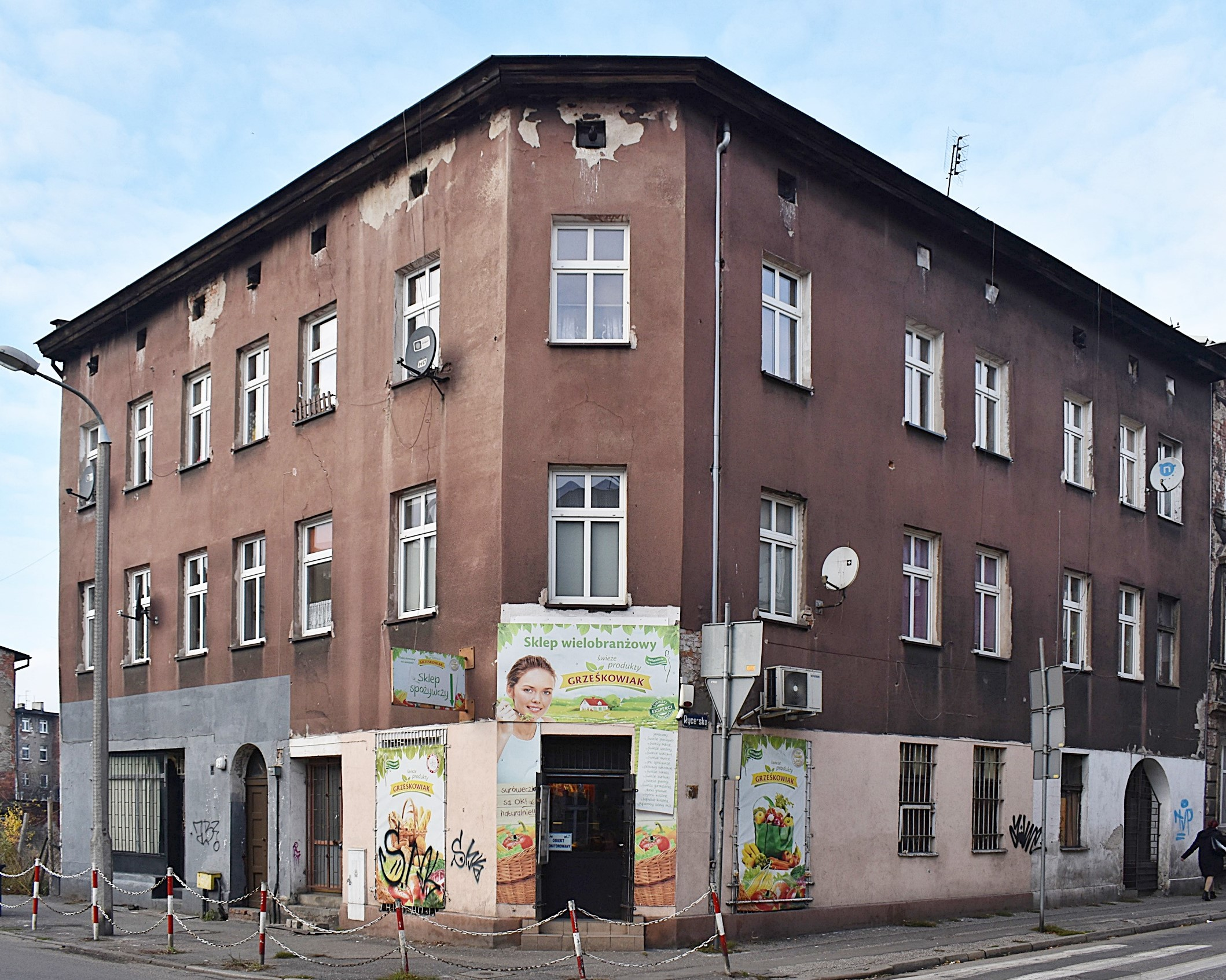
View from street corner

=== Radtke tenement, at 35 ===
1890-1891 and 1904, by Anton Hoffmann

Eclecticism, Art Nouveau

Ferdinand Radtke commissioned this building in the early 1890s to architect Anton Hoffmann. Radtke worked as a teacher at Adlershorst, a close suburban town south west of then Bromberg and lived in "Schulstraße" (today Dąbrowskiego street in Szwederowo district. The ensemble was modernized at the turn of the 20th century with Art Nouveau features.

The edifice has been deeply restored in 2021. One can now appreciate the balanced facade from the eclectic period (end of 19th century) mixed with plastered Art Nouveau motifs adorning the elevation gable.

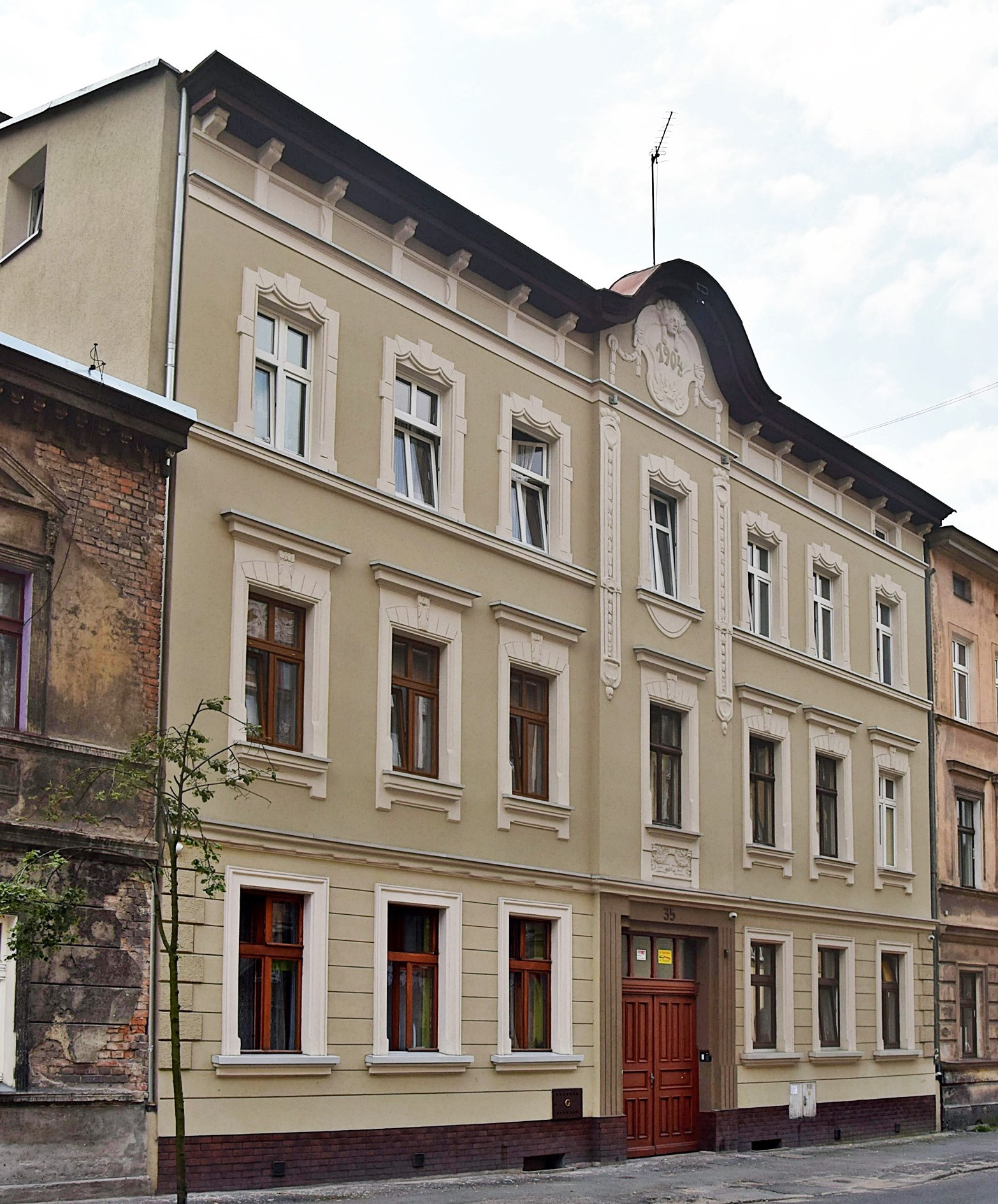
Renovated facade

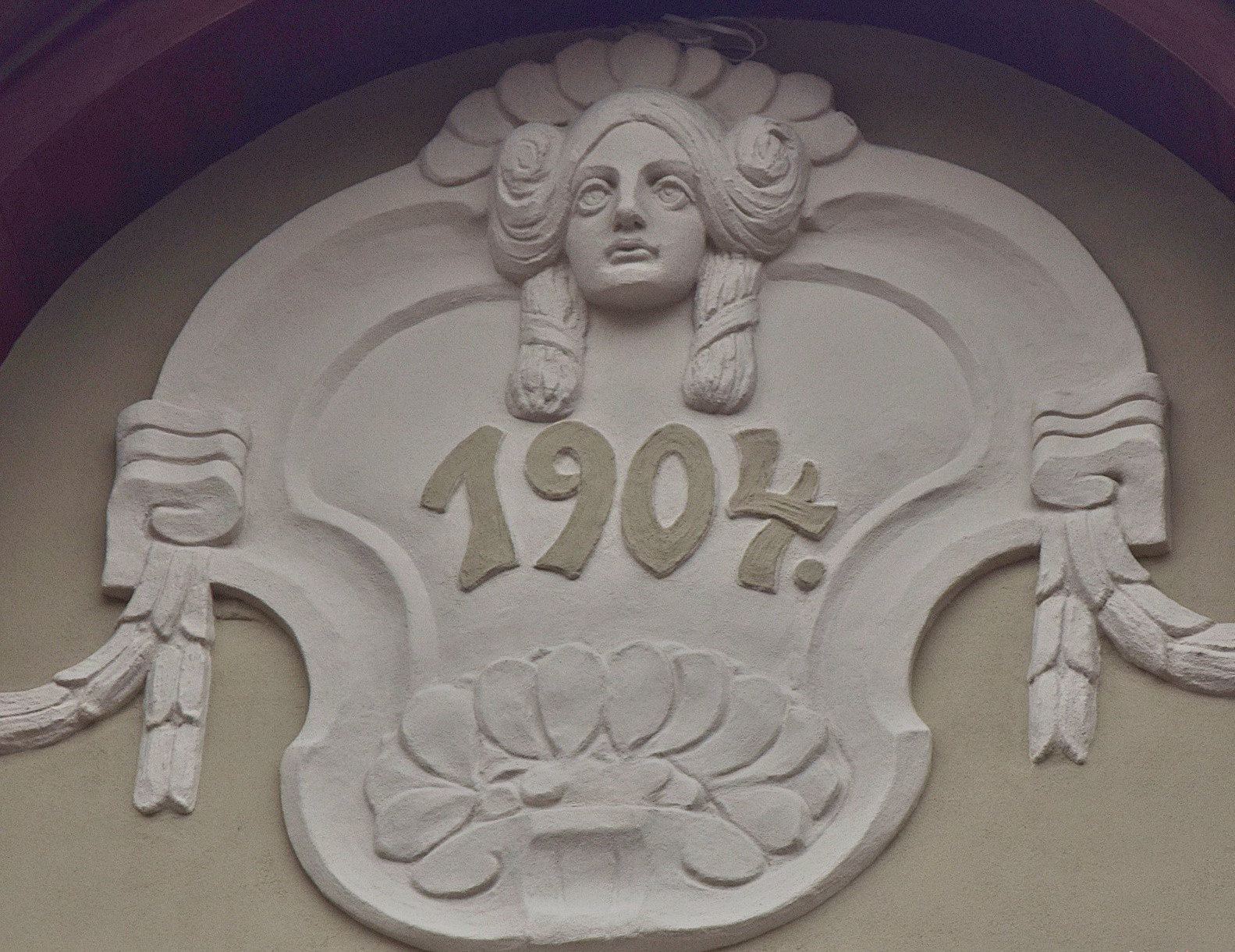
Stucco detail

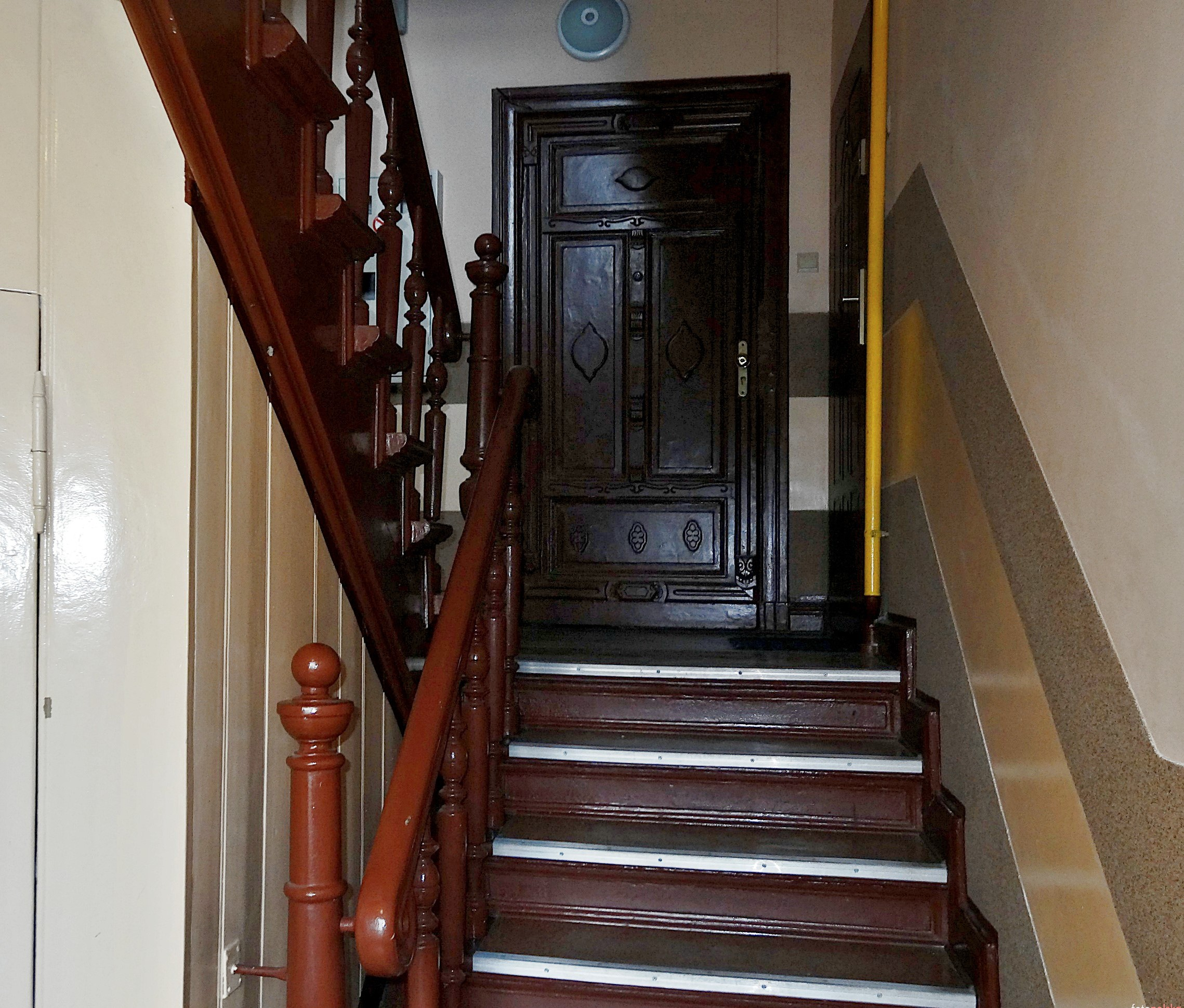
Staircase

=== Tenements at 37, 38 and 40 ===
1902 (37) 1896 (38) 1897 (40)

Eclecticism

Johann Domeracki, a journeyman, was the owner of the tenement at 37. Friedrich Greinert, a railway worker, owned Nr.38. Friedrich Engwer, an accountant, was the landlord of Nr.40.

- No specific architectural details survived on the facade of 37.
- Nr.38 has seen only its ground floor renovated: it underlines the half-moon transom entrance door topped with a bearded figure.
- N.40 has been restored in the 2010s and present nice eclectic features.
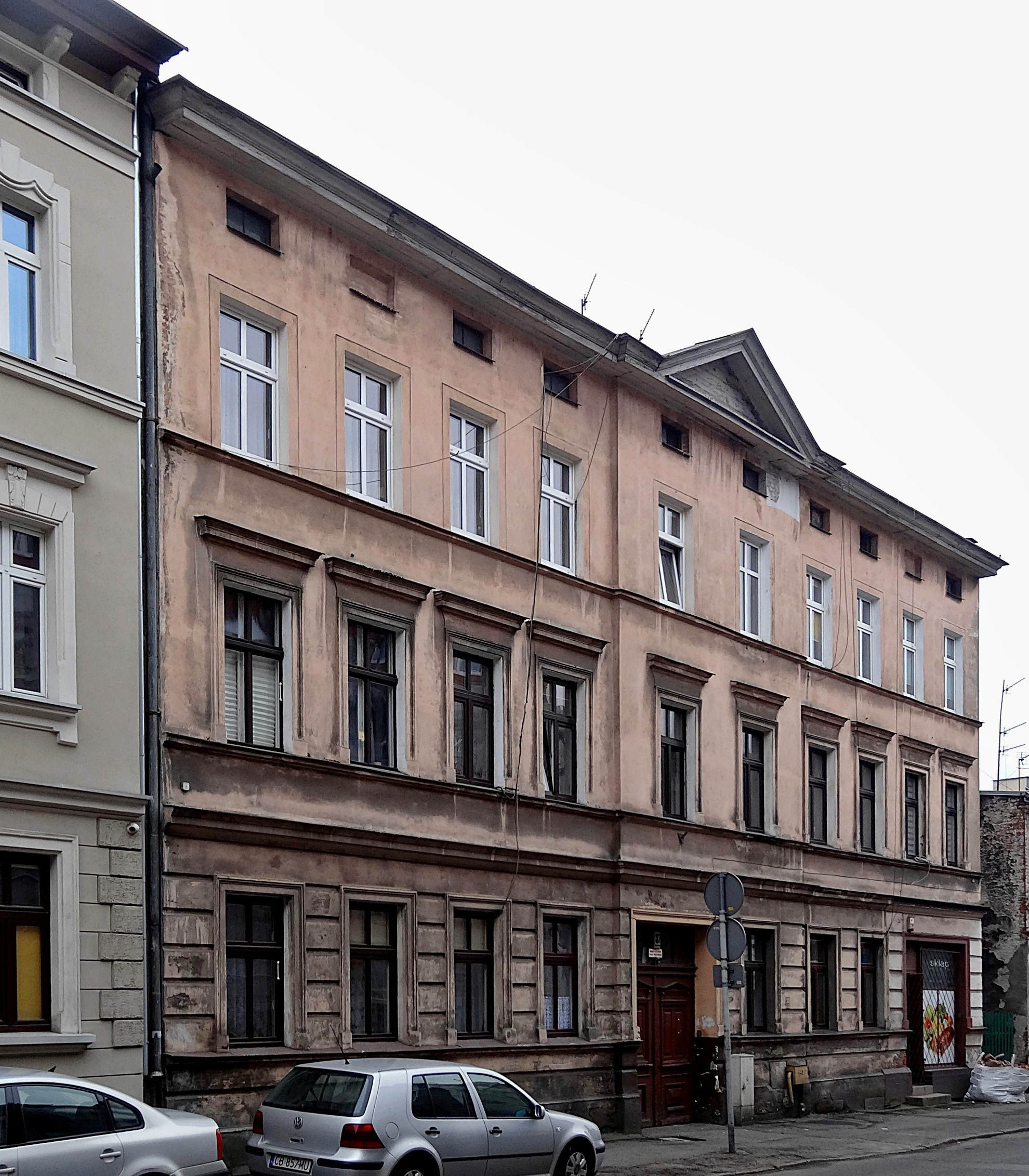
Main elevation at 37

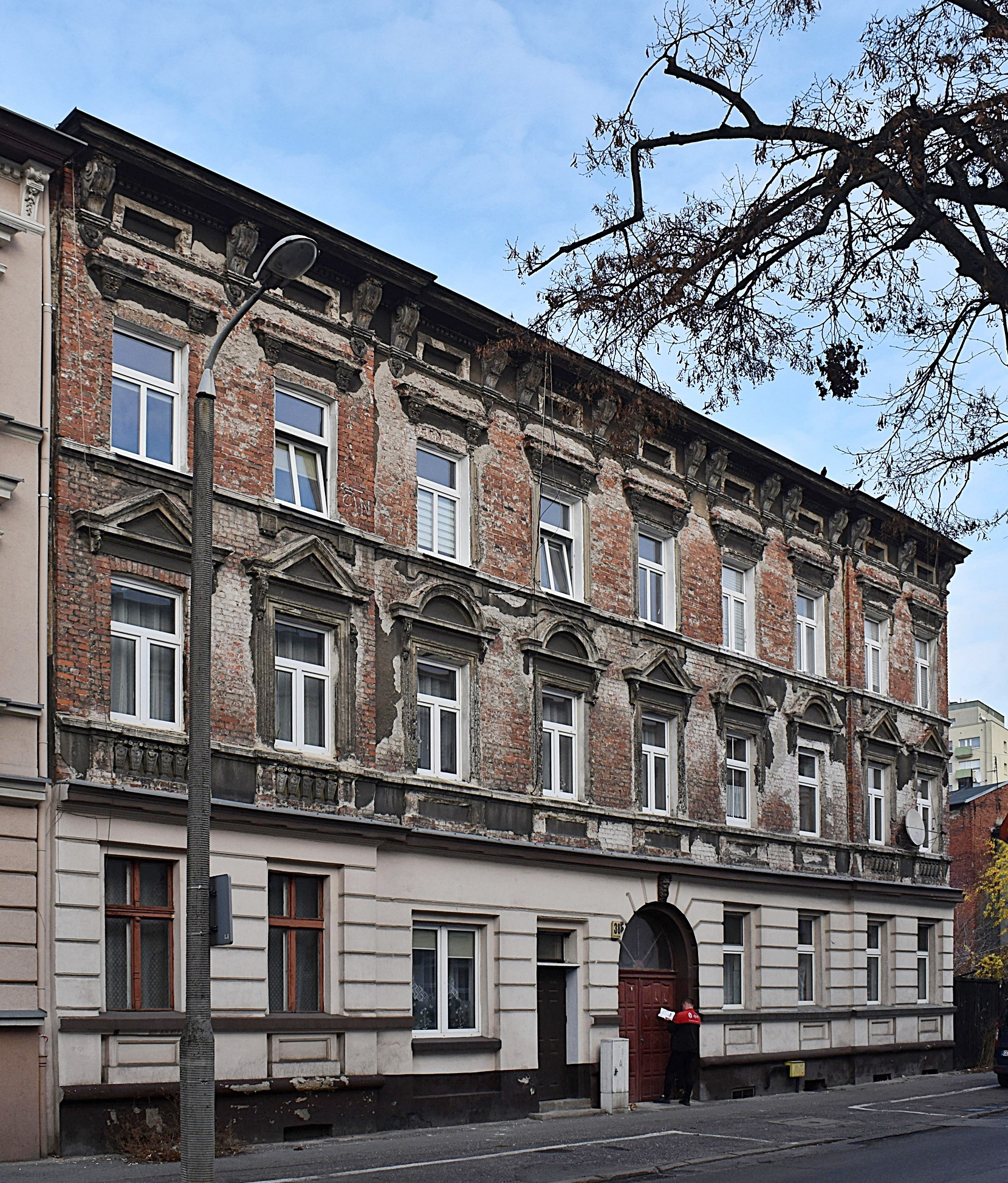
Frontage at 38

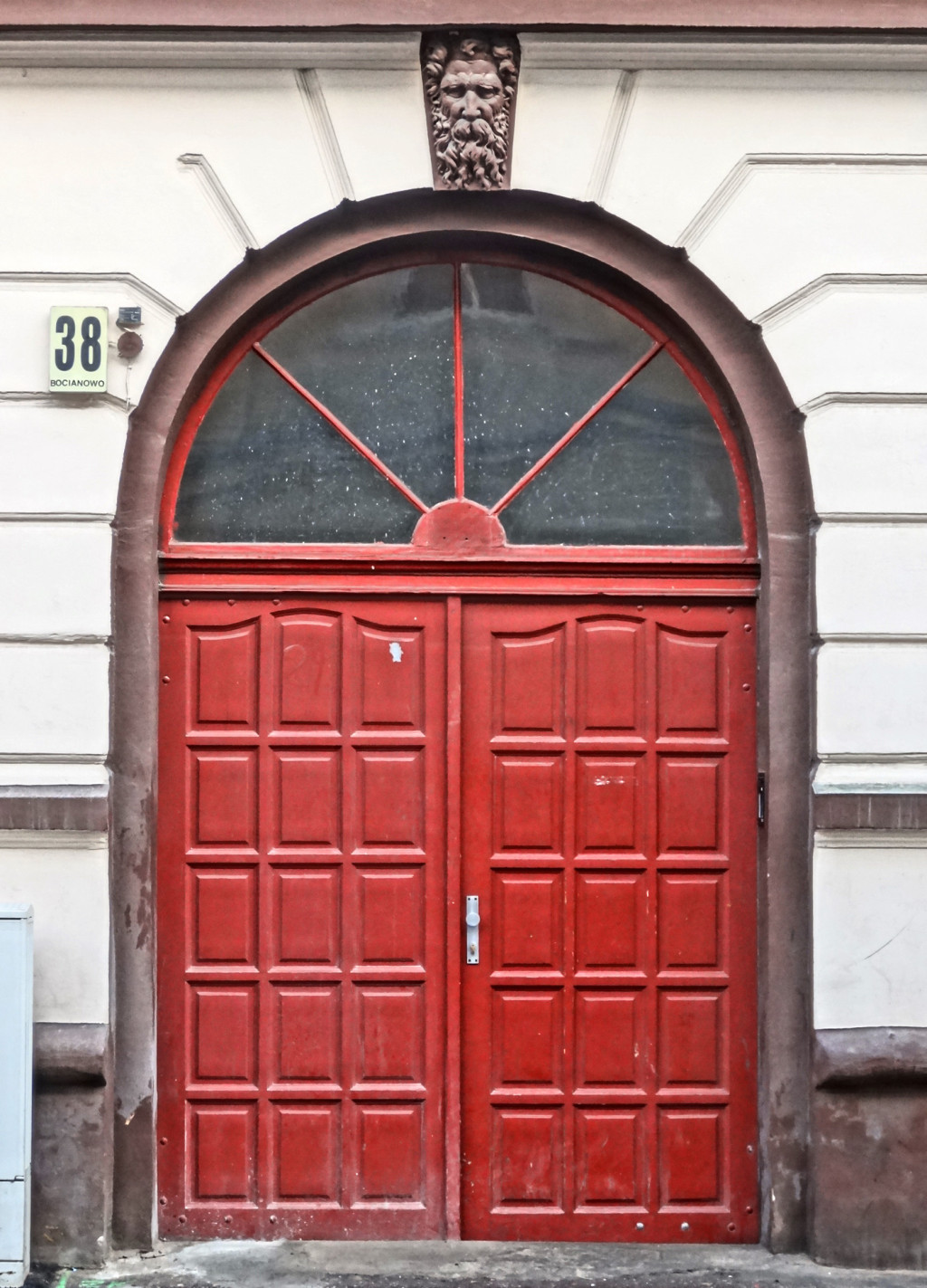
Nr.38 door

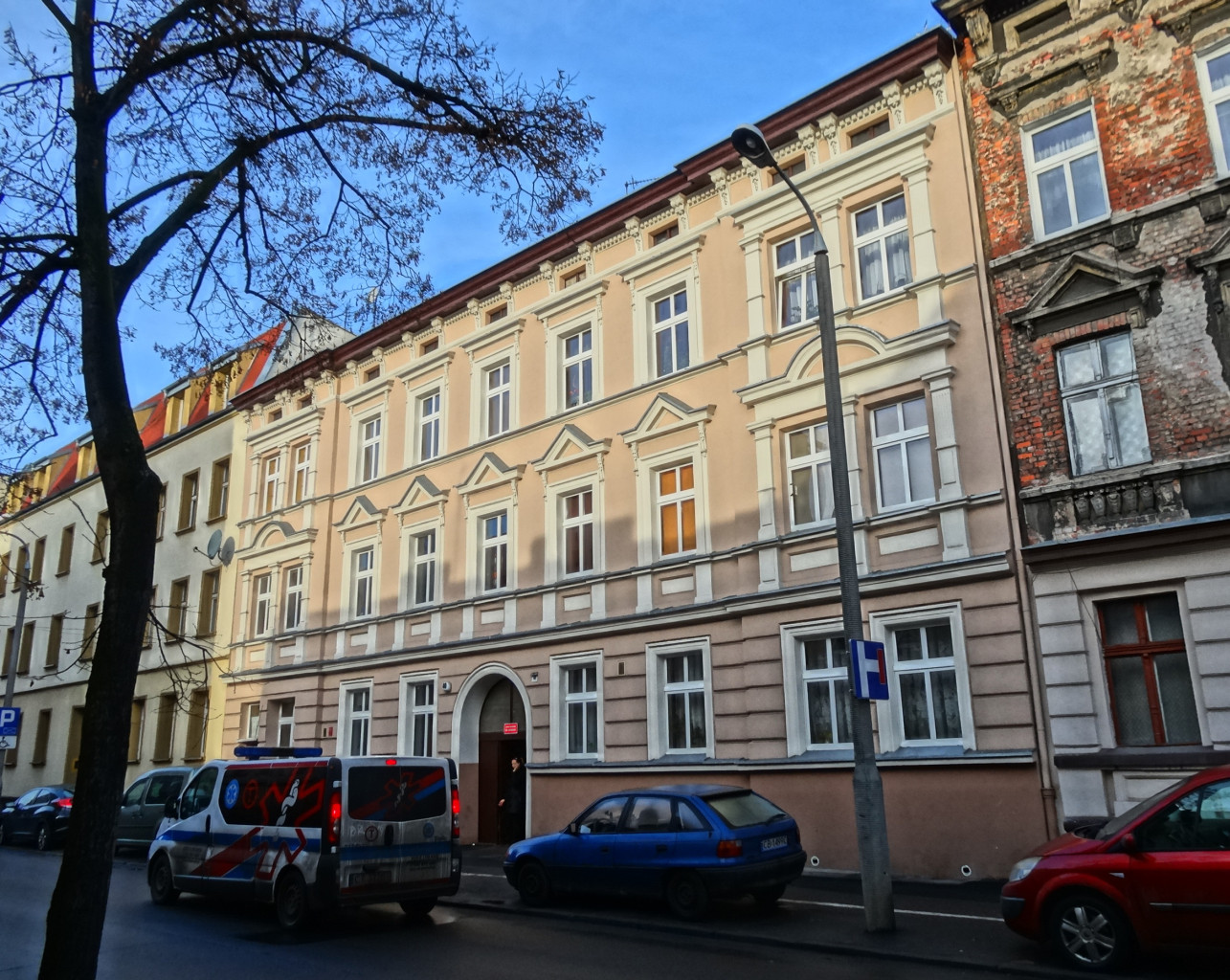
Facade at 40

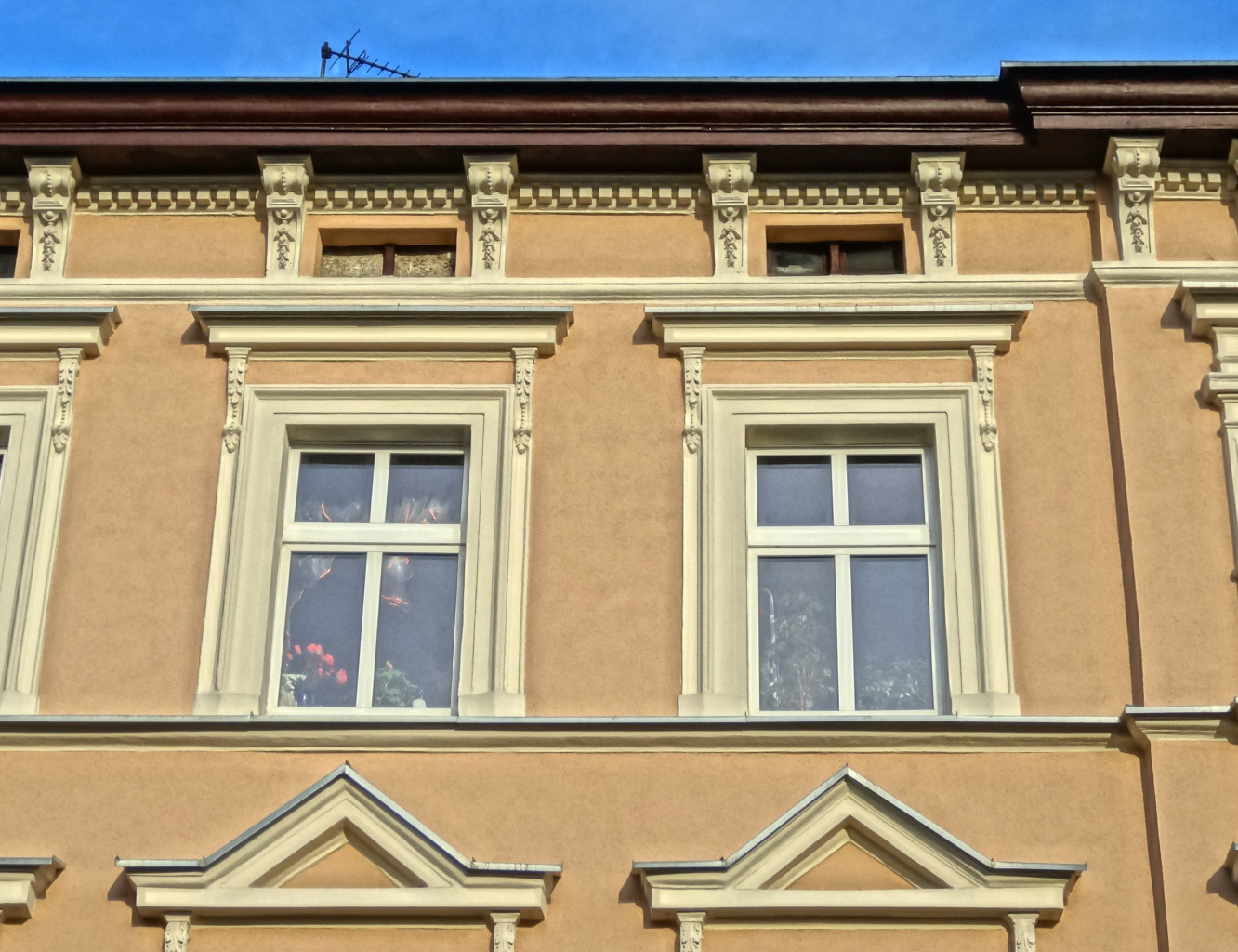
Architectural details at 40

=== Tenements at 41, 43 and 45 ===
1905 (41, 43) 1904 (45)

Eclecticism

These three tenements at then "13a/13b/13c Brenkenhoff Straße" had been commissioned by the city authorities. In the 1910s, around thirty tenants were living in these city apartments (German: Wohnungsverein).

The U-shape of the building recalls classical architecture patterns, creating an inside courtyard off the street. The renovation performed in the 2010s especially emphasizes the decoration of the portal at Nr.43, with lesenes and vegetal stuccowork.

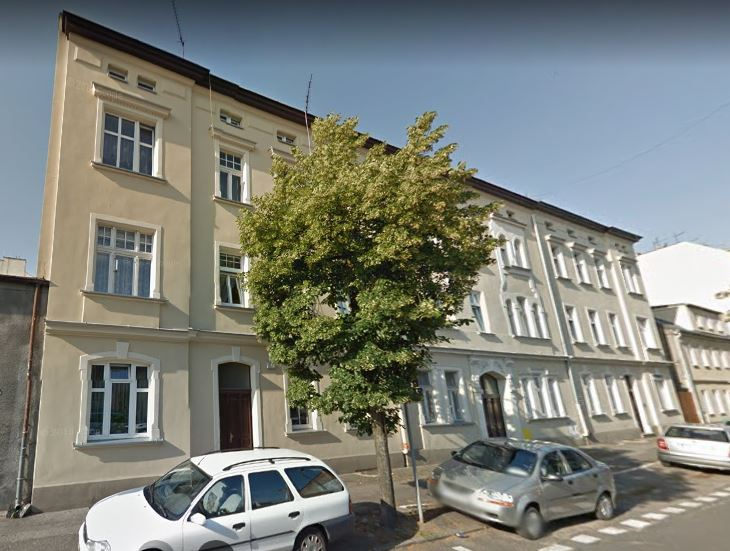
View of the three elevations

=== Tenement at 44, corner with 28 Sowińskiego Street ===
1875–1900

Eclecticism

Initial address was "16 Brenkenhoff Straße". Its first registered owner at the beginning of the 20th century was Mr Krüger, who was not living there.

The elevations present a neoclassical style (bossage, pediment and corbel table), the frontage on Sowińskiego street being much longer than the one on Bocianowo street.

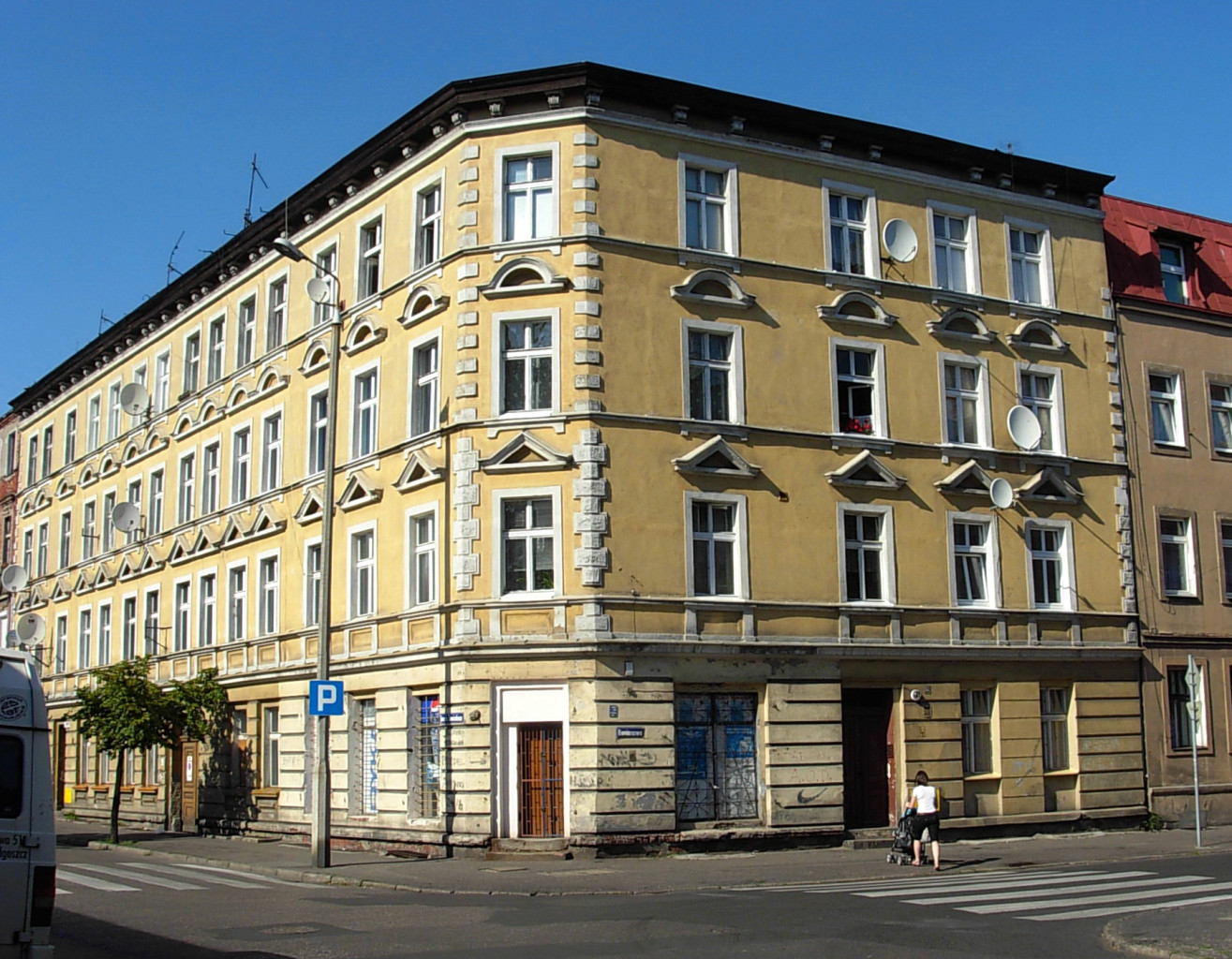
View of the tenement from the street crossing

=== Tenements at 49 and 51 ===
1908-1909 (49) 1902 (45)

Eclecticism, Art Nouveau

The tenement at Nr.49 (then "15 Brenkenhoff Straße") had Jacob Schott as landlord. Owner of the nearby building at 40, he was running a colonial goods shop (German: Kolonialwaren). Nr.51 (then "15a Brenkenhoff Straße"), at the intersection with Sowińskiego street, was first owned by Albin Cohnfeld, a rentier, living at "32 Banhoff straße" (today 77 Dworcowa Street). The following landlord was Konrad Zielsdorf, who had there a restaurant which he operated till the mid-1930s. From 1920 to the start of WWII, two hairdress businesses stood at street level, run by Jan Fritzkowski (Nr.49) and Stanisław Nowakowski (Nr.51).

The facade of Nr.49 keeps only one Art Nouveau element: the floral-motif stucco on the door lintel, bearing the year of erection of the house. The tenement at Nr.51 has only preserved two wrought iron balconies on the corner frontage.

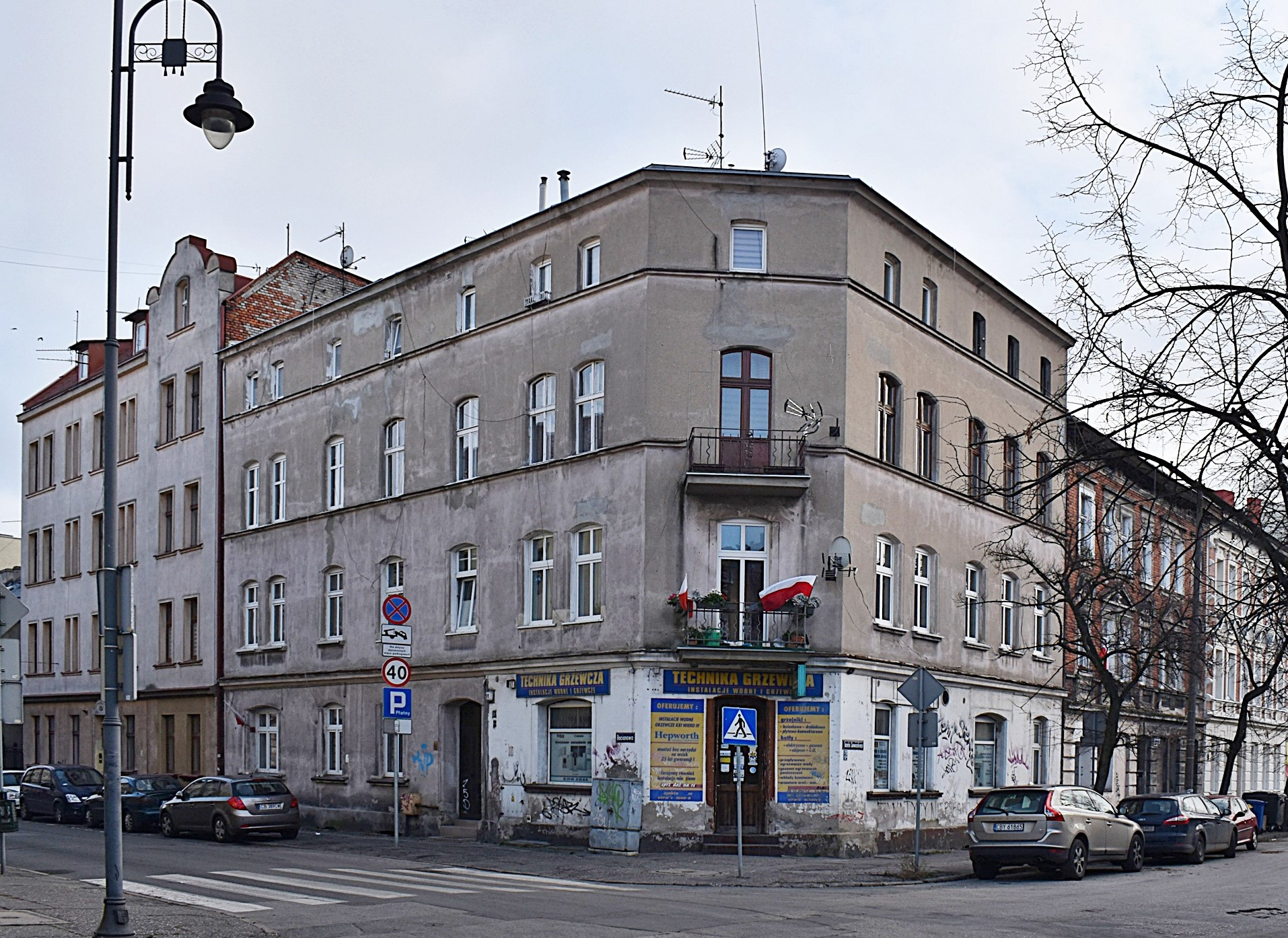
View of both tenements (Nr.49 on the left)

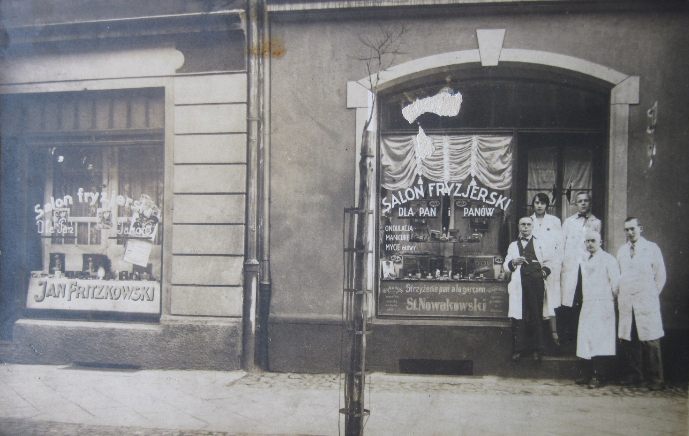
Picture of the hairdressing shops ca 1920s

== See also ==
- Bydgoszcz
- (in Polish) FAMOR company at Kaszubska street

== Bibliography ==
- Umiński, Janusz (1996). Bydgoszcz. Przewodnik (in Polish). Bydgoszcz: Regionalny Oddział PTTK "Szlak Brdy".
