= Anton Hoffmann =

- Born: 1820s Kolmar, Prussia
- Died: 14 February 1908; Bielsko Nowe, German Empire
- Occupation: Architect
- Spouse: Michalina Święcicka née Woytalewicz
- Parent(s): Johanna née Braun and Anton Hoffmann

Anton Hoffmann was an important designer and builder in Prussian-time Bydgoszcz during the entire second half of the 19th century. He witnessed the transformation of Bydgoszcz, creating numerous residential buildings throughout the city. His activity became, in a sense, an indicator of Bydgoszcz building traditions, bridging old neo classicist masters and their successors, inspired by Historicism and Art Nouveau.

== Life ==
=== Anton's family ===
Anton Hoffmann came from Greater Poland. He was born at the beginning of the 1820s in Chodzież (then Kolmar in Posen). He was the first-born son of Anton Hoffmann, a translator, and Johanna née Braun. His year of birth raises doubts, but one assumes Anton's most reliable date of birth is 24 May 1823. He spent the first several years of his life in his hometown of Chodzież, probably graduating from elementary school here. Then, between 1835 and 1837, the Hoffmanns moved to Łobżenica, but after a few years they moved to Bydgoszcz. In December 1846 they certainly lived in the city, in a rented house or, most likely, their own, marked Nr. 377, at today's Father Ignacy Skorupka street. The exact date of their arrival in the city is known by the registration book where is recorded the birth of Anton's five younger siblings (i.e. between 1840 and 1846).

=== Beginnings ===
Anton was registered as involved in masonry when settling in Bydgoszcz: it seems likely he began his apprenticeship in Łobżenica, knowing the basics of profession while arriving in Bromberg at age 23, where he worked as an independent (his first own designs date back to 1847). However, he was getting educated under the direction of mason masters (Hermann Donner, Emst Koch, Johann Wilhelm Krause, Friedrich Meyer, Gottlieb Meyer, Carl Schultz and Wilhelm Adolph Sieg). Anton received his Masonry Master's diploma between 1855 and 1857. On 8 May 1866 Anton Hoffmann married Michalina Święcicka (née Woytalewicz), widow of a Bydgoszcz shoemaker, in the parish church of Saints Marcin and Mikołaj in Bydgoszcz. Michalina from the first marriage had eight children, the younger still living with her. Among them was seven-year-old Józef Stanisław (1859–1913), whom Hoffmann educated as a builder. He was to become one of the most famous Bydgoszcz architect, i.e. Józef Święcicki. In 1881–1882, Anton and Józef set up a common design studio.

=== Architect career ===
Unlike most construction masters at the time, Anton never built his own home nor lived in a property he owned: he rented the apartments in which he lived and worked. With the help of address books, one can consequently work out the different houses he lived in with his family:

- 52 Feldstrasse (today's Jackowskiego Street) in 1855;
- 12 Bahnhofstrasse (29 Dworcowa Street) in 1858;

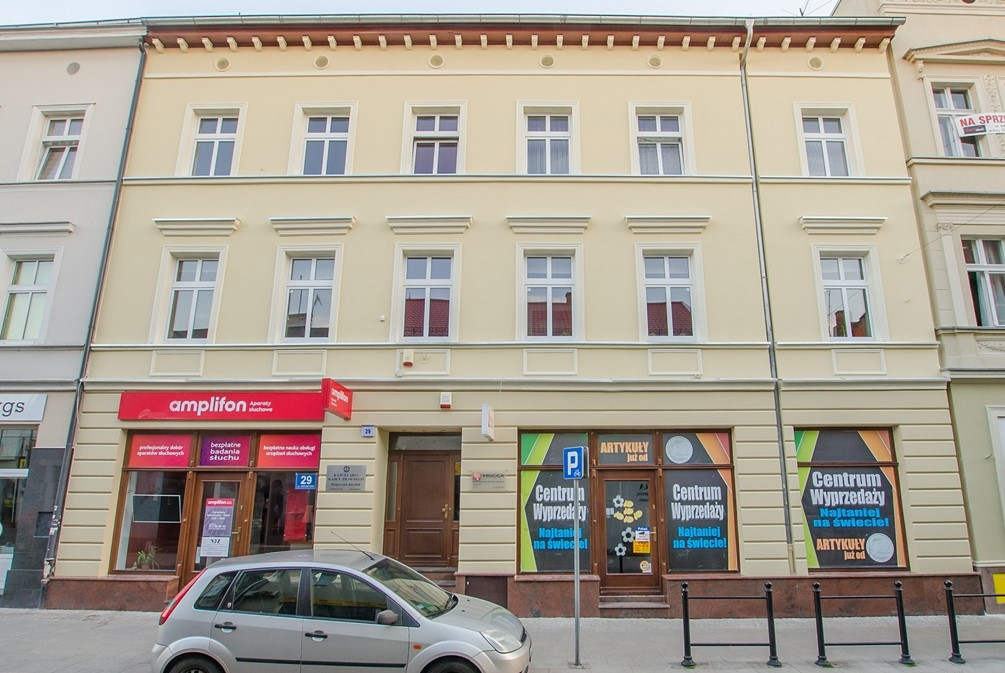
House at 29 Dworcowa

- 38 Friedrichstrasse (4 Długa street), in 1864;
- 12 Neue Pfarrstrasse (6 Jezuicka street), from 1866 to 1876;

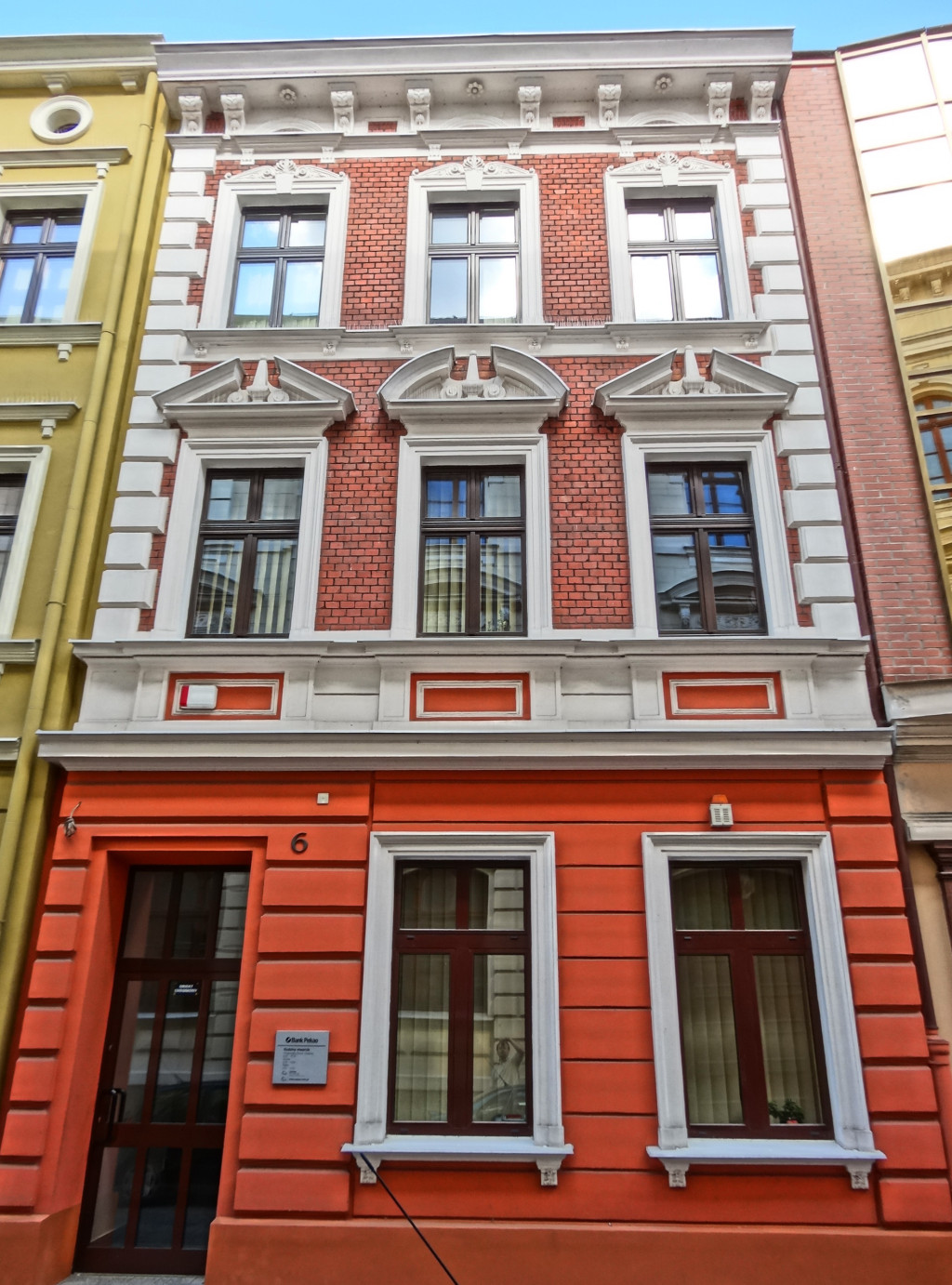
House at 6 Jezuicka street

- 11 Wilhelmstrasse (16 Focha street) from 1877 to 1880 and in 1892;

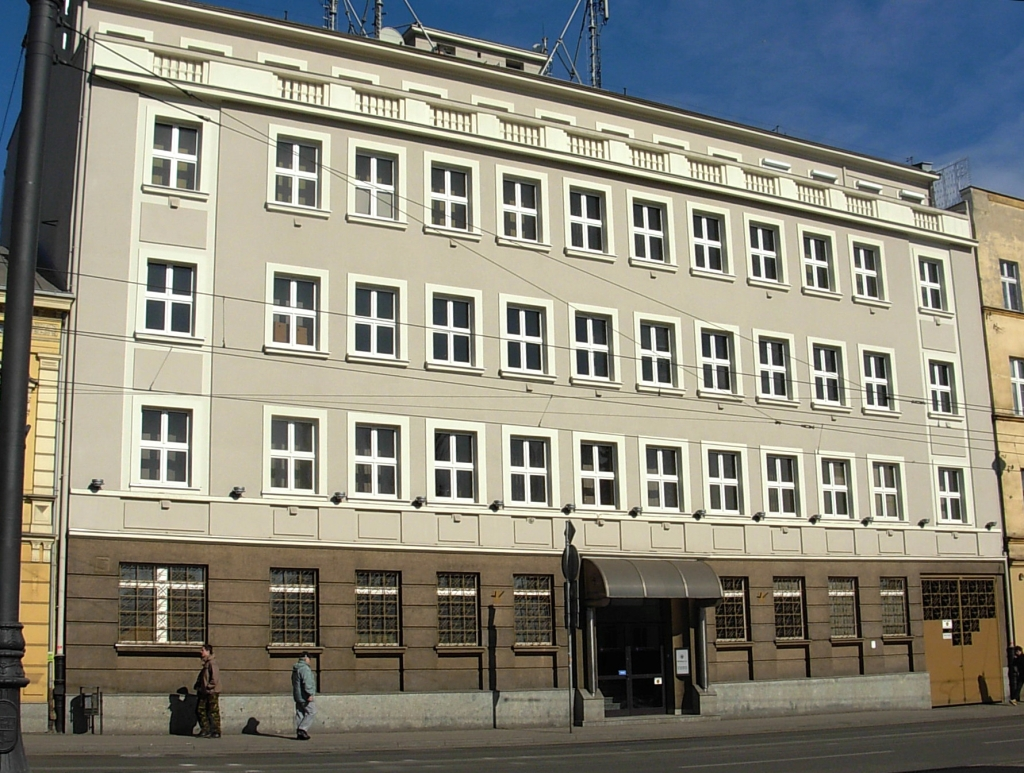
Building at 16 Focha street

- 3 Bahnhofstrasse (7 Dworcowa Street) between 1881 and 1884;

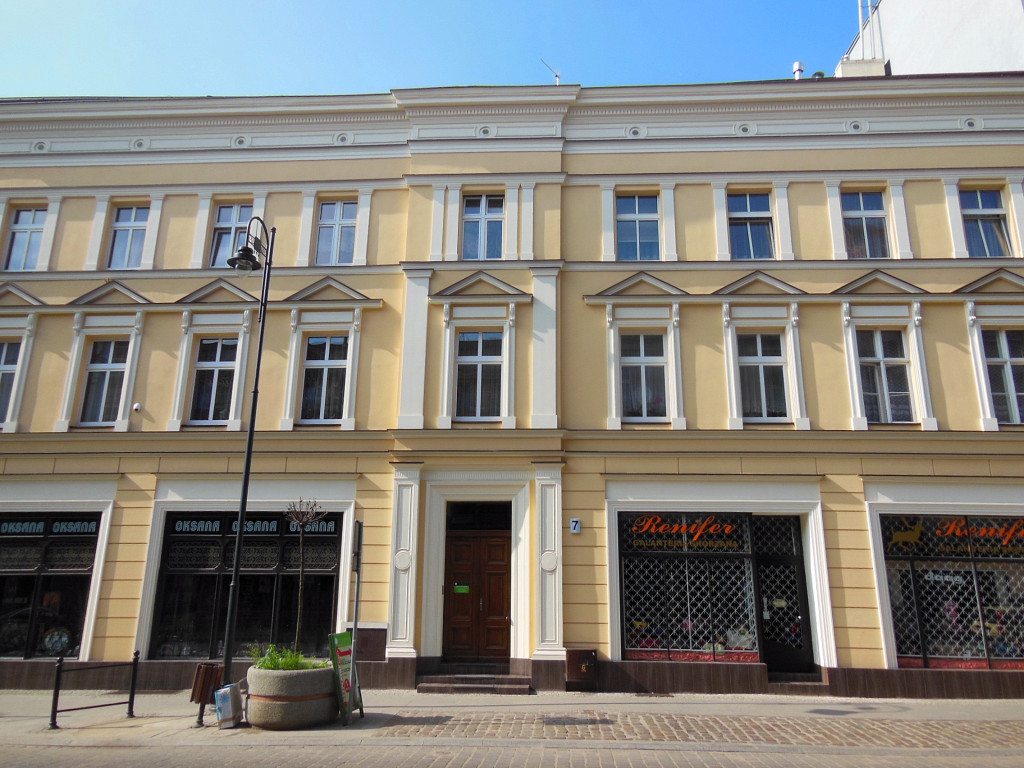
Tenement at 7 Dworcowa street

- 25 Gammstrasse (10 Doktora Emila Warmińskiego street), from 1885 to 1891;
- 4 and 28 Königstrasse (9 and 51 Kościuszki street) in the 1880s;
- 9 Brenkenhoff Straße (35 Bocianowo street) in the late 1880s;

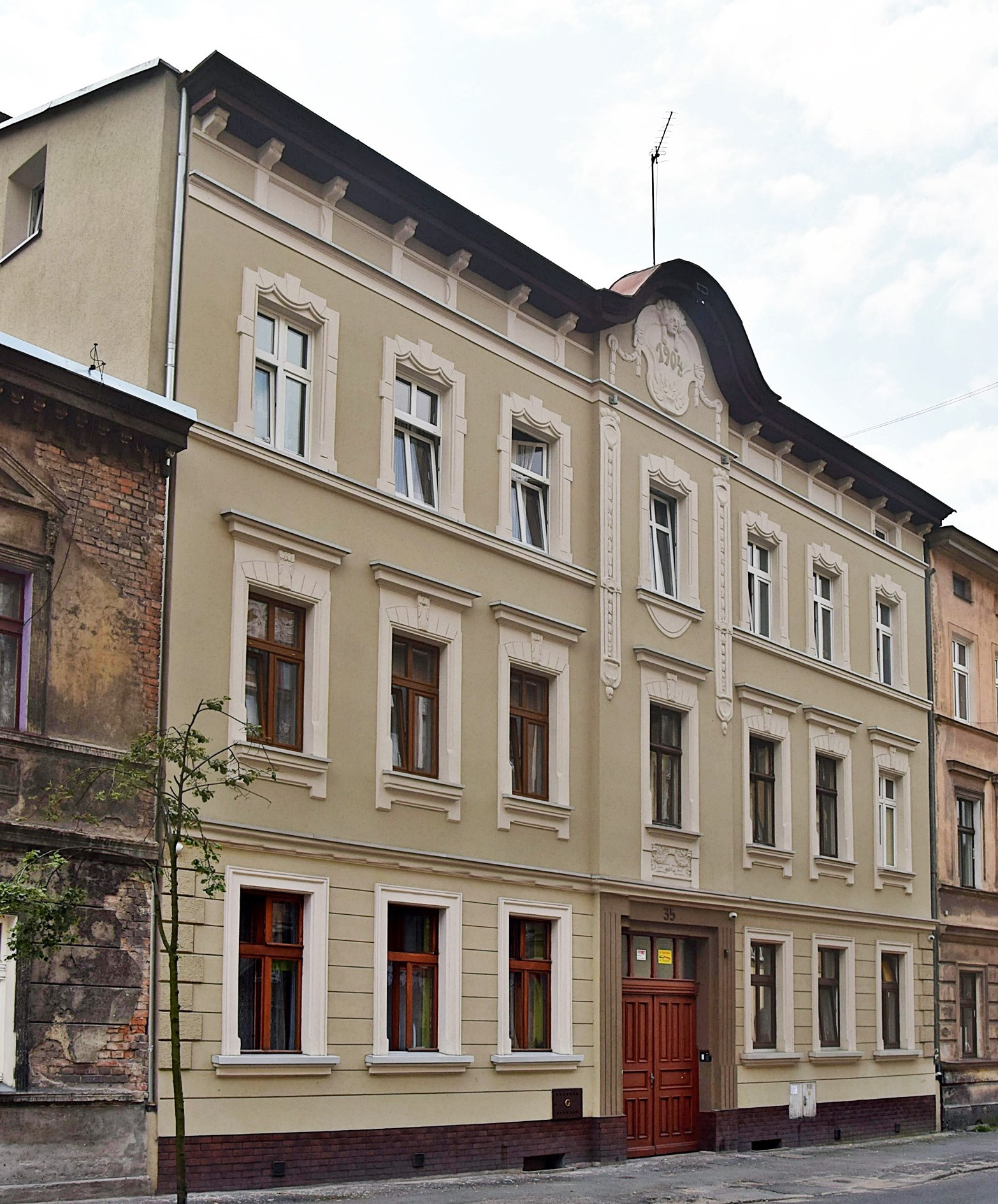
Tenement at 35 Bocianowo street

- 151/152 Danzigerstrasse (34/36 Gdańska street), from 1893 to 1895;

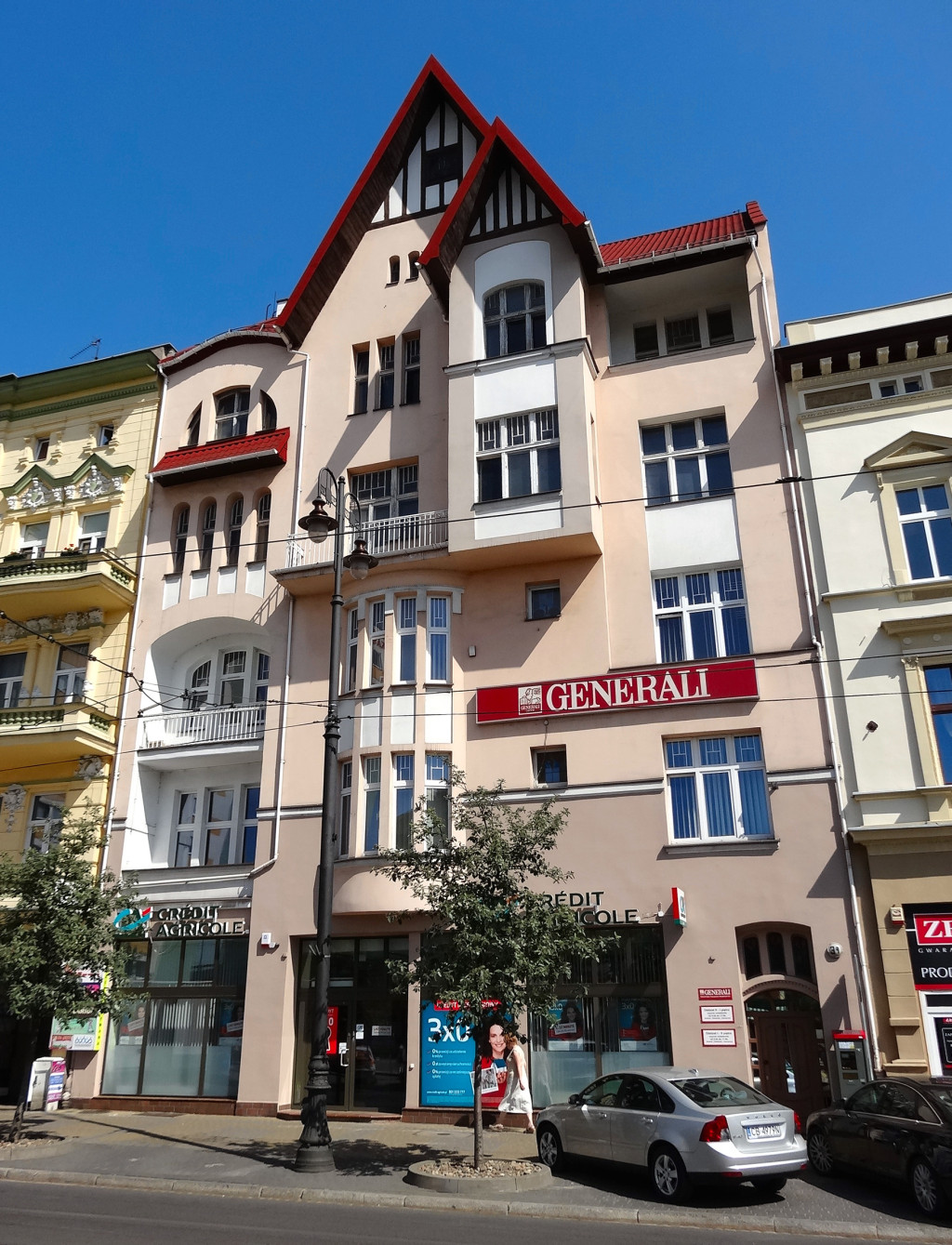
House located today at then 151/152 Danzigerstrasse

- 36 Danzigerstrasse (59 Gdańska street) in 1896;
- 41 Danzigerstrasse (69 Gdańska street) between 1897 and 1900;

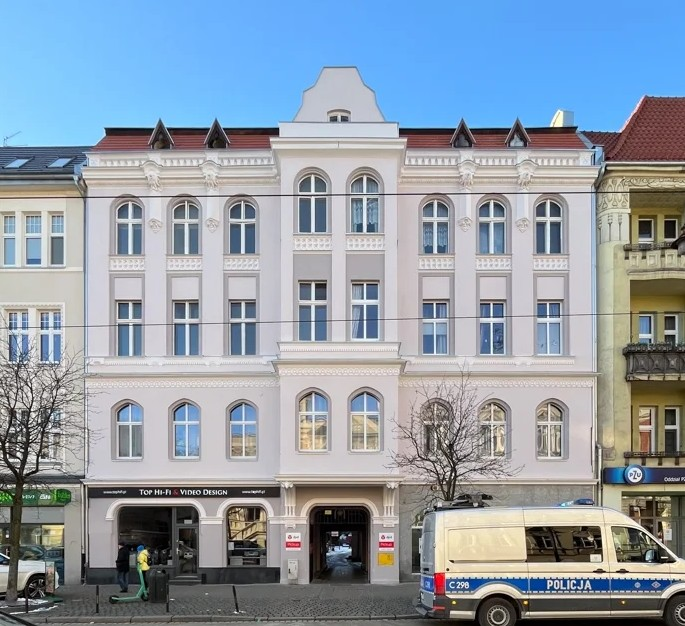
House at 69 Gdańska street

- 47 Rinkauerstrasse (46 Pomorska Street) in 1901–1902;
- 38 Danzigerstrasse (63 Gdańska street) in 1903;

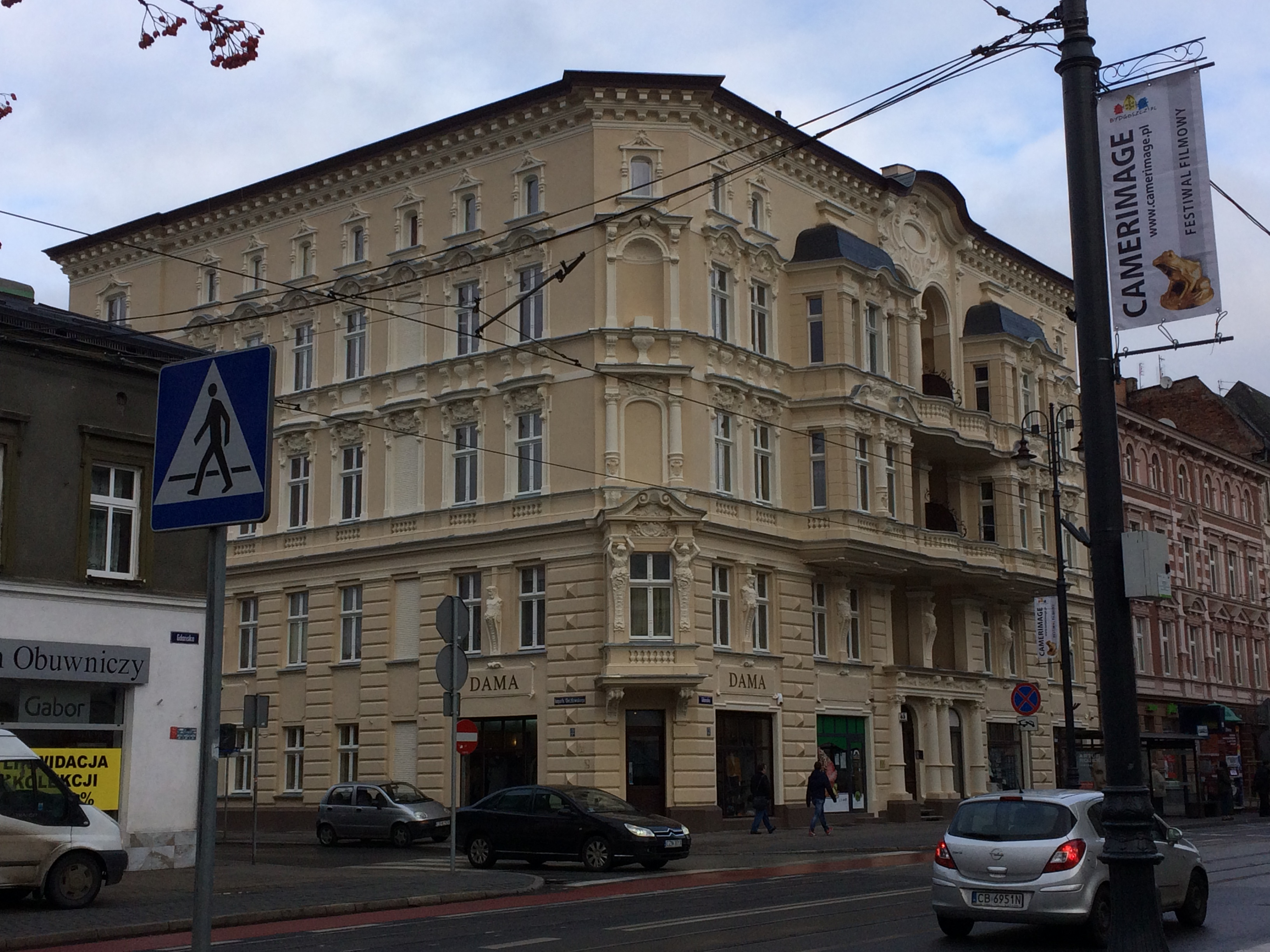
Tenement at 63 Gdańska street

- 6 Schulstrasse (86 Bielicka street) from 1904 to 1908.

Unlike his colleagues, he was not involved in lucrative and relatively popular real estate: many of his contemporaries purchased plots of land, invested in buildings, and then sold them for profit. Once retired, Anton moved to a rental flat located on the outskirts of the Bielsko Nowe commune. Here he spent the four last years of his life as a rentier. He died on Friday evening, 14 February 1908, and was buried four days later at the Nowofary Cemetery in Bydgoszcz.

== Style and influence ==
Anton's architectural achievements, shaped under the influence of the older generation of architects active in Bydgoszcz from 1825 to the late 1860s, is inscribed in the city landscape. Hoffmann, remarkably, designed and participated in the implementation of construction for half a century, working with most, if not all, of building companies in the city. No one else worked in the construction industry as long as he did. A. Hoffmann was the author of a considerable number of projects made for property owners located in Bromberg and its suburbs. He designed tenement houses, modest front houses, residential outbuildings, craft workshops and various outbuildings: warehouses, stables, laundries, coach houses, sheds and toilets.

By and large, front houses designed by Hoffmann are realized in classicist and neo-renaissance styles: he was a traditionalist, not looking for new solutions, but repeated proven composition patterns. His projects were buildings of simple shapes, bearing no specific features identifying them with their author. He generally based the composition of his edifices on the axis of symmetry, as done according to Neo-Renaissance canons. In addition, the decoration of his buildings was very modest, referring to the Neo-Classicism style.

Listing the overall achievements of Anton Hoffmann is difficult, since the authorship of many edifices, especially those built from 1875 to 1900, remains undetermined. Loyal as he was to stylistic conservatism, Anton could not compete with the skills of the following generation, inspired by historicism and early Art Nouveau: hence he was not remembered for any prestigious building. Be that as it may, Anton Hoffmann made a permanent place in the history of Bydgoszcz architecture and his architectural activity, and his work was appreciated for its reliability.

== Works in Bydgoszcz ==
Main preserved buildings by Anton Hoffmann in Bydgoszcz
Year	Edifice	Remarks	Picture
1877	9 Konarskiego street	The building houses today a luxurious hotel, Hotel Bohema.	
Late 1870s	3 Długa street	The main elevation has been renovated in 2014/2015.	
1875–1900	56 Długa street	Hoffmann rebuilt the second floor, with a new loft.	
1875–1900	31 Śniadecki Street	First owner was Carl Buhrand, a merchant.	
1878	44 Sienkiewicza Street	At the corner with Hetmańska street	
1879	17 Sienkiewicza Street	Successive landlords were the Schmidts, Wilhelm then Gustav, both restaurateurs.	
1882	46 Śniadecki Street	The edifice was co-built together with Anton's Stepson, Józef Święcicki.	
1882–1883	42 Śniadecki Street	The building, then at Elisabethstraße 42a, was a commission from Max Schmidt, a teacher	
1883	15 Podwale Street	Józef Święcicki and Anton Hoffmann designed and built a second storey. In 1895–1896, a third floor was added thanks to a design by Karl Bergner, with a large front shop giving onto the street.	

Main preserved buildings by Anton Hoffmann in Bydgoszcz
Year	Edifice	Remarks	Picture
1885	100 Dworcowa Street	From 1877 to 1886, the building housed a hotel, Hotel St. Petersburg, run by Louis Jacobowski between 1877 and 1886.	
1885–1888	1 Chocimska Street, corner with Gdańska Street	Reinhold Zschiesche Tenement	
1886	3 Piotra Skargi Street	The villa was designed and built in 1886 for a well-known Bydgoszcz doctor, Hugo Bille.	
1886	137 Gdańska Street	First owner of this house at then Danzigerstraße 71 was Gustav Stiehlau, restaurateur and locksmith.	
1886	113 Gdańska Street	The first owner was Reinhold Zschiesche, also owner at 1 Chocimska Street.	
1887	115 Gdańska Street	Johann Bordanowicz, the first landlord, was a butcher whose shop remained in use till the outbreak of World War I.	
1887	86 Gdańska street	The house was built in 1887–1888 for a timber dealer, Hugo Hecht.	
1887	4 Dworcowa Street	Julius and Herß Krojanter were the first owners: they were cereals merchants and had their counter in the building.	
1888–1900	Villa Hugo Hecht in Bydgoszcz	Commissioner was Hugo Hecht, the timber dealer owner of Nr.86.	
1890–1891	Radke tenements at 35 Bocianowo Street	Radtke worked as a teacher at Adlershorst, a close suburban town south west of then Bromberg and lived in "Schulstraße" (today Dąbrowskiego street in Szwederowo district.	
Late 1890s	Tenements at Nos.53/55/57 Sienkiewicza Street	This realization was part of project commissioned by Kazimir Gączerzwicz, a shoe maker living at Nr.57.	

== See also ==
- Bydgoszcz
- Bydgoszcz Architects (1850-1970s)
- List of Polish people

== Bibliography ==
- Derkowska-Kostkowska, Bogna (2004). Anton Hoffmann – tradycja i profesjonalizm w bydgoskiej architekturze. Kronika Bydgoska 26 (in Polish). Bydgoszcz: Towarzystwo Miłosnikow Miasta Bydgoszczy – Bydgoskie Towarzystwo Naukowe. pp. 451–463.
