= Theonia Reichhardt House =

Theonia Reichhardt House in Bydgoszcz
- Polish: Kamienica Theonii Reichhardt w Bydgoszczy
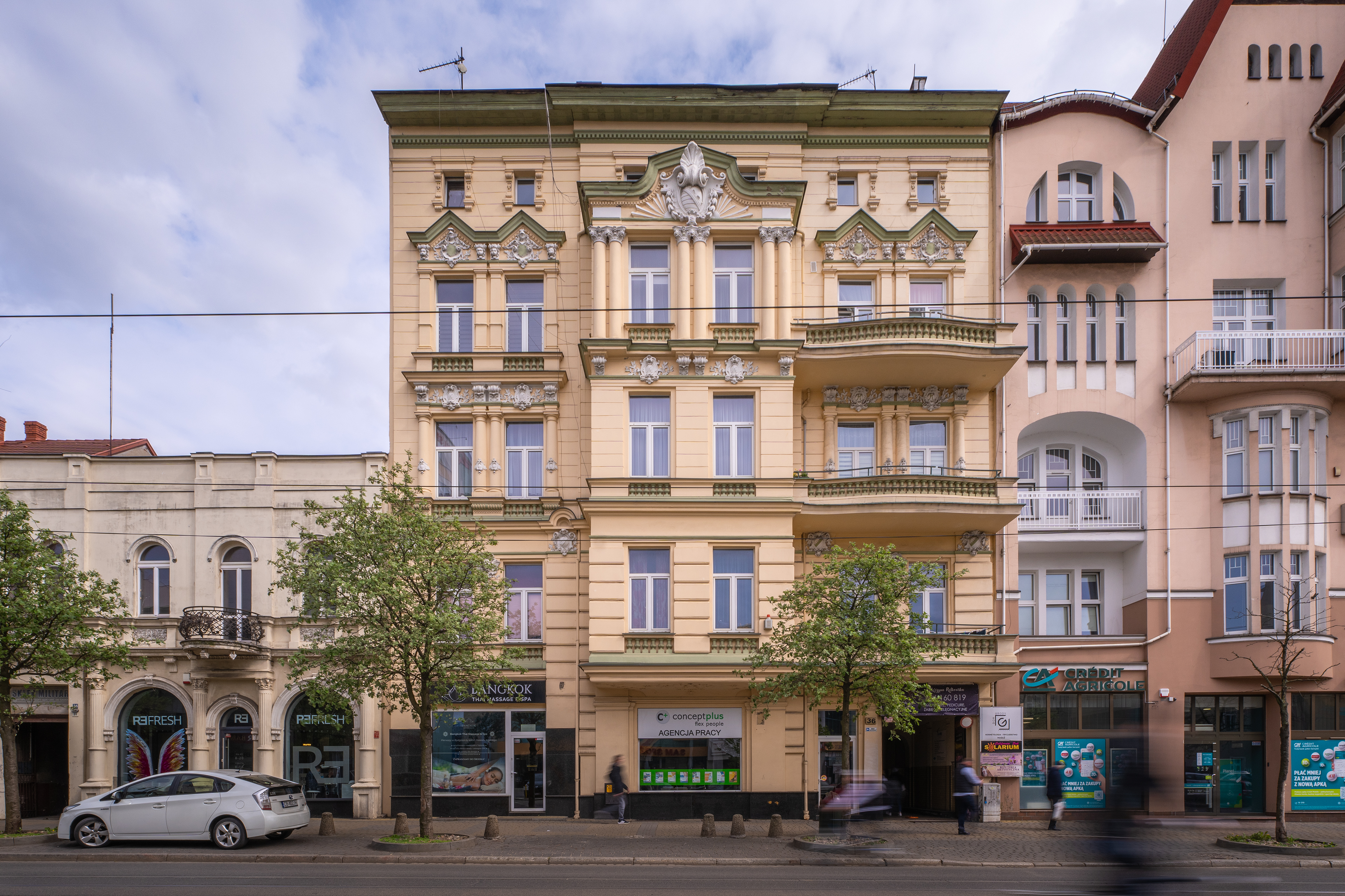
- View from Gdańska street
- Interactive map of the Theonia Reichhardt House in Bydgoszcz area

General information
- Type: Tenement
- Architectural style: Eclecticism & Neo-baroque
- Location: 36 Gdańska street, Bydgoszcz, Poland, Poland
- Coordinates: 53°7′43″N 18°0′24″E
- Completed: 1875
- Renovated: 1897-1898
- Client: Theonia Reichhardt

Technical details
- Floor count: 4

Design and construction
- Architect: Józef Święcicki

The Theonia Reichhardt house is a tenement in downtown Bydgoszcz, at 36 Gdańska Street.

== Location ==
The building stands on the eastern side of Gdańska Street, between Krasiński and Słowackiego streets. During the Prussian era, the address of the house was 151 Danziger straße, Bromberg.

== History ==
The house was built in the years 1897–1898 for Theonia Reichhardt, widow in 1885 of Mr Reichhardt, a music teacher. The Reichhardt family lived there since 1880 and the widow had the original 1875 residential building reconstructed as we can see now in the late 1890s.

The building housed a brewery, a restaurant and in the 20th century a café house, Lilas.

== Architecture ==
The tenement was designed by the architect Józef Święcicki, who also designed (among others):

- Hotel "Pod Orlem" at 14 Gdańska street;
- Oskar Ewald Tenement at 30 Gdańska street;
- Tenement at 1 Freedom Square.

For this edifice, Joseph Święcicki prepared plans for a building with large dimensions and a rich decoration, which was to span along the whole façade. However, due to limited financial resources, the initial project was modified and eventually only the left side of the building got its luxurious ornamentation. The view is still striking, even today.

The building has an asymmetrical façade and eclectic wooden decoration of neo-Baroque forms. The façade is enriched with decorative palmettes, heads of lions, and cartouches. Inside one of them, above a balcony of the second floor, a letter R (for Reichhardt) is still apparent.

== Gallery ==
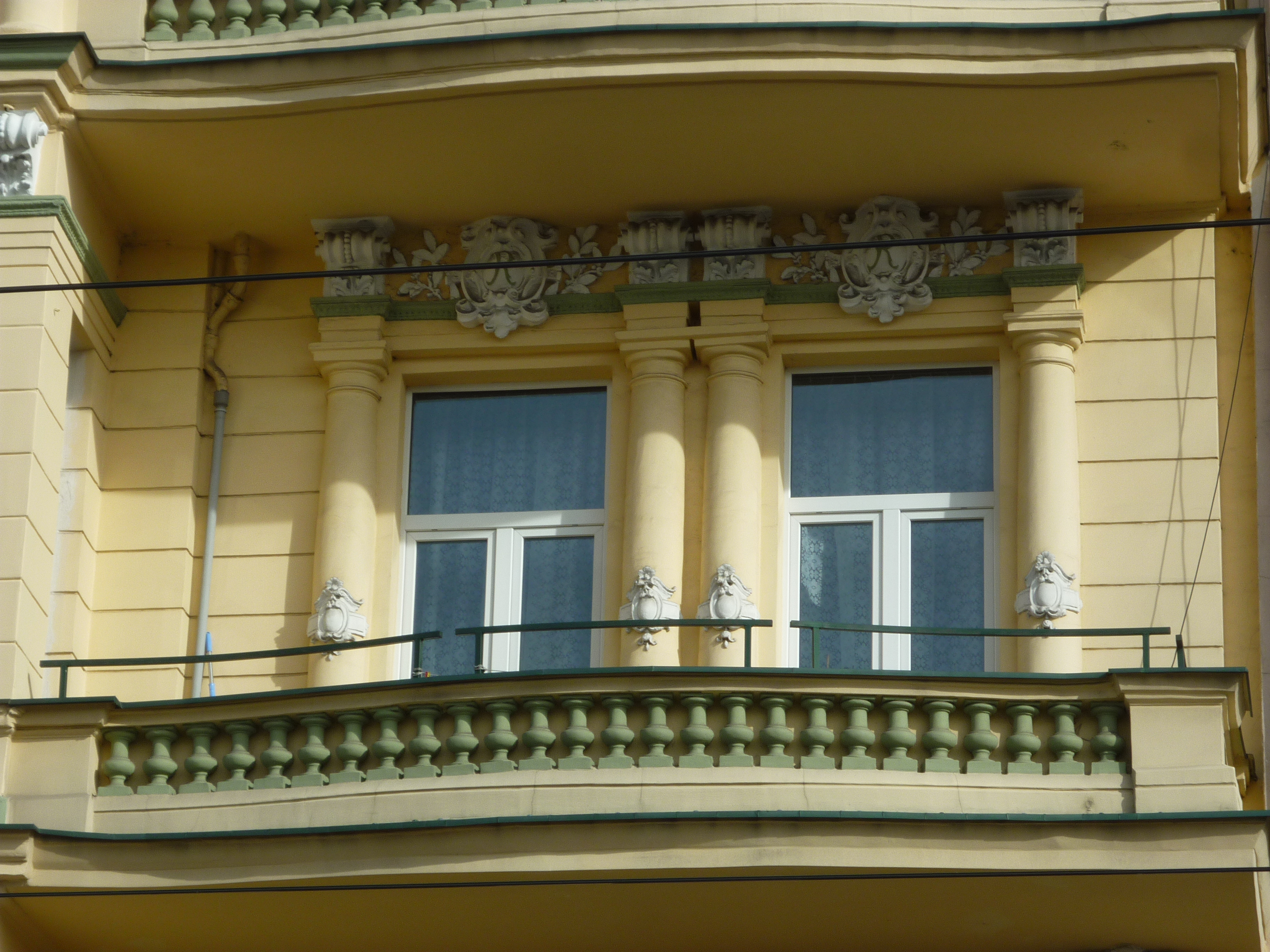
Detail of the balcony with carved initials

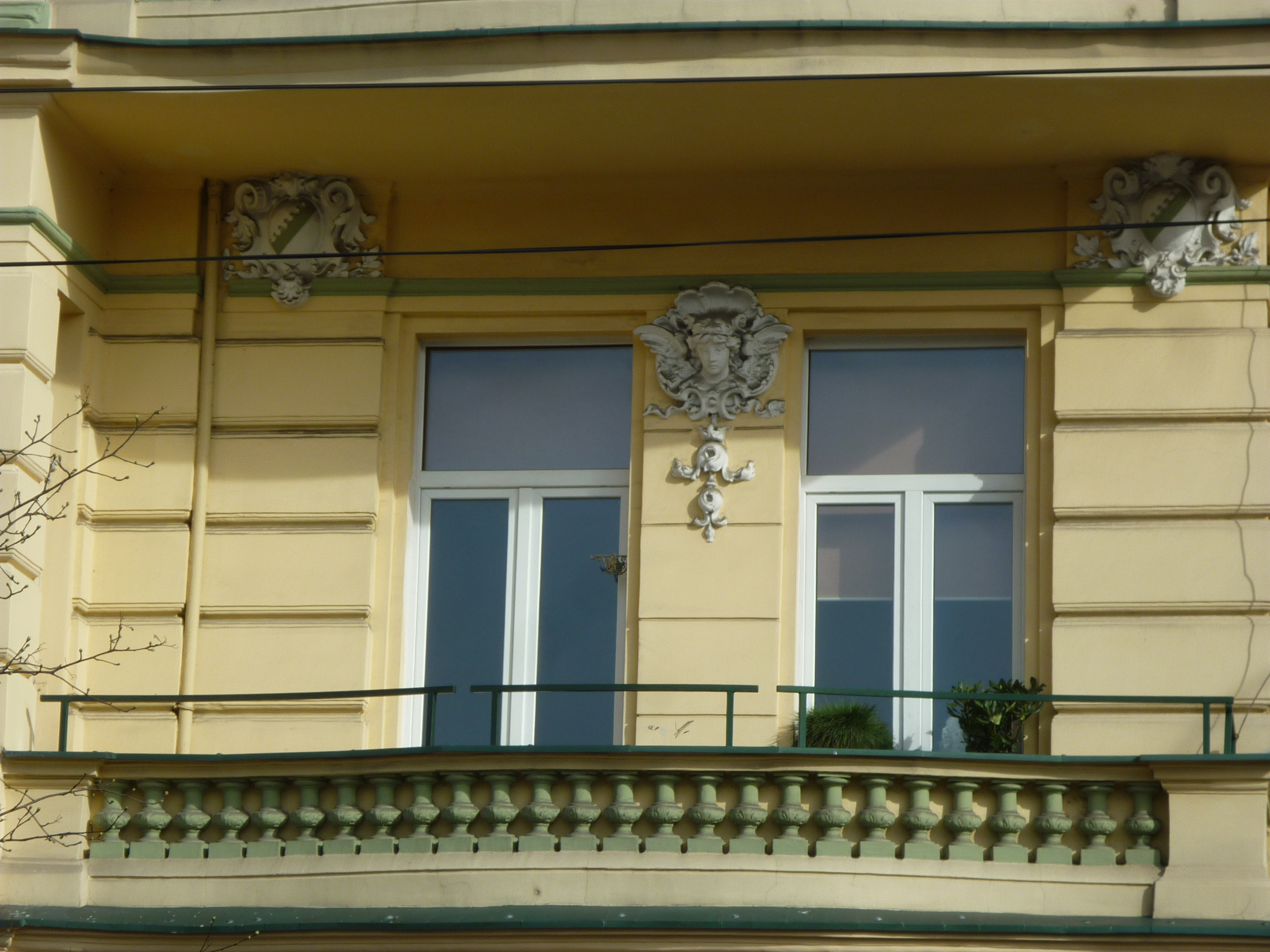
Detail of the 1st floor balcony

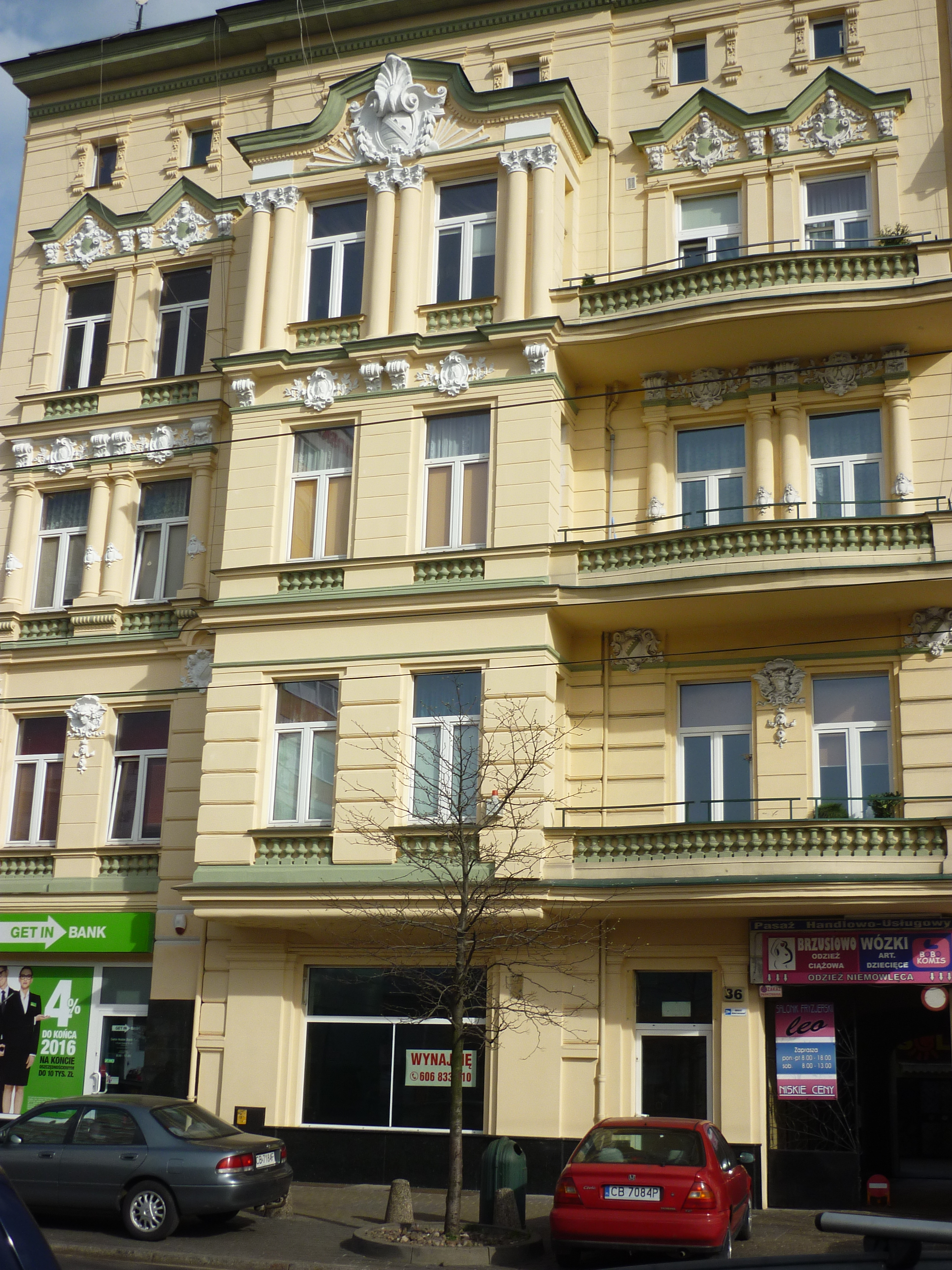
Facade overview after renovation

== See also ==
- Bydgoszcz
- Gdanska Street in Bydgoszcz
- Józef Święcicki

== Bibliography ==
- (in Polish) Bręczewska-Kulesza Daria, Derkowska-Kostkowska Bogna, Wysocka A. (2003). Ulica Gdańska. Przewodnik historyczny. Bydgoszcz: Wojewódzki Ośrodek Kultury w Bydgoszczy. ISBN 9788386970100.
- (in Polish) Bręczewska-Kulesza, Daria. Echa architektury starożytnej w budowlach bydgoskich XIX i początku XX wieku. Bydgoszcz.
