= Józef Święcicki =

Polish designer and builder (1859–1913)

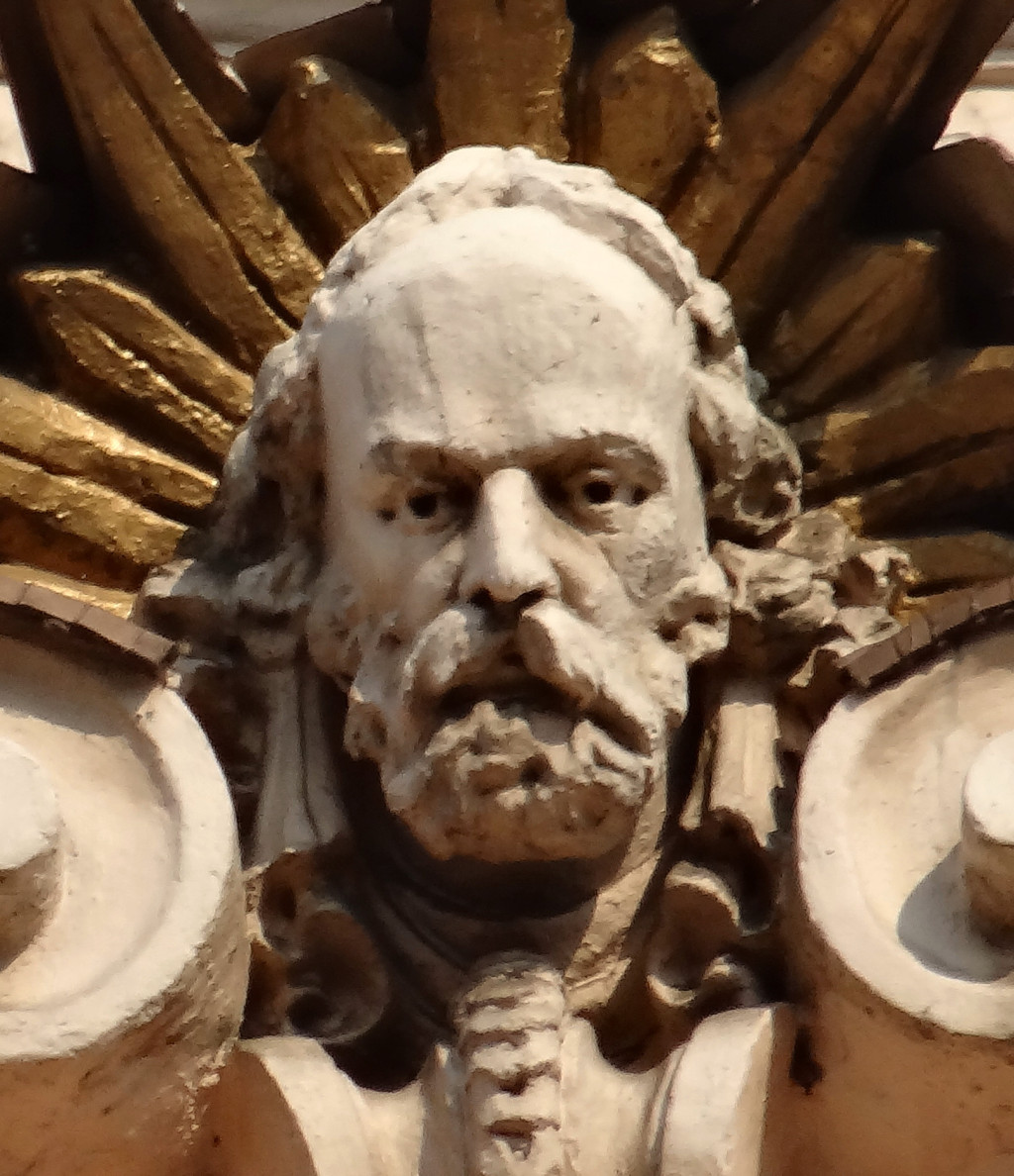
- Purported face of Józef Świecicki as carved on Hotel "Pod Orlem" facade in Bydgoszcz
- Born: 9 March 1859; Bydgoszcz, Kingdom of Prussia
- Died: 3 November 1913 (aged 54); Berlin, German Empire
- Occupation: architect
- Spouse: Maria Henrietta Ehrlich (1865 – c. 1942)

Signature
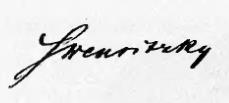

Józef Święcicki (Polish pronunciation: [ˈjuzɛf ɕfjɛ̃ˈt͡ɕit͡skʲi]; 9 March 1859 – 3 November 1913) was a designer and builder of Bydgoszcz, under Prussian rule. A vast majority of his eclectic-style works can still be found all around the city. Józef Swiecicki was part of architects and builders who gave a characteristic shape to the city at the turn of the 19th and 20th centuries, dominated by eclectic buildings with various styles, including Art Nouveau or Modernism.

== Life ==
Józef Stanisław Święcicki was born on 9 March 1859 in Bromberg. He was the son of Franciszek (1810–1863), a shoemaker and Michalina (1827–1912). He had four brothers and three sisters, all born and baptized in Bydgoszcz. His mother left Franciszek, his father, who had turned alcoholic and died at 54 from delirium (7 December 1863). Michalina took for second husband Anton Hoffmann (1823–c.1904), a city master bricklayer, who taught young Józef construction rudiments.

Around 1881, he graduated from secondary construction school and passed the state examination to become a builder (German: Baugewerksmeister). He performed professional training with Anton Hoffmann. He started to co-run with his stepfather a large design and construction business, Święcicki-Hoffmann studio, during a couple of years (from the mid-1880s to 1887), before taking the lead of his own firm until 1903. This decision to preside over his personal company is linked to his marriage in 1888, and his subsequent leaving the family home, a rented flat at 26 Gamm straße, today's 8 Warmińskiego street, near Focha street.

His most productive period as a designer in Bromberg was in the 1890s. He designed over 60 tenement houses in downtown district among which 21 projects on Gdańska Street, the main city thoroughfare. He also designed a number of other buildings in various places around the city, as well as outside Bydgoszcz. He set up in 1892 a stucco ornament factory (German: Fabrik von Stuckornamenten track Facaden- und Innendekoration), which products decorated the façades of its tenement houses. Located at 12 Kościuszki street, it soon became a profitable workshop. Even after its selling in the 1890s, the company, rebranded several times, operated until October 1912.

In 1898, he was commissioned by Józef Choraszewski, a Bromberg parish priest to work on the project of the Church of the Holy Trinity, but it was eventually realized by another architect, Roger Sławski. He left many admired works that stand out today in the architecture of Bydgoszcz. In particular, three projects are seen as icons of Neo-Baroque architecture:

- His own tenement house at 63 Gdańska Street, where he lived from 1896 to 1905;
- Hotel "Pod Orlem", also in Gdańska Street;
- Tenement at 1 Wolności Square.

A major part of his works was the construction of tenement houses according to his own designs on plots he had purchased, which were then sold with a profitable margin. In 1893 he became a board member of Bydgoski Bank Przemysłowy (Industrial Bank of Bydgoszcz), and then deputy chairman of the bank's supervisory board in 1909.

In October 1894, Święcicki purchased the property at 63 Gdańska Street, as well as probably few plots along Cieszkowskiego Street, to erect his own tenement. In September 1896, he moved to his new home with his family. He added a wing on Cieszkowskiego Street in 1899, to house his business headquarters where he worked till his death.

In 1905, the family settled in a newly erected house at 17 Adam Mickiewicz Alley: in the recess of the estate he built a garage, where he stored his own car, one of the few private vehicles in Bromberg at the time. He funded several educational institutions in the city in the 1910s to help out poor but talented students of Bydgoszcz.

In the autumn of 1913, he went on a journey by train to rest in the Western German Empire. On the way back, he fell down while climbing in Berlin underground train, and suffered concussion. This injury caused his death, on 2 November 1913, at Berlin's St Hedwig hospital. His body was transported back to Bydgoszcz and buried in the Nowofarny cemetery in Bydgoszcz.

== Personal life ==
Józef Święcicki from 1888 was married to Maria Henrietta Ehrlich (born in 1865 in Chełmno). On 30 April 1895, they adopted Hugo Rudolf Fiedler, an abandoned boy from an orphanage, born 1892 in Berlin.

His favorite pastime was chess, which he played during most of his free time. Logically, he co-founded the Bydgoszcz Chess Society in 1886, to which he belonged as an honorary member till 1910.

In addition to this successful real estate trade, he is the author of two pieces premiered in Bydgoszcz municipal theater (1901). He also published in 1910 an Illustrated Guide in Bydgoszcz (Polish: Ilustrowany Przewodnik w Bydgoszczy), in which he presented all major buildings in a shortened, popular form, complemented with address lists of facilities (hotels, restaurants ...). He also co-wrote a book about building conservation (Berlin, 1910).

His son Hugo Święcicki graduated from the Agricultural University in Bonn and lived in western Germany. His wife Maria, however, had been living in Bydgoszcz until his death (c. 1942), and preserved the memory of Józef Święcicki, through testimonies and scholarship donations.

== Style ==
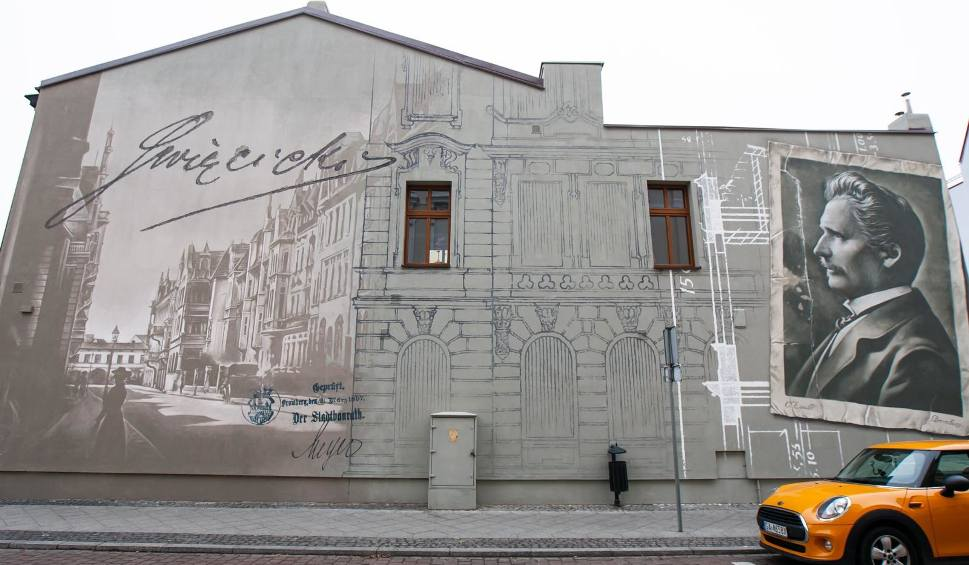
Józef Święcicki's mural at Cieszkowskiego street

Święcicki was rather a conservative creator. Most of his projects have dominantly an eclectic style, mostly prominent in its tenement houses, where one can perceive patterned detail arrangements with a forms of Historicism.

He boldly exploited elements of Renaissance, Mannerism and Baroque architecture. Święcicki's style is characterized by a passion for symmetry, rhythmical vertical divisions, accentuated by the arrangement of windows, pilasters and a multitude of stucco ornaments.

In November 2018, the city of Bydgoszcz honored the memory of the architect by dedicating a mural to Święcicki and his works, on a wall located at the corner of Gdańska and Cieszkowskiego Streets, in front of his former house

== Works in Bydgoszcz ==
Main preserved buildings by Józef Święcicki in Bydgoszcz
Year	Edifice	Remarks	Picture
1882	Tenement house	Located at 46 Śniadecki Street. Earliest surviving project realized in cooperation with his stepfather Anton Hoffmann.	
1882	Max Schmidt tenement	Located at 42 Śniadecki Street	
1883	Wing addition	Tenement located at 15 Podwale Street	
1885	Tenement house	Located at 100 Dworcowa Street in Bydgoszcz	
1885	Reinhold Zschiesche Tenement	Located at 1 Chocimska Street, corner with Gdańska Street	
1886	Rudolf Gehrke tenement	Located at 113 Gdańska Street	
1886	Tenement house	Located at 115 Gdańska Street	
1886	Tenement house	Located at 137 Gdańska Street	
1886	Hugo Bille Villa	Located at 3 Piotra Skargi Street. Registered on Kuyavian-Pomeranian Voivodeship heritage list	
1887	Tenement house	Located at 86 Gdańska Street	
1887	Tenement house	Located at 4 Dworcowa Street	
1888	Villa Hugo Hecht	Located at 88/30 Gdańska Street	
1889	Tenement house	Located at 64 Gdańska Street. The first house built under his own name.	
1889	Hugo Hecht tenement house	Located at 92/94 Gdańska Street. Registered on Kuyavian-Pomeranian Voivodeship heritage list	
1889	Adolf Hoffmann tenement house	Located at 7 Wool Market square	
1889	William Wick Tenement	Located at 30 Śniadeckich Street	
1890	Aleksander Theil Tenement	Located at 39 Dworcowa Street	
1891	Stanisław Rolbieski tenement	Located at 96Gdańska Street	
1891	Ludwig Schultz Tenement	Located at 54 Dworcowa Street	
1892	Carl Peschel tenement	Located at 101 Gdańska Street. Registered on Kuyavian-Pomeranian Voivodeship heritage list	
1893	Tenement houses	Located at 1/3 Stary Port Street. Registered on Kuyavian-Pomeranian Voivodeship heritage list	

Main preserved buildings by Józef Święcicki in Bydgoszcz
Year	Edifice	Remarks	Picture
1893	Robert Aron Tenement	Located at 36 Jagiellońska street	
1893	Albert Voigt tenement	Located at 38 Śniadeckich Street	
1893	Hotel "Pod Orlem"	Located at 14 Gdańska Street. Registered on Kuyavian-Pomeranian Voivodeship heritage list	
1894	Pharmacy Pod Lwem (Under the lion)	Located at 37 Grunwaldzka street in Bydgoszcz	
1895	Oskar Ewald Tenement	Located at 30 Gdańska Street	
1895	Franz Bauer Tenement	Located at 30 Jagiellońska street	
1895	Józef Święcicki tenement	Located at 63 Gdańska Street. Registered on Kuyavian-Pomeranian Voivodeship heritage list	
1895	Carl Bradtke Tenement	Located at 93 Gdańska Street. Registered on Kuyavian-Pomeranian Voivodeship heritage list	
1896	Tenement house	Located at 48 Pomorska Street. Registered on Kuyavian-Pomeranian Voivodeship heritage list	
1896	Wilhelm Kopp's Tenement	Located at 2 Wool Market square	
1896	Albert Voigt Tenement	Located at 5 Pomorska Street. Registered on Kuyavian-Pomeranian Voivodeship heritage list	
1896	Tenement at 1 Freedom Square	Registered on Kuyavian-Pomeranian Voivodeship heritage list	
1896	Tenement house	Located at 69 Gdańska Street	
1897	Tenement house	Located at 5 Kołłątaja street	
1897	Theonia Reichhardt House	Located at 36 Gdańska Street	
1897	Gustav Reschke's house	Located at 17 Cieszkowskiego Street	
1898	Gustav Reschke's house	Located at 11 Cieszkowskiego Street. Registered on Kuyavian-Pomeranian Voivodeship heritage list	
1899	Tenement house	Located at 4 Cieszkowskiego Street. Project by Józef Święcicki, realized by Rudolf Kern.	
1899	Tenement house	Located at 8 Cieszkowskiego Street	
1905	Józef Święcicki Villa	Located at 17 Adam Mickiewicz Alley	
1911	Tadeusz Browicz Hospital for Infectious Diseases in Bydgoszcz	Located at 10/18 Świętego Floriana Street, along the Brda river	

== See also ==
- Bydgoszcz
- Bydgoszcz Architects (1850-1970s)
- List of Polish people

== Bibliography ==
- DERKOWSKA-KOSTKOWSKA, BOGNA (2001). Józef Święcicki - szkic do biografii bydgoskiego budowniczego. MATERIAŁY DO DZIEJOW KULTURY I SZTUKI BYDGOSZCZY I REGIONU 6 (in Polish). Bydgoszcz: Pracownia dokumentacji i popularyzacji zabytków wojewódzkiego ośrodka kultury w Bydgoszczy. pp. 32–50.
- Stanisław Błażejewski, Janusz Kutta, Marek Romaniuk (2000). Bydgoski słownik biograficzny: praca zbiorowa. T.6 (in Polish). Bydgoszcz: Kujawsko-Pomorskie Tow. Kulturalne. pp. 109, 110. ISBN 8385327584.
