= Józef Święcicki Tenement =

Józef Święcicki tenement in Bydgoszcz
- Polish: Kamienica Józefa Święcickiego w Bydgoszczy
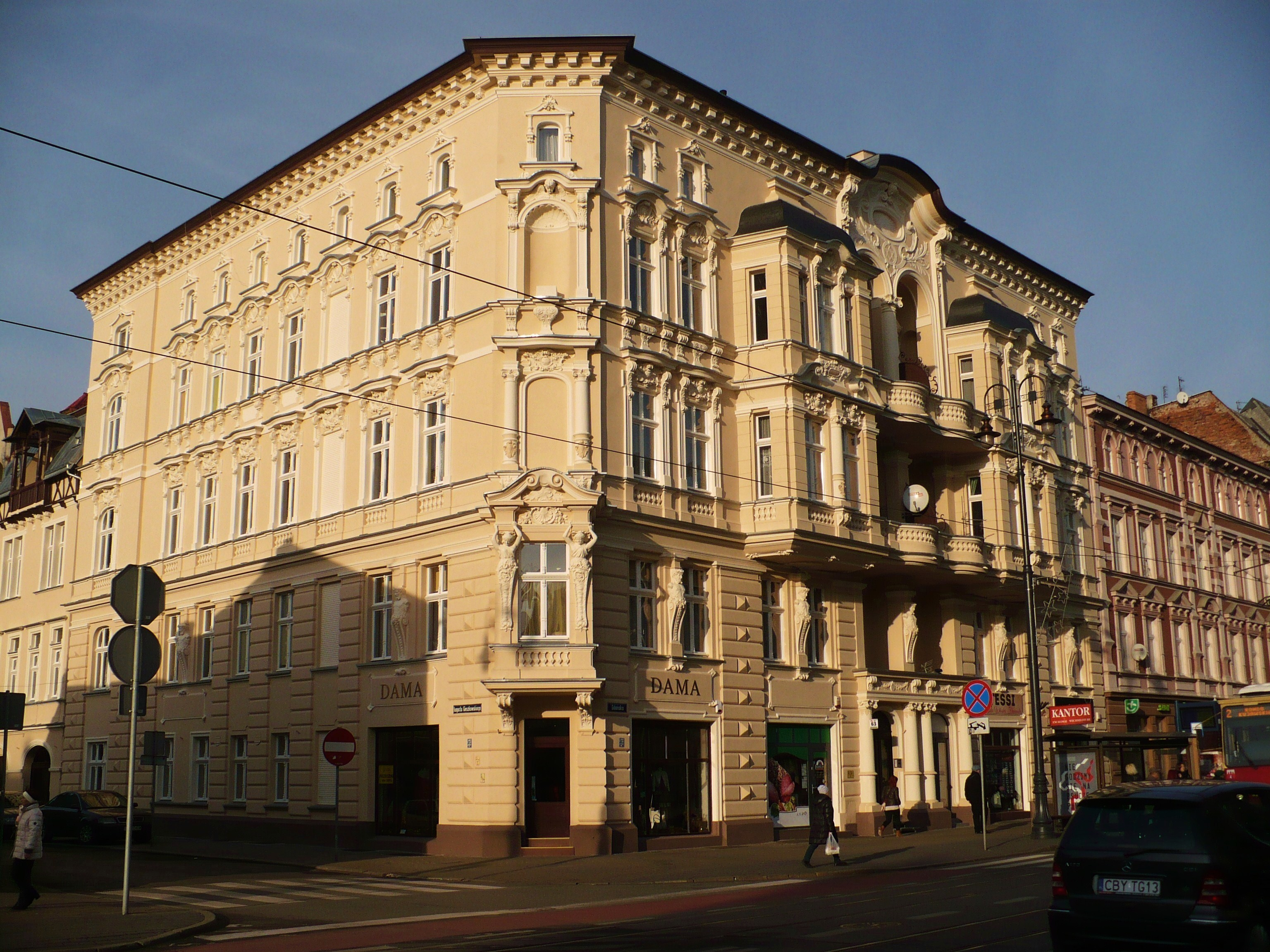
- View from Gdańska street
- Interactive map of the Józef Święcicki tenement in Bydgoszcz area

General information
- Type: Tenement
- Architectural style: Eclecticism, Neo-Renaissance & Neo-Baroque
- Classification: Nr.601309-Reg.A/1046, May 25, 1991
- Location: 63 Gdańska street, Bydgoszcz, Poland, Poland
- Coordinates: 53°7′50″N 18°0′27″E
- Construction started: 1895
- Completed: 1897
- Client: Józef Święcicki

Technical details
- Floor count: 4

Design and construction
- Architect: Józef Święcicki

The Józef Święcicki tenement is a habitation building in downtown Bydgoszcz, registered on the Kuyavian-Pomeranian Voivodeship Heritage List.

== Location ==
The building stands on western side of Gdańska Street at Nr.63, at the intersection with Cieszkowskiego street.

== History ==
Premises have been bought by Bydgoszcz's architect Józef Święcicki in October 1894. In August 1895, he started to build his own house, according to his own design: the result is one of the most impressive architectural achievements of Józef Święcicki in Gdańska Street. He lived there from 1898 to 1905.

In the same area, he also realized other edifices:

- Hotel "Pod Orlem" at 14 Gdańska street;
- Oskar Ewald Tenement at 30 Gdańska street;
- Tenement at 86 Gdańska street;
- Tenement at 1 Freedom Square.

Because of the rich architectural design, the initial cost of construction was exceeded by 65%. Józef Święcicki moved to his house, then located at 38 Danzigerstraße in autumn 1896, with his wife Mary and their adopted son Hugo.

In 1896, the architect expanded the edifice on Cieszkowskiego street, and three years later he added another floor to the structure, using wattle and daub technique, with the supervision of his colleague Rudolf Kern. Joseph Święcicki had his business office housed in the wing onto Cieszkowskiego street. The tenement was used as a real showcase towards potential customers, enhancing Święcicki's own capabilities and creative skills by displaying lushly adorned facades.

In the 1910s, Dr Max Graeupner lived in the tenement: he was the head of the Women's clinic located at today's 8 20 Stycznia 1920 Street.

In the 1920s, the building housed a fashion warehouse for men and military supplies depot.

In July 2008, a plaque in memory of Józef Święcicki has been placed on the wing onto Cieszkowskiego street.

== Architecture ==
The building is a four-storey townhouse, with a footprint based on a U-shape with a beveled corner. The style of the building is Eclecticism, with rich Neo-Renaissance and Neo-Baroque decorations. Among the stucco motifs, in the middle of the third floor onto Gdańska Street, one can notice:

- a set of compass and square, symbolizing the profession of the owner;
- a towering sun at the top.

The building has various loggias, balconies and bay windows adorned with rich stuccoes. Inside is standing a palatial staircase with mirrors.

The building has been put on the Kuyavian-Pomeranian Voivodeship Heritage List, Nr.601309 Reg.A/1046 on May 25, 1991.

== Gallery ==
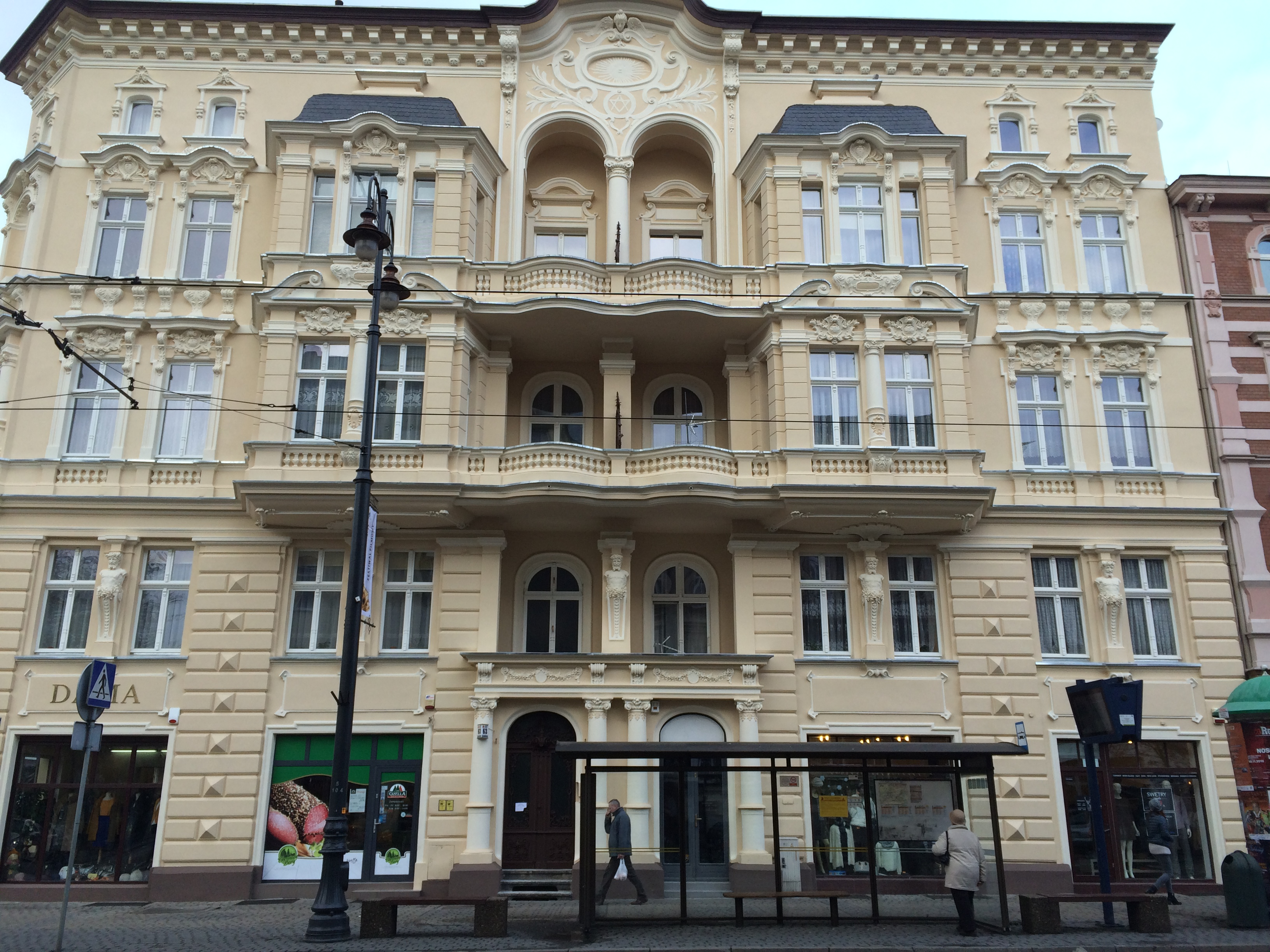
Facade onto Gdańska street

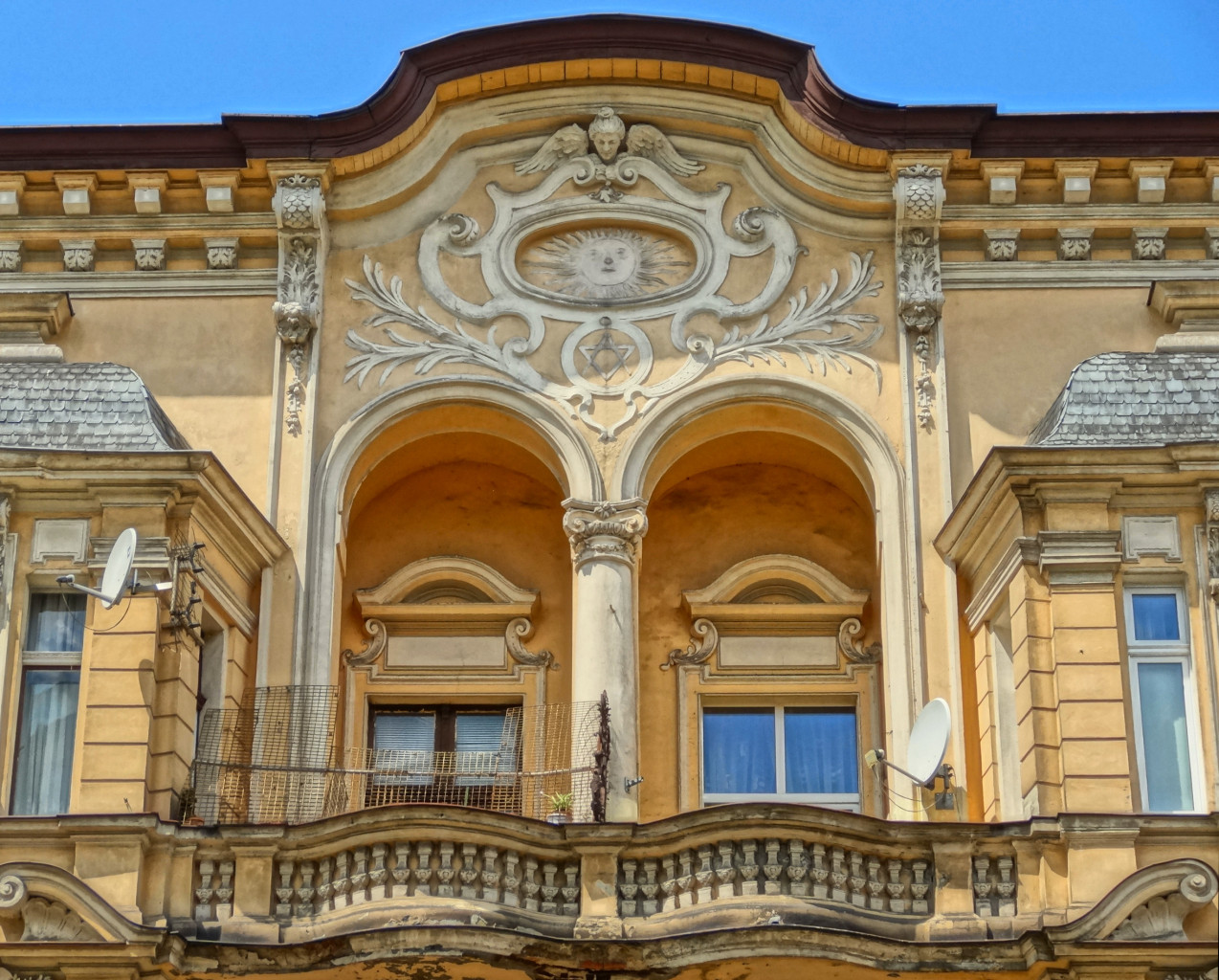
Detail of the top floor balcony

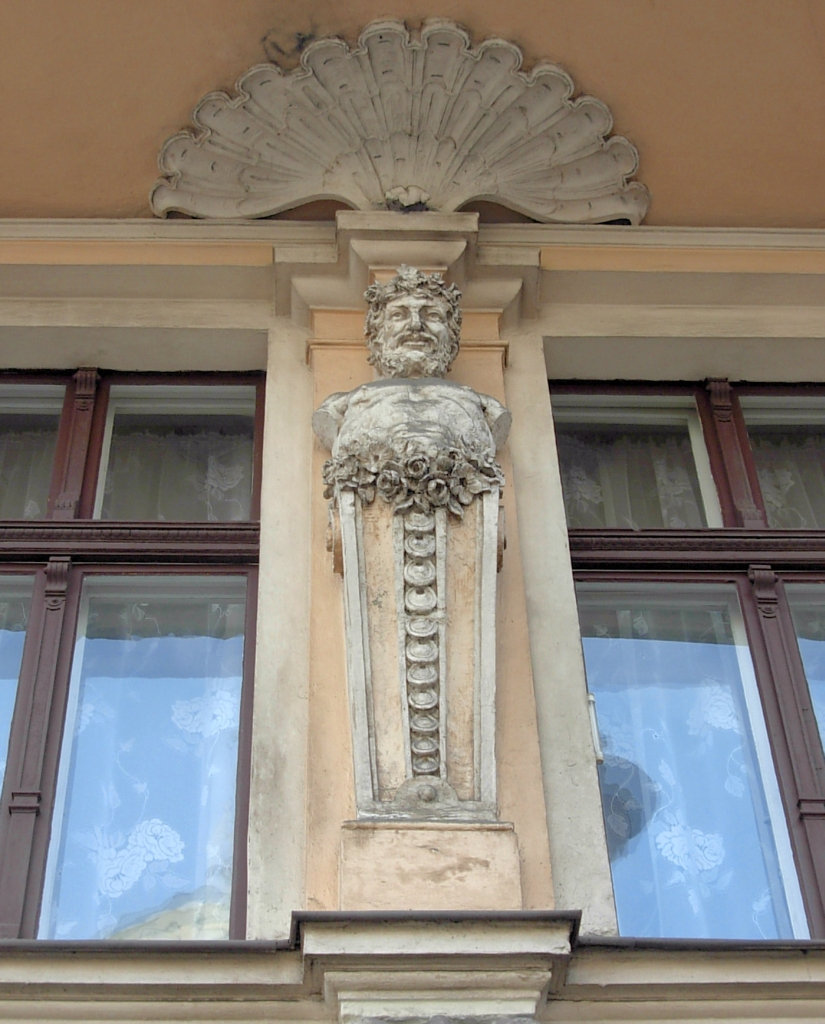
Detail of a sculpture

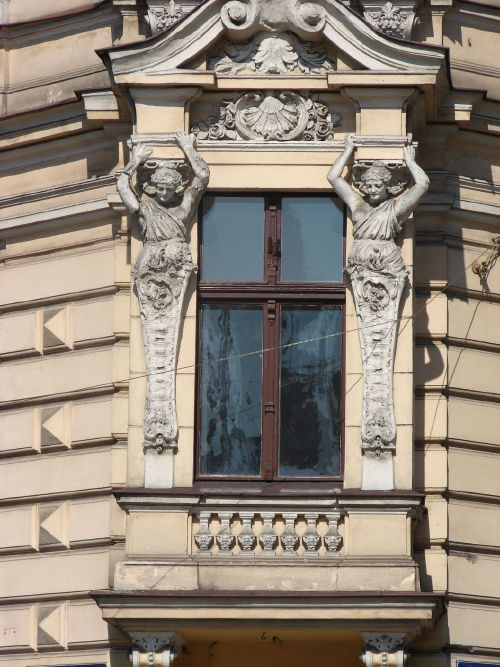
Detail of caryatids

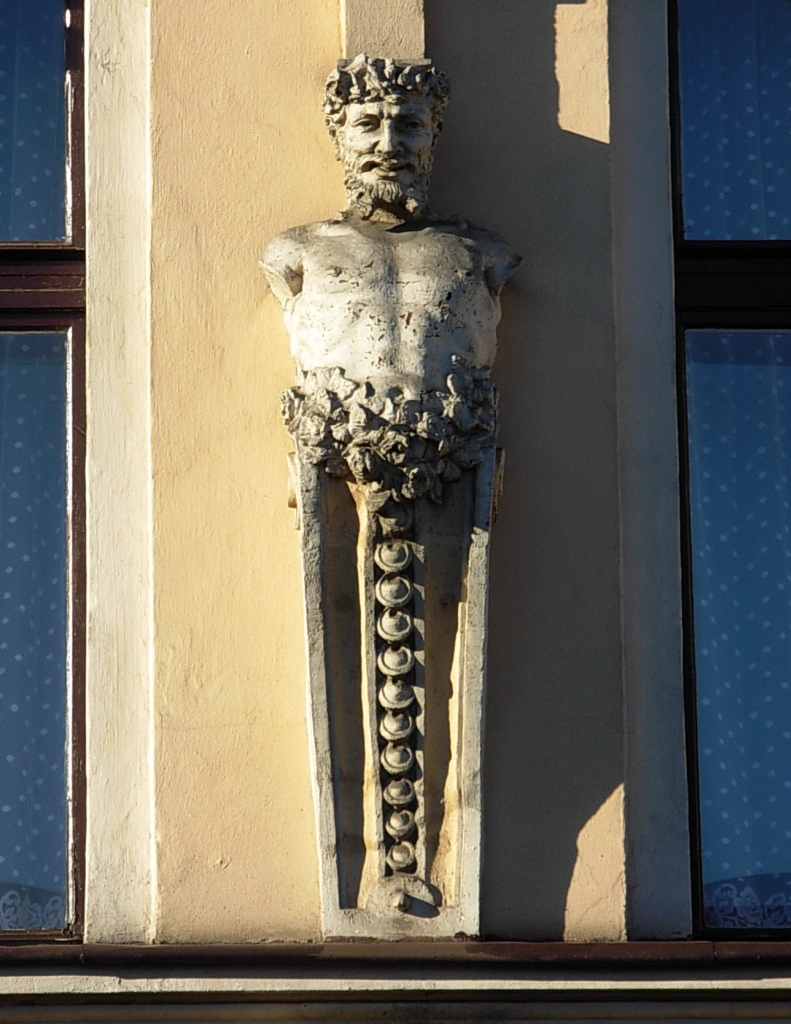
Statue detail

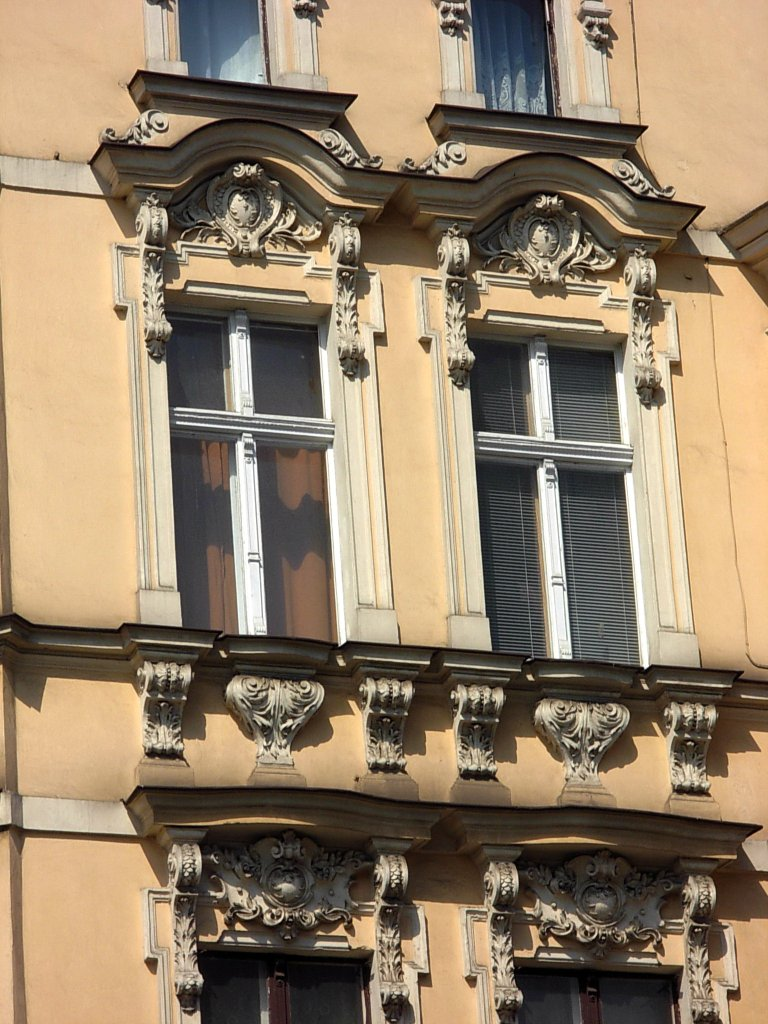
Detail on windows decoration

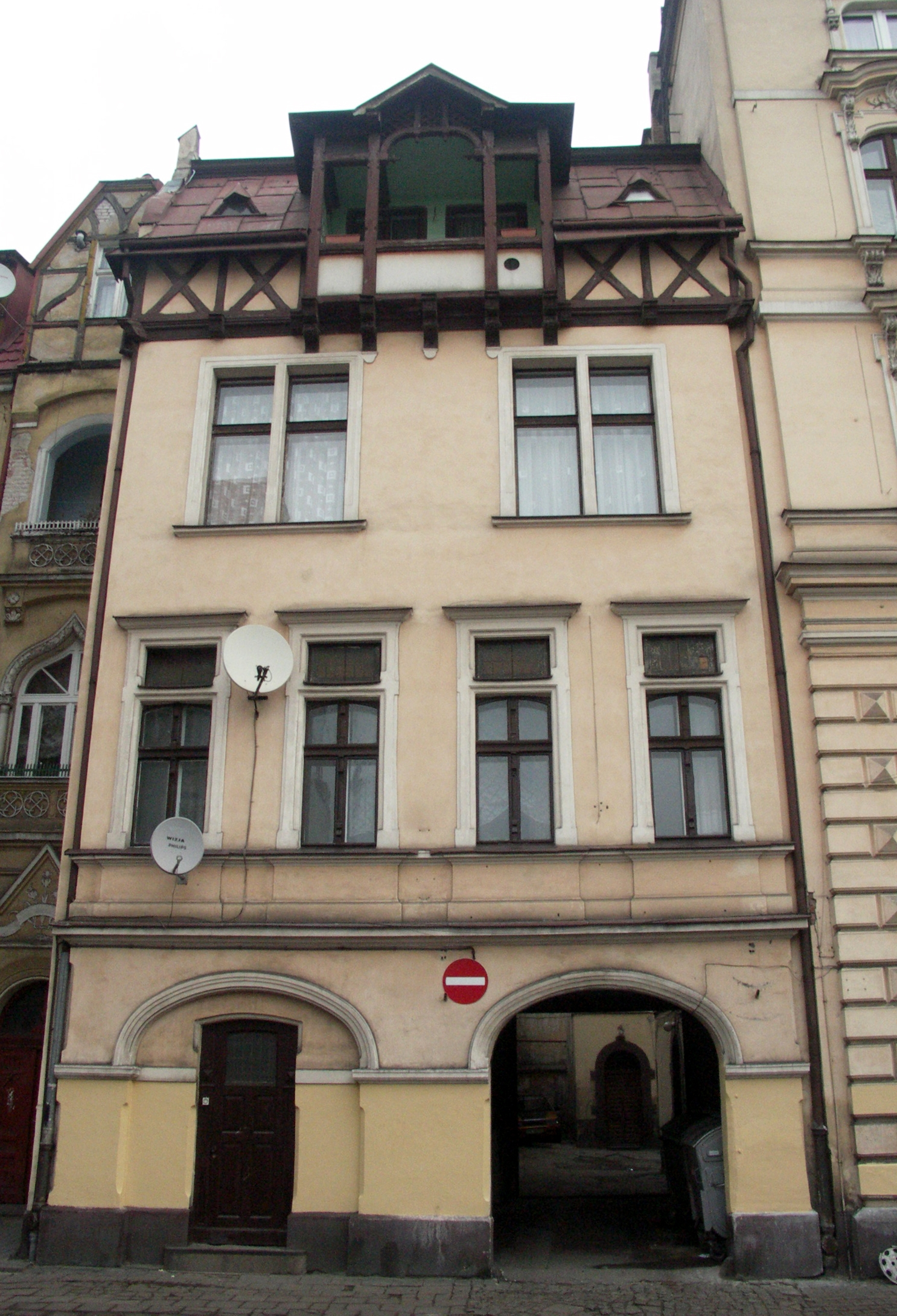
Extension on Cieszkowski street

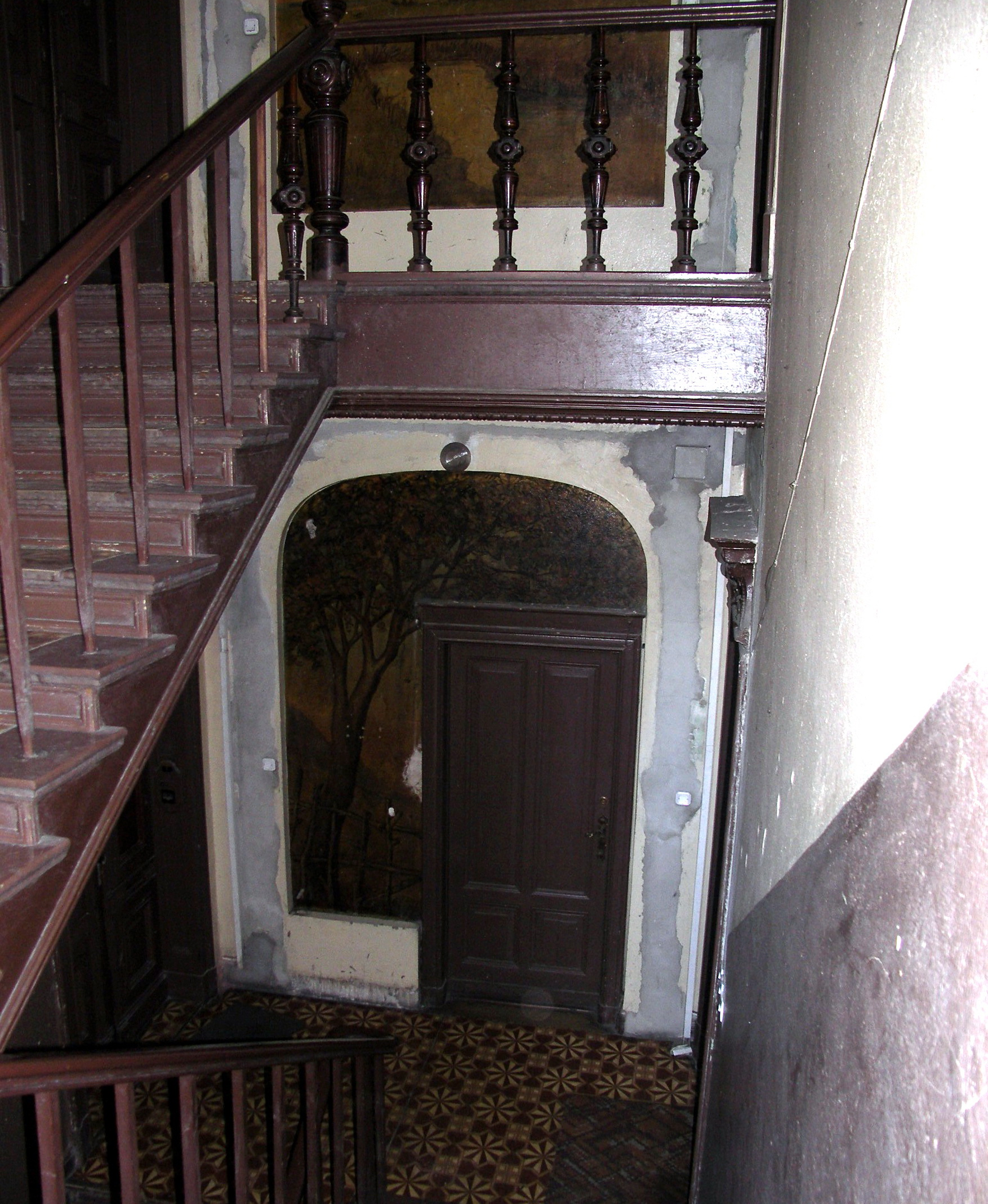
Interiors with staircase

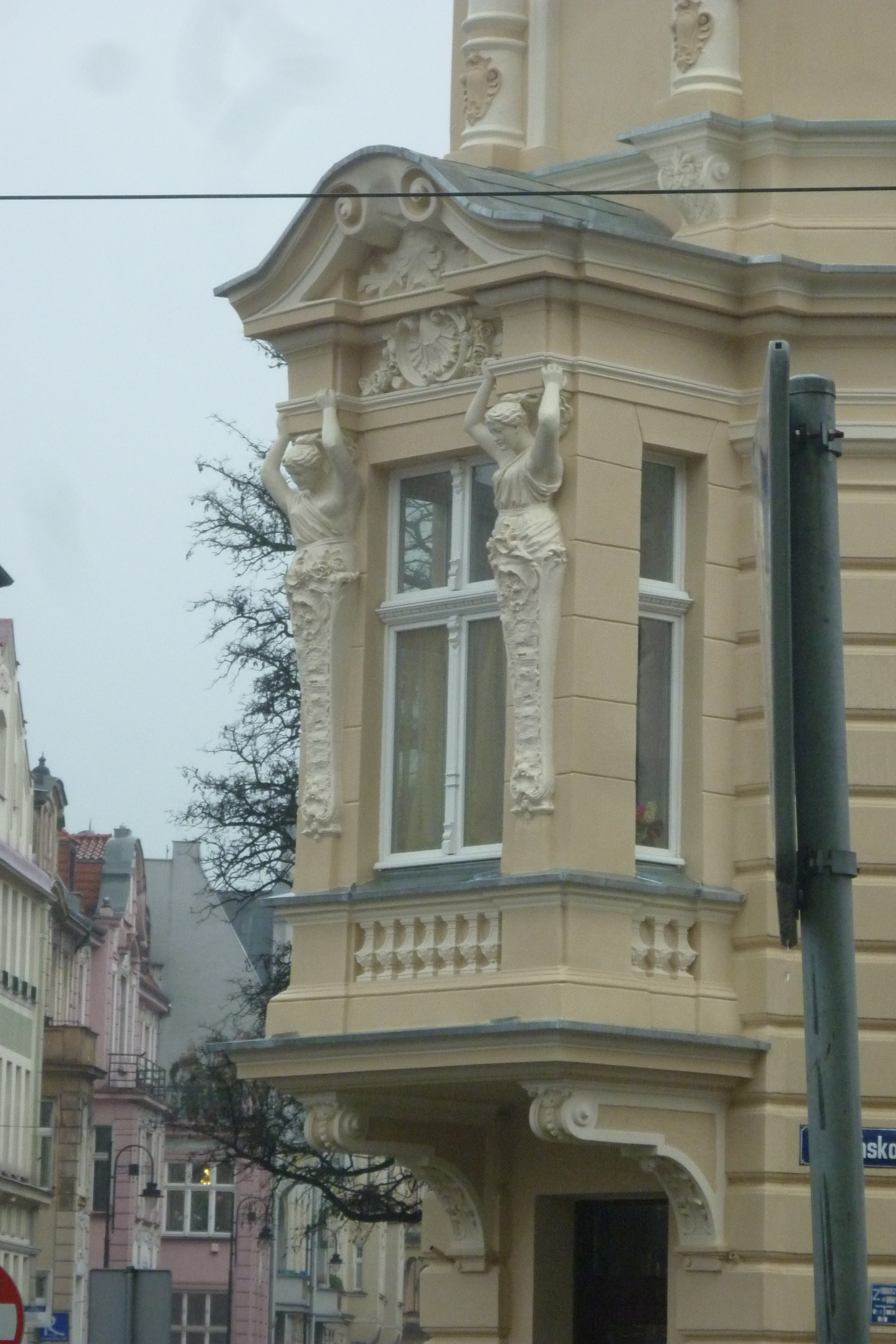
Bay window detail

== See also ==
- Bydgoszcz
- Gdanska Street in Bydgoszcz
- August Cieszkowski Street in Bydgoszcz
- Józef Święcicki

== Bibliography ==
- (in Polish) Bręczewska-Kulesza Daria, Derkowska-Kostkowska Bogna, Wysocka A. (2003). Ulica Gdańska. Przewodnik historyczny. Bydgoszcz: Wojewódzki Ośrodek Kultury w Bydgoszczy. ISBN 9788386970100.
- (in Polish) Winter, Piotr (1996). Ulica Augusta Cieszkowskiego w Bydgoszczy. Zespół architektoniczny z przełomu XIX i XX wieku. Bydgoszcz: Wojewódzki Ośrodek Kultury w Bydgoszczy. ISBN 9788386970049.
