= Gdańsk Street 86, Bydgoszcz =

Tenement at Gdanska street 86
- Polish: Kamienica Gdańska 86 w Bydgoszczy
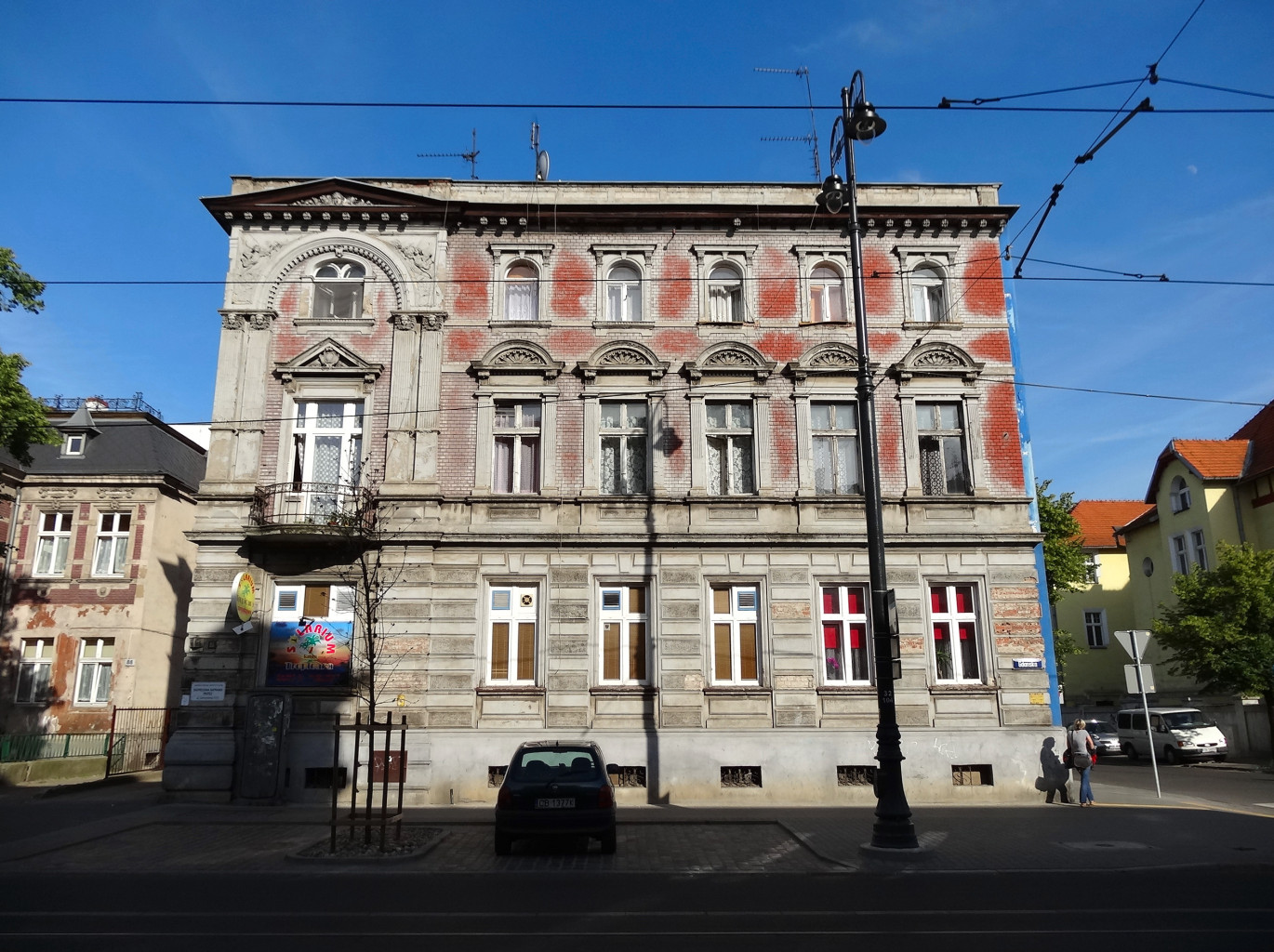
- Tenement from Gdanska Street
- Interactive map of the Tenement at Gdanska street 86 area

General information
- Type: Tenement
- Architectural style: Eclecticism & French Neo-Renaissance
- Location: 86 Gdanska Street, Bydgoszcz, Poland
- Coordinates: 53°8′00″N 18°0′40″E
- Groundbreaking: 1887
- Completed: 1888
- Client: Hugo Hecht

Technical details
- Floor count: 3

Design and construction
- Architect: Józef Święcicki

The tenement at 86 Gdanska street is a historical habitation building located at 86 Gdanska Street, in Bydgoszcz, Poland.

== Location ==
The building stands on the eastern side of Gdańska Street at the intersection with Zamoyskiego street.

It stands close to remarkable tenements in the same street:

- Ernst Bartsch tenement at 79;
- Paul Storz Tenement at 81;
- Villa Carl Grosse at 84;
- Otto Riedl Tenement at 85;
- Tenement at 91 Gdanska street.

== History ==
The house was built in 1887-1888 for wood dealer Hugo Hecht and designed by architect Joseph Święcicki. At the time, the address was 126 Danzigerstrasse.

It opens up a string of six close stylish buildings ordered by Hugo Hecht and built by Joseph Święcicki, all located on the same side of Gdańska street, and produced annually in the 1880s and 1890s.

Immediately after the construction, the house was sold to the superintendent Ludwig Hollweg who installed a wrought iron gate.

Shortly after, the building was bought by Otto Pfefferkorn, manager of a large furniture factory in Bydgoszcz, still active today under the name Bydgoskie Fabryki Mebli S.A.. Otto Pfefferkorn had another building built at 2 Jagiellonska Street in 1912.

From April 1, 1939, till 1945, Kazimierz Orlicz, a Bydgoszcz architect, ran his own design office in this tenement.

== Architecture ==
The house boasts an eclectic facade reminiscing French Renaissance style. Putti and sirens stucco reliefs are nicely mounted on decorative plaster and brick and facade.

In the same area, Józef Święcicki also realized other edifices:

- Hotel "Pod Orlem" at 14 Gdańska Street;
- Oskar Ewald Tenement at 30 Gdańska Street;
- Józef Święcicki tenement at 63 Gdańska Street;
- Tenement at 1 Plac Wolności.

== Gallery ==
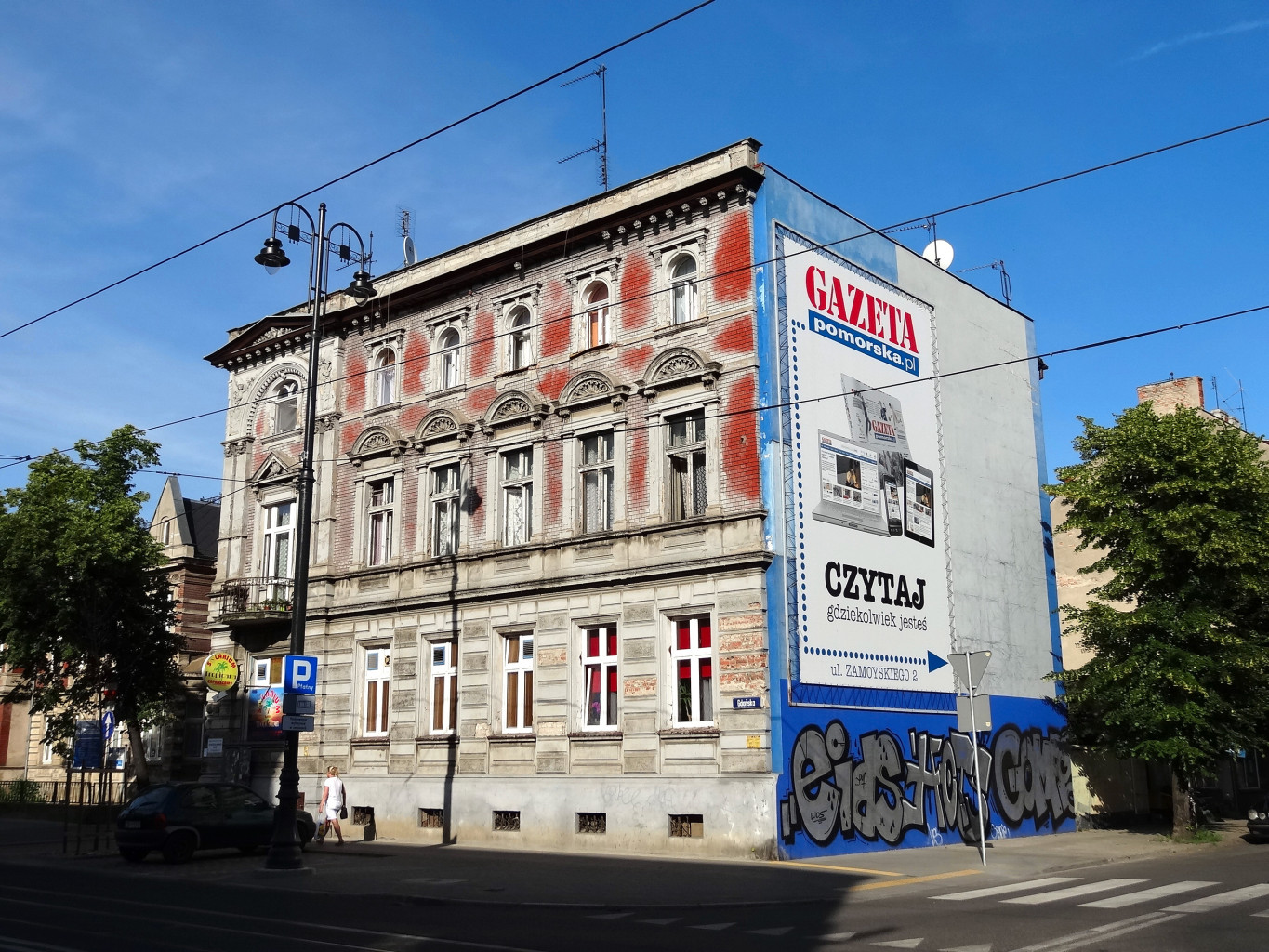
View from Gdanska street

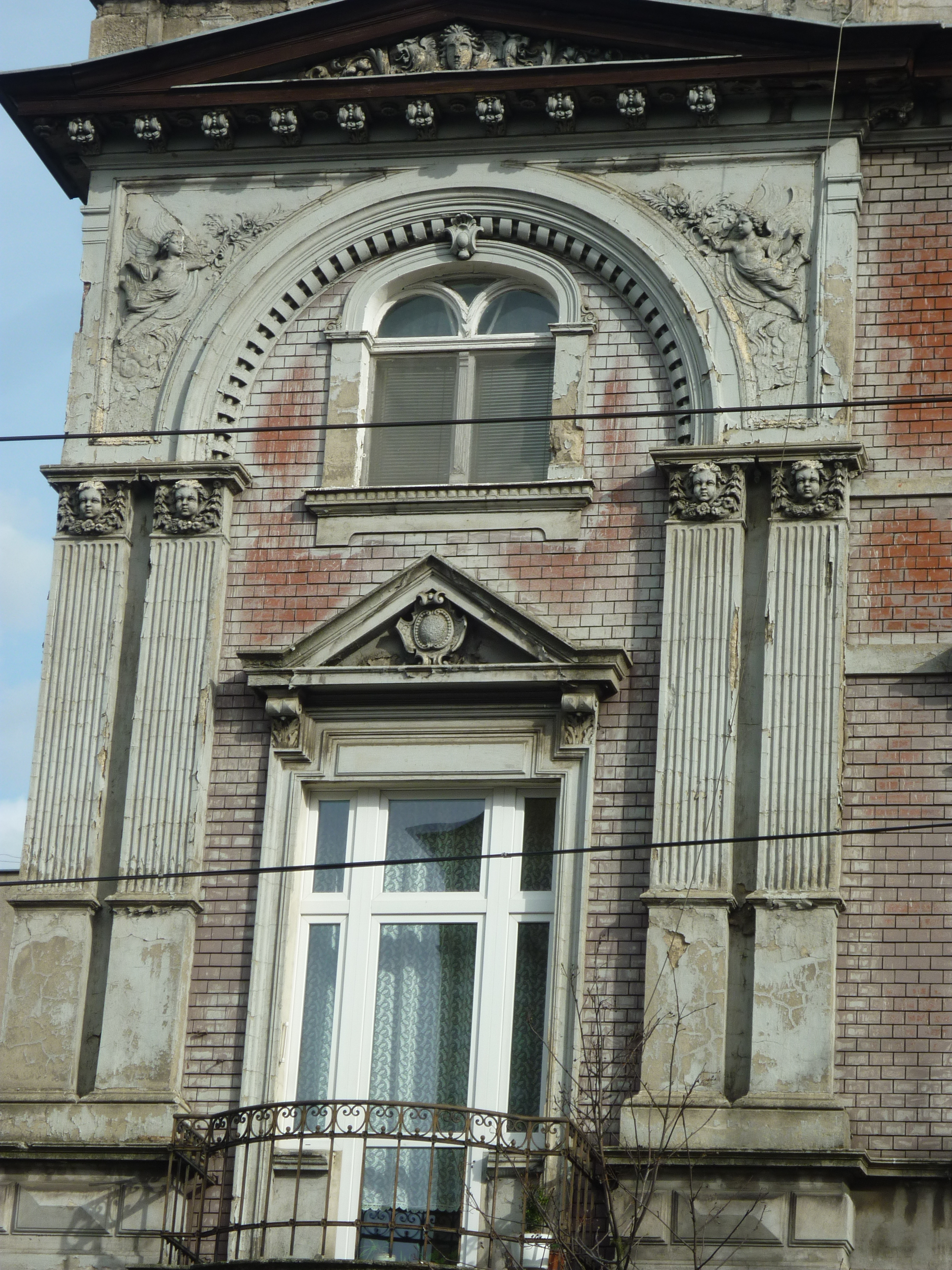
Facade reliefs details

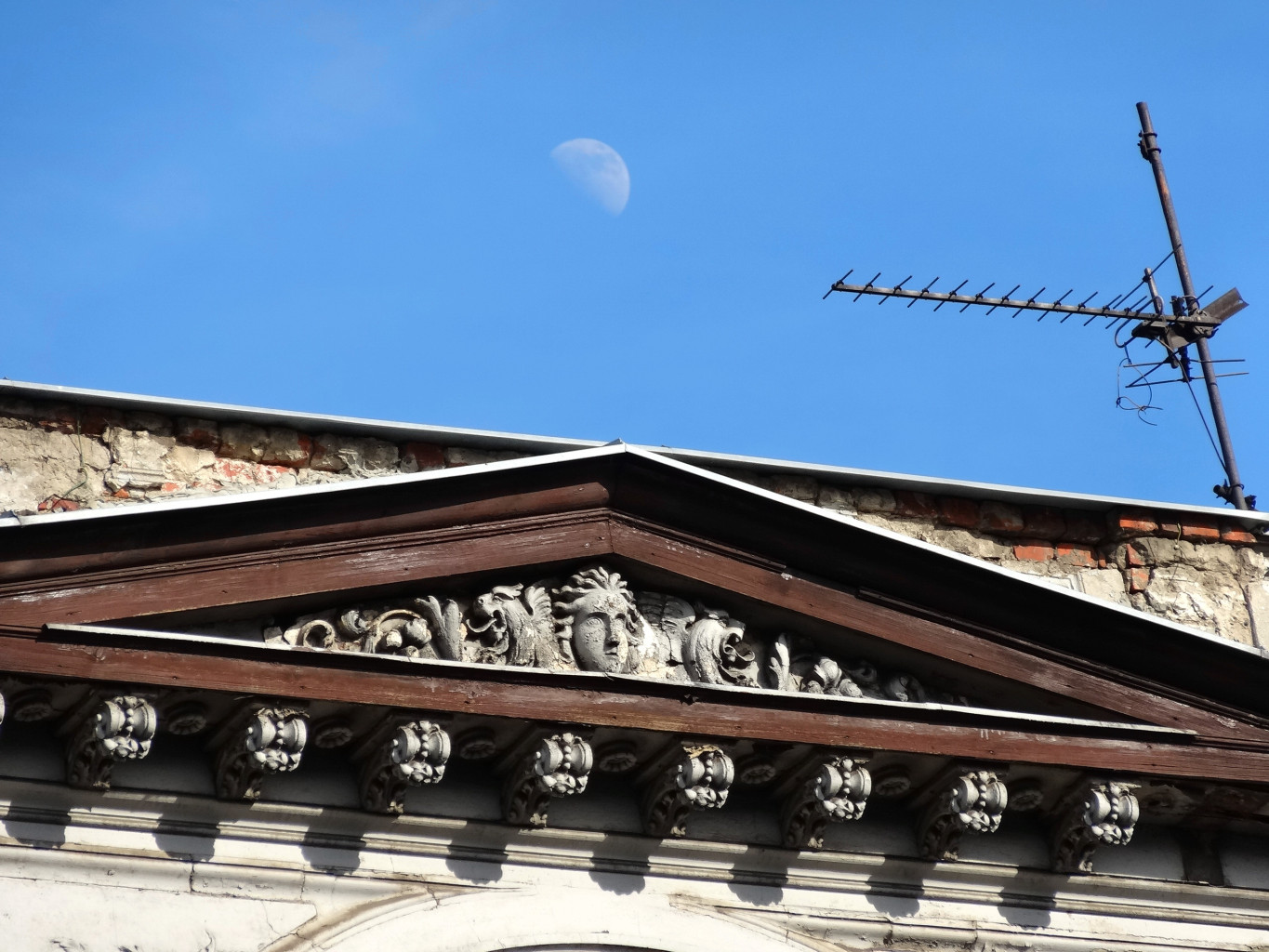
Tympanum

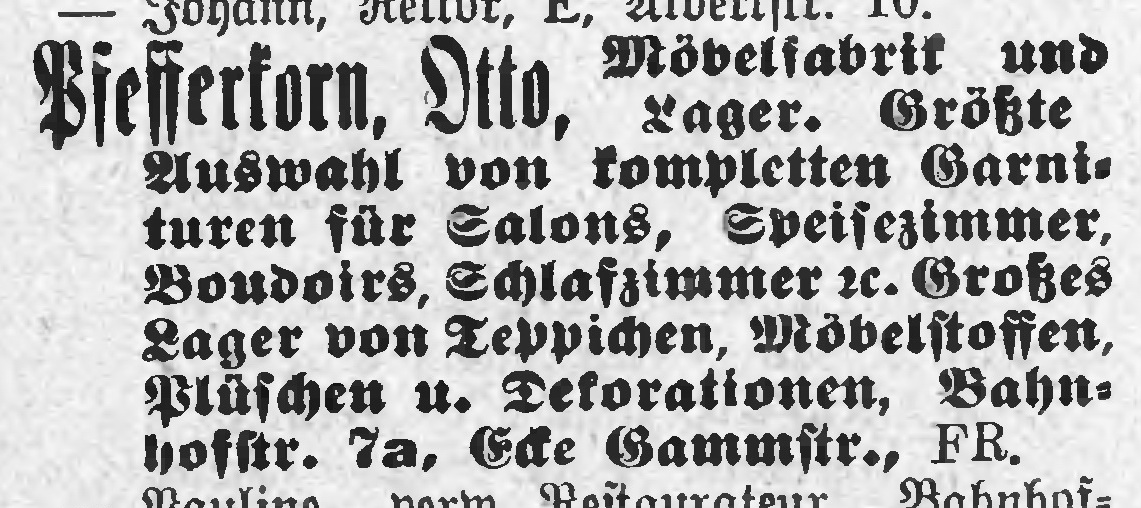
Advertising for Otto Pfefferkorn in 1900

== See also ==
- Bydgoszcz
- Gdanska Street in Bydgoszcz
- Józef Święcicki

== Bibliography ==
- Bręczewska-Kulesza Daria, Derkowska-Kostkowska Bogna, Wysocka A. (2003). Ulica Gdańska. Przewodnik historyczny (in Polish). Bydgoszcz: Wojewódzki Ośrodek Kultury w Bydgoszczy. ISBN 8386970103.
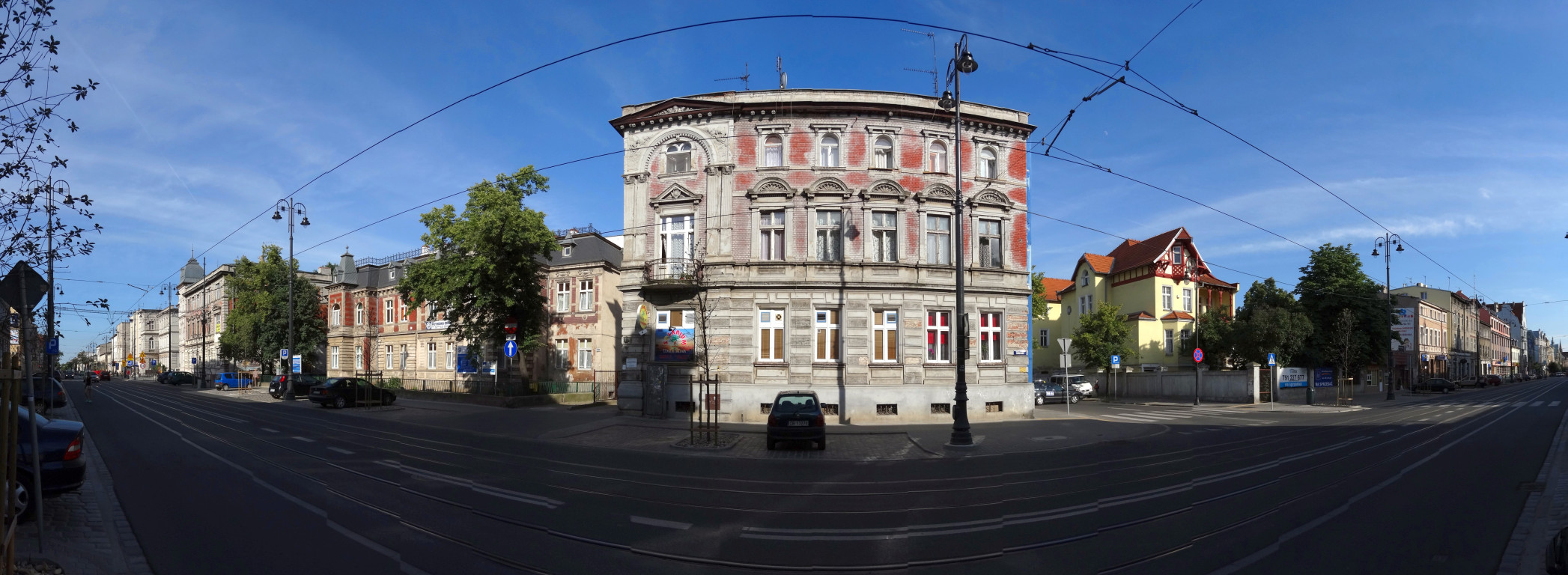
Gdanska street panorama centered on Nr.86 with Villa Carl Grosse on the right
