= Oskar Ewald Tenement =

- Polish: Kamienica Oskara Ewalda w Bydgoszczy
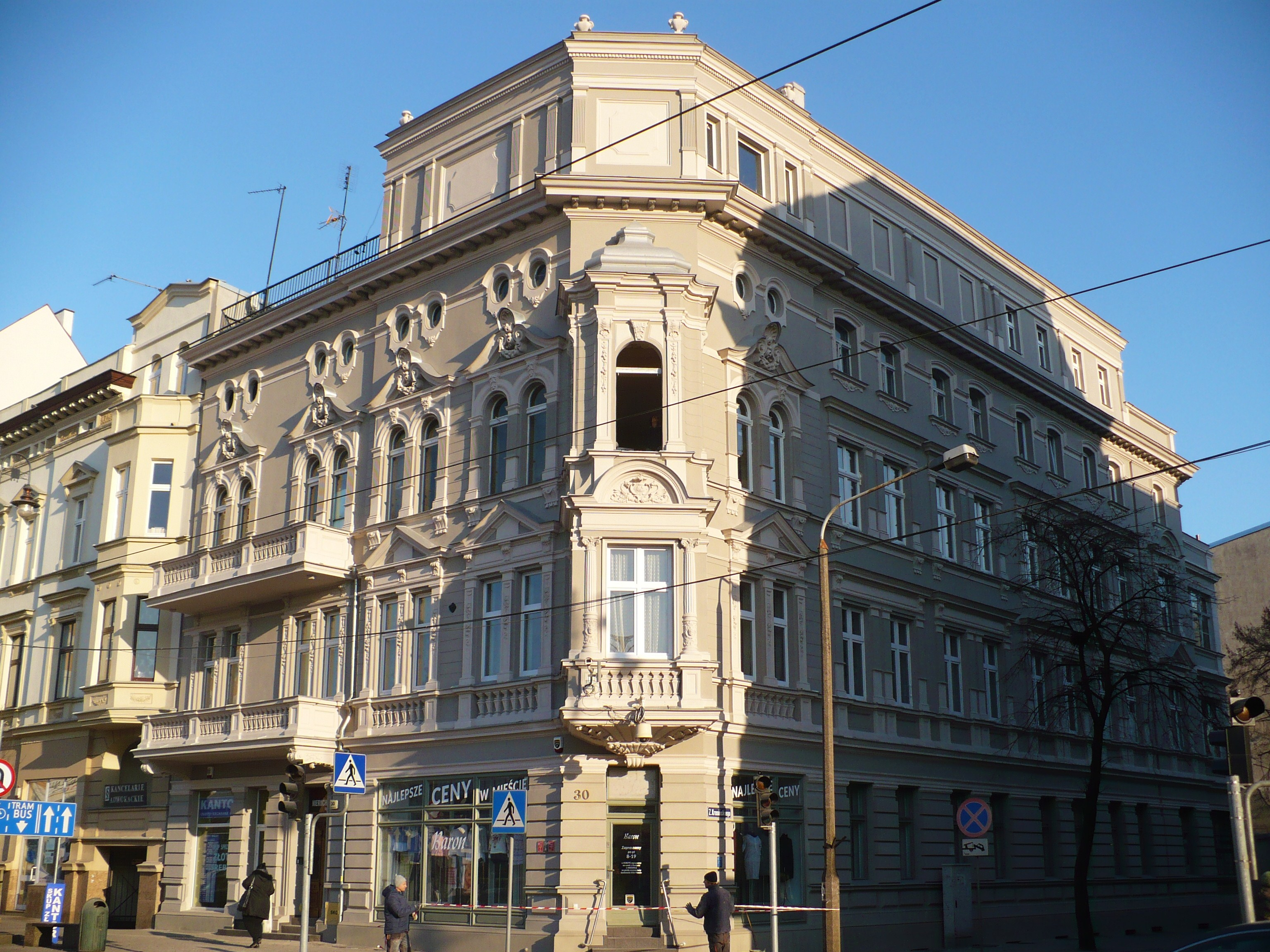
- View from Gdańska street
- Interactive map of the Oskar Ewald Tenement area

General information
- Type: Tenement
- Architectural style: Eclecticism
- Location: 30 Gdańska street, Bydgoszcz, Poland, Poland
- Coordinates: 53°7′42″N 18°0′22″E
- Construction started: 1895
- Completed: 1896
- Client: Oskar Ewald

Technical details
- Floor count: 3

Design and construction
- Architect: Józef Święcicki

The Oskar Ewald Tenement is a tenement located at 30 Gdańska Street, at the intersection with Krasinski Street, in Bydgoszcz, Poland.

== History ==
The house was built in 1895-1896 for the photographer Oskar Ewald. In the address book of the city of Bromberg, his details are "154 Danzigerstrasse".

The architect was Józef Święcicki. He was working at the same period on the following buildings:

- Hotel "Pod Orlem", at 14 Gdańska Street;
- Józef Święcicki tenement, at 63 Gdańska street;
- Tenement at 86 Gdańska street;
- Carl Bradtke Tenement, at 96 Gdańska street;
- Villa Hugo Hecht at 88/90 Gdańska street;
- Tenement at 1 Freedom Square.

== Architecture ==
For Oskar Ewald's edifice, Józef Święcicki used characteristics of Eclecticism to adorn the facade, and especially neo-Baroque features. Its essential three-storey neo-baroque body is topped with a prominent cornice.

The top floor of the building housed originally Oskar Ewald's photographic studio. It had the corner-shape of the curved facade, and was covered by a glass roof. The workshop occupied also the first two levels: a dedicated lift was used by customers to access the studio. In 1919, Władysława Spiżewska, the first Polish woman to become a professional photographer in Bydgoszcz purchased the photo atelier at the top floor and used it till 1924.

At the beginning of the 20th century, the ground floor of the building housed a flower shop run by Anna Stössel.

== Gallery ==
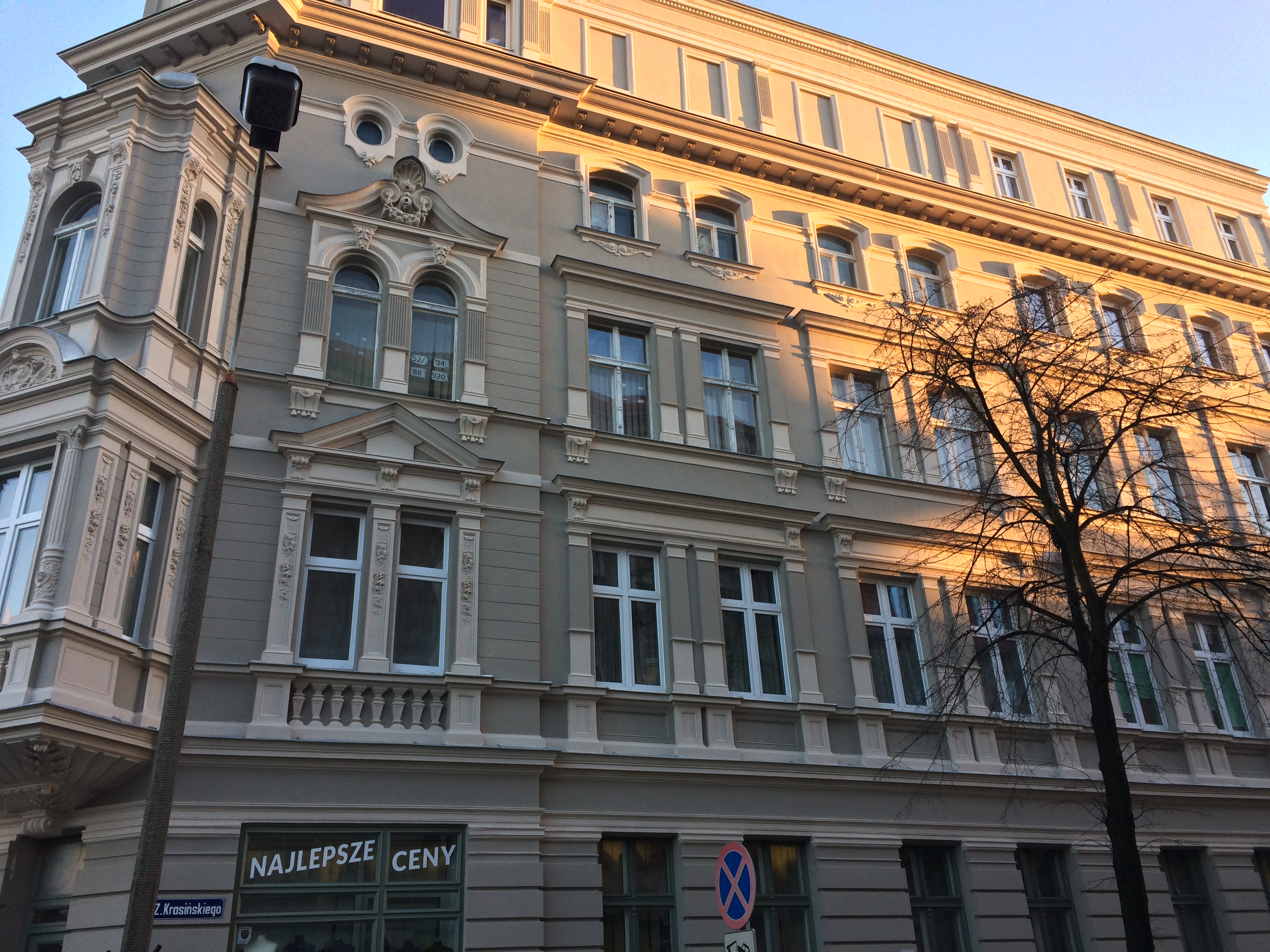
Facade on Śniadecki Street

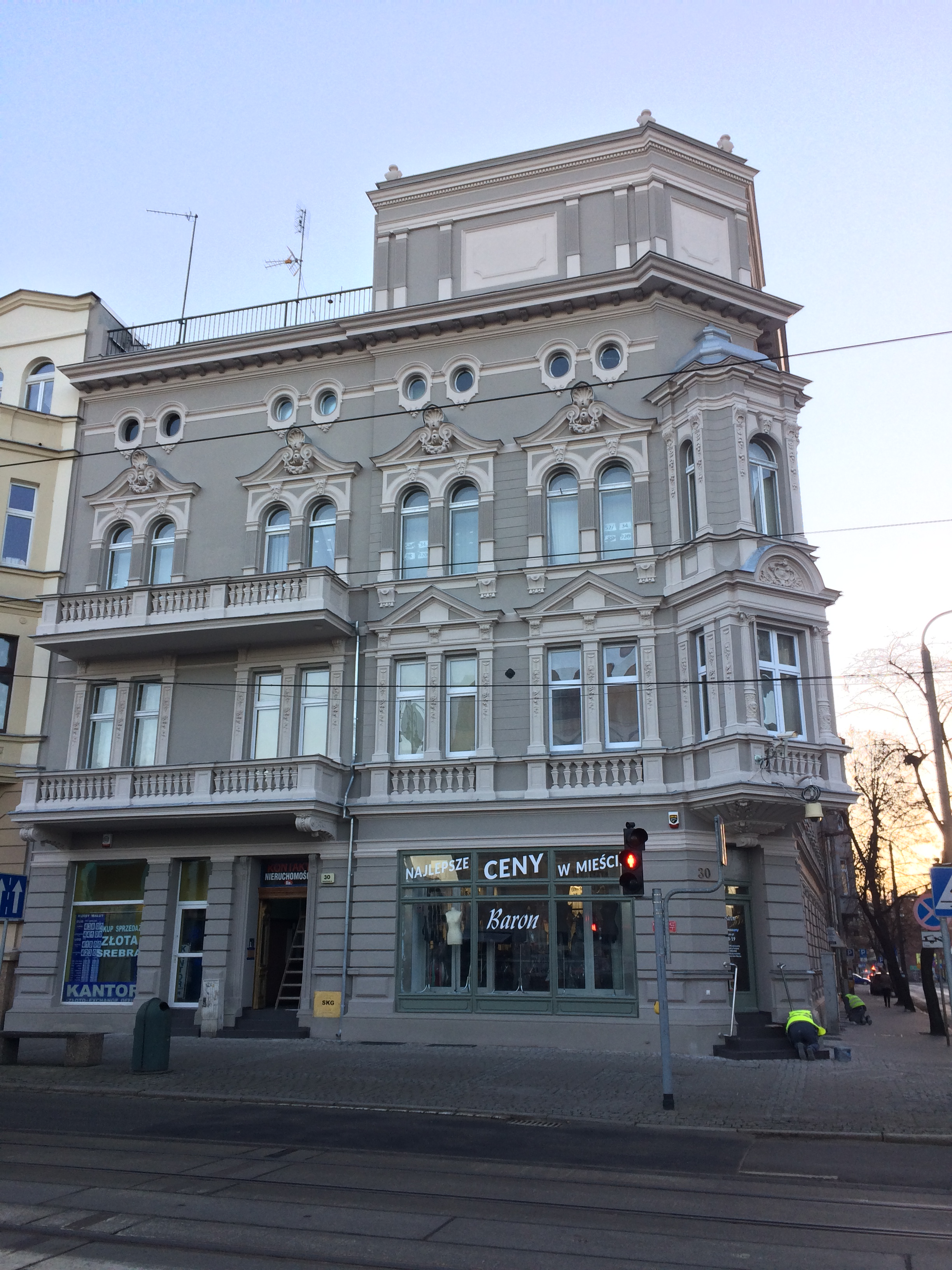
Facade on Gdańska street

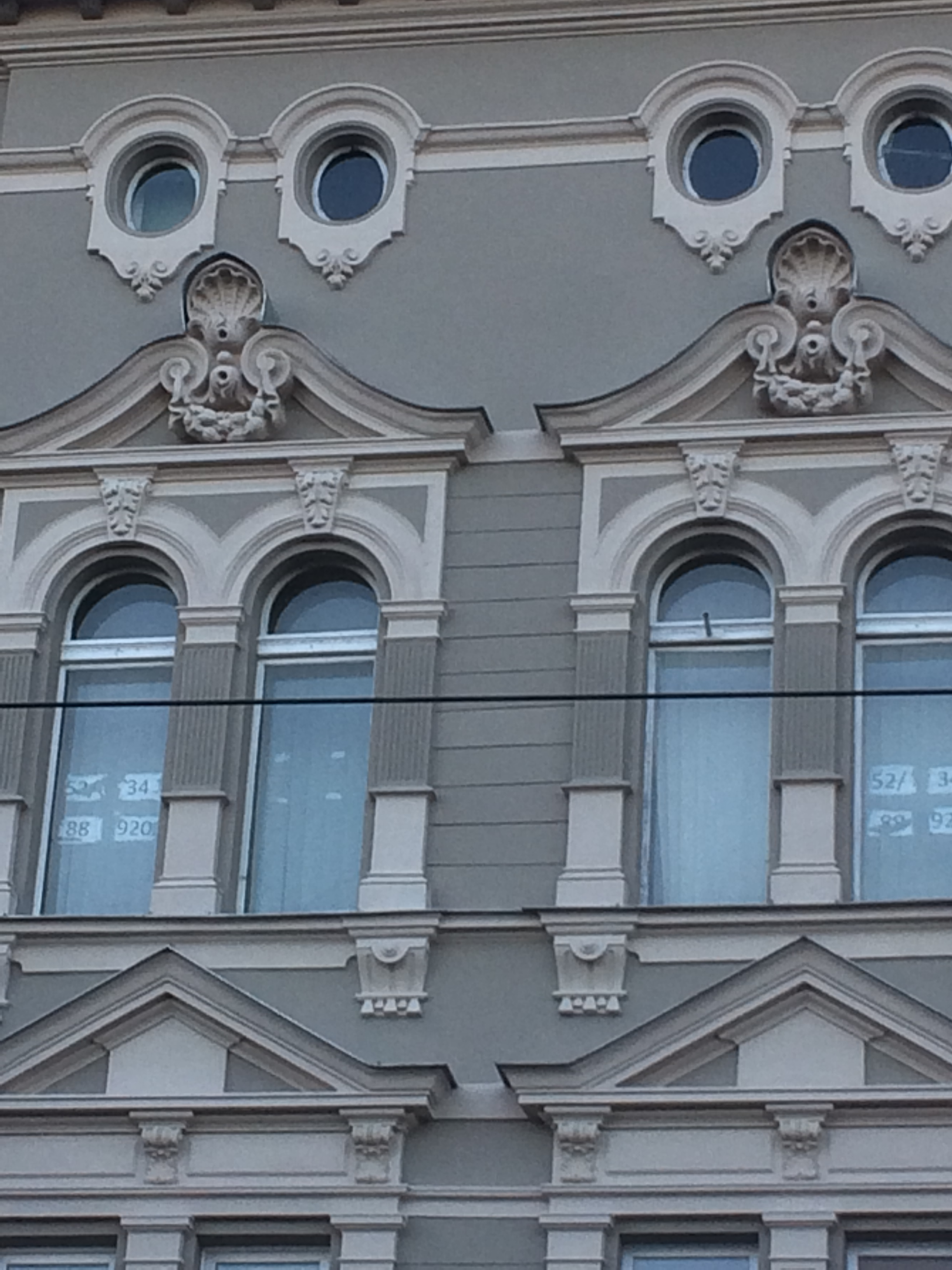
Ornament detail

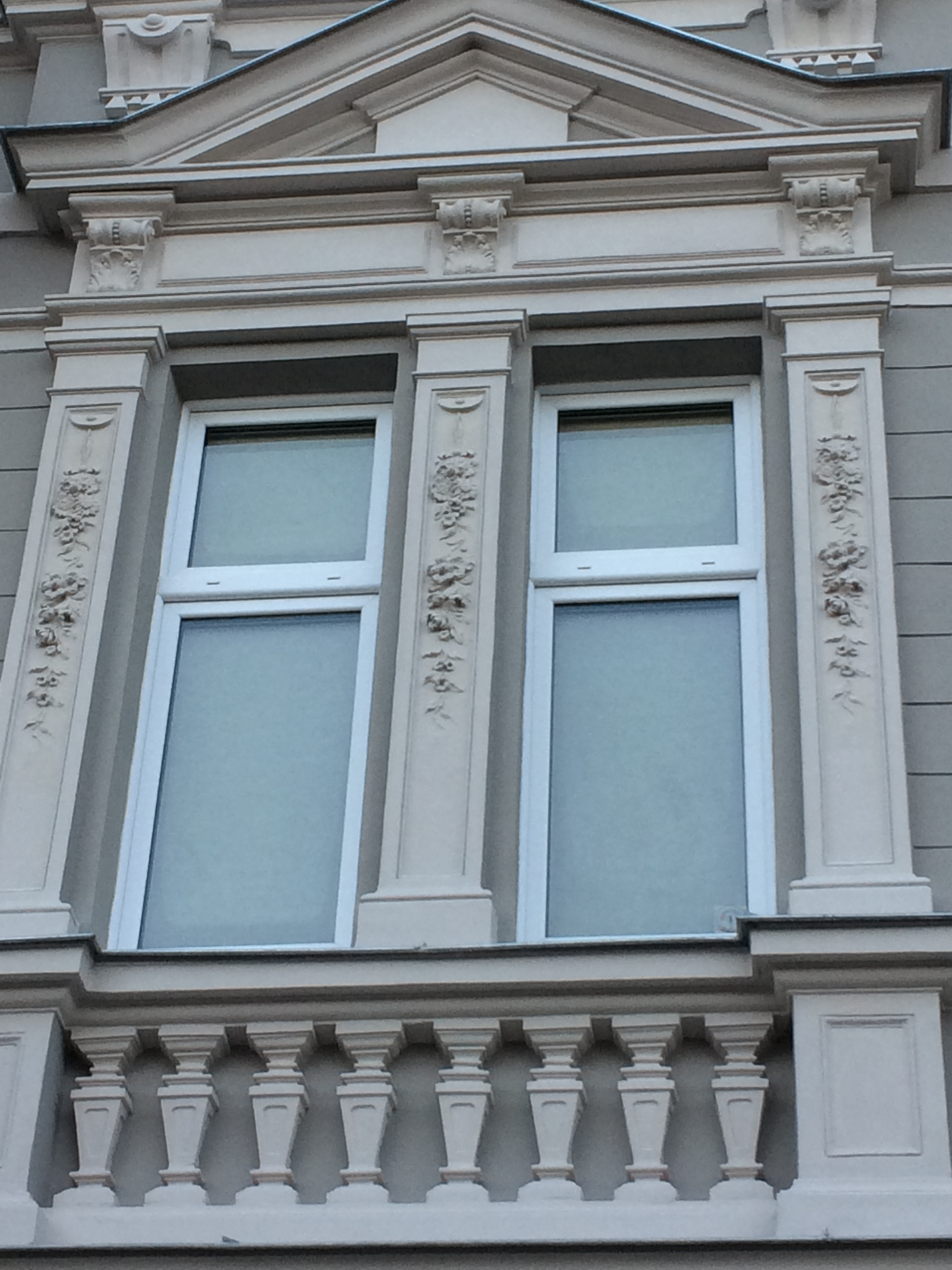
Adorned window

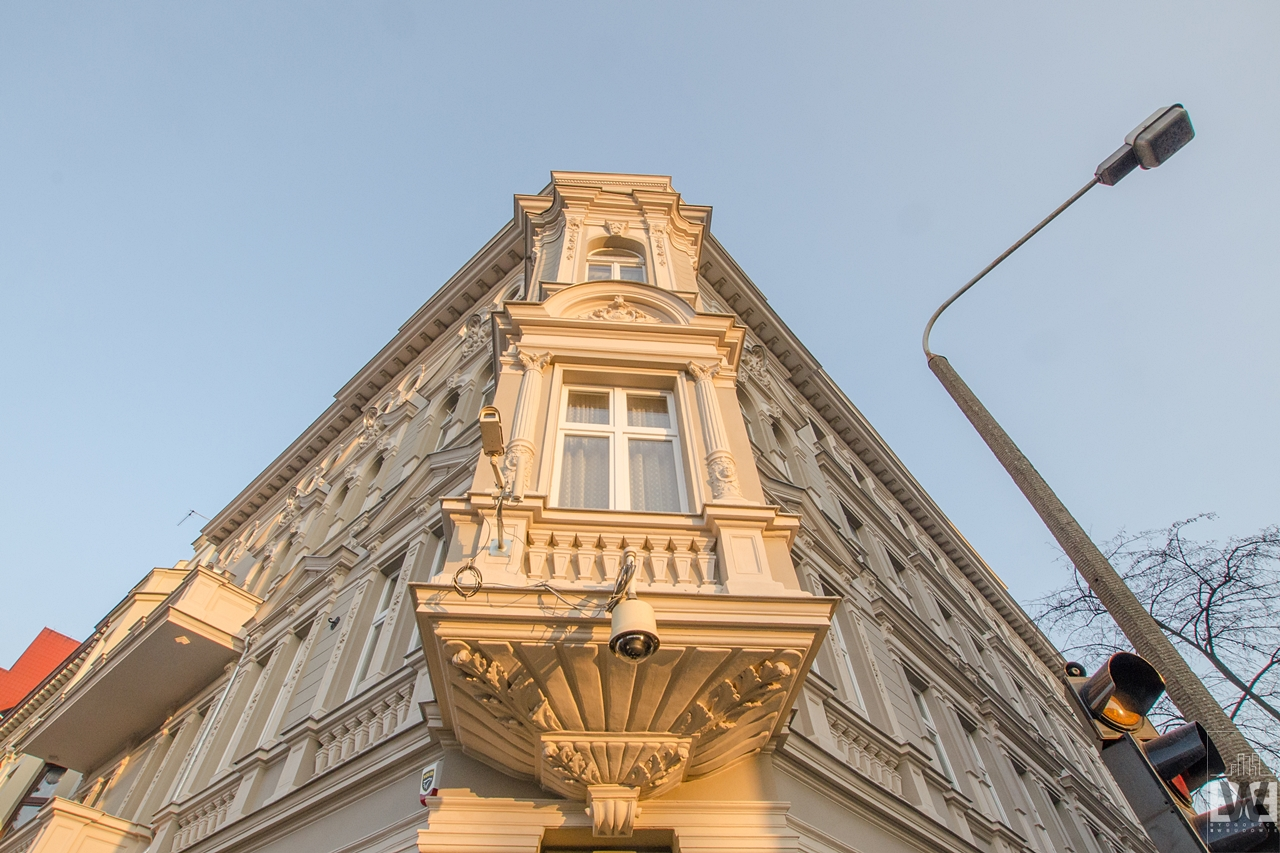
Corner bay window

== See also ==
- Bydgoszcz
- Gdanska Street in Bydgoszcz
- Zygmunt Krasiński Street in Bydgoszcz
- Józef Święcicki

== Bibliography ==
- (in Polish) Bręczewska-Kulesza, Daria. Wpływ architektury i architektów berlińskich na bydgoskie budownictwo mieszkaniowe na przełomie XIX i XX stulecia. Bydgoszcz.
- (in Polish) Bręczewska-Kulesza Daria, Derkowska-Kostkowska Bogna, Wysocka A. (2003). Ulica Gdańska. Przewodnik historyczny. Bydgoszcz: Wojewódzki Ośrodek Kultury w Bydgoszczy. ISBN 9788386970100.
