= Carl Peschel Tenement =

Carl Peschel tenement
- Polish: Kamienica Carla Peschela w Bydgoszczy
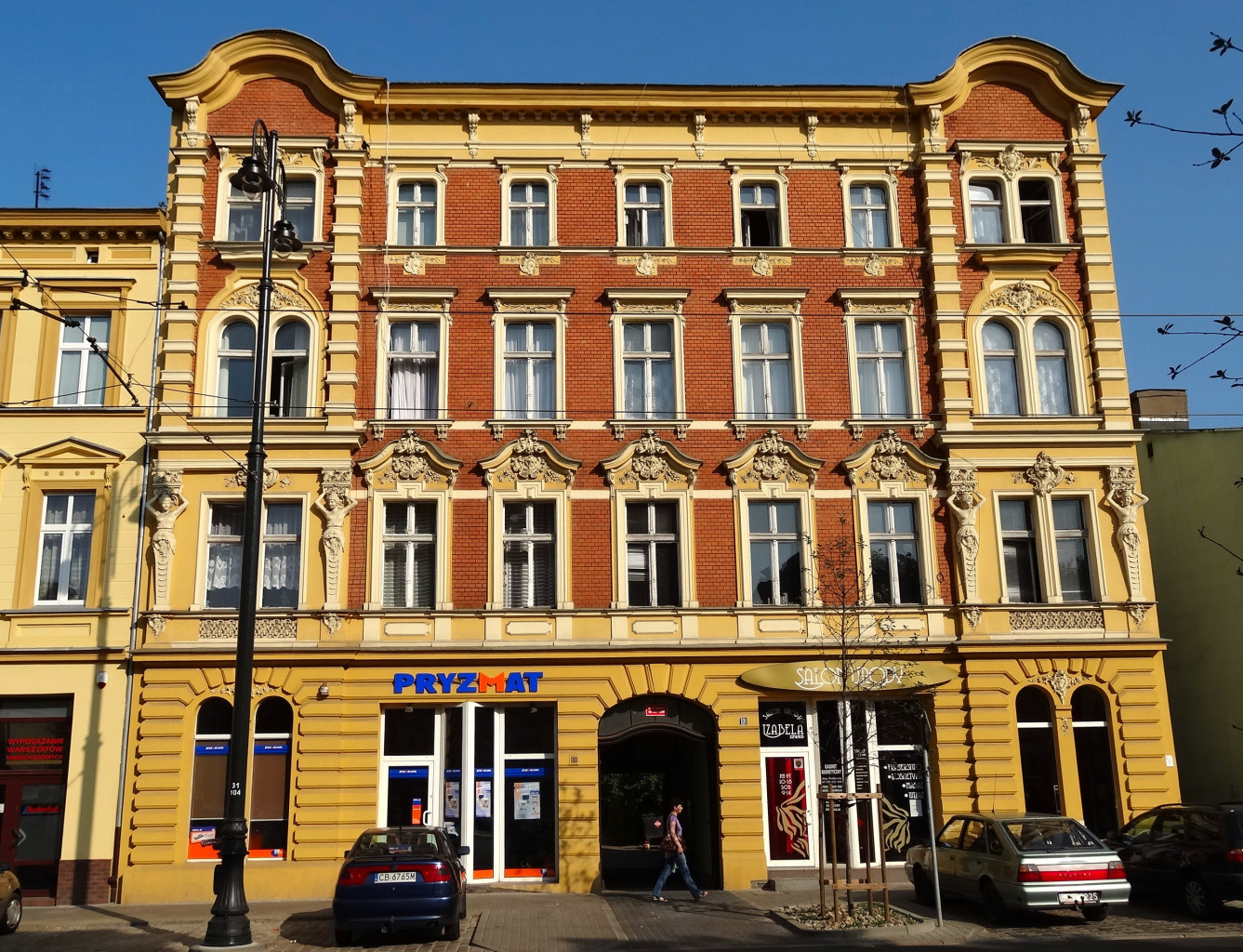
- Tenement from Gdanska Street

General information
- Type: Tenement
- Architectural style: Eclecticism & rokoko
- Classification: Nr.A/11, October 12, 1999
- Location: 101 Gdanska Street, Bydgoszcz, Poland
- Coordinates: 53°8′00″N 18°0′38″E
- Groundbreaking: 1892
- Completed: 1893
- Client: Carl Peschel

Technical details
- Floor count: 4

Design and construction
- Architect(s): Józef Święcicki

The Carl Peschel tenement is a historical habitation building in Bydgoszcz, Poland. It is registered on the Kuyavian-Pomeranian Voivodeship Heritage List.

== Location ==
The building stands on the western side of Gdańska Street, at Nr.101, between Świętojańska and Chocimska Streets, opposite Zamoyskiego street.

It stands close to remarkable tenements in the same street, among others:

- Tenement at 91 Gdańska Street;
- Hugo Hecht tenement at 92-94Gdańska Street;
- Carl Bradtke Tenement at 93 Gdańska Street;
- Tenement at 95 Gdańska Street;
- Stanisław Rolbieski tenement at 96 Gdańska Street;
- Reinhold Zschiesche Tenement in Bydgoszcz at the next crossing.

== History ==
The house was built in 1892-1893, designed by Bydoszcz's architect Józef Święcicki for Carl Peschel, a rentier. At the time, the address was 57 Danziger Straße, Bromberg.

Since its creation, the edifice has been conceived as a renting house (more than 15 inhabitants were registered at this address in 1900) and commercial building.

== Features ==
The building has an eclecticism style facade.

The red brick wall contrasts with the rich, neo-baroque details, the rococo stuccoes -distant reminiscence of northern Mannerism. On the symmetry axis of this two-winged building is placed a gate door with wrought iron decorative elements.

In the same area, Józef Święcicki also realized other edifices, among which:

- Hotel "Pod Orlem" at 14 Gdańska Street;
- Oskar Ewald Tenement at 30 Gdańska Street;
- Józef Święcicki tenement at 63 Gdańska Street;
- Tenement at 86 Gdańska Street;
- Villa Hugo Hecht at 88-90 Gdańska Street;
- Hugo Hecht tenement at 92-94 Gdańska Street
- Tenement at 1 Plac Wolności.

The building has been put on the Kuyavian-Pomeranian Voivodeship Heritage List Nr.601323 Reg.A/11, on October 12, 1999

== Gallery ==
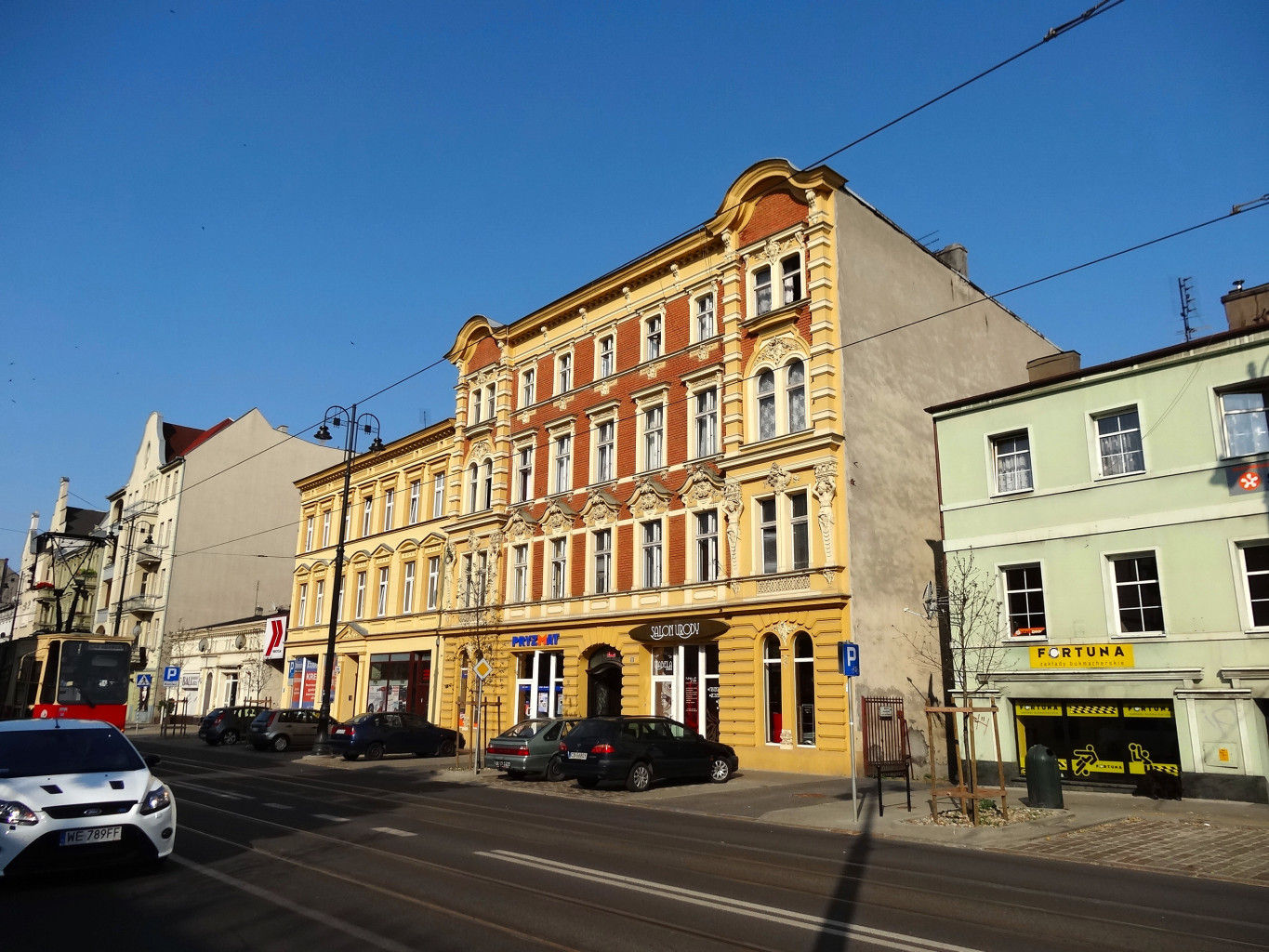
View from the opposite side of Gdanska street

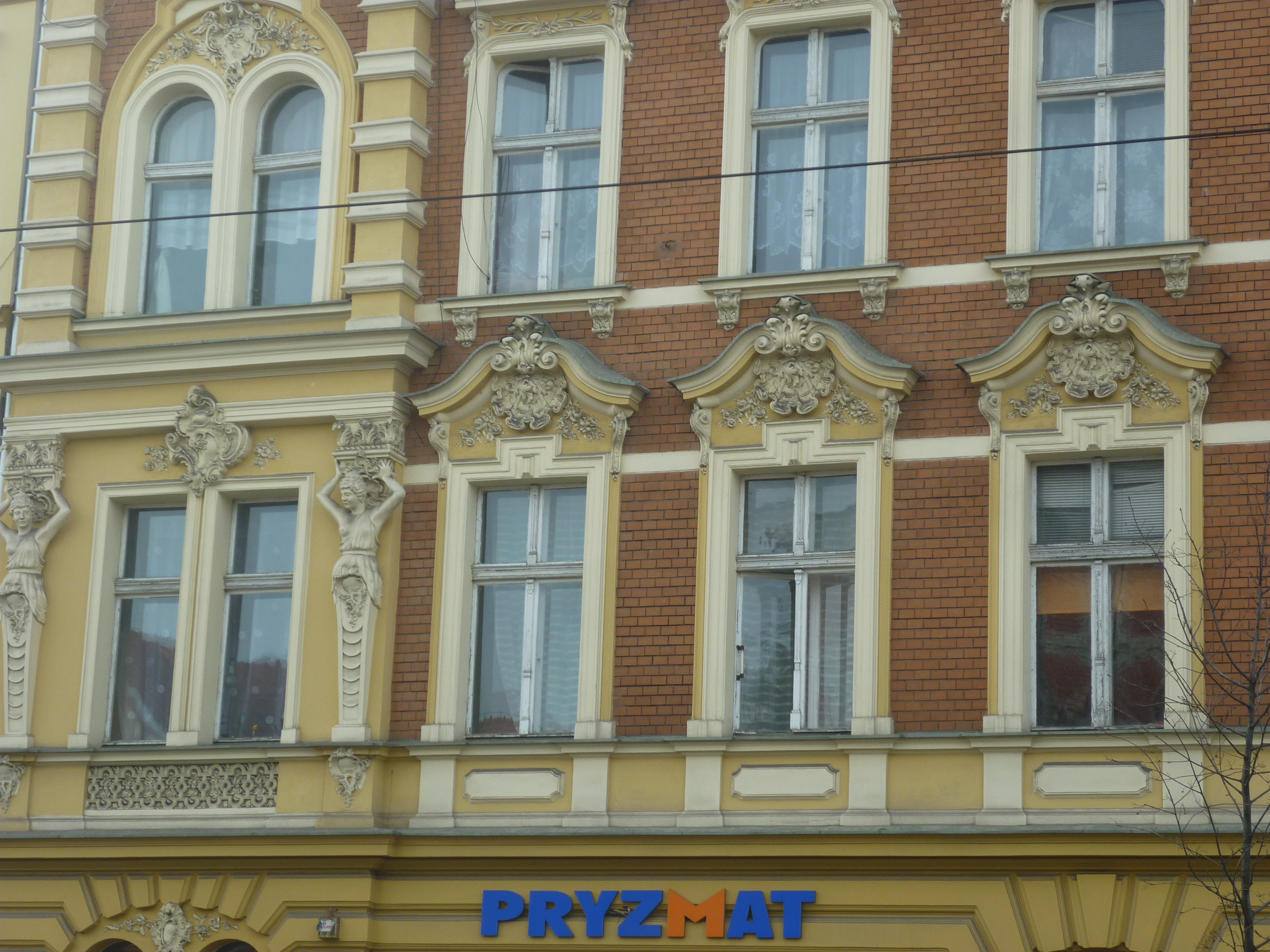
Detail of the facade

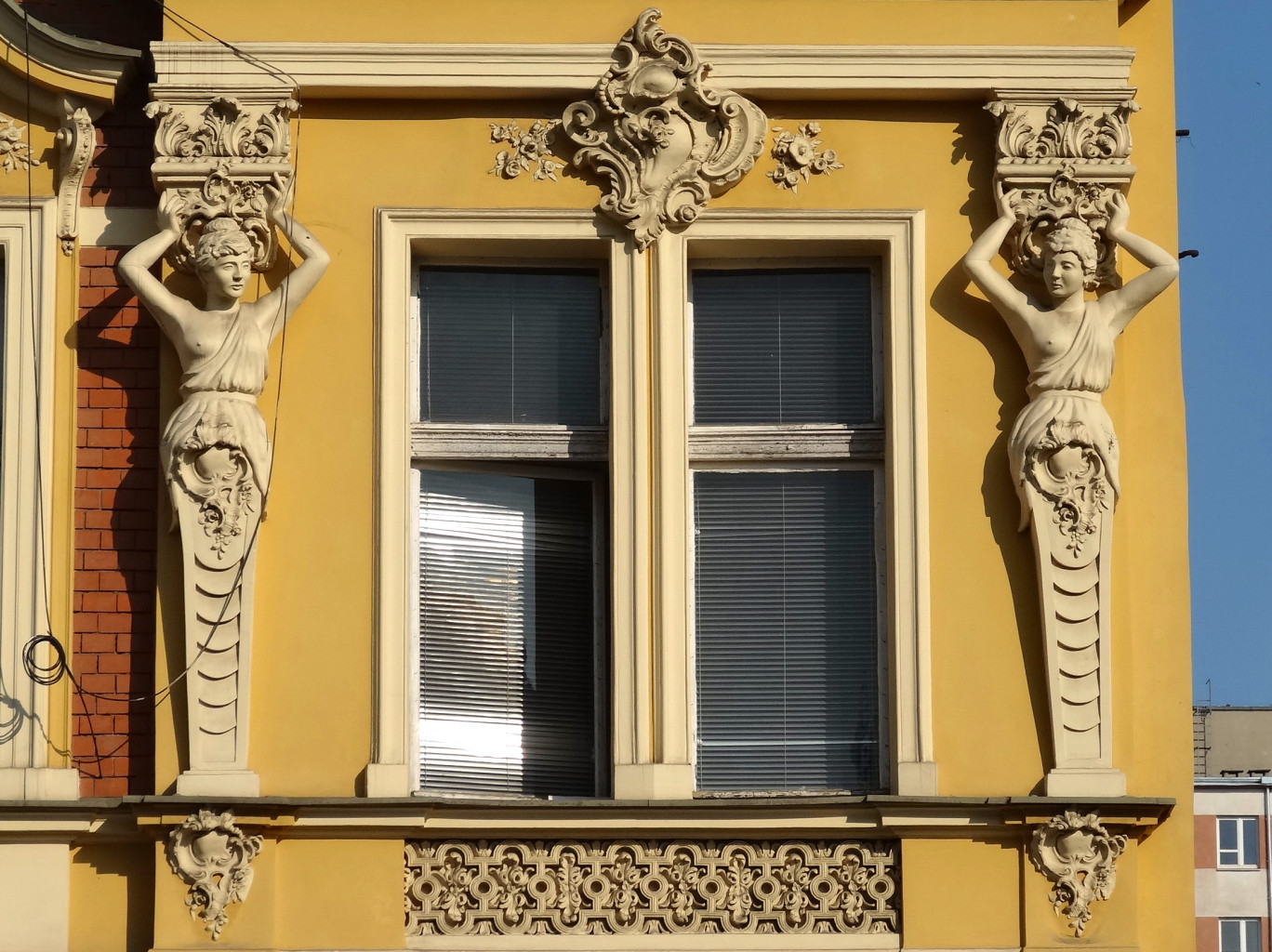
Caryatides

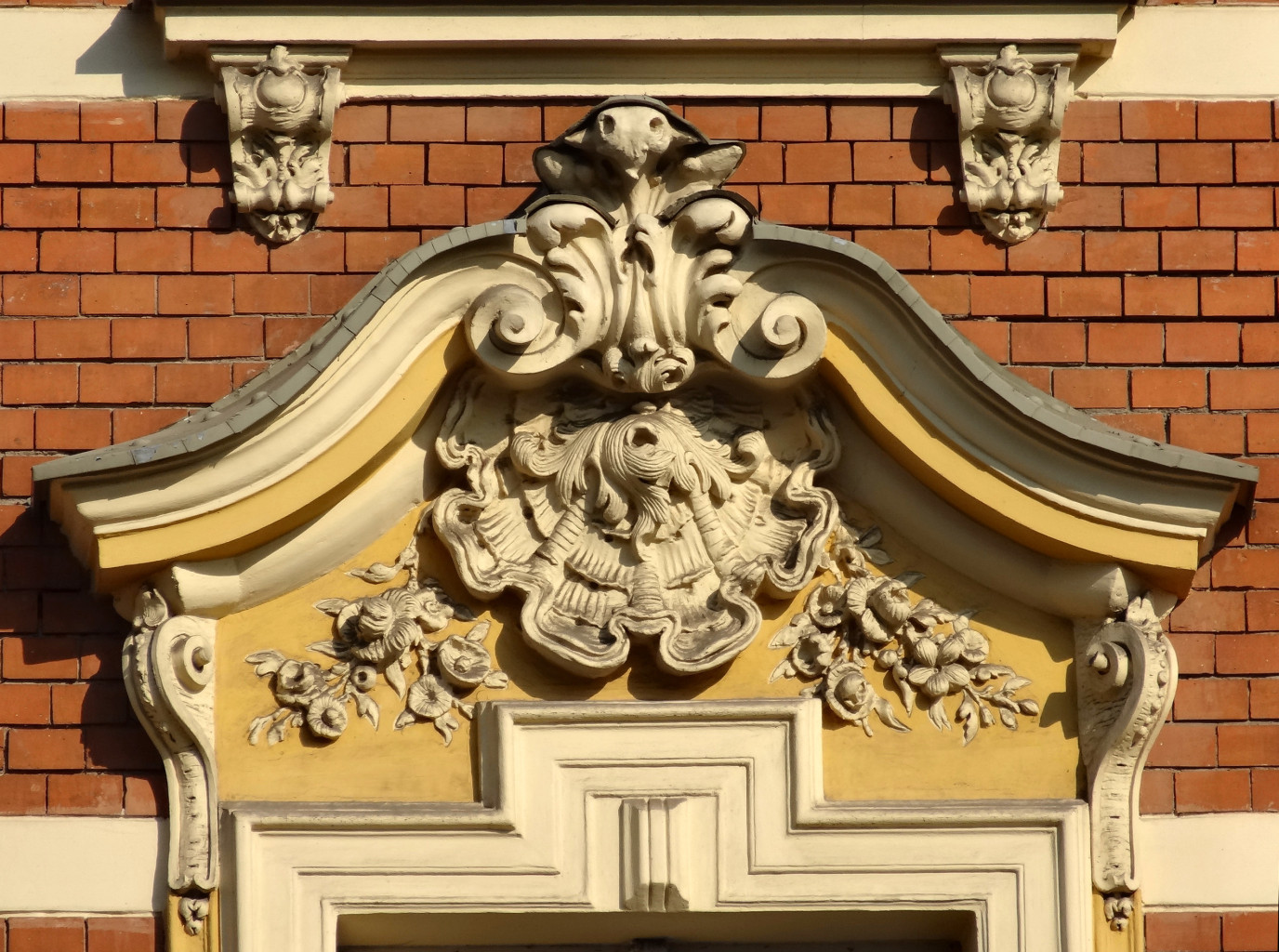
Pediment detail

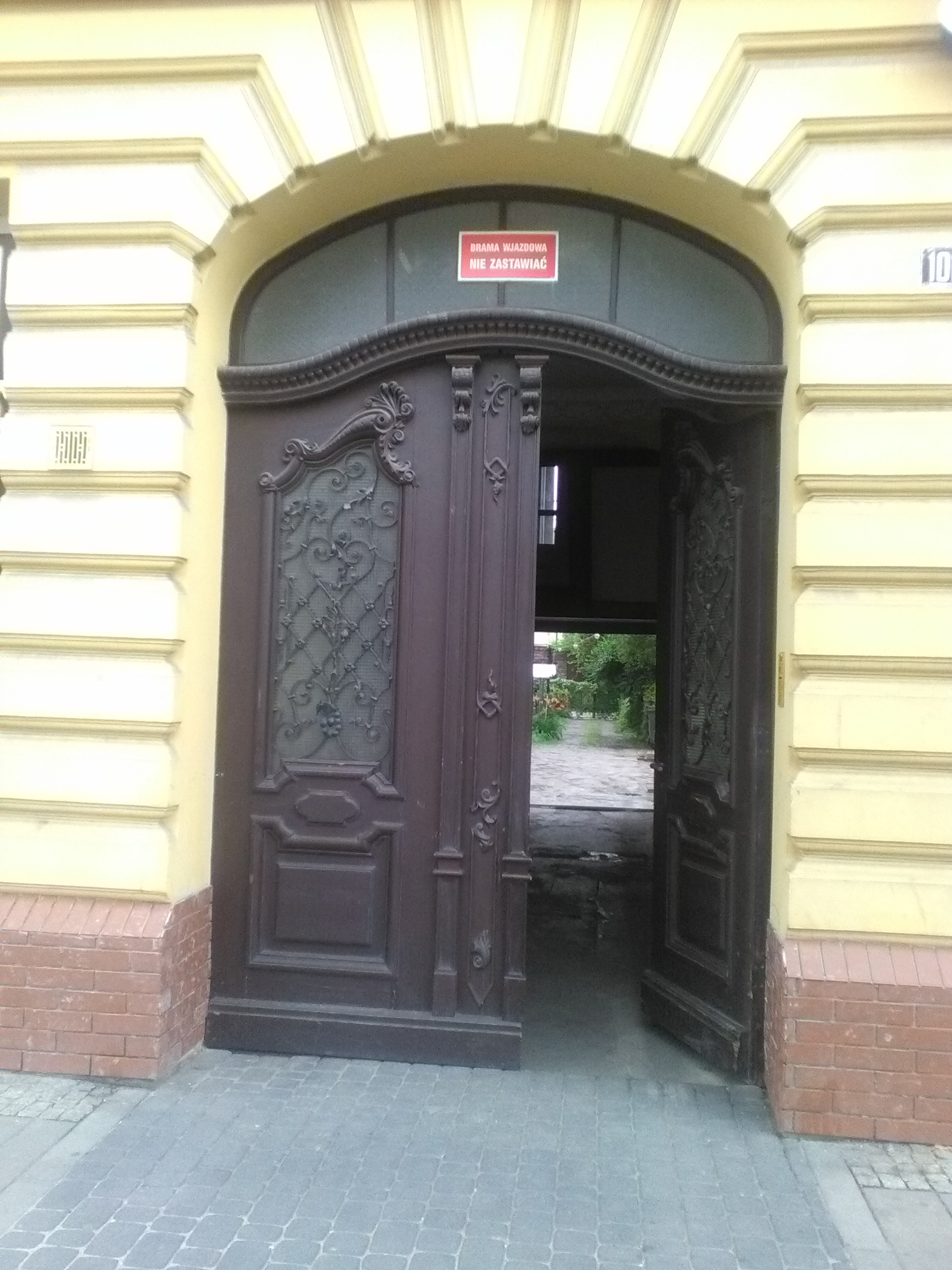
Door detail

== See also ==
- Bydgoszcz
- Gdanska Street in Bydgoszcz
- Józef Święcicki
- (in Polish) Downtown district in Bydgoszcz

== Bibliography ==
- Bręczewska-Kulesza Daria, Derkowska-Kostkowska Bogna, Wysocka A. (2003). Ulica Gdańska. Przewodnik historyczny (in Polish). Bydgoszcz: Wojewódzki Ośrodek Kultury w Bydgoszczy. ISBN 8386970103.
