= Reinhold Zschiesche Tenement =

Historic building in Bydgoszcz, Poland

- Polish: Kamienica Reinholda Zschiesche w Bydgoszczy
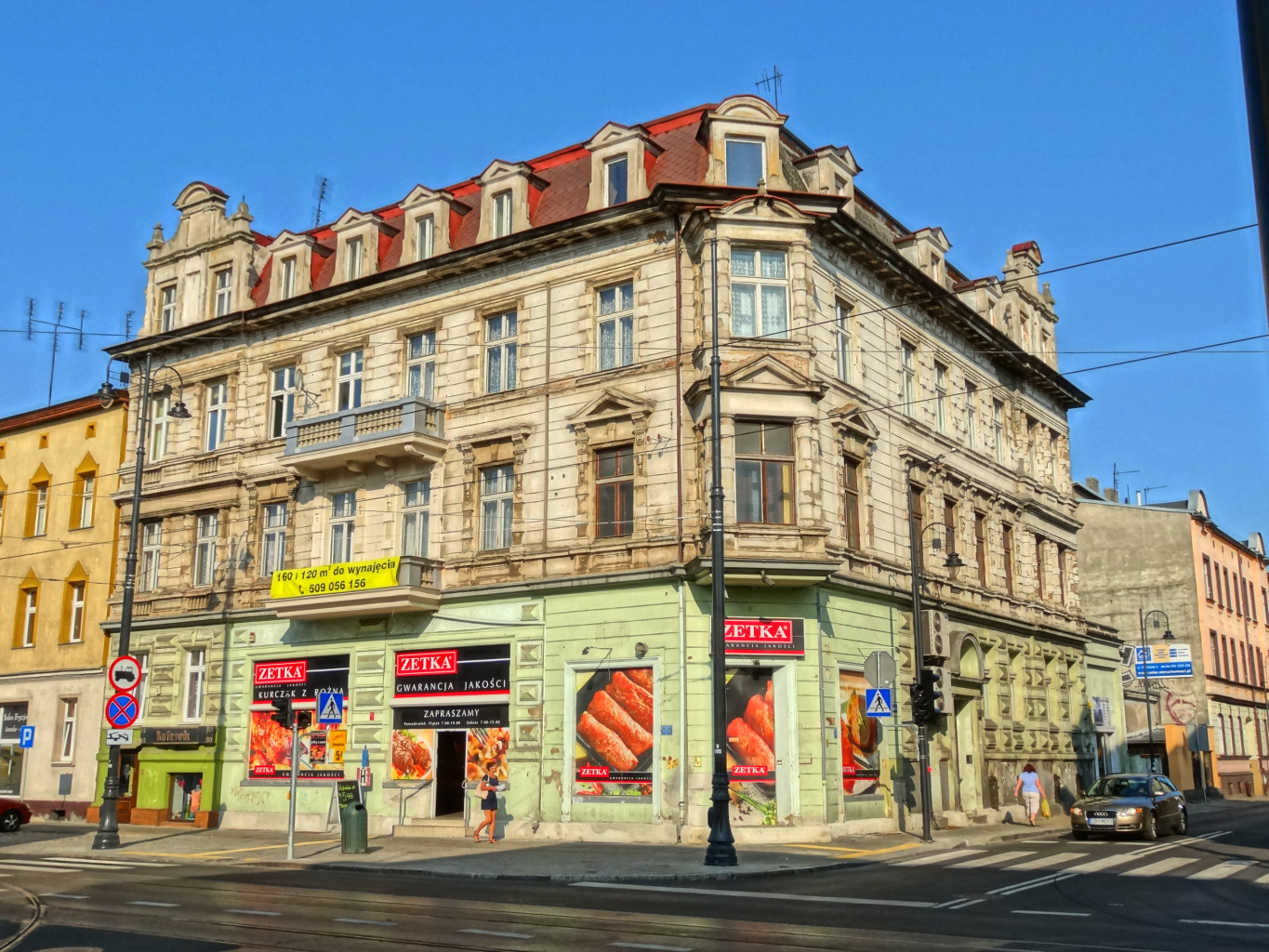
- Tenement from Gdańska Street

General information
- Type: Tenement
- Architectural style: Eclecticism
- Location: 1 Chocimska St., at the intersection with Gdańska Street, Bydgoszcz, Poland
- Coordinates: 53°8′04″N 18°0′42″E
- Groundbreaking: 1885
- Completed: 1886
- Client: Reinhold Zschiesche

Technical details
- Floor count: 4

Design and construction
- Architect(s): Józef Święcicki

The Reinhold Zschiesche Tenement is a historical habitation building located at 1 Chocimska street, at the intersection with Gdańska Street in Bydgoszcz, Poland.

== Location ==
The building stands on the western side of Gdańska street, at the crossing with Chocimska Street.

It stands close to remarkable tenements in the same street, among others:

- Tenement at 91 Gdańska street;
- Hugo Hecht tenement at 92-94 Gdańska street;
- Carl Bradtke Tenement at 93 Gdańska street;
- Tenement at 95 Gdańska street;
- Stanisław Rolbieski tenement at 96 Gdańska street;
- Carl Peschel tenement at 101 Gdańska street.

== History ==
The house was built between 1885 and 1886 for the dealer and restaurateur Reinhold Zschiesche, according to a project by Józef Święcicki.

In 1908, the ground floor housed a restaurant and pub, owned by Reinhold Zschiesche, with its entrance located at the corner of the building.

In the 1920s, in the backyard, Antoni Zurawski ran a trading company.

== Architecture ==
Building's architecture has eclecticicism style, with plastic details, taken from the repertoire of Neo-Renaissance and Mannerism decoration forms. The corner of the house is underlined by a two-storey bay window.

In the same area, Józef Święcicki also realized other edifices:

- Hotel "Pod Orlem" at 14 Gdańska Street;
- Oskar Ewald Tenement at 30 Gdańska Street;
- Józef Święcicki tenement at 63 Gdańska Street;
- Tenement at 86 Gdańska Street;
- Villa Hugo Hecht at 88-90 Gdańska Street;
- Hugo Hecht tenement at 92-94 Gdańska Street;
- Tenement at 1 Plac Wolności.

== Gallery ==
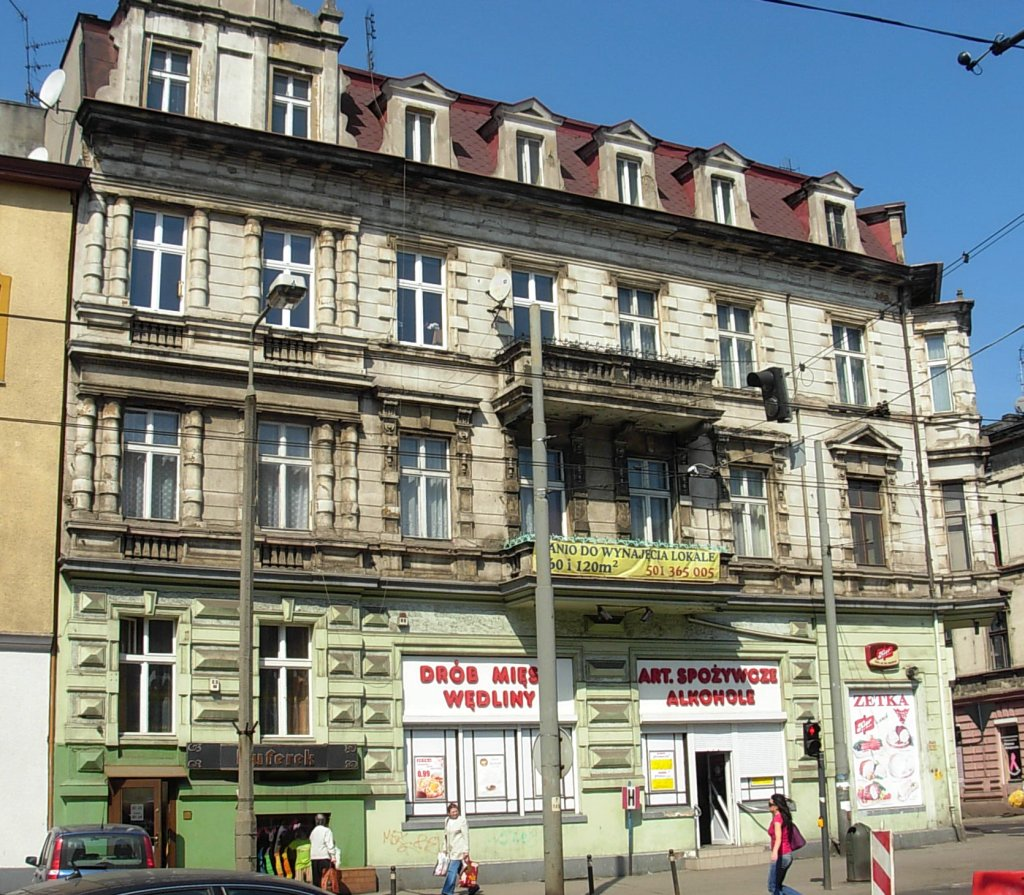
Frontage onto Gdańska Street

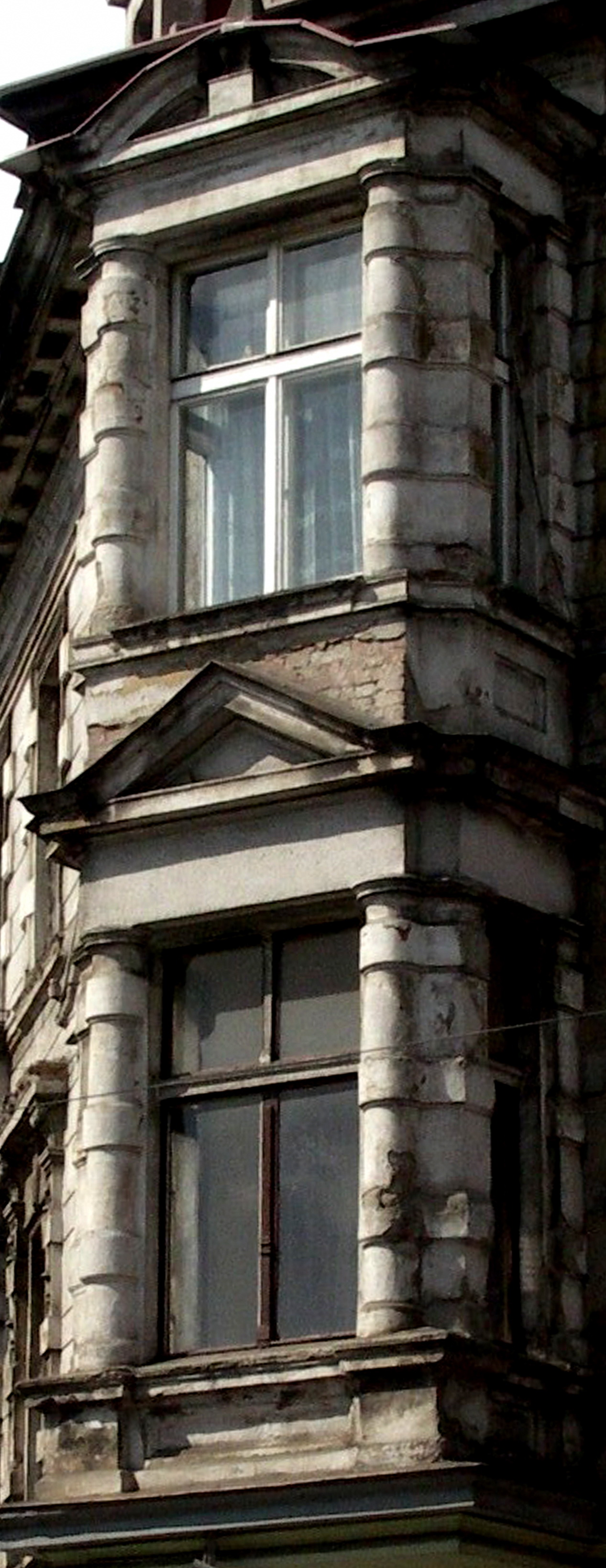
Detail of the bay window

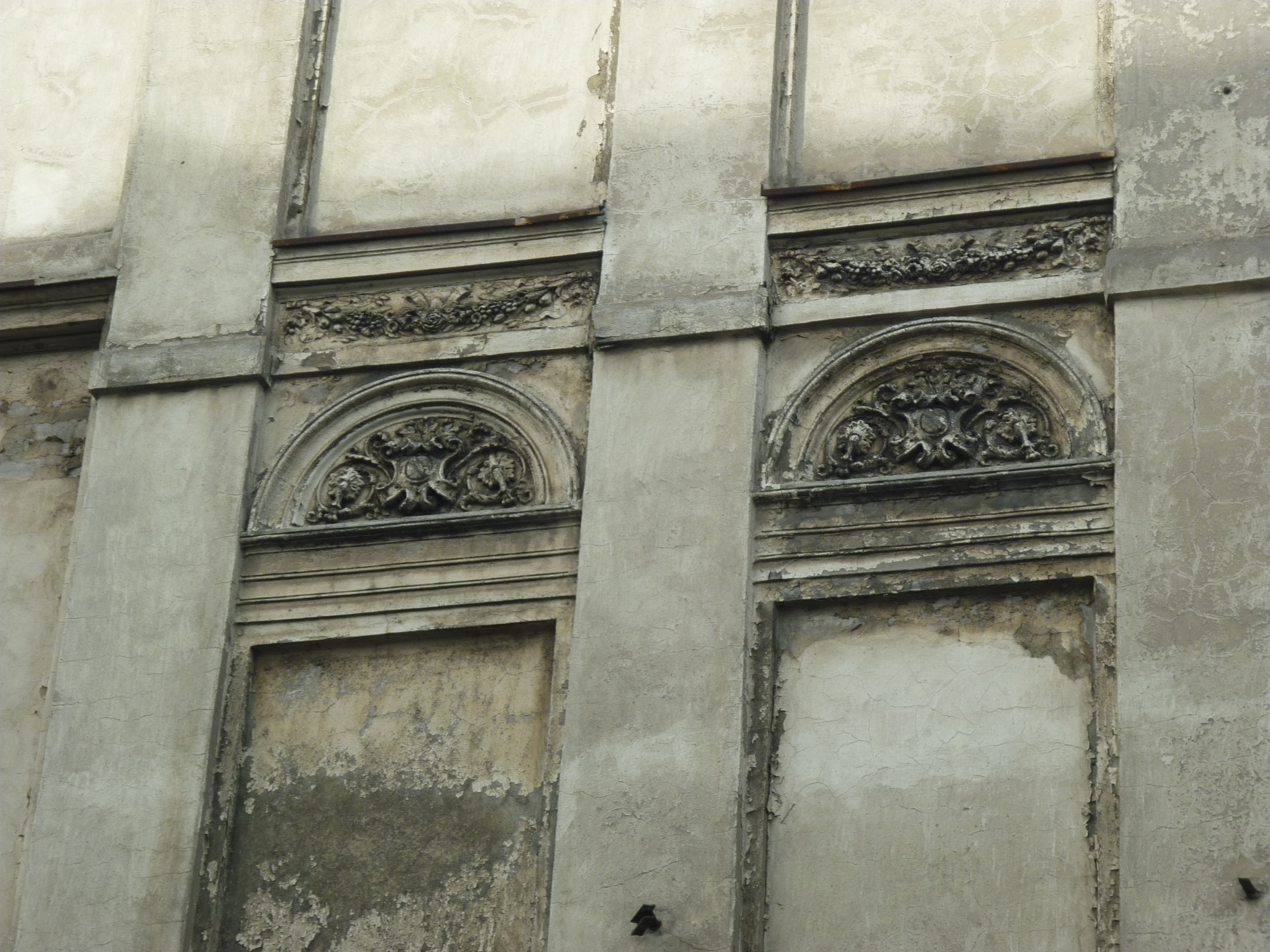
Detail of a relief

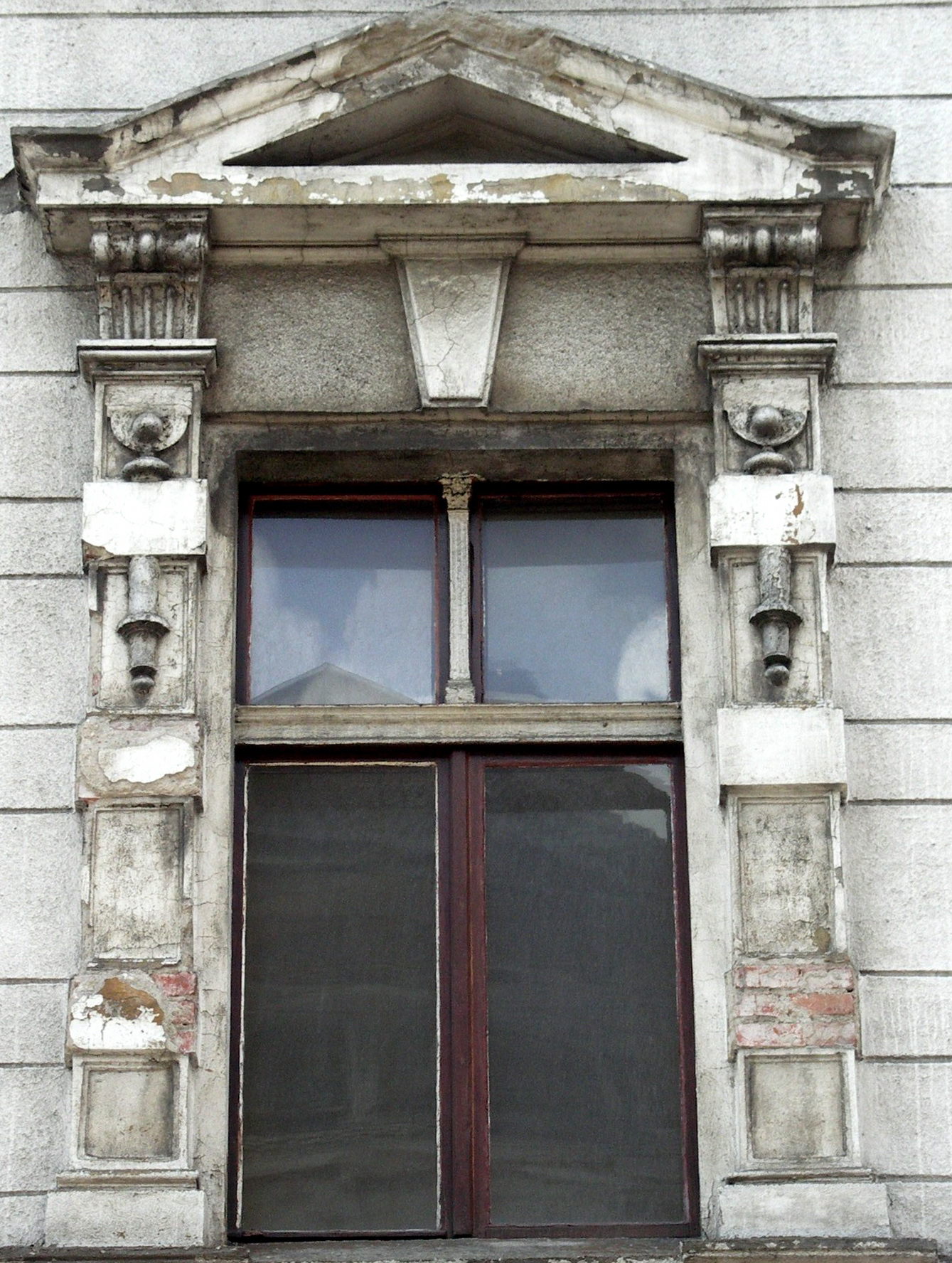
Detail of the adorned window

== See also ==
- Bydgoszcz
- Gdanska Street in Bydgoszcz
- Józef Święcicki
- (in Polish) Downtown district in Bydgoszcz

== Bibliography ==
- Bręczewska-Kulesza Daria, Derkowska-Kostkowska Bogna, Wysocka A. (2003). Ulica Gdańska. Przewodnik historyczny (in Polish). Bydgoszcz: Wojewódzki Ośrodek Kultury w Bydgoszczy. ISBN 8386970103.
