= Carl Bradtke Tenement =

Carl Bradtke tenement
- Polish: Kamienica Carla Bradtke w Bydgoszczy
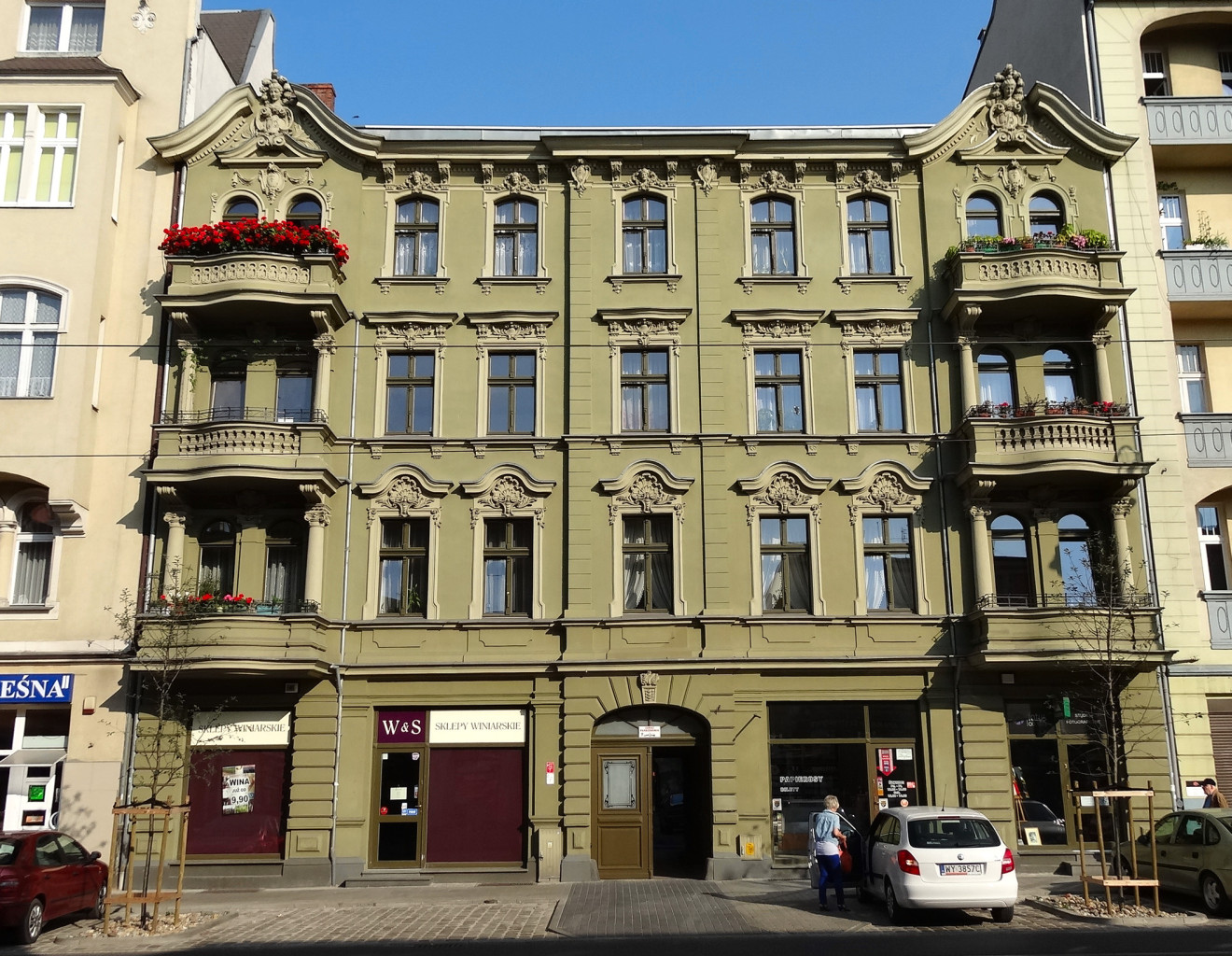
- View from Gdanska Street
- Interactive map of the Carl Bradtke tenement area

General information
- Type: Tenement
- Architectural style: German Historicism, rokoko elements
- Classification: Nr.A/1126/1-4, June 5, 1993
- Location: Poland, 93 Gdanska Street, Bydgoszcz, Poland
- Coordinates: 53°7′58″N 18°0′37″E
- Construction started: 1895
- Completed: 1896
- Client: Carl Bradtke

Technical details
- Floor count: 4

Design and construction
- Architect: Józef Święcicki

The Carl Bradtke Tenement is a historical habitation building located at 93 Gdańska Street, in Bydgoszcz, Poland It is registered on the Kuyavian-Pomeranian Voivodeship Heritage list.

== Location ==
The building stands on the eastern side of Gdańska Street between Świętojańska street and Chocimska street.

It stands close to remarkable tenements in the same street:

- Villa Carl Grosse at 84;
- Otto Riedl Tenement at 85;
- Villa Hugo Hecht at 88/90;
- Tenement at 91 Gdanska street;
- Hugo Hecht tenement at 92/94.

== History ==
The house was built in 1895-1896, on a design by architect Joseph Święcicki for a master stonecutter Carl Bradtke. Carl Bradtke worked also with Fritz Weidner for the erection of a nearby building at Nr.91.

The house, from the beginning, had been thought as a rental building as well as a trading one with two wings merging at the rear. The initials of the first owner ("CB") appear in a cartouche of an upper pediment.

The initial address of the house was 53 Danzigerstrasse.

At the beginning of the 20th century, the tenement housed a bicycles dealer, company Patria, run by Erich Krahn, .

In the 1920s a patisserie (Polish: Piekarnia) owned by Emil Kobielski had been operating in the building.

== Features ==
The building has a richly decorated facade with two small side gables, in which stands a gargoyle on a background of ostrich feathers. The architect created a functional complex of buildings centered around a rectangular courtyard enclosed at the back. A hallway allows to get the residential house located at the back of the garden.

The front building follows the Historicism style with references to Neo-Baroque and Rococo. In the same area, Józef Święcicki also realized other edifices:

- Hotel "Pod Orlem" at 14 Gdańska street;
- Oskar Ewald Tenement at 30 Gdańska street;
- Józef Święcicki tenement at 63 Gdańska street;
- Tenement at 86 Gdańska street;
- Hugo Hecht tenement at Gdańska street Nr.92/94;
- Tenement at 1 Plac Wolności.

The building has been put on the Kuyavian-Pomeranian Voivodeship Heritage List Nr.601318 Reg.A/1126/1-4, on June 5, 1993.

== Gallery ==
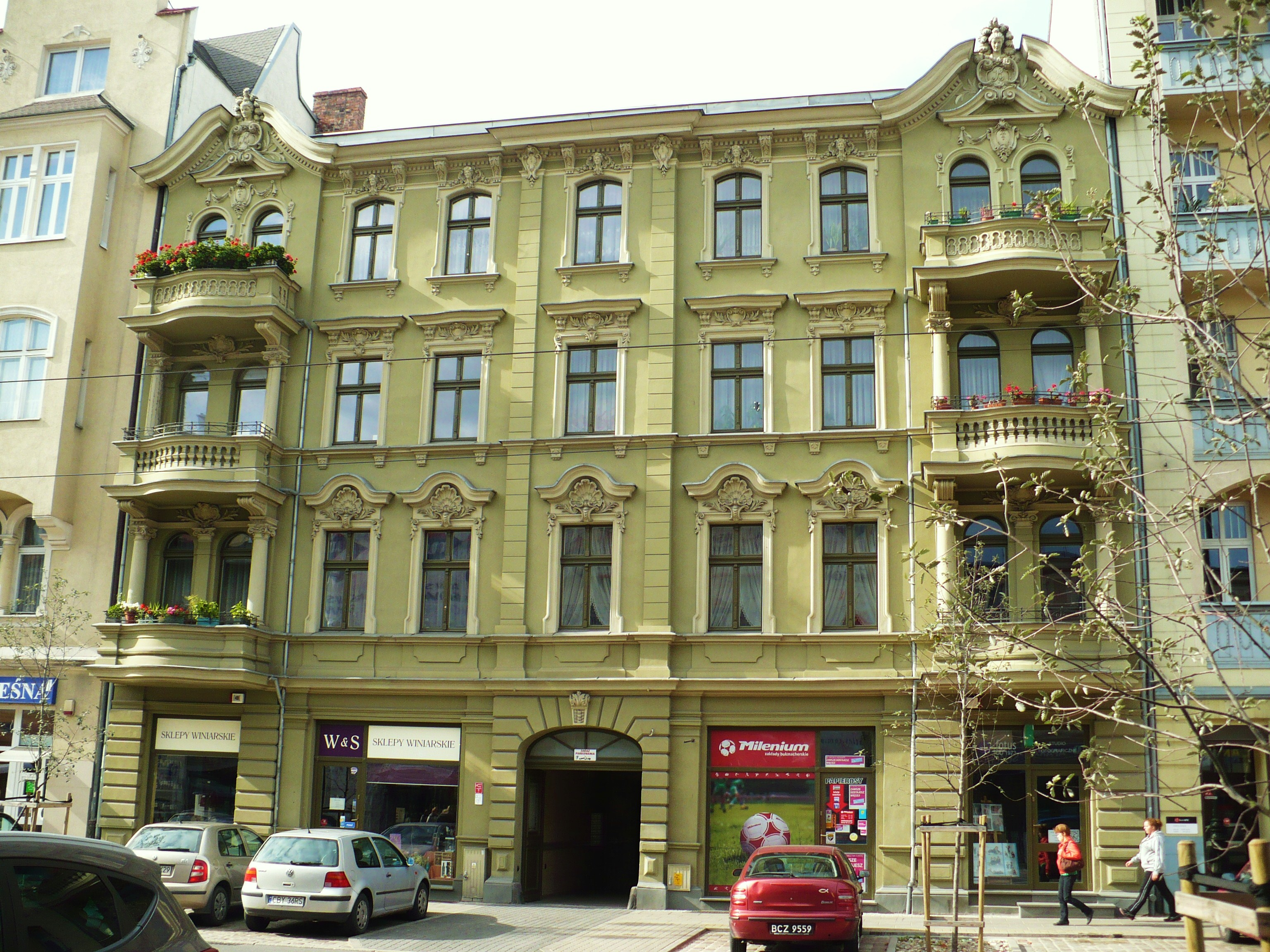
Frontage onto Gdanska Street

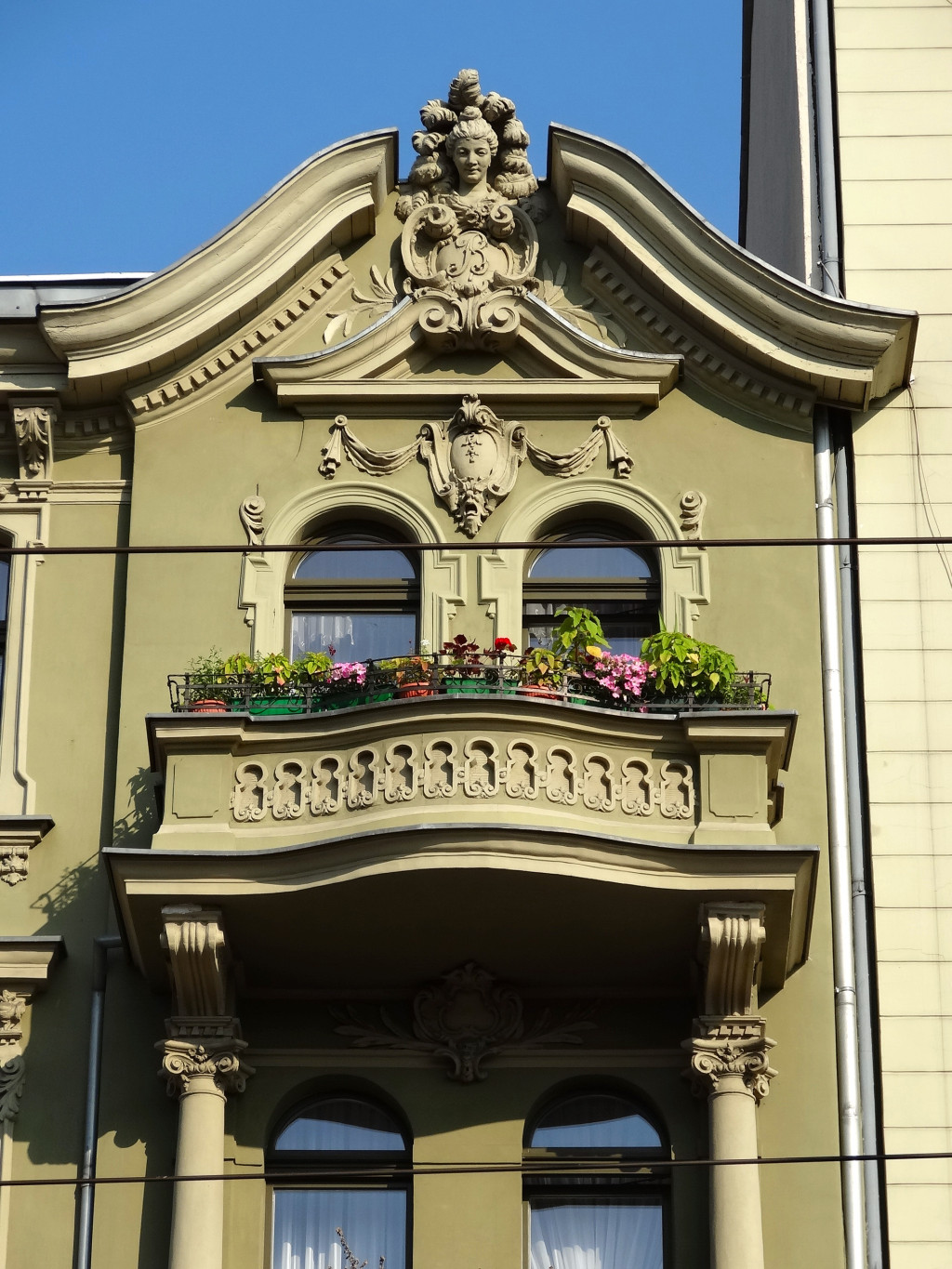
Balcony and gable

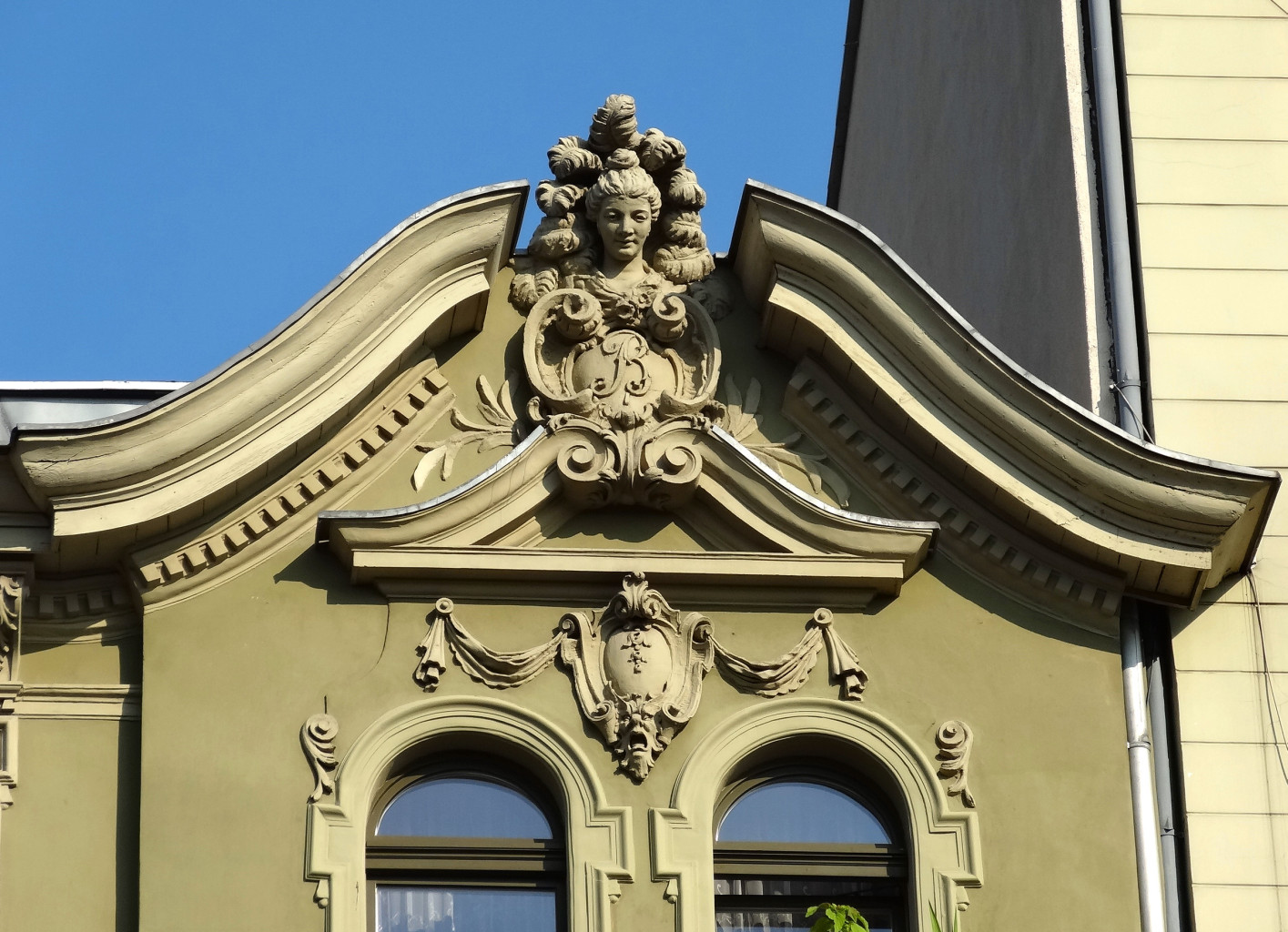
Cartouche with Carl Bradtke initials

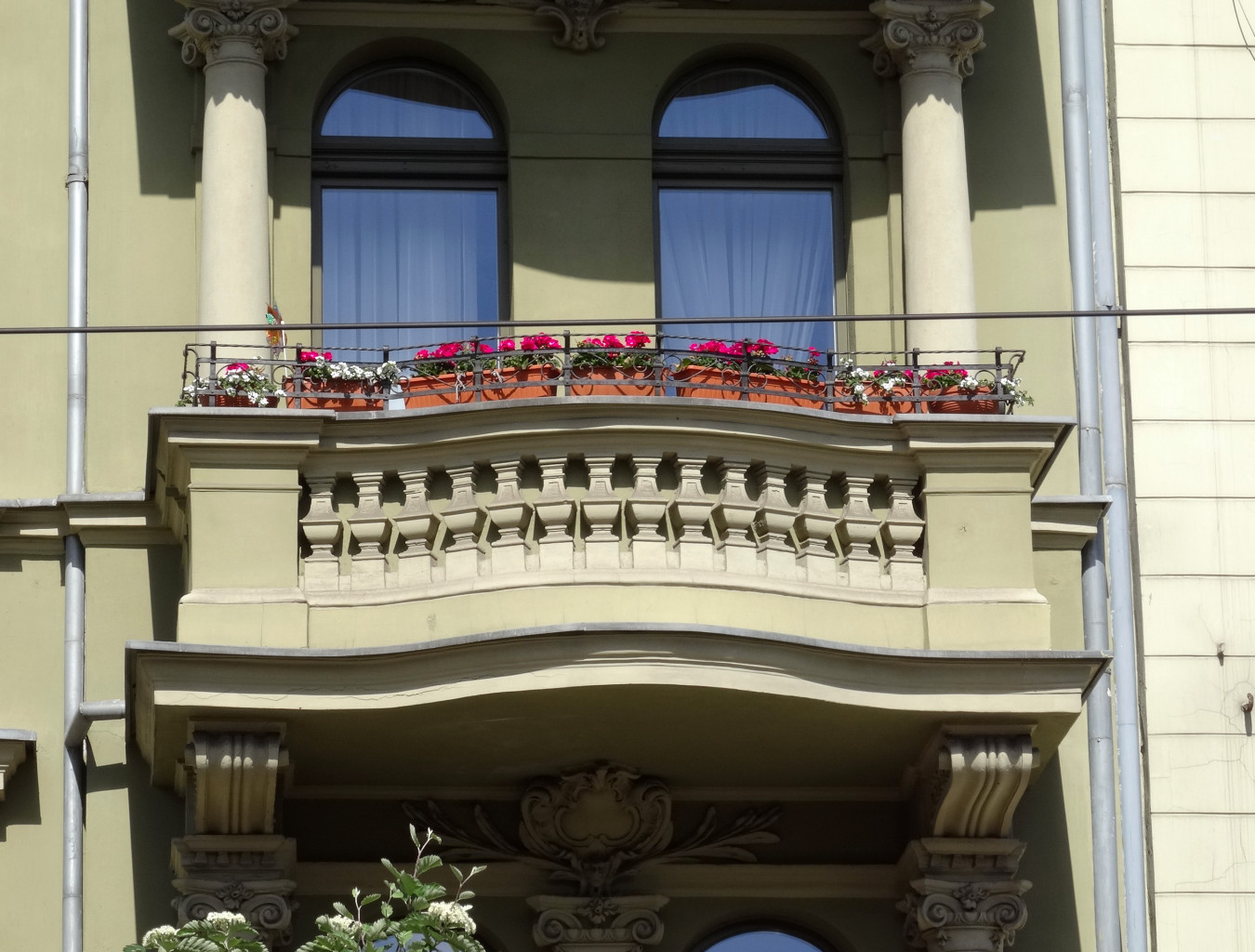
Detail of 1st floor balcony

== See also ==
- Bydgoszcz
- Gdanska Street in Bydgoszcz
- Józef Święcicki
- Fritz Weidner

== Bibliography ==
- Bręczewska-Kulesza Daria, Derkowska-Kostkowska Bogna, Wysocka A. (2003). Ulica Gdańska. Przewodnik historyczny (in Polish). Bydgoszcz: Wojewódzki Ośrodek Kultury w Bydgoszczy. ISBN 8386970103.
