= Stanisław Rolbieski Tenement =

Stanisław Rolbieski tenement
- Polish: Kamienica Stanisława Rolbieskiego w Bydgoszczy
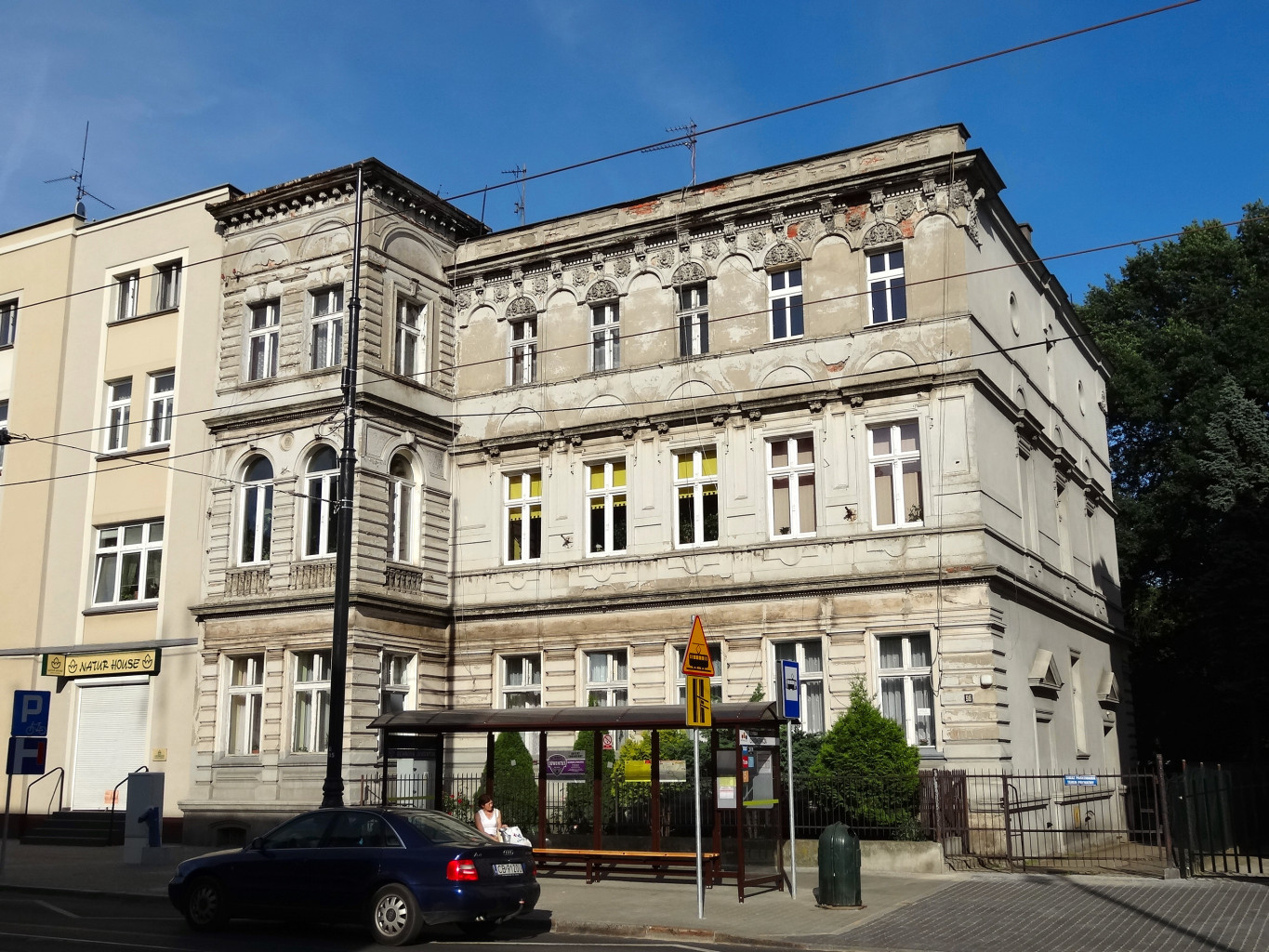
- Tenement from Gdańska Street

General information
- Type: Tenement
- Architectural style: Eclecticism & French Neo-Renaissance
- Location: 96 Gdańska Street, Bydgoszcz, Poland
- Coordinates: 53°8′03″N 18°0′43″E
- Groundbreaking: 1891
- Completed: 1892
- Client: Hugo Hecht

Technical details
- Floor count: 3

Design and construction
- Architect(s): Józef Święcicki

The Stanisław Rolbieski tenement is a historical habitation building located at 96 Gdańska Street, in Bydgoszcz.

== Location ==
The building stands on the eastern side of Gdańska Street between Zamoyskiego street and Chodkiewicz street.

It stands close to remarkable tenements in the same street:

- Villa Carl Grosse at 84;
- Otto Riedl Tenement at 85;
- Villa Hugo Hecht at 88/90;
- Tenement at 91 Gdańska street.

== History ==
The house was built in 1891–1892, commissioned by Hugo Felix Franz Hecht, a timber merchant and dealer, and realized by Józef Święcicki. At the time, the address was 120 Danziger Straße.

It was the last part of a series of six close stylish buildings ordered by Hugo Hecht in Gdańska Street and realized by Józef Święcicki, together with buildings located at 88/90 and 92/94.

During interwar period, the building belonged to the engineer Stanisław Rolbieski, manager of Karbid Wielkopolski SA. He was an entrepreneur, activist, and town councilor of the city, founder of the factory Kabel Polski Sp zoo in Bydgoszcz

During the Nazi occupation the edifice housed the German Labour Front.

== Architecture ==
The building has the homogeneous style of the other habitation houses commissioned by Hugo Hecht (Nr.88/90 & 92/94), with a facade decoration referring to the French Neo-Renaissance forms. The symmetry axis running between each buildings is still visible in the shape of a massive roof topped bay window.

In the same area, Józef Święcicki also realized other edifices:

- Hotel "Pod Orlem" at 14 Gdańska street;
- Oskar Ewald Tenement at 30 Gdańska street;
- Józef Święcicki tenement at 63 Gdańska street;
- Tenement at 86 Gdańska street;
- Villa Hugo Hecht at 88-90 Gdańska street;
- Hugo Hecht tenement at 92-94 Gdańska street;
- Tenement at 1 Plac Wolności.

== Gallery ==
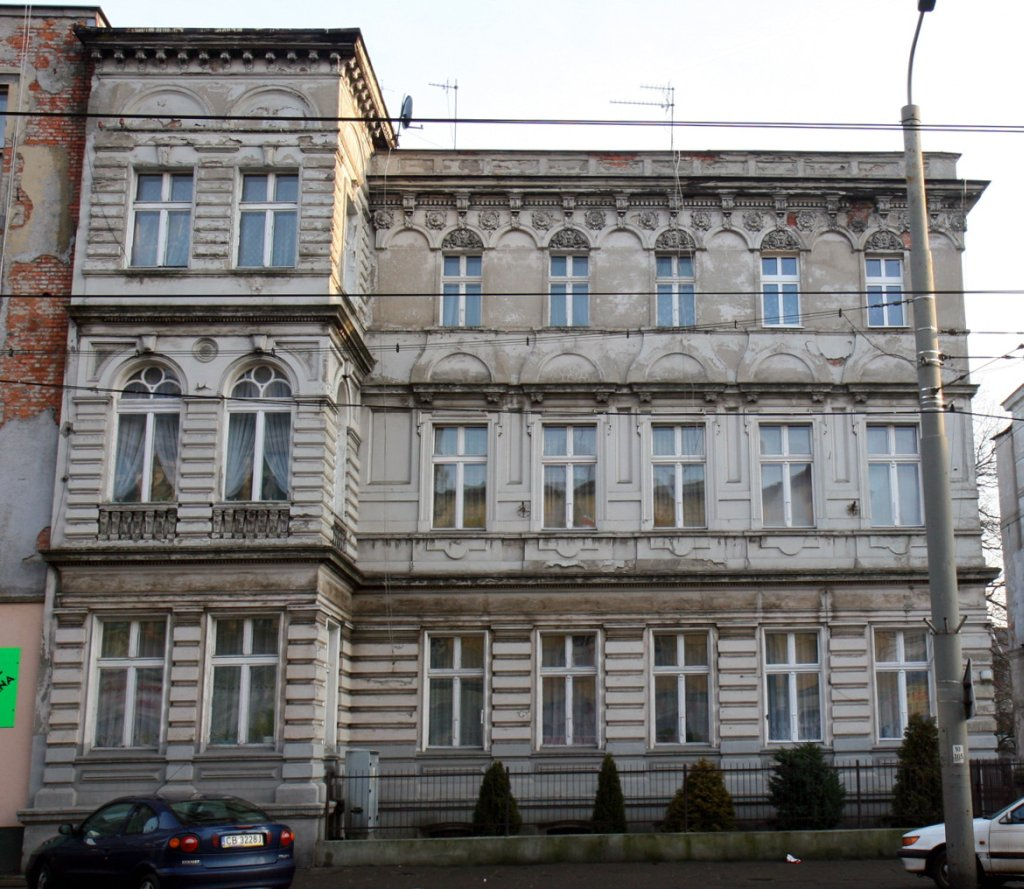
Frontage seen from Gdańska street

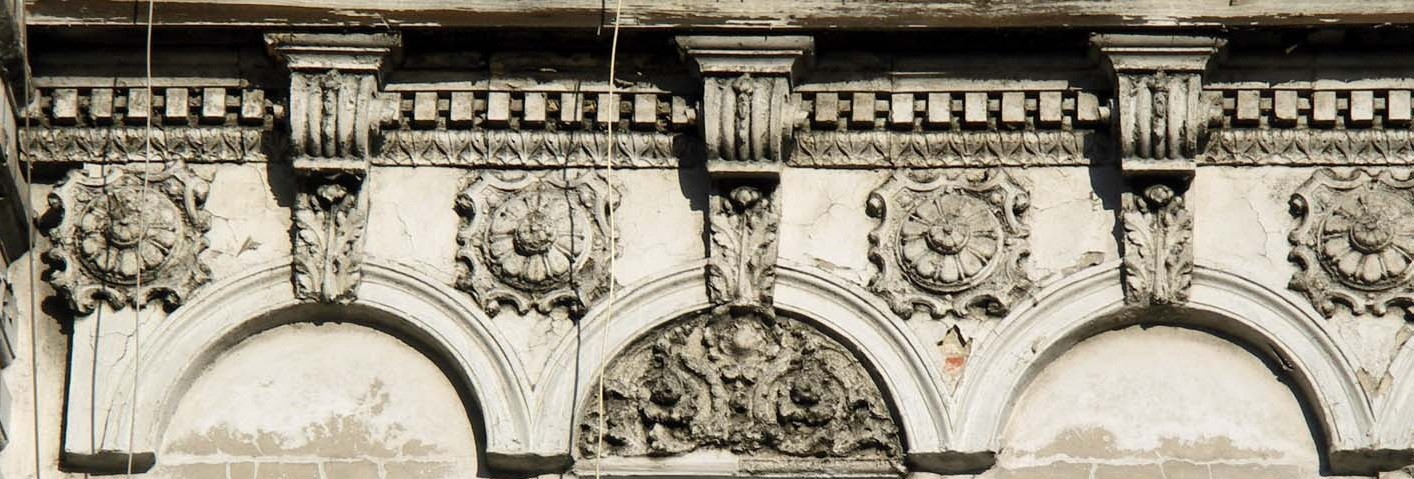
Detail of the facade frieze

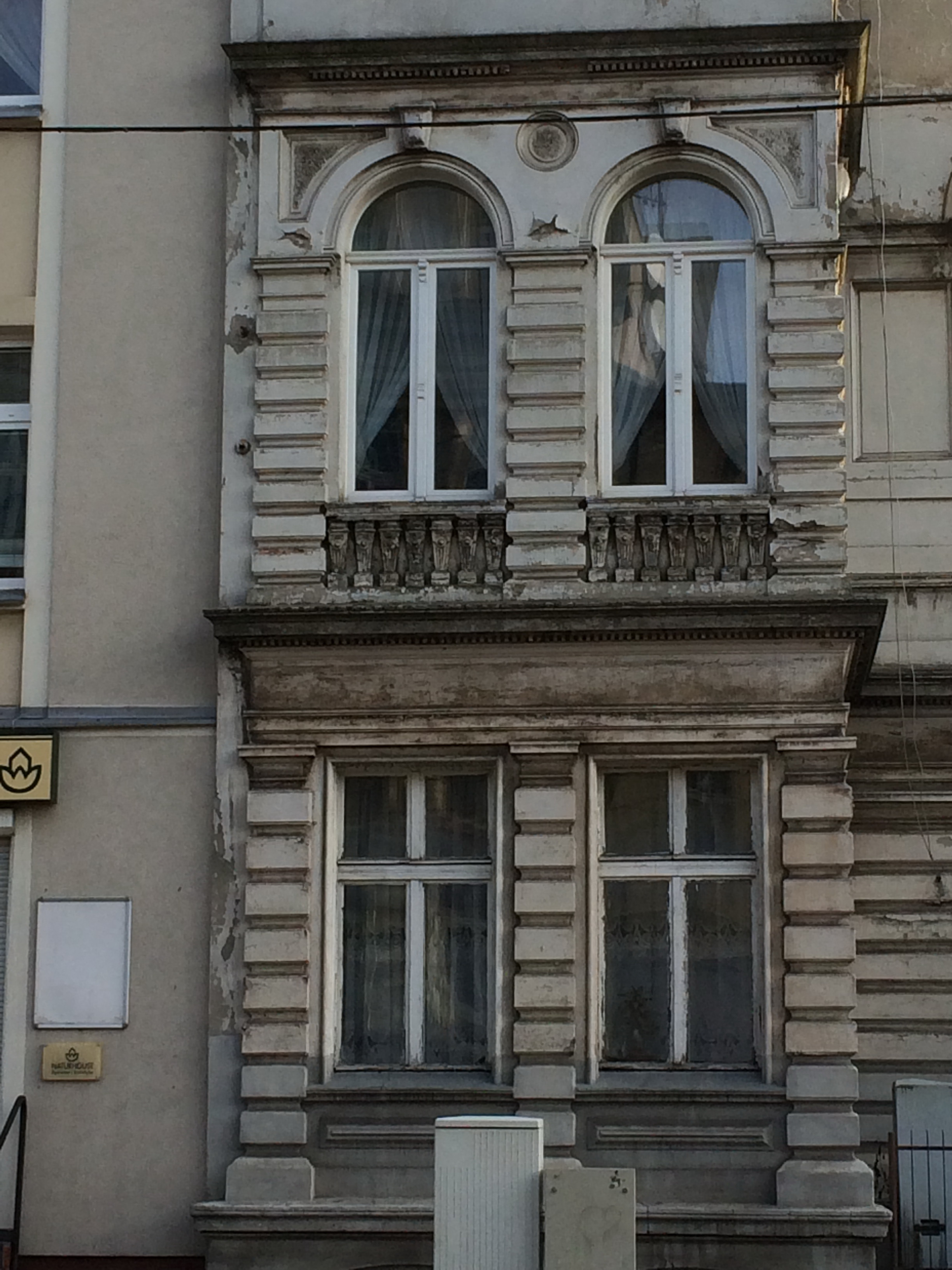
Window decoration details

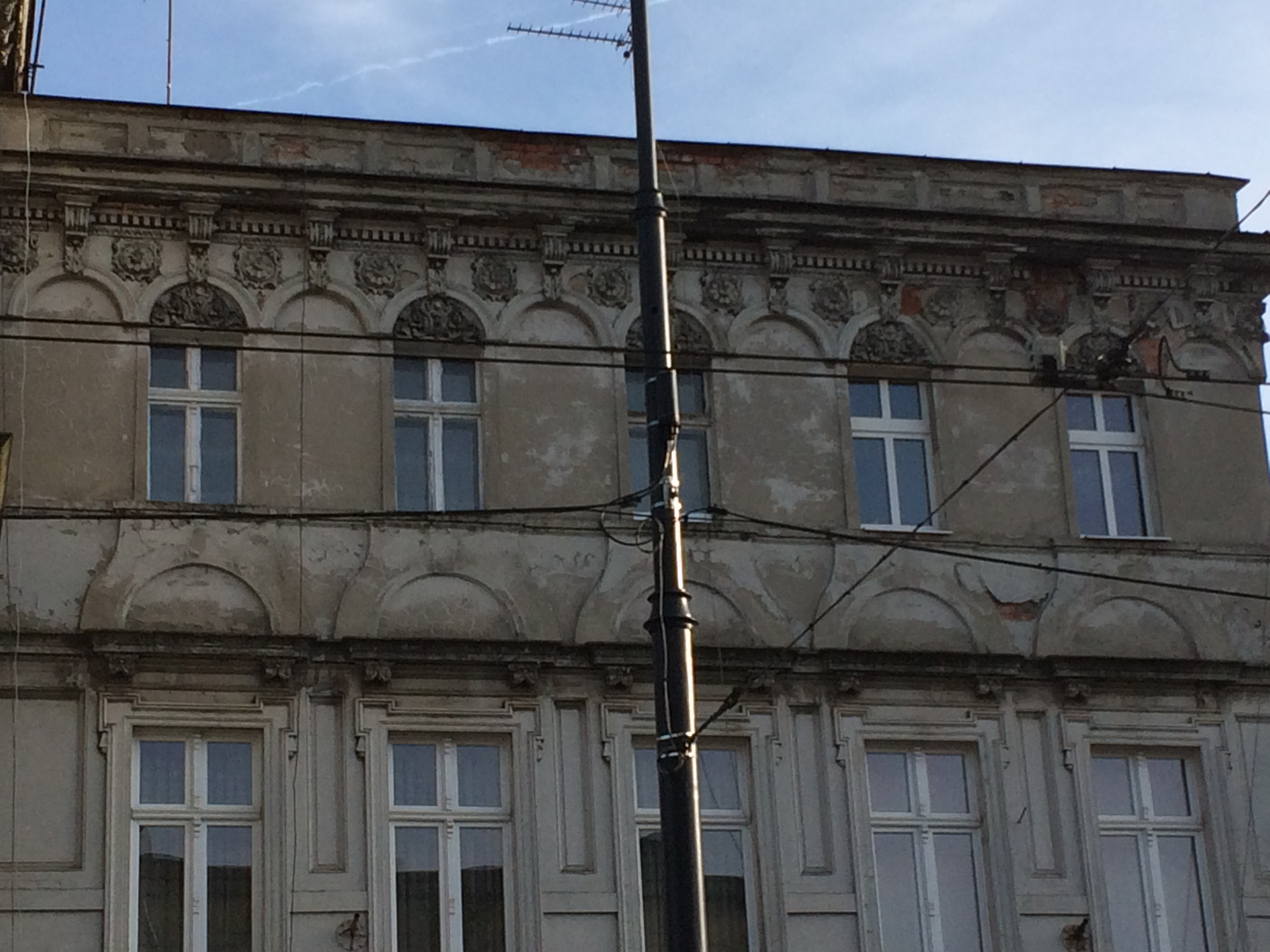
Detail of the upper facade

== See also ==
- Bydgoszcz
- Gdanska Street in Bydgoszcz
- Hugo Hecht tenement in Bydgoszcz
- Józef Święcicki
- Villa Hugo Hecht in Bydgoszcz
- Carbide Factory, Bydgoszcz

== Bibliography ==
- Bręczewska-Kulesza Daria, Derkowska-Kostkowska Bogna, Wysocka A. (2003). Ulica Gdańska. Przewodnik historyczny (in Polish). Bydgoszcz: Wojewódzki Ośrodek Kultury w Bydgoszczy. ISBN 8386970103.
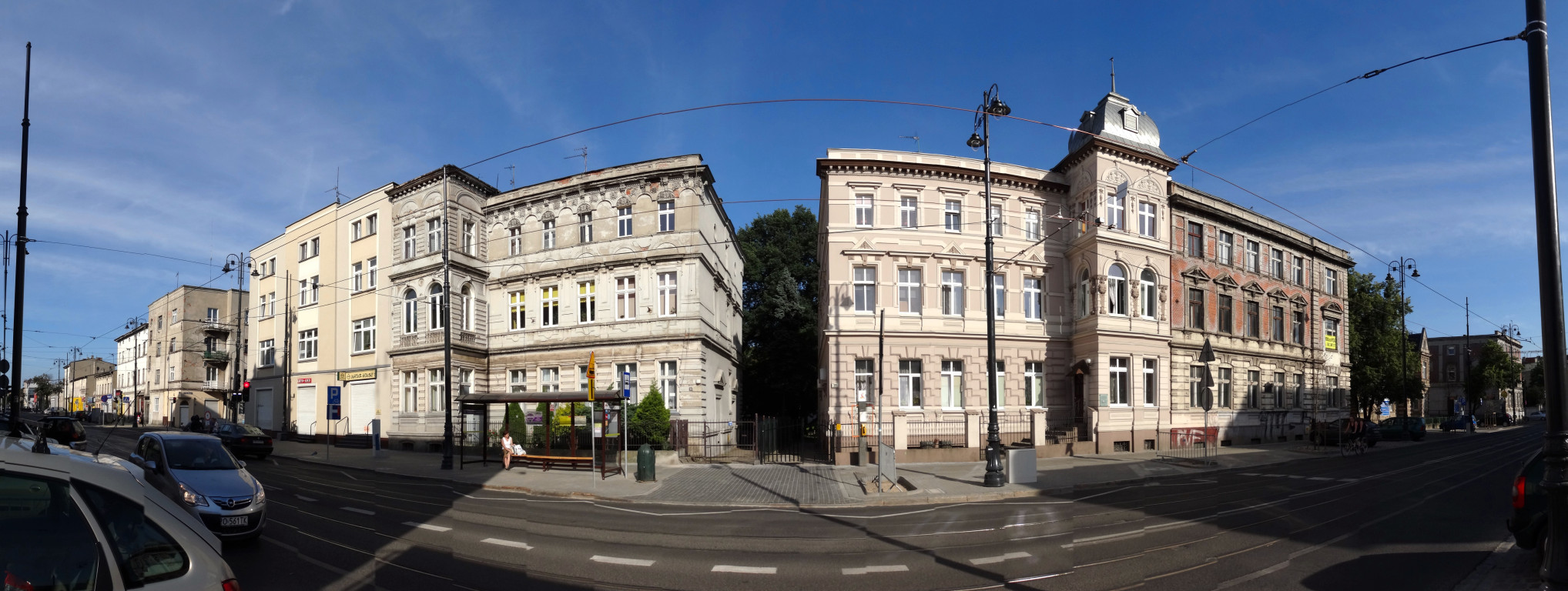
Panorama at Gdańska street. The tenement is on the left.
