= Hugo Hecht Tenement =

Hugo Hecht tenement
- Polish: Kamienice Hugona Hechta w Bydgoszczy
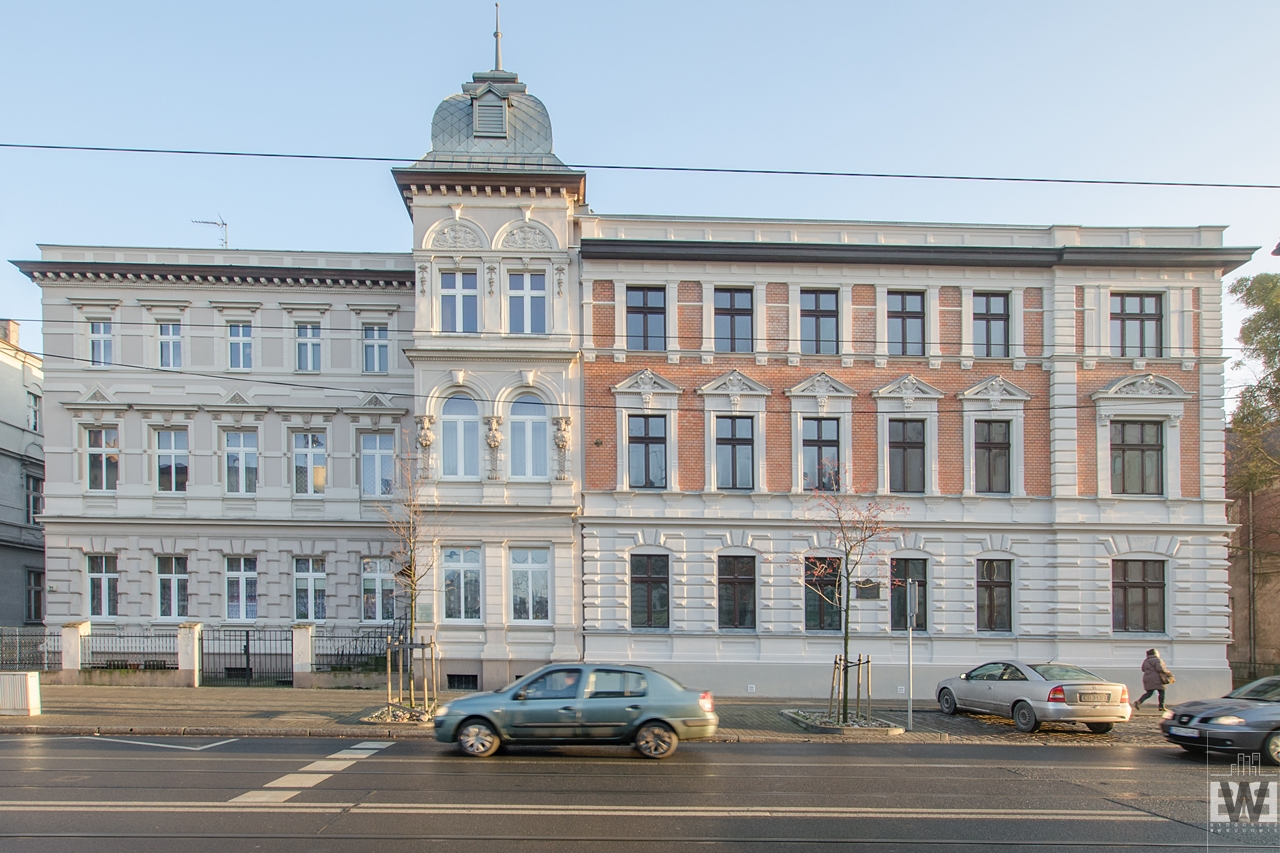
- Tenement from Gdanska Street
- Interactive map of the Hugo Hecht tenement area

General information
- Type: Tenement
- Architectural style: French Neo-Renaissance
- Classification: Nr.A/269/1, 21 August 1991
- Location: 92/94 Gdanska Street, Bydgoszcz, Poland
- Coordinates: 53°8′02″N 18°0′42″E
- Groundbreaking: 1889
- Completed: 1892
- Renovated: 1903, 1908
- Client: Hugo Hecht

Technical details
- Floor count: 3

Design and construction
- Architect: Józef Święcicki

The Hugo Hecht tenement is a historical habitation building located in Bydgoszcz, Poland. It is registered on the Kuyavian-Pomeranian Heritage List.

== Location ==
The building stands on the eastern side of Gdańska Street, at 92/94, between Zamoyskiego and Chodkiewicz streets. It stands close to notable tenements in the same street, such as the Villa Carl Grosse (at Nr.84), Otto Riedl Tenement (at Nr.85), Villa Hugo Hecht (at Nr.88/90) or the tenement at 91 Gdanska street.

== History ==
The two houses have been built in the years 1889-1890 (Nr.92) and 1891-1892 (Nr.94). They were part of a project of six close stylish buildings ordered by the merchant and dealer in timber Hugo Felix Franz Hecht. He assigned Bydgoszcz architect Józef Święcicki to realize his scheme. In 1903 a residential northern wing has been added to Nr.92, designed by George Weiss.

Five years later, Nr.94 building has been enriched with a vertical glazed steel-framed veranda, also designed by George Weiss. At this time, Mr Berger, the chief of the Police was living at this address (then Danzigerstrasse 123-124).

In 1922-1933, Nr.92 owner was Jan Maciaszek, the first interwar Mayor of Bydgoszcz, who took the power from the German hands in 1920.

Marshal Józef Piłsudski has been accommodated in this house in June 1921 during his stay in Bydgoszcz. In memory, a plaque realized by a local sculptor, Theodore Gajewski, has been put on the facade.

== Architecture ==
Both buildings, in their motives, are an example of style connected to Neo-Renaissance and Mannerism from various influences, predominantly French one.

In the same area, Józef Święcicki also realized other edifices including: Hotel "Pod Orlem" (14 Gdańska Street), the Oskar Ewald Tenement (30 Gdańska Street), the Józef Święcicki tenement (63 Gdańska Street), the Tenement at 86 Gdanska street and the Tenement at 1 Plac Wolności.

The building at Nr.92 has been put on the Kuyavian-Pomeranian Voivodeship Heritage List Nr.601317 Reg.A/967, on August 21, 1991.

== Gallery ==
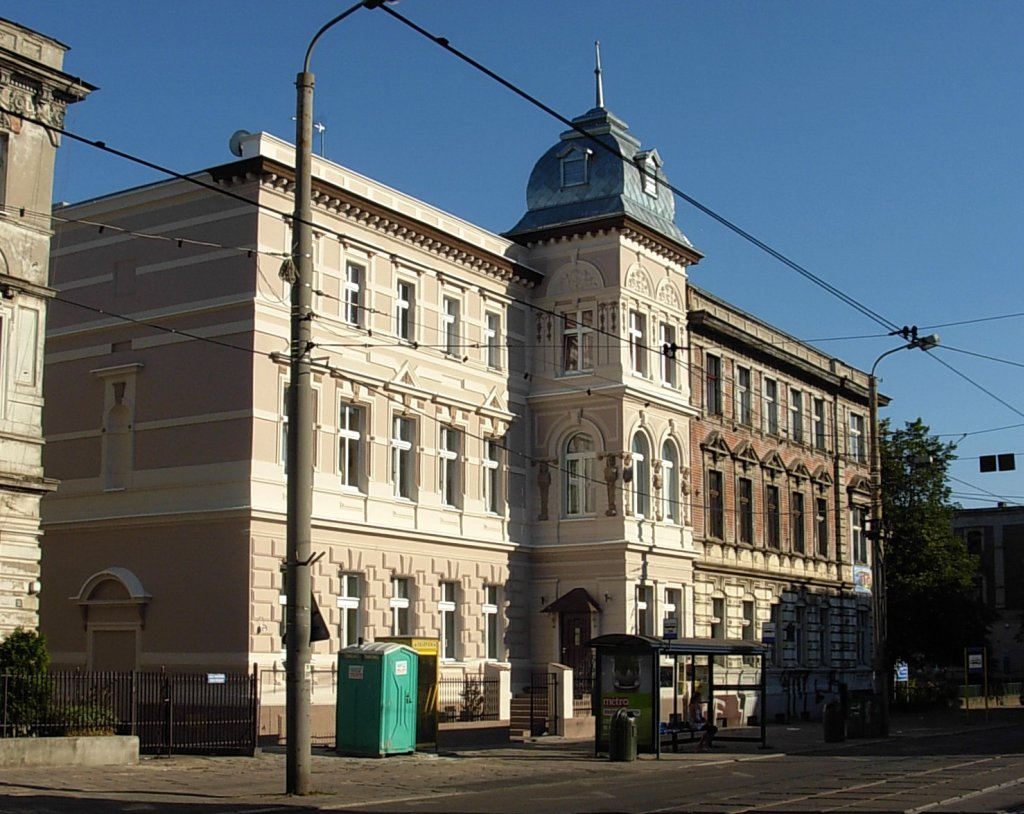
View on both buildings

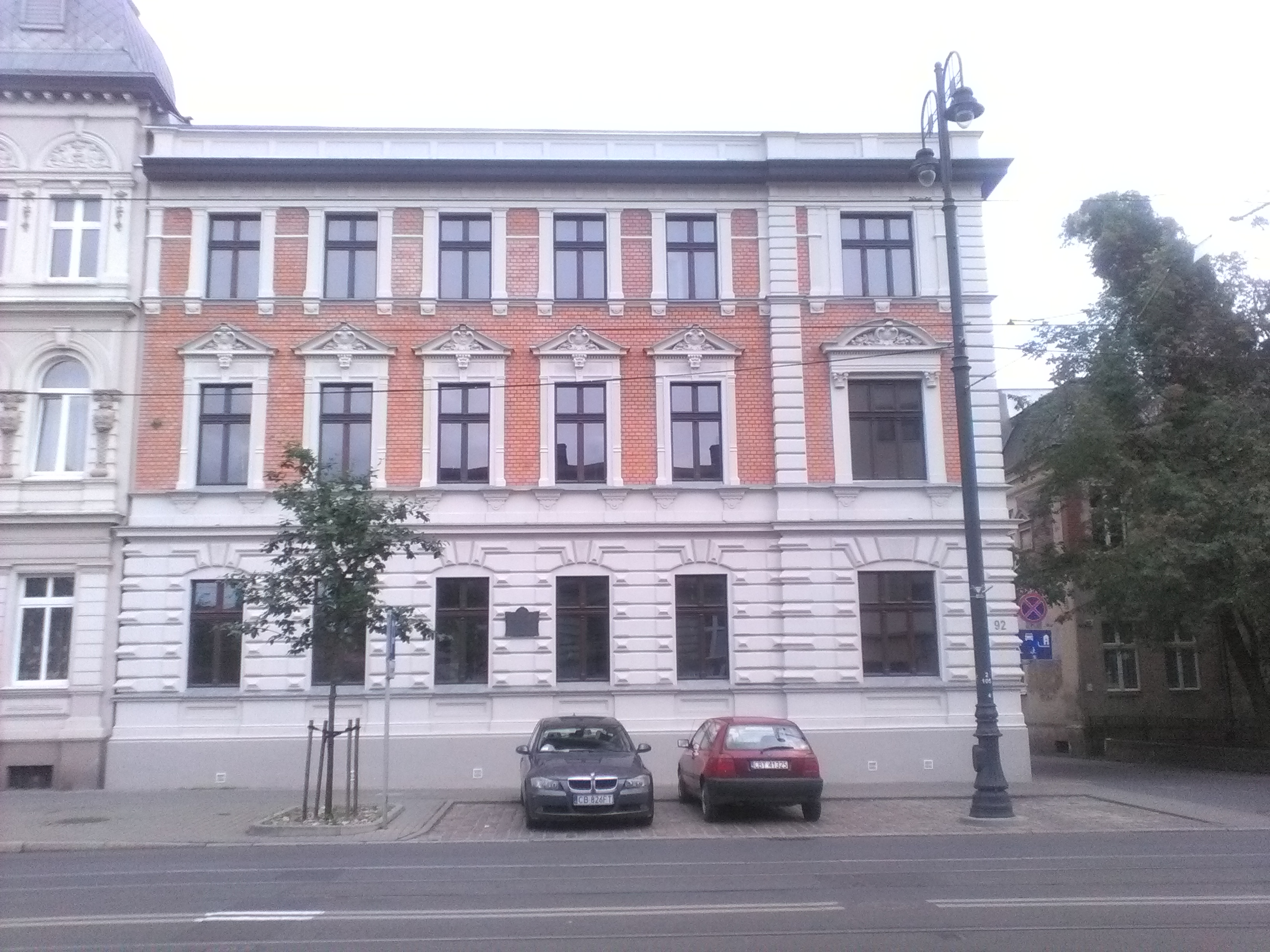
Nr.92

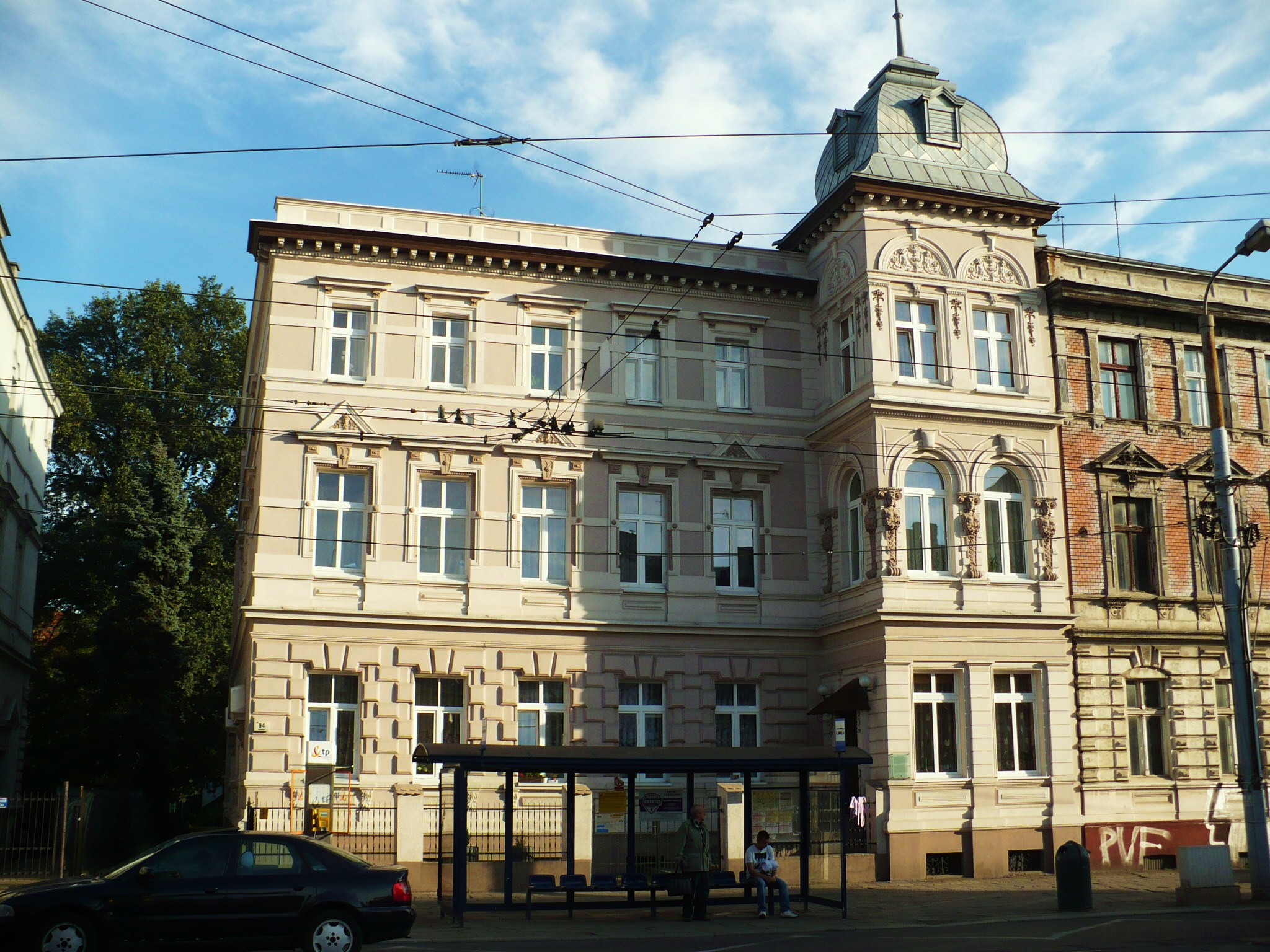
Nr.94

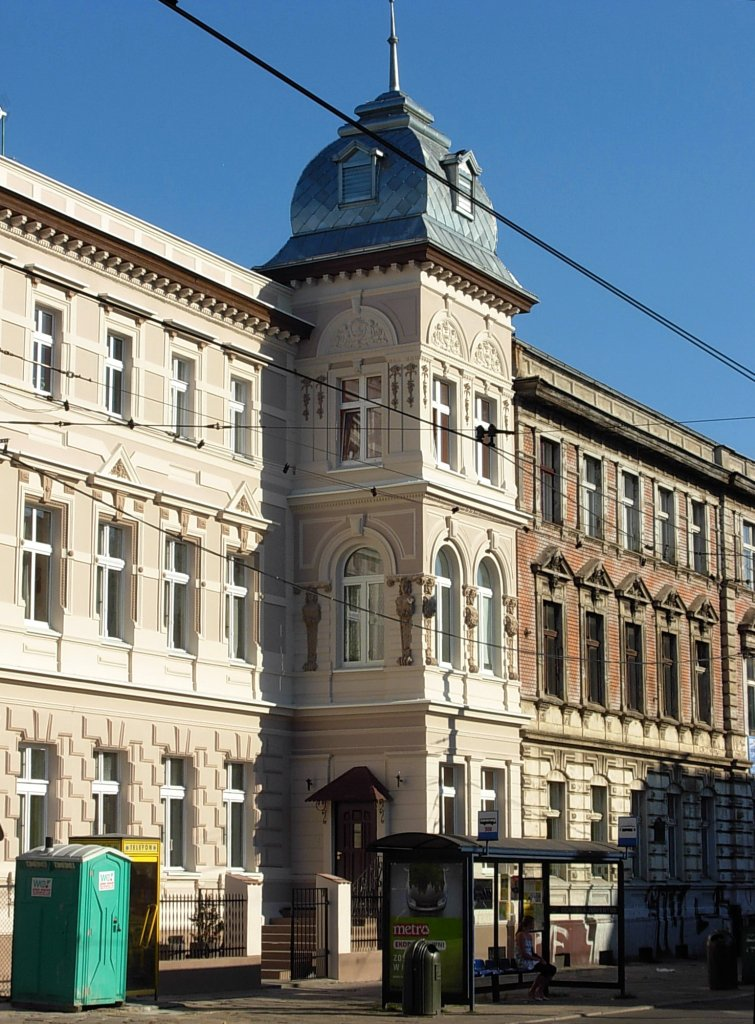
Avant-corps

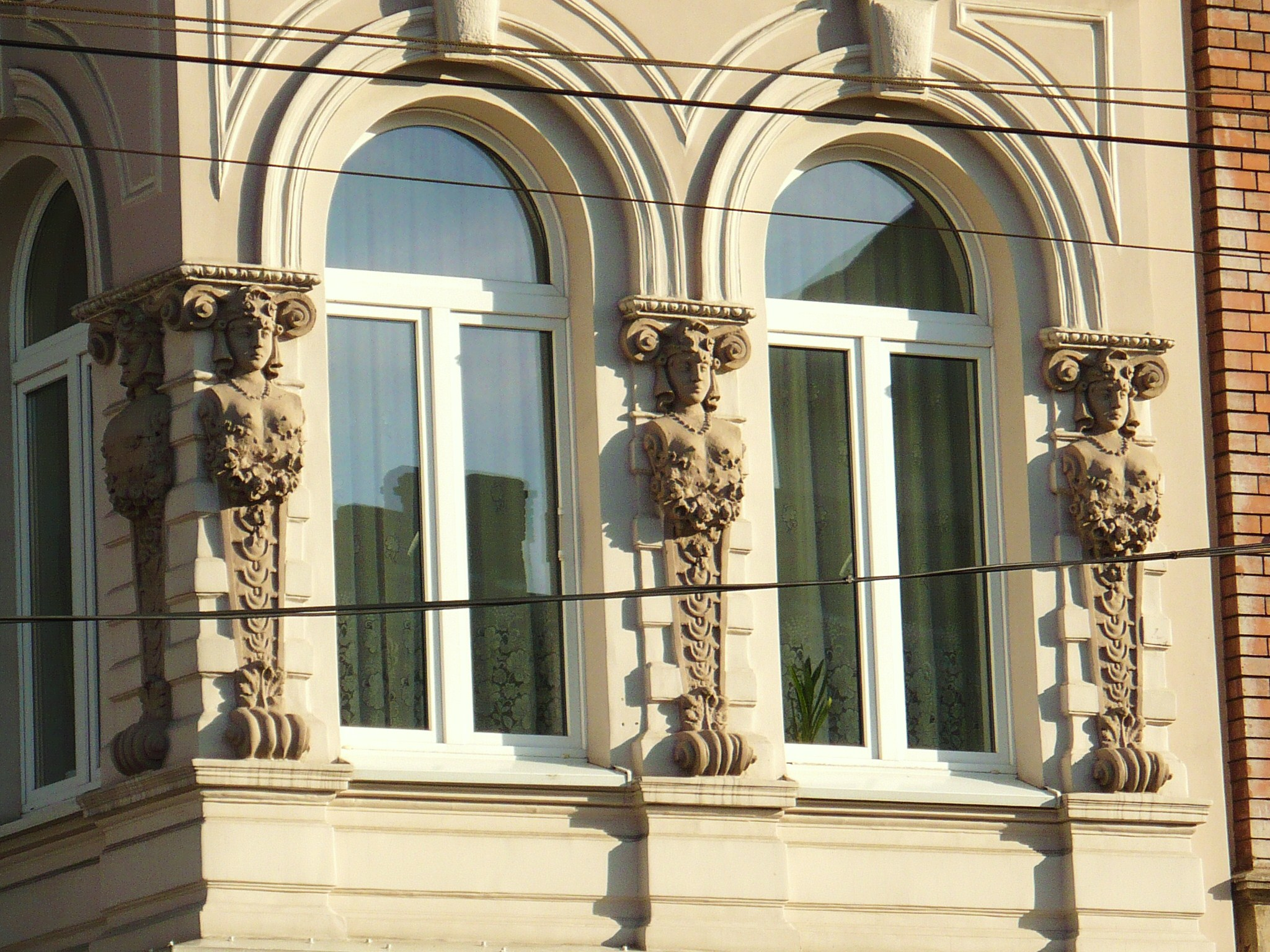
Caryatides

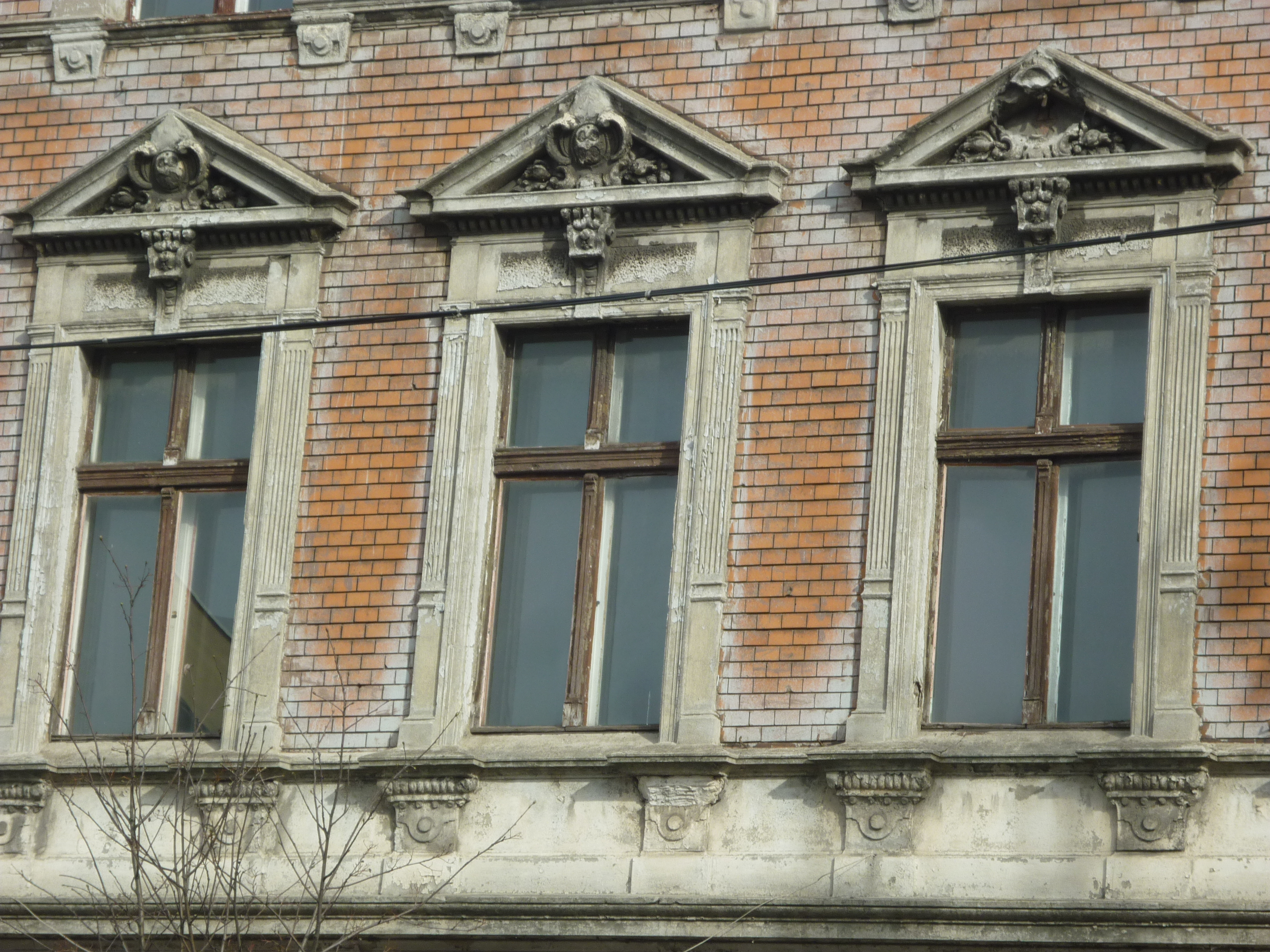
Details on Nr.92 facade

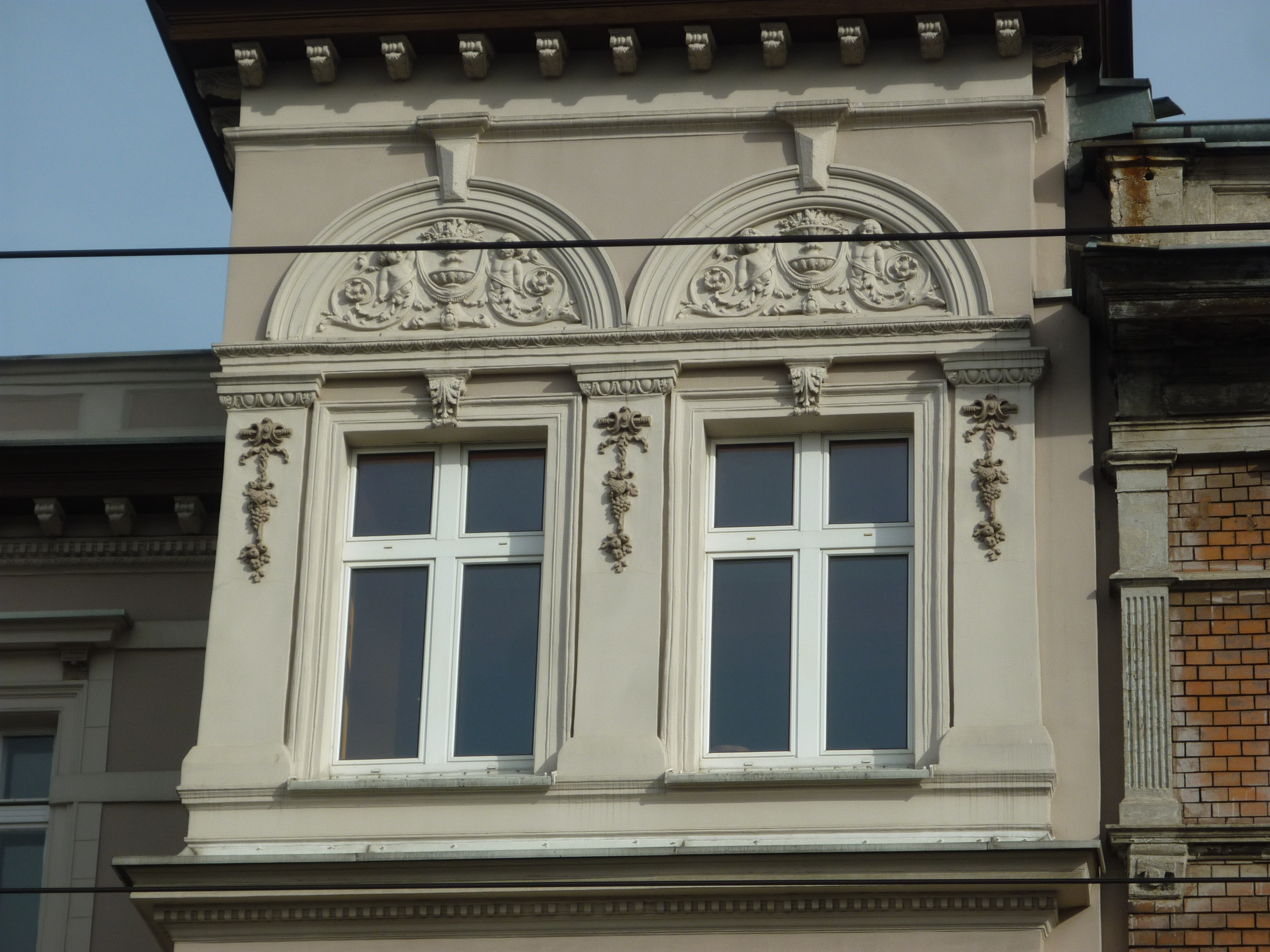
Details on Nr.94 facade

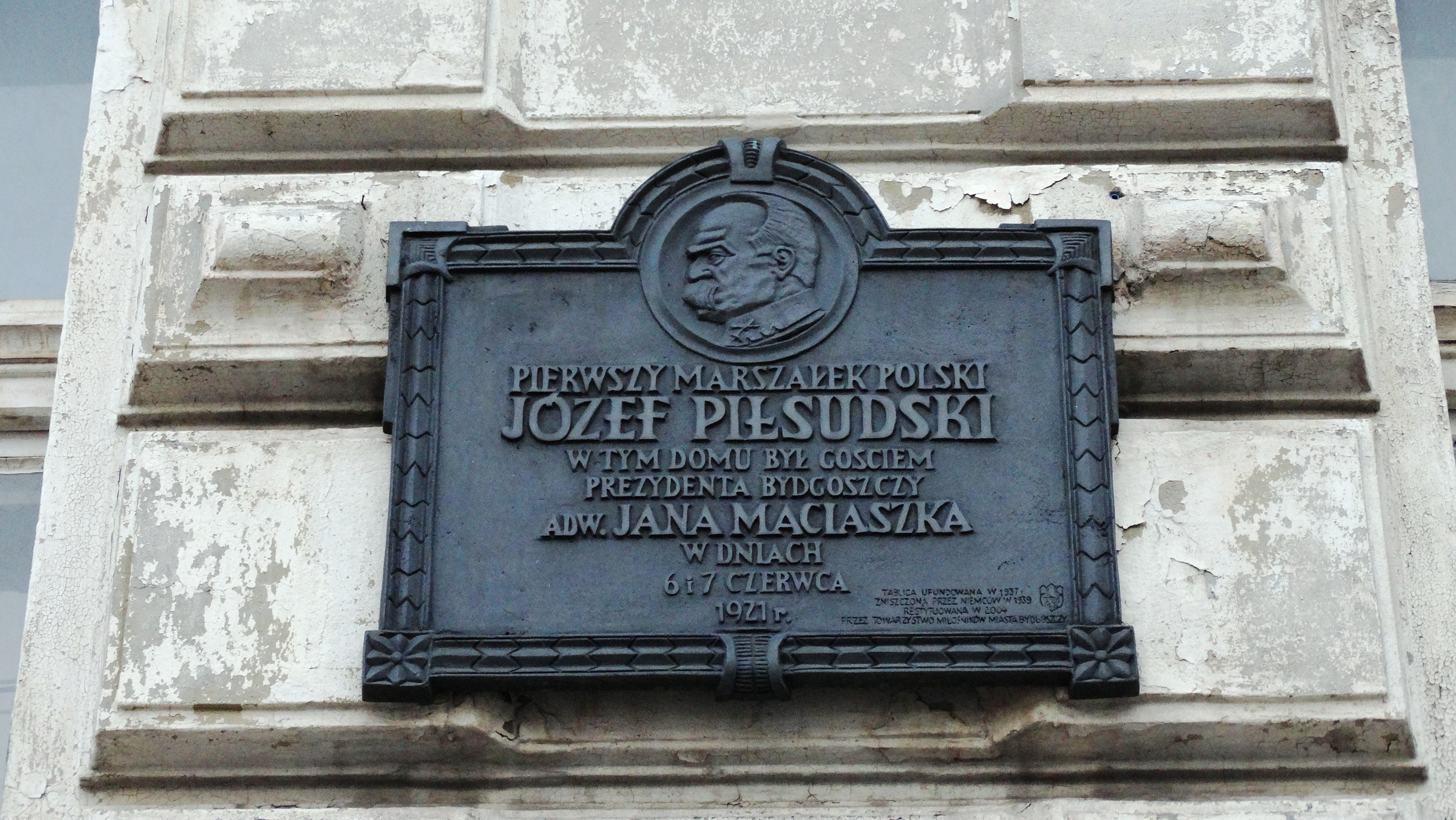
Józef Piłsudski's plaque

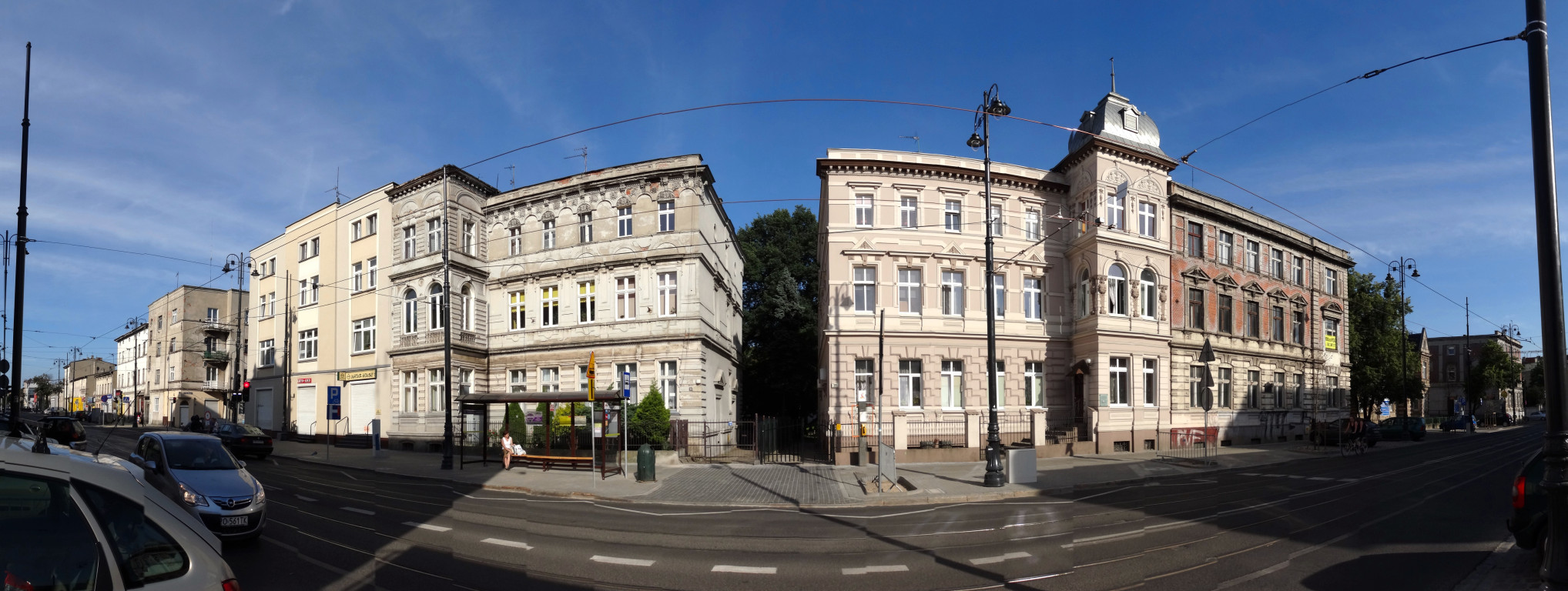
Panorama from Gdanska Street

== See also ==
- Bydgoszcz
- Gdanska Street in Bydgoszcz
- Building at 96 Gdanska St.
- Józef Święcicki

== Bibliography ==
- Bręczewska-Kulesza Daria, Derkowska-Kostkowska Bogna, Wysocka A. (2003). Ulica Gdańska. Przewodnik historyczny (in Polish). Bydgoszcz: Wojewódzki Ośrodek Kultury w Bydgoszczy. ISBN 8386970103.
