= Villa Hugo Hecht =

Villa Hugo Hecht in Bydgoszcz
- Polish: Willa Hugona Hechta w Bydgoszczy
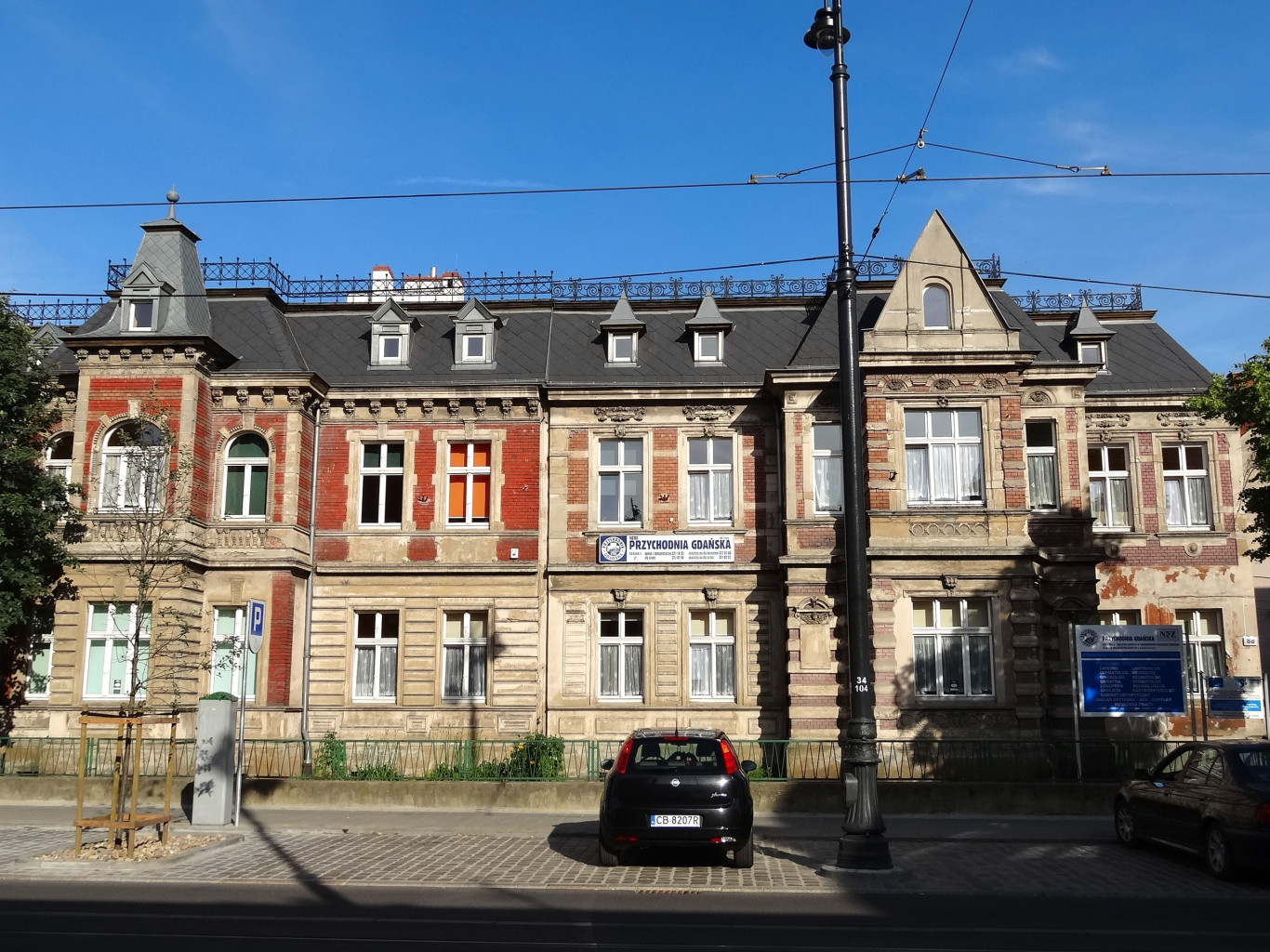
- View from Gdanska street
- Interactive map of the Villa Hugo Hecht in Bydgoszcz area

General information
- Type: Villa
- Architectural style: French Neo-Renaissance
- Classification: Nr.601315-Reg.A/137, 19 March 2004
- Location: 88/90 Gdanska street, Bydgoszcz, Poland, Poland
- Coordinates: 53°8′01″N 18°0′42″E
- Construction started: 1888
- Completed: 1889
- Client: Hugo Hecht

Technical details
- Floor count: 2

Design and construction
- Architect: Józef Święcicki

The Villa Hugo Hecht is a historical house in downtown Bydgoszcz, registered on the Kuyavian-Pomeranian Voivodeship Heritage List.

== Location ==
The house comprises two buildings (at Nr.88 and Nr.90). It lies on the eastern side of Gdańska Street, between Zamoyskiego and Chodkiewcza streets.

It stands close to remarkable tenements in the same street:

- Villa Carl Grosse at 84;
- Otto Riedl Tenement at 85;
- Tenement at 91 Gdanska street;
- Hugo Hecht tenement at 92/94.

== History ==
Both houses have been built in the years 1888-1889. They were part of a project of six close stylish buildings ordered by the merchant and dealer in timber Hugo Felix Franz Hecht. He assigned Bydgoszcz architect Józef Święcicki to realize his scheme.

The owner of the buildings between 1900 and 1939 was an activist and social worker in Bydgoszcz, physician Hermann Dietz. He had made in 1900 an residential wing added to the building, according to a design of the initial project manager, Joseph Święcicki. At this time, the address of the villa was 123-124 Danziger Straße.

== Architecture ==
The two juxtaposed buildings, covered with mansard roofs, seemingly create a uniform shape. However, the architect, through the use of different decorative motifs on each of the buildings, subtly contrasted them. Both villas represent a style modeled on the French Neo-Renaissance.

This is reflected in the choice of details and in the structure of the edifice with a characteristic avant-corps, topped with a decorative gable, breaking the facade symmetry. Frontage is decorated with diverse architectural details. Cast iron decorative elements have remained to this day, such as the barrier railing that runs along the roof of both buildings, pushing further the architectural unity of the edifice.

The building has been put on the Kuyavian-Pomeranian Voivodeship Heritage List Nr.601315 Reg.A/137, on March 19, 2004.

== Gallery ==
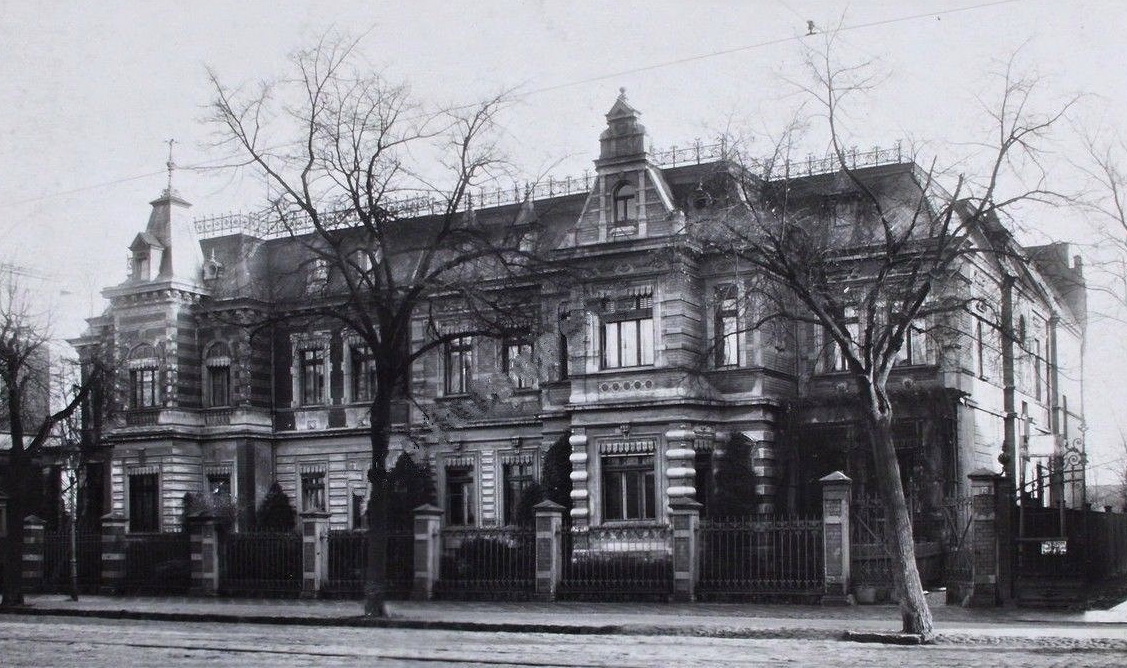
Villa Hugo Hecht ca 1900

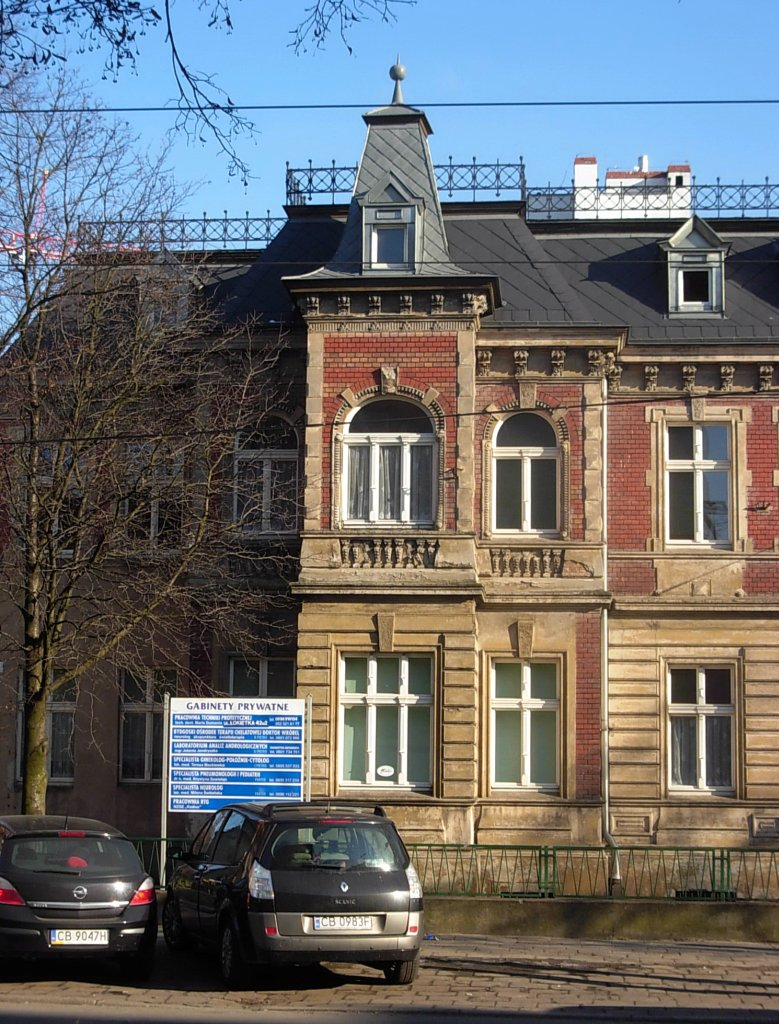
Facade of Nr.90

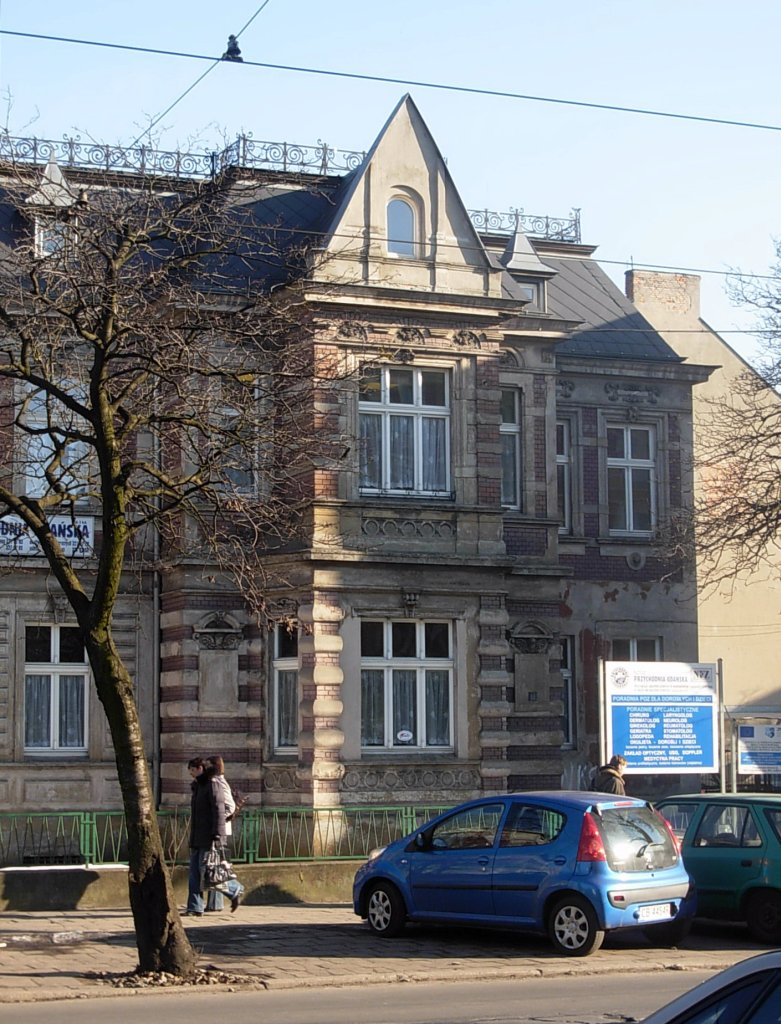
Facade of Nr.88

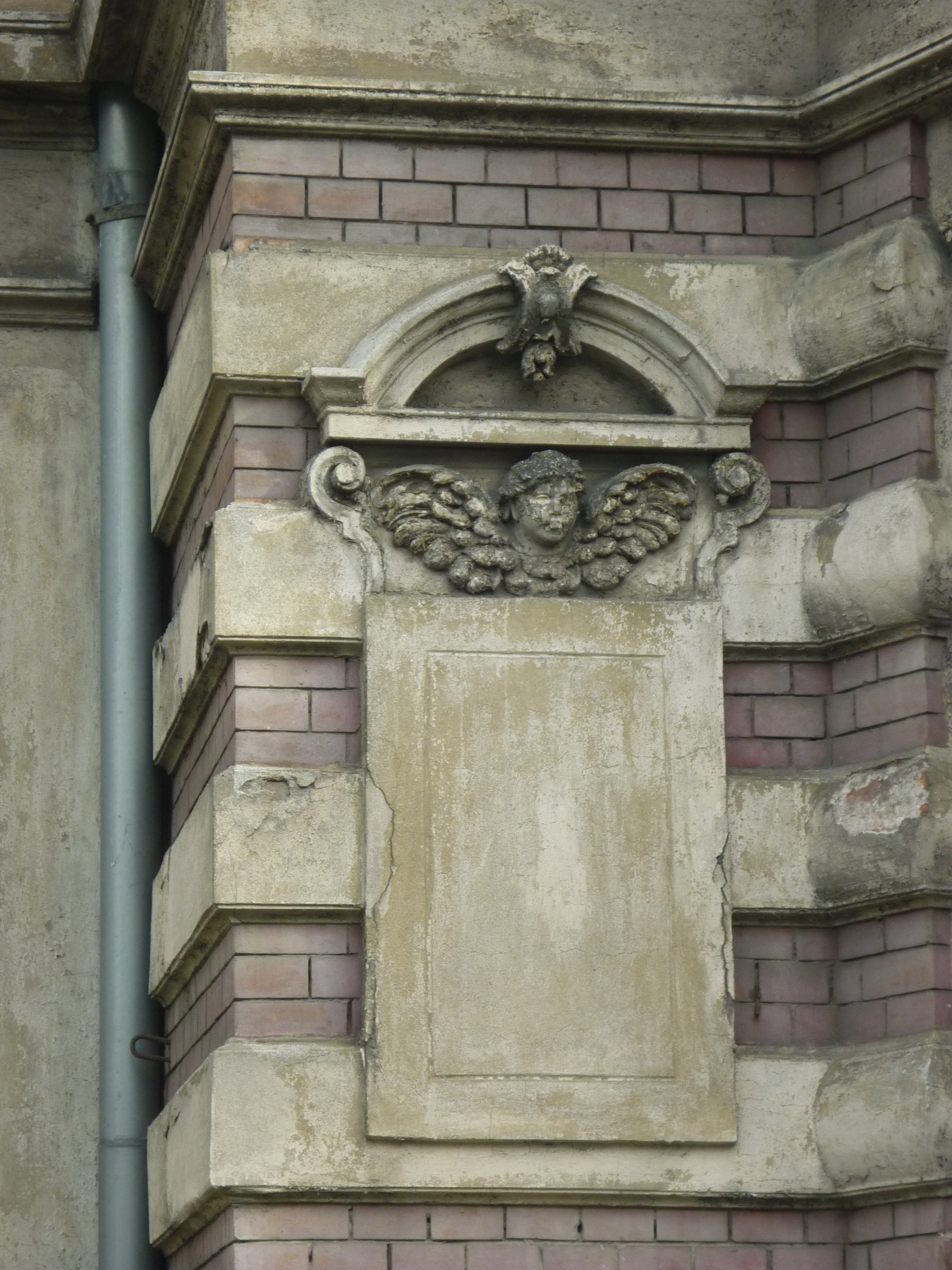
Detail of a relief

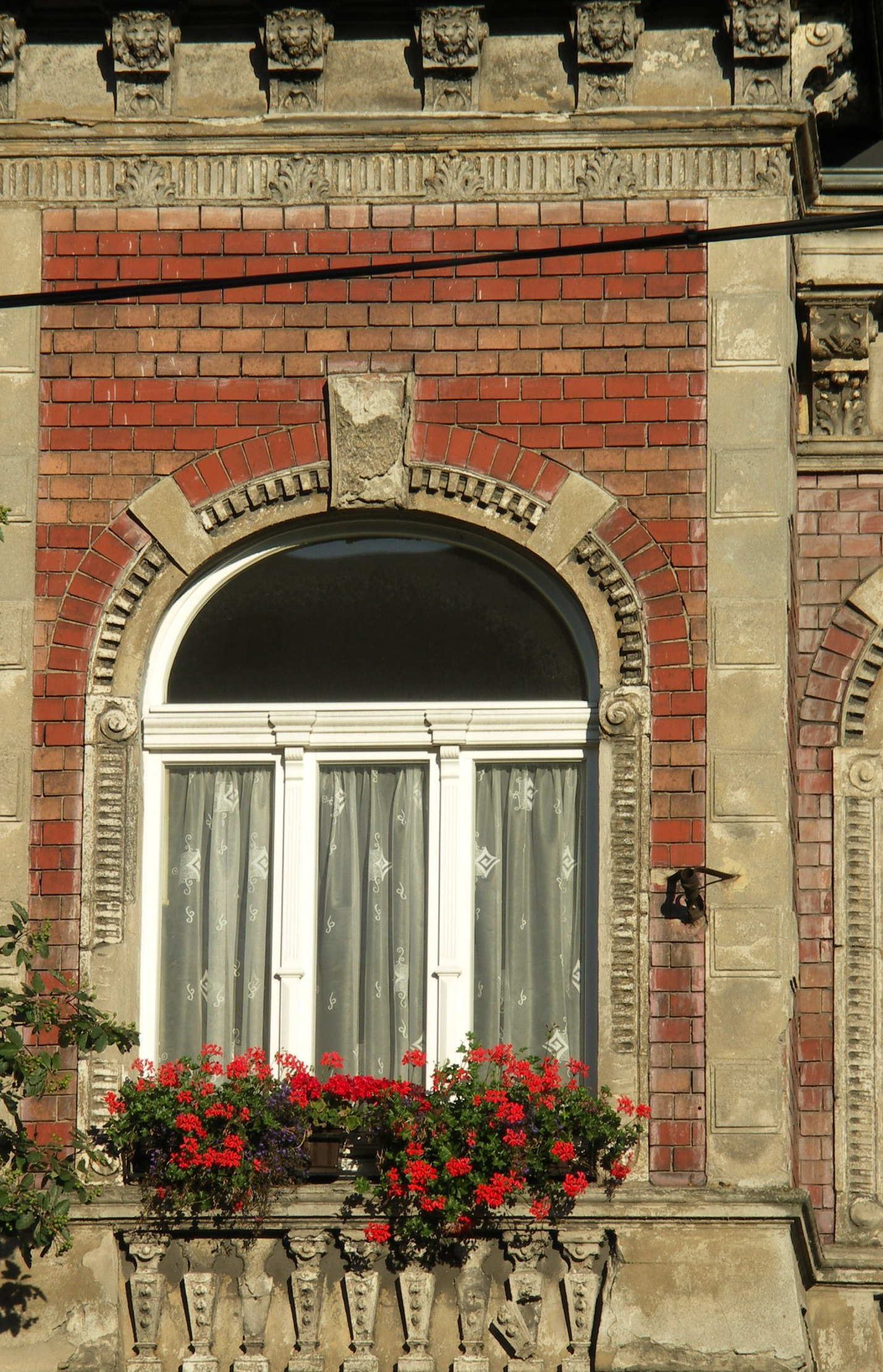
Window detail

== See also ==
- Gdanska Street in Bydgoszcz
- Józef Święcicki
- Hermann Dietz

== Bibliography ==
- Bręczewska-Kulesza Daria, Derkowska-Kostkowska Bogna, Wysocka A. (2003). Ulica Gdańska. Przewodnik historyczny (in Polish). Bydgoszcz: Wojewódzki Ośrodek Kultury w Bydgoszczy. ISBN 8386970103.
