= Sts. Peter and Paul Church (Bydgoszcz) =

Catholic Church, Bydgoszcz, Poland, 19th century

Coordinates: 53°07′36″N 18°00′19″E

- Kościół św. Piotra i Pawła w Bydgoszczy
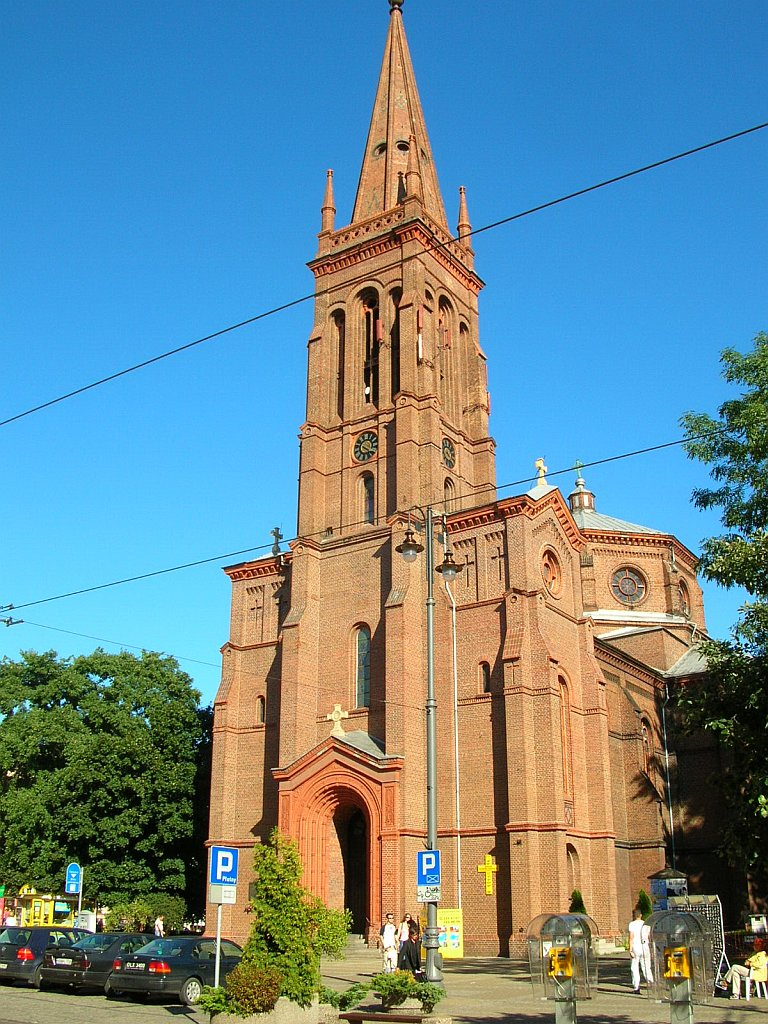
- Saint Peter's and Saint Paul's Church, Bydgoszcz
- Sts. Peter and Paul Church
- Location: Plac Wolności, Bydgoszcz
- Country: Poland
- Denomination: Roman Catholic Church
- Previous denomination: Lutheran rite
- Website: http://www.piotraipawla.pl/

History
- Founder(s): 1878 and 2 February 1945

Architecture
- Heritage designation: Nr.601237-Reg.A/751, 5 October 1971.
- Architect: Friedrich Adler
- Style: Eclecticism, Neo-Gothic, Neo-Romanesque elements
- Groundbreaking: 1872
- Completed: 1878

The Sts. Peter and Paul Church is located in Bydgoszcz, Poland, on Wolności Square. Patron saints are Saint Peter and Saint Paul. The church, richly decorated with polychrome has been realized in 1957 by Władysław Drapiewski from Pelplin and Leon Drapniewski of Poznań; it has been registered on the Pomeranian Heritage List on 5 October 1971.

== History ==
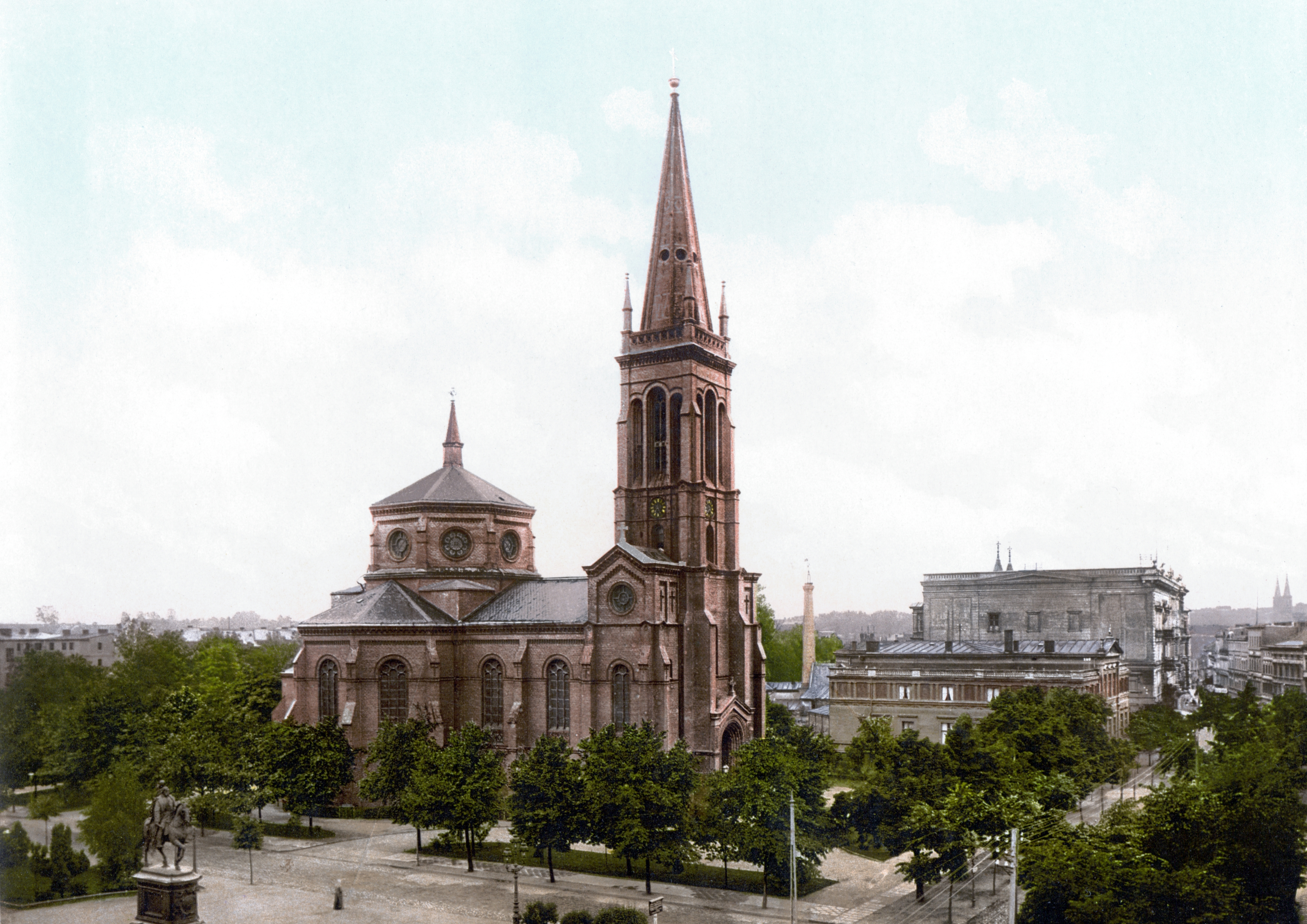
St Peter and St Paul Church, c. 1900

The church was built between 1872 and 1878, even though reference is made in the porch to 1876 as the date of completion of the construction. It was designed by Friedrich Adler for the purpose of the Lutheran rite and initially dedicated to Saint Paul. Adler was the son of an influential couple of Bromberg who owned the house at 4 Jezuicka Street at the beginning of the 19th century. Construction work was led by municipal architect Heinrich Grüder.

Material for decoration of the façade (moulded bricks and tiles, probably terracotta) was brought from (Berlin-)Charlottenburg. Stained glasses adorning the choir and sacristy were produced by the Imperial Institute of Stained Glass in Berlin, founded by Emperor William I.

The building was equipped with underfloor gas heating, a central boiler room set under the chancel, two heaters with hot air ducts, and approximately 200 gas lamps. Its organ was built by the well-known organ builder Wilhelm Sauer at Frankfurt (Oder). Lutheran rite liturgy was performed until 1945.

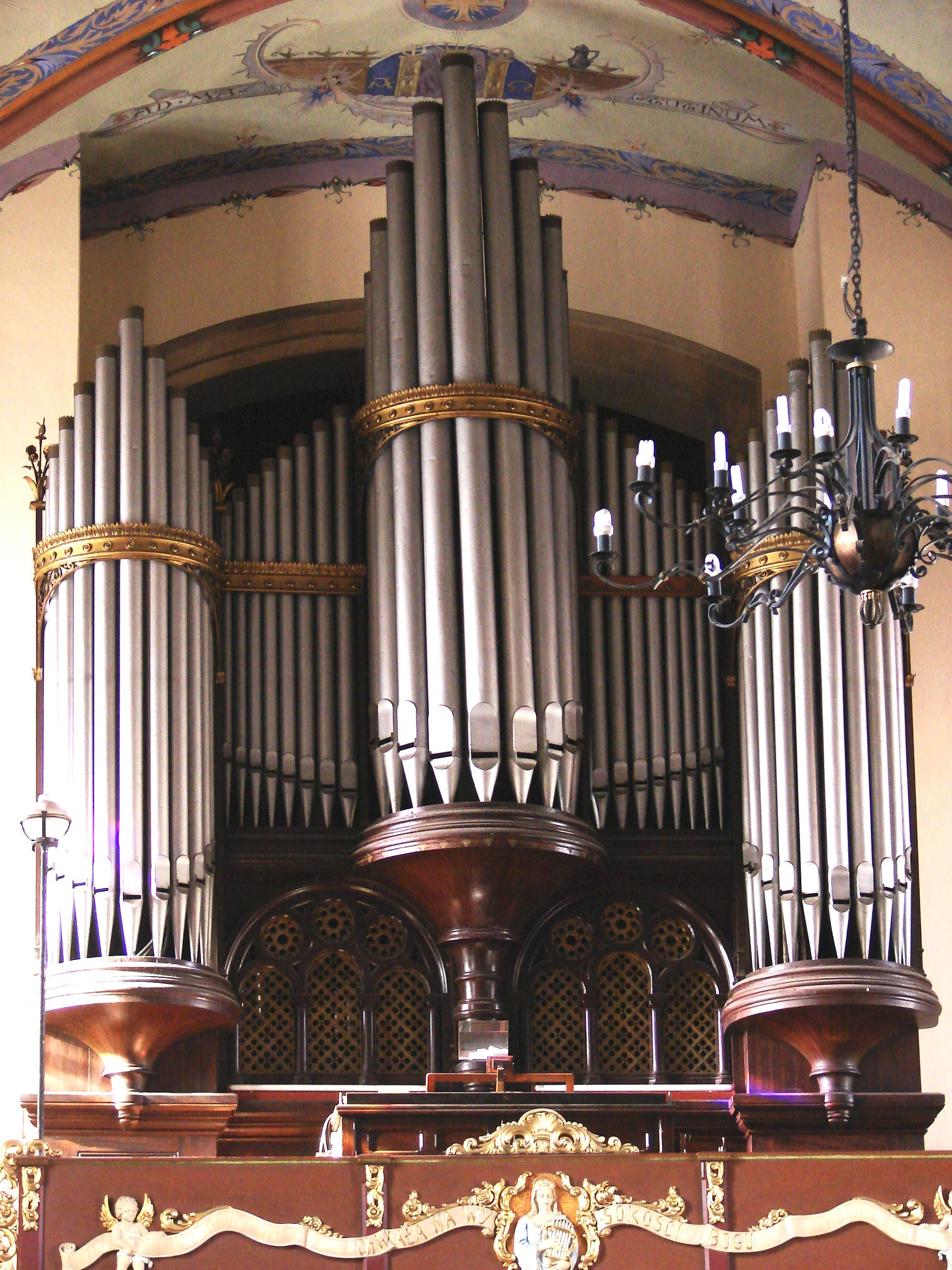
Organ of St Peter and St Paul church in Bydgoszcz

On 3 September 1939, during Bydgoszcz "Bloody Sunday" episode, German irregulars shot at retreating troops of the Polish Army from the temple spire. During World War II, the building was severely damaged, both in 1939 following the "Bloody Sunday" and in 1945 during the artillery firing of the city.

On 2 February 1945 the Catholic Church confiscated the building by having expropriated the protestant congregation. Its dedication was presided over by Mgr Jan Konopczyński on the day of the celebration of the Presentation of Jesus at the Temple. It served as a church and also as a school and was administered by the Parish of the Sacred Heart of Jesus in Bydgoszcz. The decree was issued on 24 August 1946, signed by cardinal August Hlond, and on 1 October, the church was established a parish under the name of "Holy apostles Peter and Paul".

Under Stalinist era, the building came close to be demolished, like e. g. the Municipal Theatre. The pretext for the authorities was the importance of damages resulted from the military operations in 1945: artillery shells pierced the ceiling through the facade of the church, tore down and ruined the organ and ruined the spire. On 19 April 1945 Bydgoszcz interim city council adopted a resolution on decommissioning and tearing down the church. Confronted to a firm and collective opposition, urban authorities suggested the transfer of the rite to the Garrison Church (now Bernardine Church of Our Lady Queen of Peace) of Bydgoszcz, which would have allowed the building on Wolności square to be razed. In June 1947, the idea was abandoned when was disclosed the plan to erect a monument to Joseph Stalin in place of the demolished church. In fact, the demolition didn't go through, thanks to the steadfast attitude of the parishioners, the parish priest Stanislaw Wisniewski and the full support of the ecclesiastical hierarchy.

The renovation of the organ and the repair of damaged stained glasses and scorched windows happened in October 1947, all paid by collected funds.

Between 1949 and 1957, the interior of the church was refurbished for the parish, and renovation occurred 1966-1967. The great altar was designed and made by the sculptor Sylwester Fryska. An 1854 painting from Maksymilian Piotrowski, Madonna of the Immaculate Conception was installed, a vestige coming from the former Jesuit church Saint Ignatius of Loyola in Bydgoszcz destroyed by the Nazis in 1940. In 1957, the church received a rich polychrome decor and in 1966 were placed at the altar the painting "Last Supper" and the figure of St. Peter and Paul, works of the artists Mikulski and Mrówczyński. In the 1990s, an overhaul of the tower was conducted and stained glasses replaced.

== Architecture ==
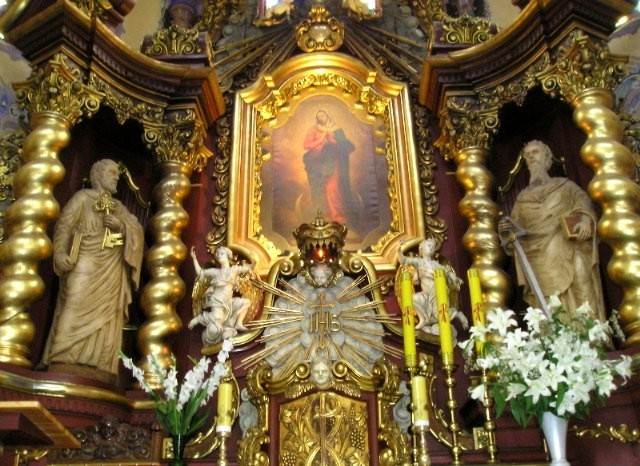
Main altar with Maksymilian Piotrowski painting

The church was built externally in the Neo-Gothic eclectic style with neo-romanesque elements. The interior is Neo-Baroque. It is the most complex architectural temple in Bydgoszcz.

The edifice is designed on a Latin cross pattern, with the nave on the eastern side and a high tower on the western one. The church can contain 2500 people. A characteristic feature of the church architecture is the dome which raises from an octagonal drum. The tower is topped with a classicism - neo-romanesque style spire. Three bells ring from tower, one of which was cast in 1876. The church has buttresses, its brick facades are decorated with friezes and cornices, and it has semicircular window openings or Diocletian windows. At the base of the tower, the porch is richly decorated. Along the arms of the transept and the western side of the nave runs a large gallery.

Inside the church, we can find cross-ribbed vaults, with the dome located at the intersection between the Nave and the transept. On the roof arch is the preserved inscription 'Siehe, ich bin bei Euch alle tage bis Ende an der Welt Matt.' (I'll be with you all the days until the end of the world. St. Matthew). We can note the highly detailed ceramics, which are prevalent to Prussian municipal buildings and religious edifices erected in Bydgoszcz during the second half of the 19th century and the beginning of the 20th century. Stained glasses in the chancel were also produced by Prussian Imperial Stained Glass Institute (German: Königliches Institut für Glasmalerei) in Berlin and funded by Emperor William II. Beside the Church, grows a planetree registered on the Polish Natural Monuments' list: this is a 346 cm trunk circumference tree.

=== Altar ===
The main Neo-Baroque altar, features a painting of Blessed Virgin Mary from 1854, by local artist Maximilian Piotrowski; and a sculpture of Saint Peter and Saint Paul. The altar was realized in 1957 by Bydgoszcz sculptor Sylwester Fryska.

=== Organ ===
The 42-pipe pipe organ was built by Wilhelm Sauer's company in Frankfurt an der Oder in 1877, commissioned by the Evangelical-Unionist community, which then owned the church.

On 16 October 2007 the instrument, along with all the elements inside the church were registered on the Kuyavian-Pomeranian Voivodeship Heritage list.

== Gallery ==
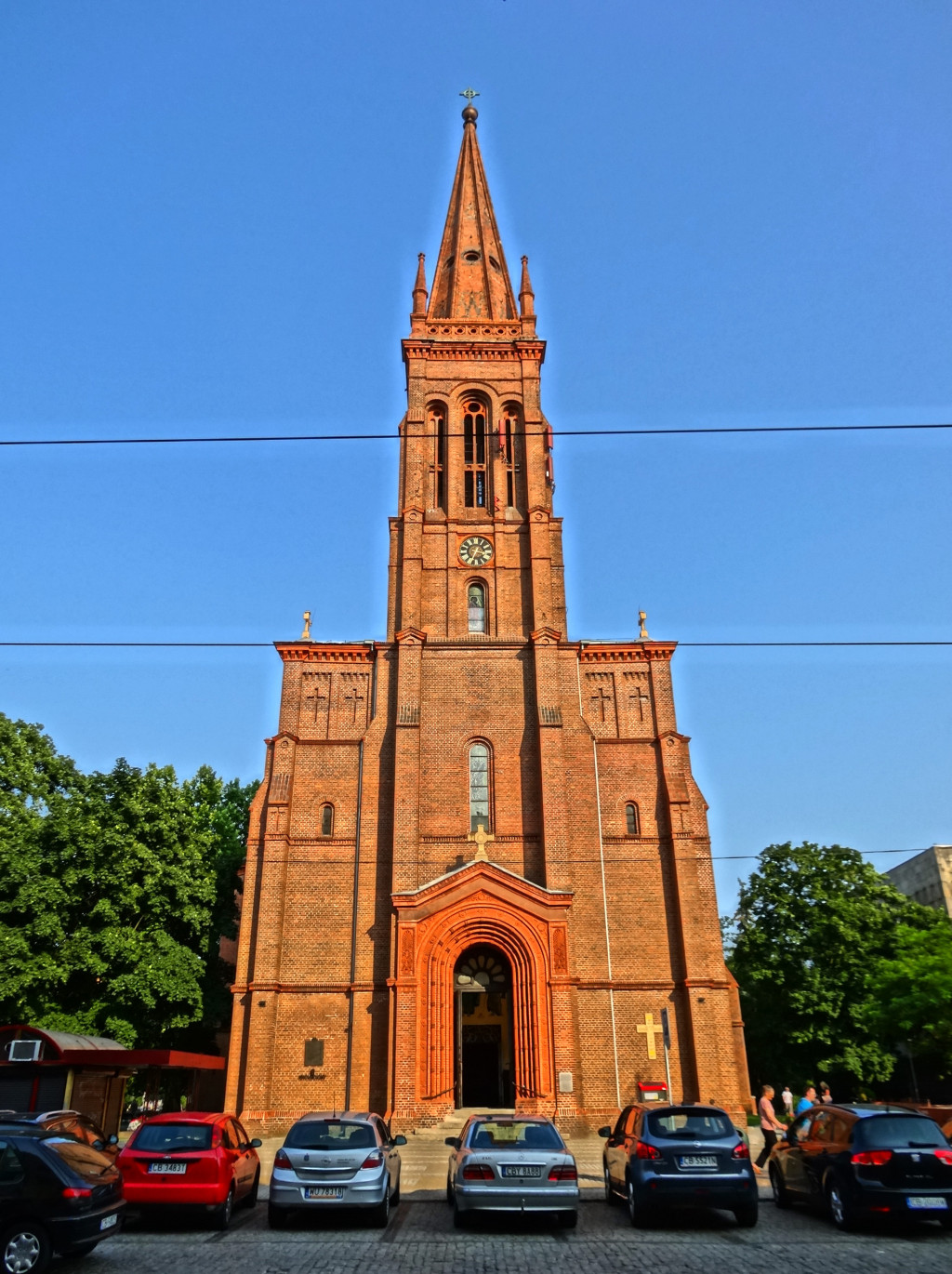
Front view from Gdanska Street

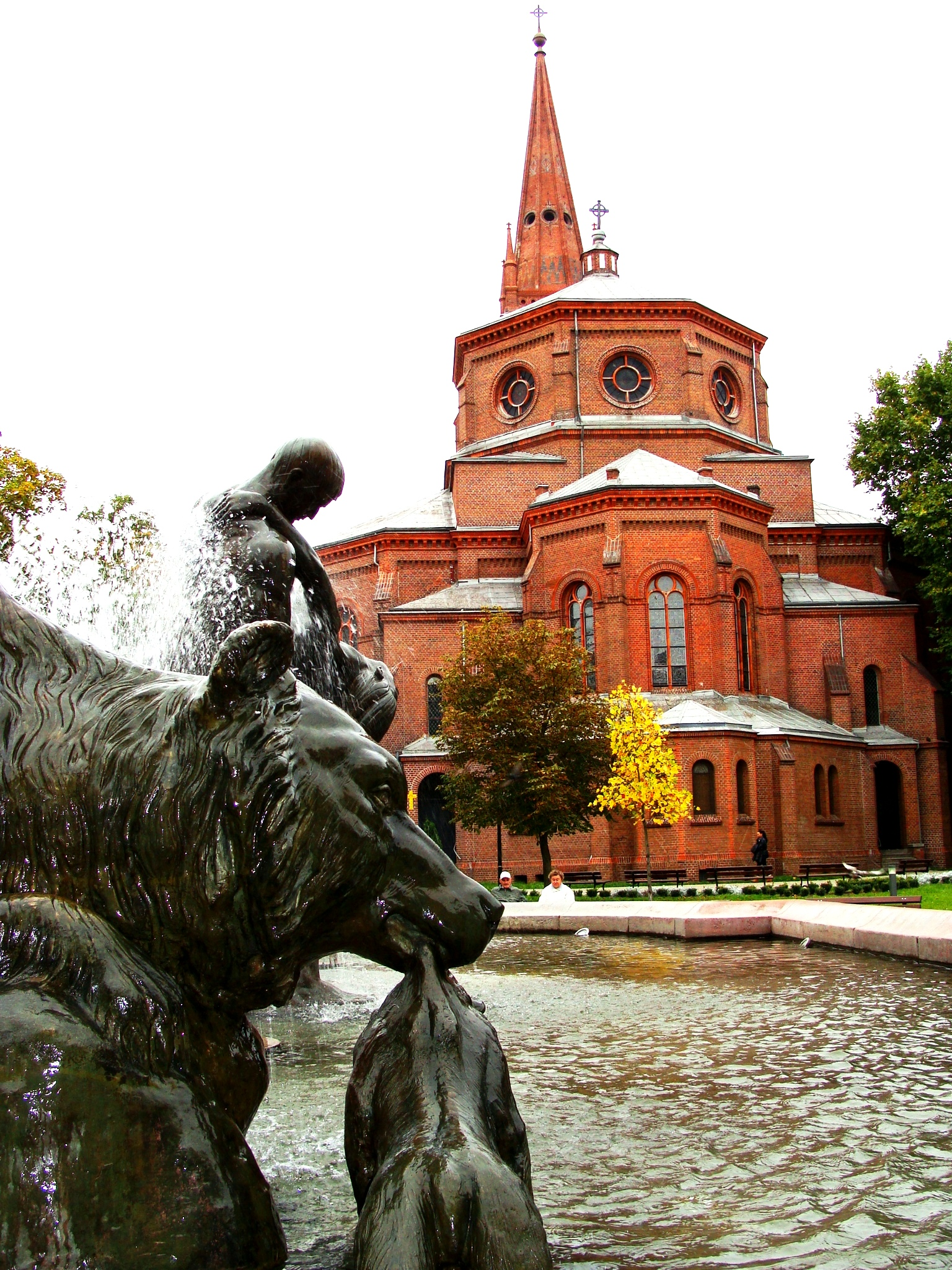
Back view with fountain "The Deluge" in the park Casimir the Great.

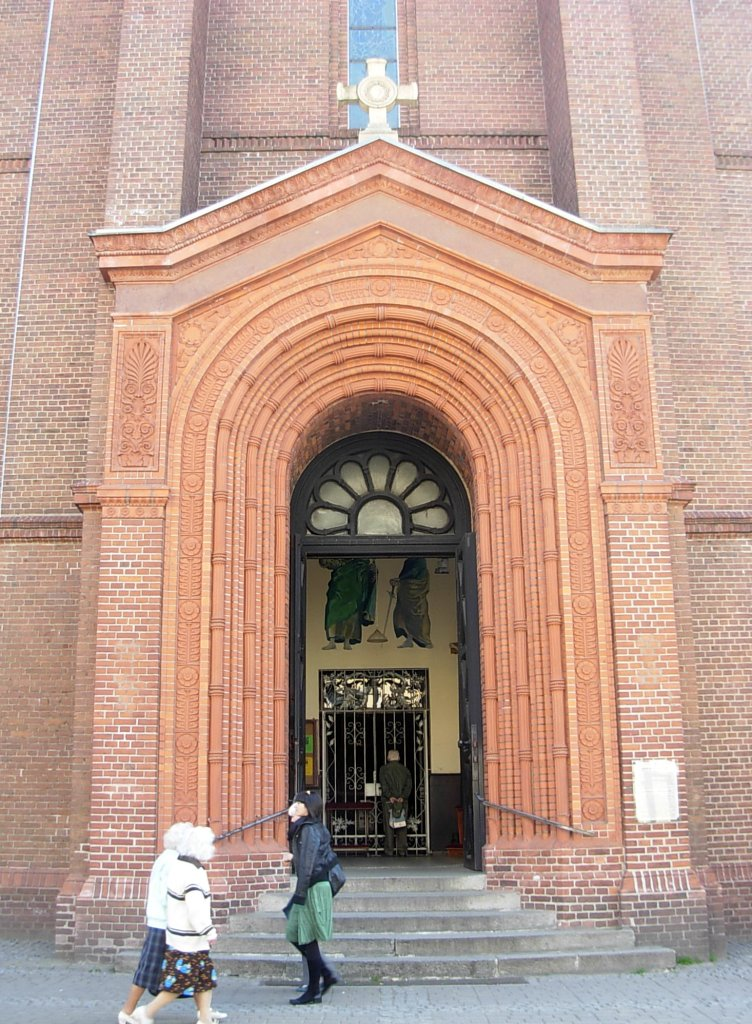
Portal

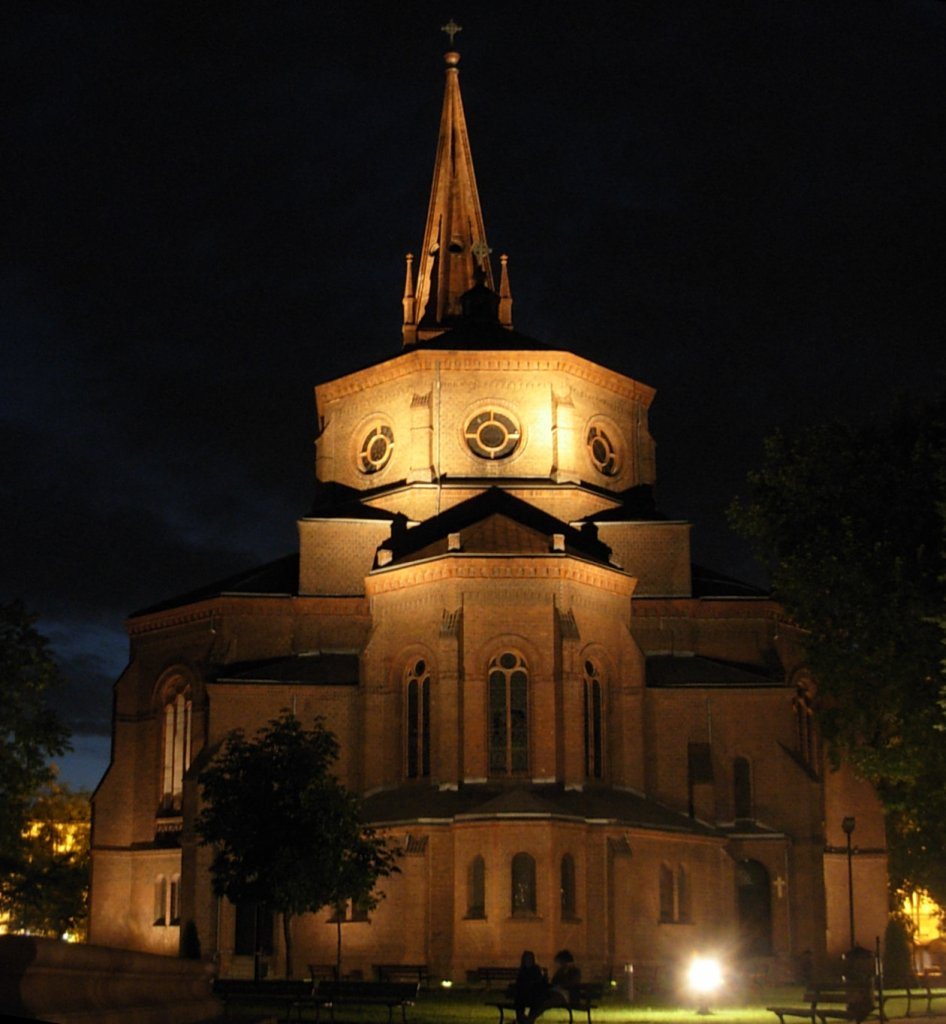
By night

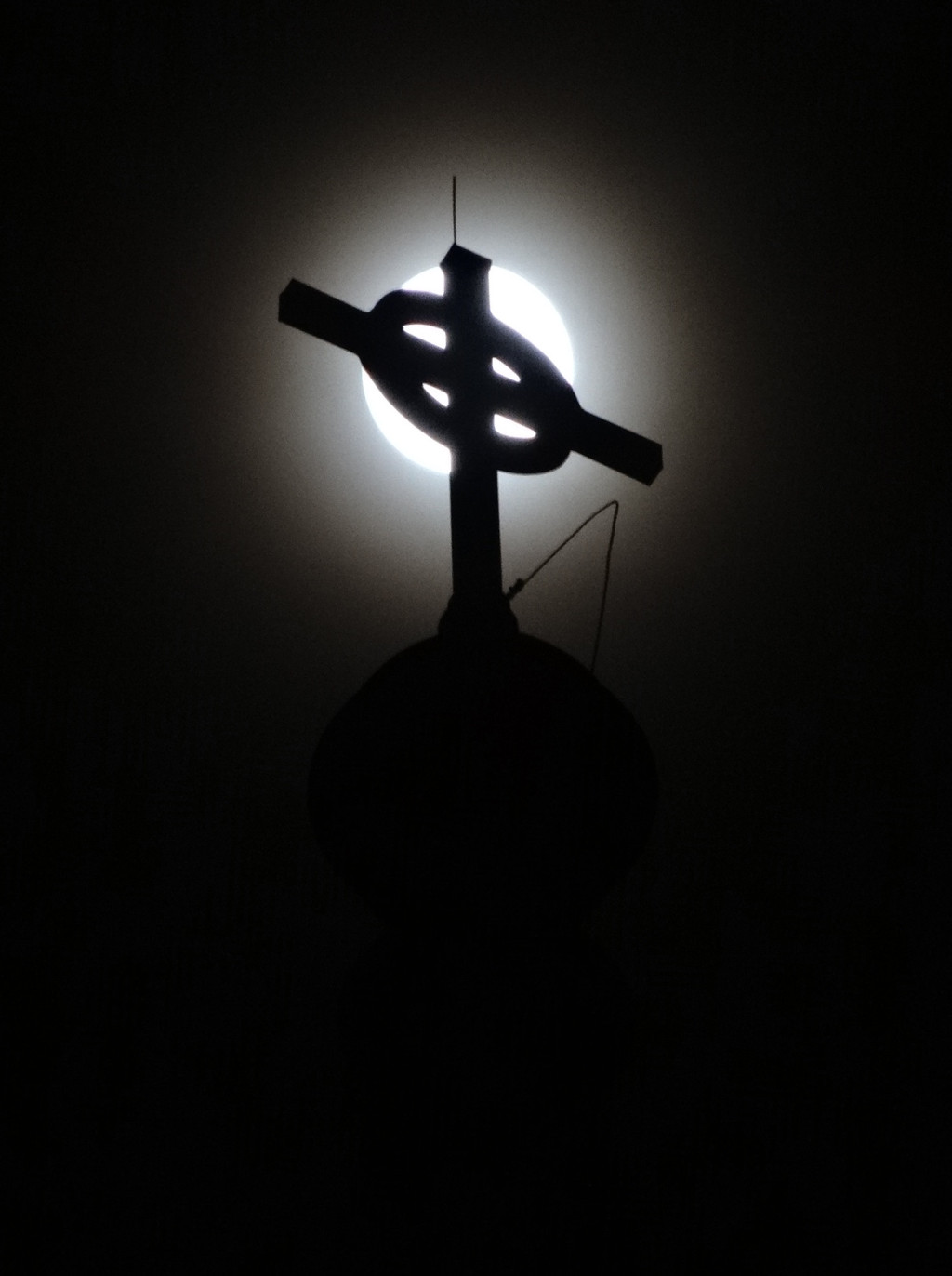
Cross at the top of the spire

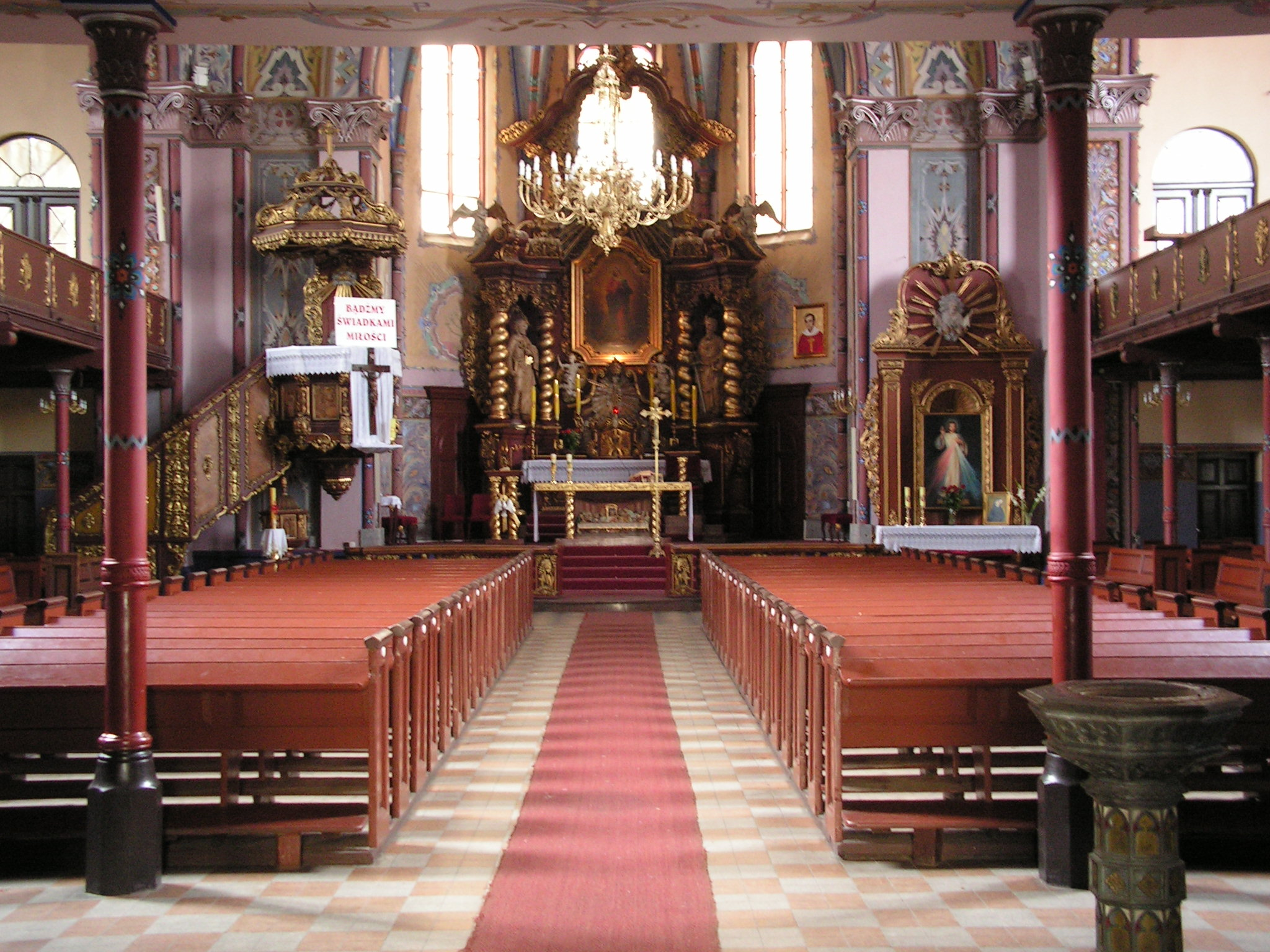
Interior

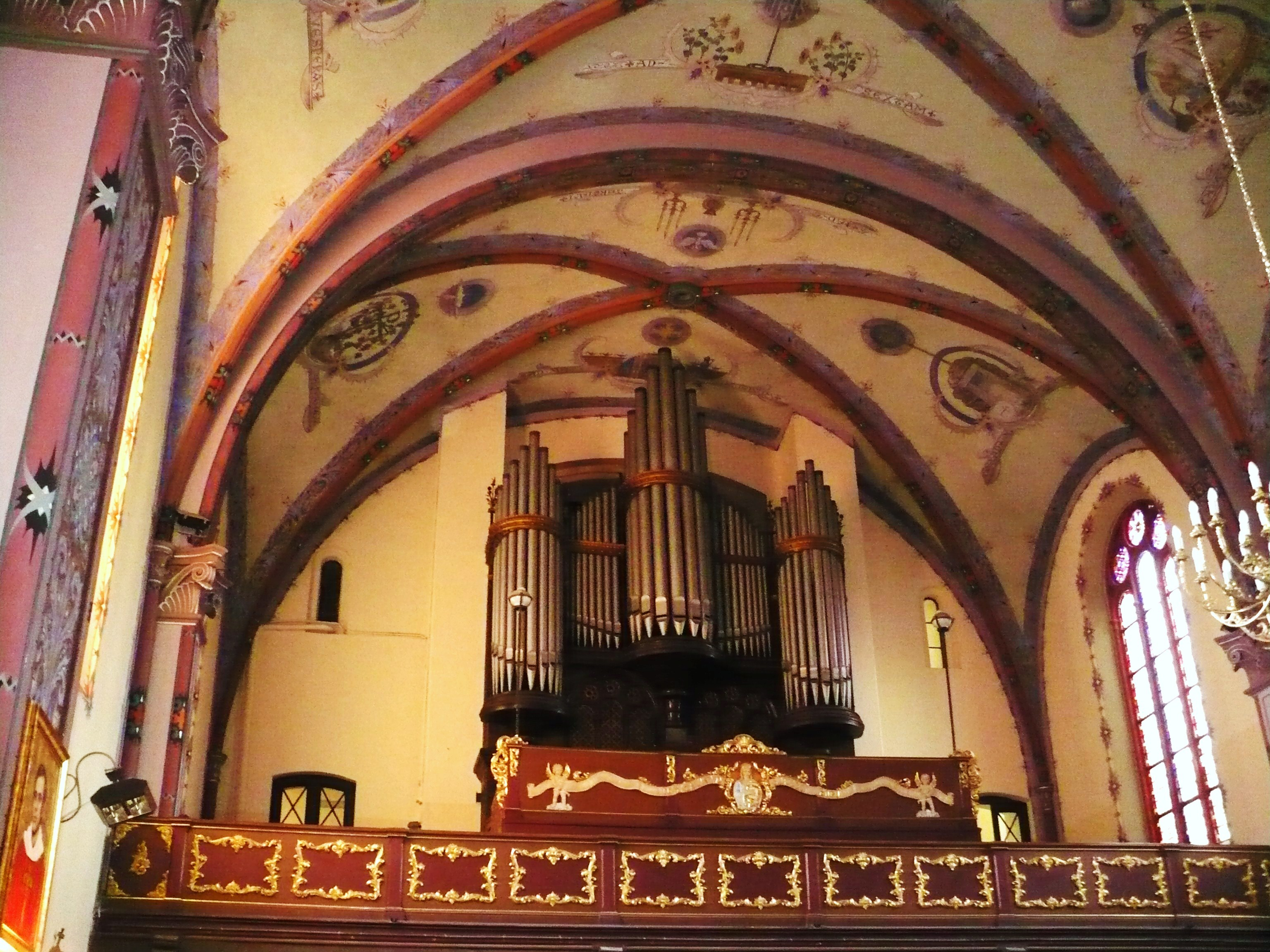
Organ

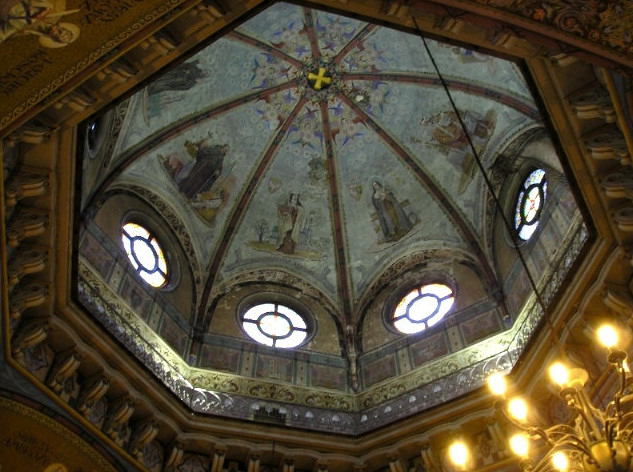
Dome and polychrome

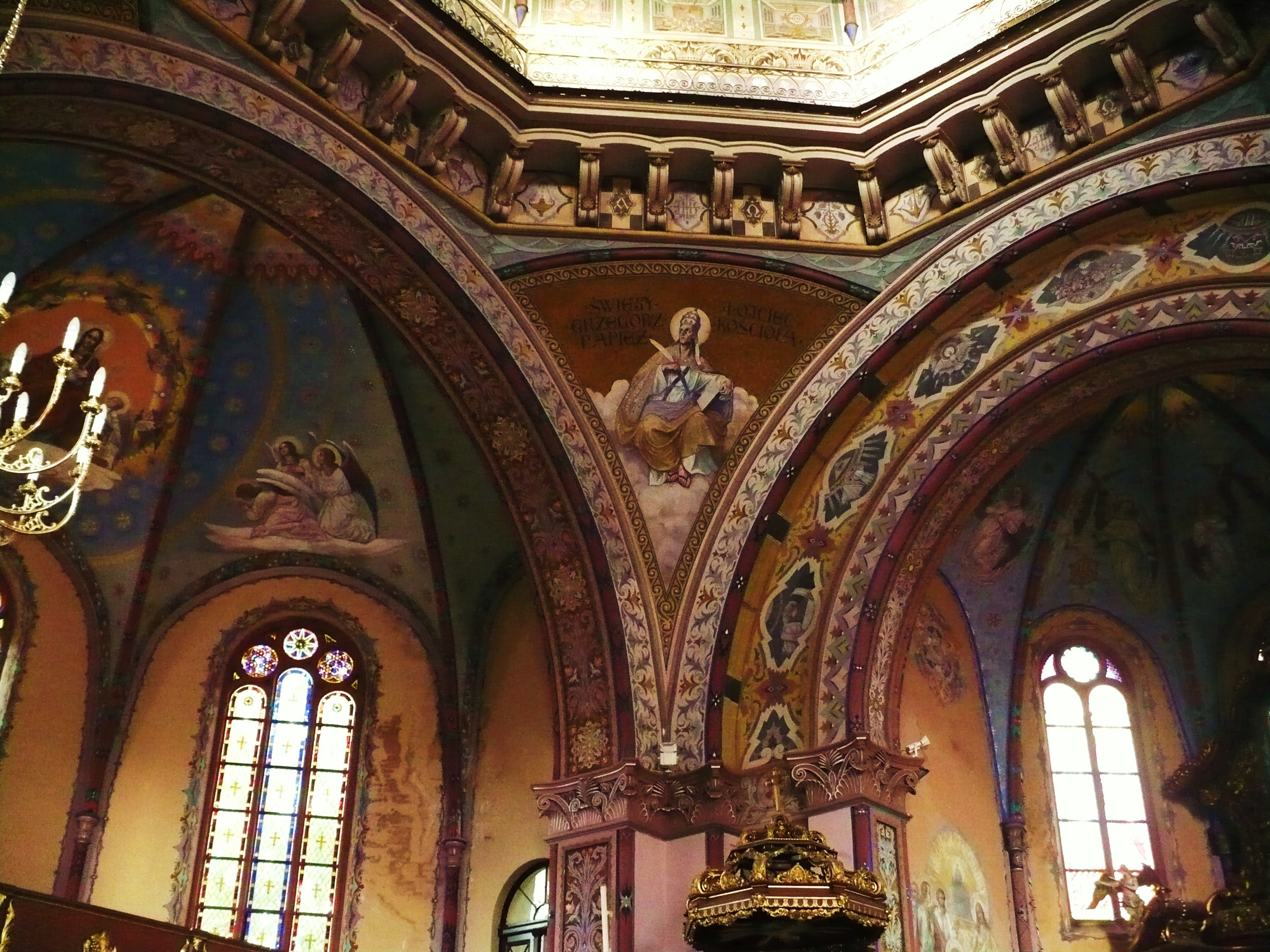
Polychrome

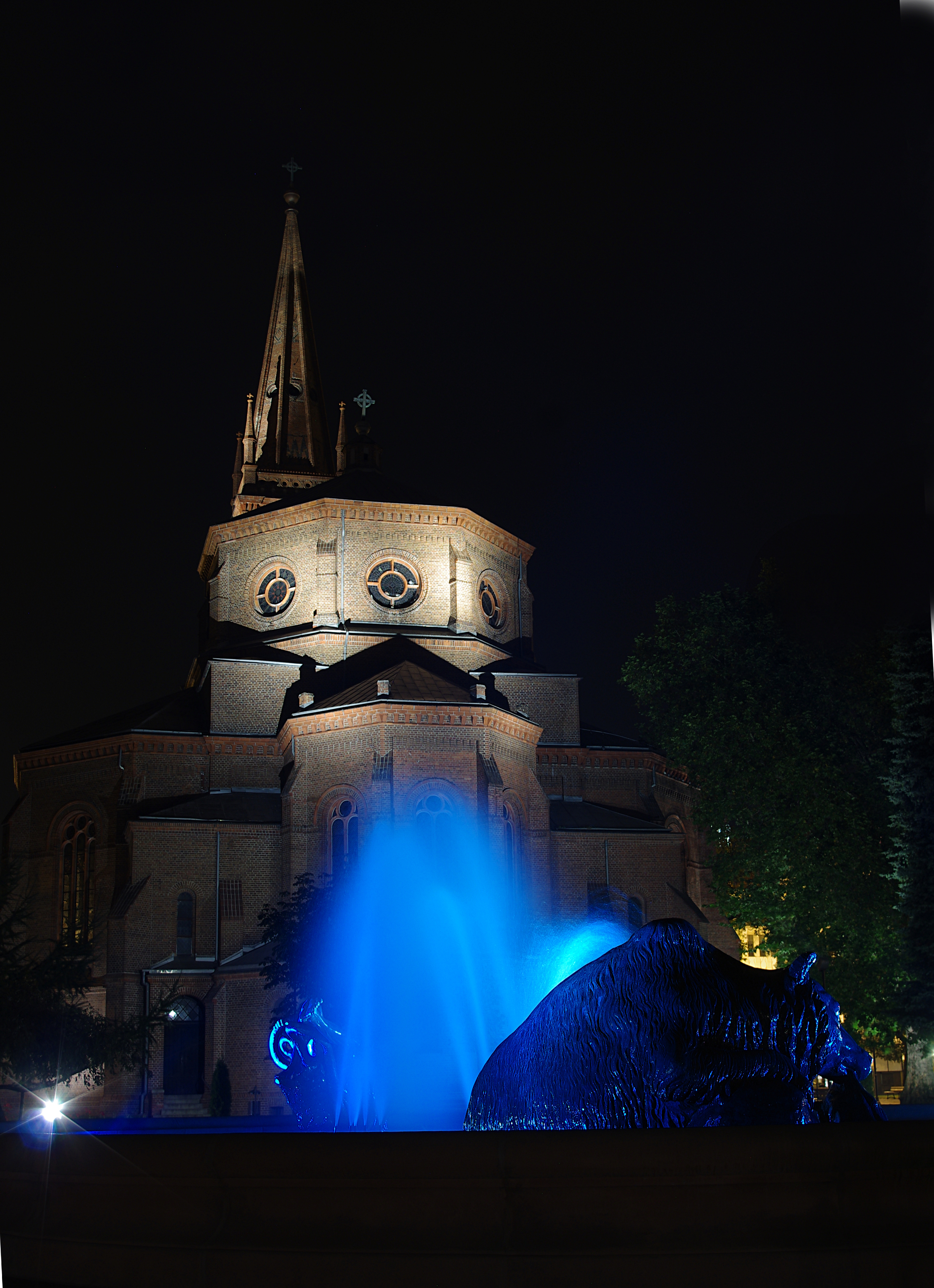
By night with the fountain

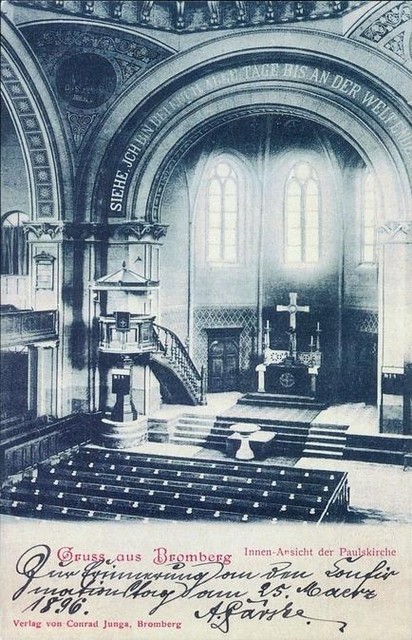
Old Postcard, interiors, c. 1900

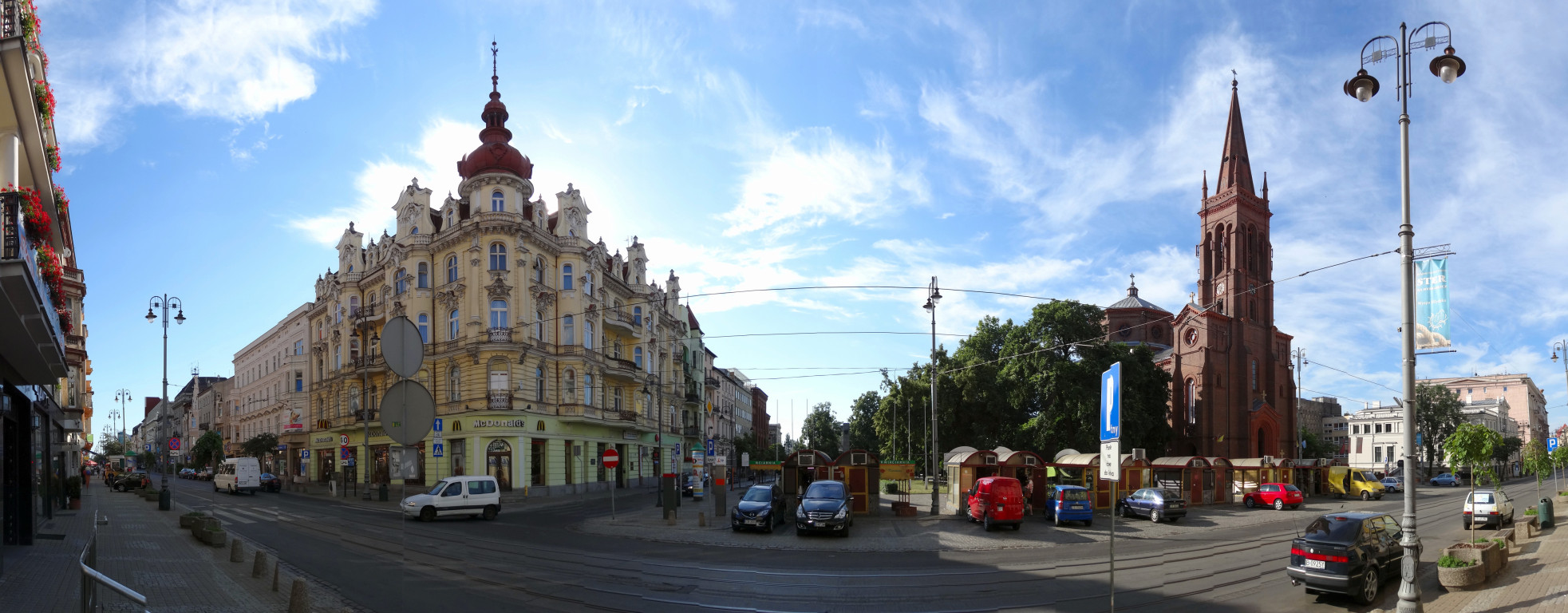
Panorama on Freedom Square with the church on the right

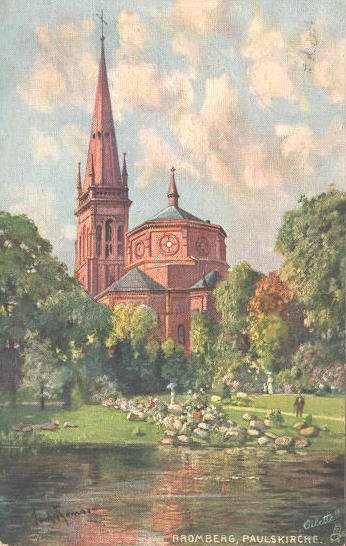
St Peter and St Paul Church, old postcard

== See also ==
- Bydgoszcz
- Freedom Square in Bydgoszcz
- Gdańska Street, Bydgoszcz
- Casimir the Great Park
- Freedom Monument, Bydgoszcz
- Tenement at Freedom Square 1, Bydgoszcz

== Bibliography ==
- (in Polish) Derenda, Jerzy (2006). Piękna stara Bydgoszcz, t. I z serii Bydgoszcz, miasto na Kujawach. Bydgoszcz: warzystwo Miłośników Miasta Bydgoszczy.
- (in Polish) Kaczmarczyk, Henryk (1997). Parafia pw. Św. Apostołów Piotra i Pawła. Kalendarz Bydgoski. Bydgoszcz: Towarzystwo Miłośników Miasta Bydgoszczy. pp. 180–182.
- (in Polish) Kuberska, Inga (1998). Architektura sakralna Bydgoszczy w okresie historyzmu. Materiały do dziejów kultury i sztuki Bydgoszczy i regionu, z. 3. Bydgoszcz: Pracownia Dokumentacji i Popularyzacji Zabytków Wojewódzkiego Ośrodka Kultury w Bydgoszczy. pp. 61–82.
- (in Polish) Parucka, Krystyna (2008). Zabytki Bydgoszczy – minikatalog. Bydgoszcz: „Tifen” Krystyna Parucka. ISBN 9788392719106.
- (in Polish) Rogalski, Bogumił (1991). Architektura sakralna Bydgoszczy dawniej i dziś. Kronika Bydgoska XII. Bydgoszcz: Towarzystwo Miłosnikow Miasta Bydgoszczy - Bydgoskie Towarzystwo Naukowe. pp. 51–77.
