= Freedom Monument (Bydgoszcz) =

Monument in Bydgoszcz, Poland

- Polish: Pomnik Wolności
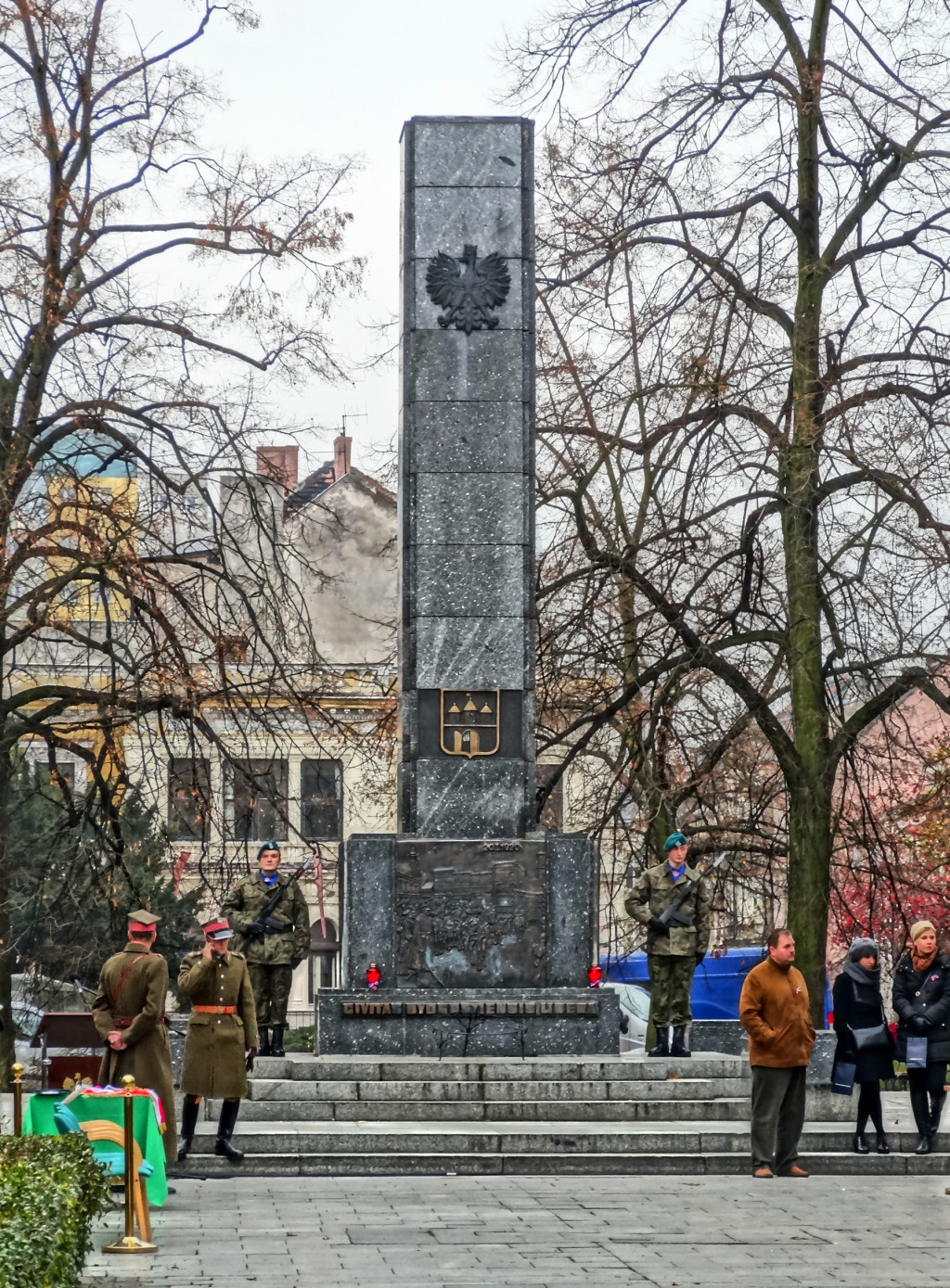
- Freedom Monument in Bydgoszcz
- Interactive map of Freedom Monument
- Location: Bydgoszcz, Poland
- Coordinates: 53.1269°N 18.0050°E
- Designer: Jan Kossowski
- Type: obelisk
- Completion date: 7/11/1945 then 10/11/1945
- Dedicated to: Winning Armies in 1945 and Bydgoszcz return to National Territory
- Dismantled date: July 2026

The Freedom Monument (Polish: Pomnik Wolności) was a monument standing in downtown Bydgoszcz, commemorating both the fallen Soviet and Polish soldiers who fought during the liberation of the city in January 1945, and the return of Bydgoszcz to Poland on 20 January 1920. It has been demolished in July 2026.

The monument had a shape of an obelisk. Its pedestal bore a plaque with the inscription: "'Libera Civitas Bydgostiensis'" (City of Bydgoszcz Free). The front wall of the monument had reliefs and plaques, and on other walls, among others, stood tombstones commemorating eleven Soviet soldiers killed.

== History ==
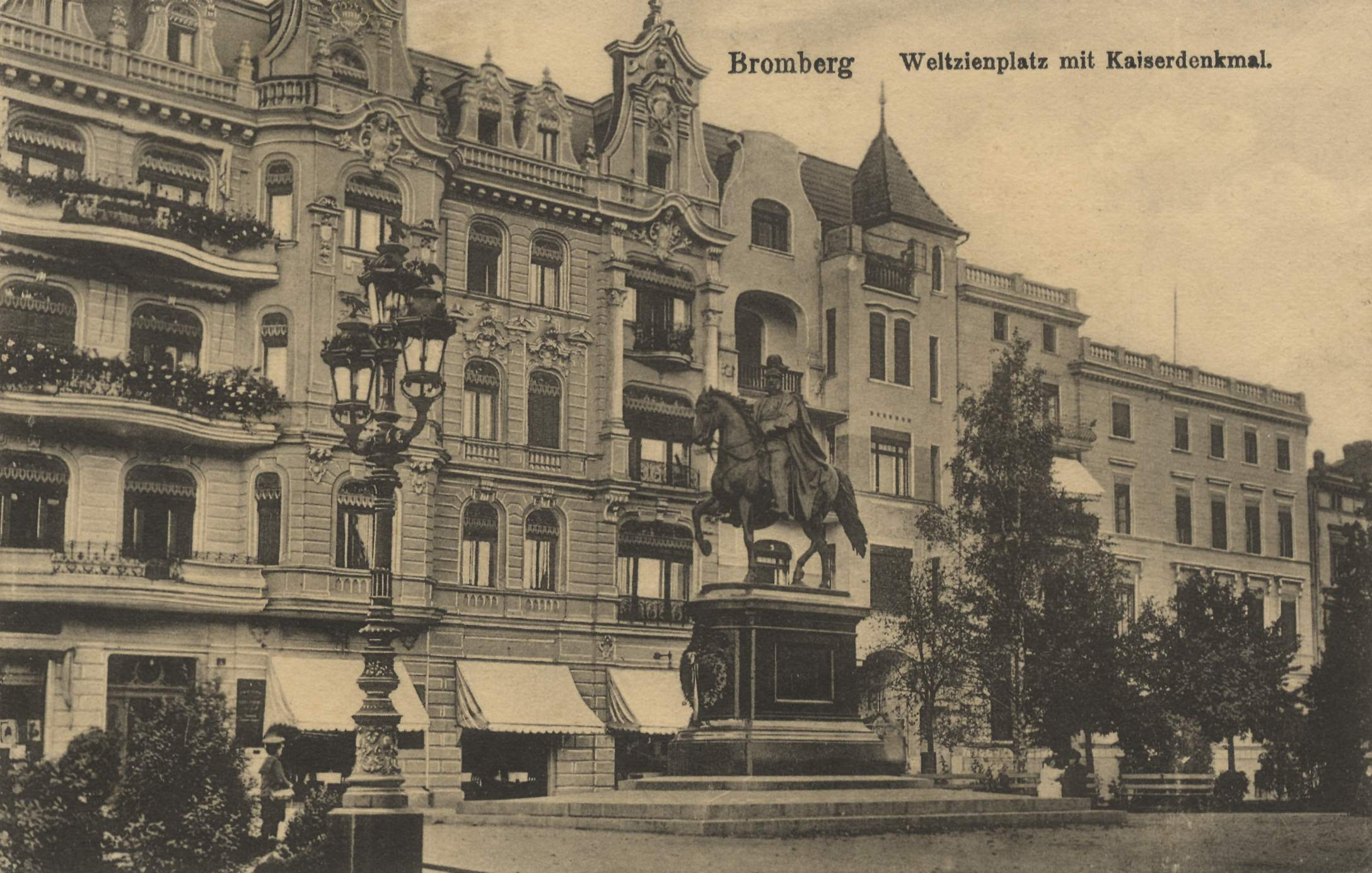
Statue of William I, German Emperor on an old postcard

Shortly after Nazis withdrew from Bydgoszcz in January 1945, corpses of soldiers killed in the fighting for the city needed a place to be buried. Those men from the Red Army were led by colonel Grigorij Bolszanin. The place of the burial was located near the spot where until 1919 stood the statue of Emperor William I on his horse.

Initially a earthen mound covered the tombstone. In due course, the then Interim Municipal Government decided to celebrate here the memory of all Red Army and Polish Army soldiers who died in the battles for the liberation of Bydgoszcz. Thus in spring of 1945, a committee for the construction of the monument was conveyed, chaired by the president of the city, Witold Szukszta. The first draft of the project was presented on 14 April 1945: the work was commissioned to the architect Jan Kossowski, who realized a simple, soaring obelisk, showing the "Slavs triumph over Germany".

The monument, called "Monument of Gratitude to Soldiers of the Red Army" was unveiled on 7 November 1945. It was dedicated to honor the soldiers of the Red Army who died during the liberation of the city and the surrounding area in January 1945. On the obelisk on the front pedestal was placed a plaque with the emblem of the city. The inscription, both in Polish and Russian, used to inform about the incident. In front of the monument was a tombstone with the names of Soviet officers who were killed in 1945 and buried in this spot. The obelisk was then considered as temporary, waiting to be replaced by the construction of a more worthy monument.

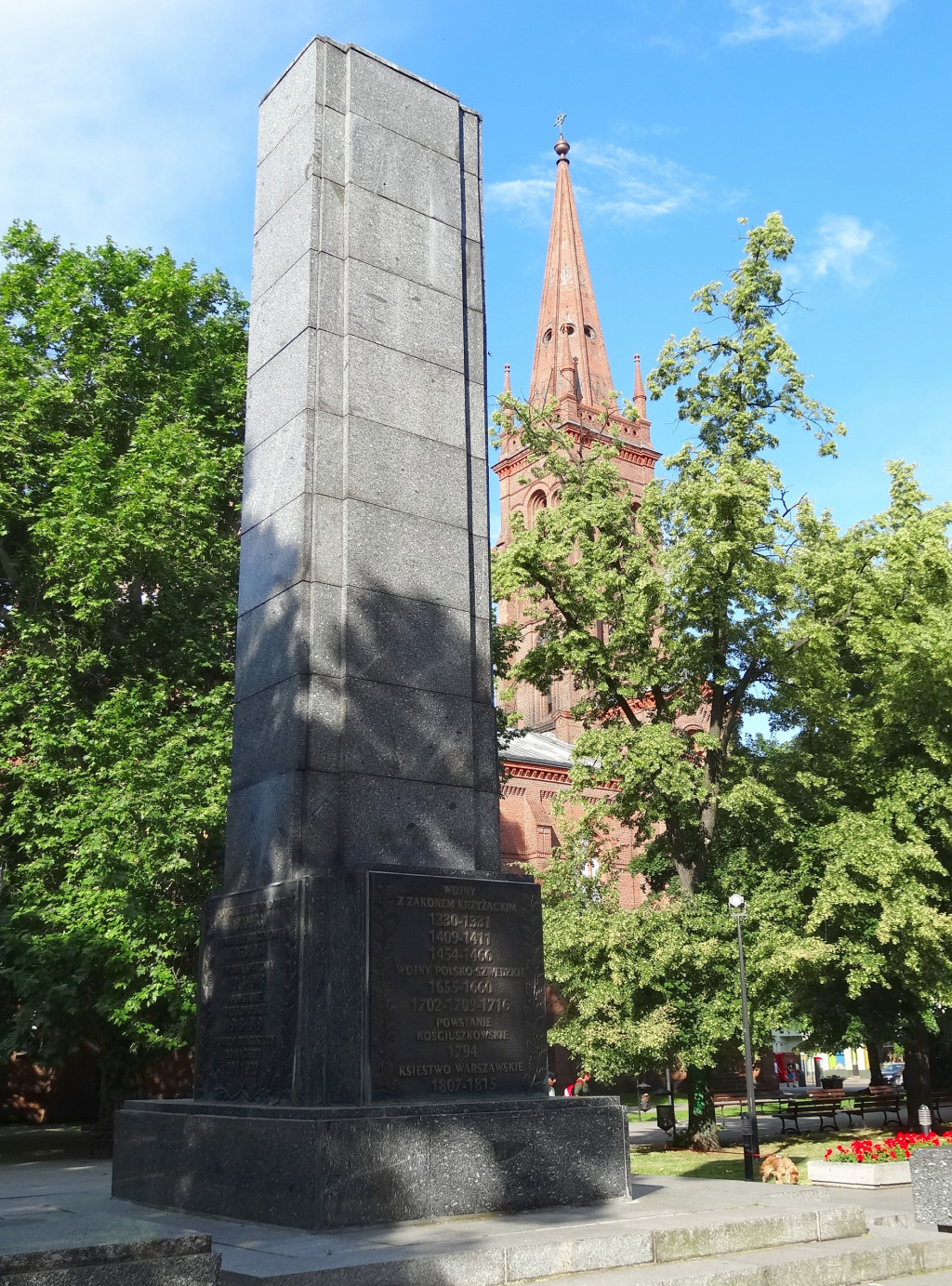
Monument with St Peter St Paul church in the background

In September 1948, Municipal authorities established the "Civic Committee for the Construction of the Monument of Gratitude to the Red Army". The competition aiming at designing the new monument was held at national level, and the date of its unveiling already scheduled for 1 May 1949. The costs were supposed to be covered by collecting public money. Four locations were foreseen:

- Theatre Square;
- Jan Kochanowski Park;
- intersection between Jagiellońska and Bernardyńska streets;
- Freedom Square, which was eventually chosen.

Despite the strenuous efforts of municipal authorities, the project failed to succeed, owing to a myriad of issues, among which:

- collections on the streets, in offices, and institutions, as well as taxes collected during the events organized in the city hardly raised enough funds;
- the selection of the project (the competition received 14 proposals) dragged on till a winner was nominated (professor Marian Wnuk from the Academy of Fine Arts in Gdańsk);
- the choice of the location made the soviet-aligned authorities raised an eyebrow, since the selected spot displayed in its background two churches (St Peter St Paul church on Freedom Square and Cathedral on Theatre Square), making it a sensitive issue to colocate laic and religious buildings.

Another attempt was made in January 1955. This time the location of the future monument was moved to Theater Square wehere the disturbing backderop of Bydgoszcz Cathedral was obscured by double row of tall trees. The costs of the project were to come from public funding. Professor Marian Wnuk was still in charge: his design represented a 4-meter-tall statue surrendering to a Red Army soldier in flapping overcoat, holding a Soviet submachine gun made of sandstone. The whole scene was envisioned to possess a large concrete foundation with steps to giving access to the base. Although the project was funded, with a scheduled date for an official unveiling on 22 July 1956, the monument was finally not realized. Indeed, Poland underwent at that period the so-called Polish thaw, which brought a wind of reform led by Władysław Gomułka: mindsets were no longer in favour of such realizations. In addition, the political protests that soon followed decreased even more the enthusiasm not only of the society, but also the municipalities and state will.

Other sculptures or proposals have been since abandoned and postponed indefinitely.

As a result, the "Monument in honor of the soldiers of the Red Army in Bydgoszcz" had remained under the shape of a 1945 simple obelisk till its demise.

=== Freedom Monument ===
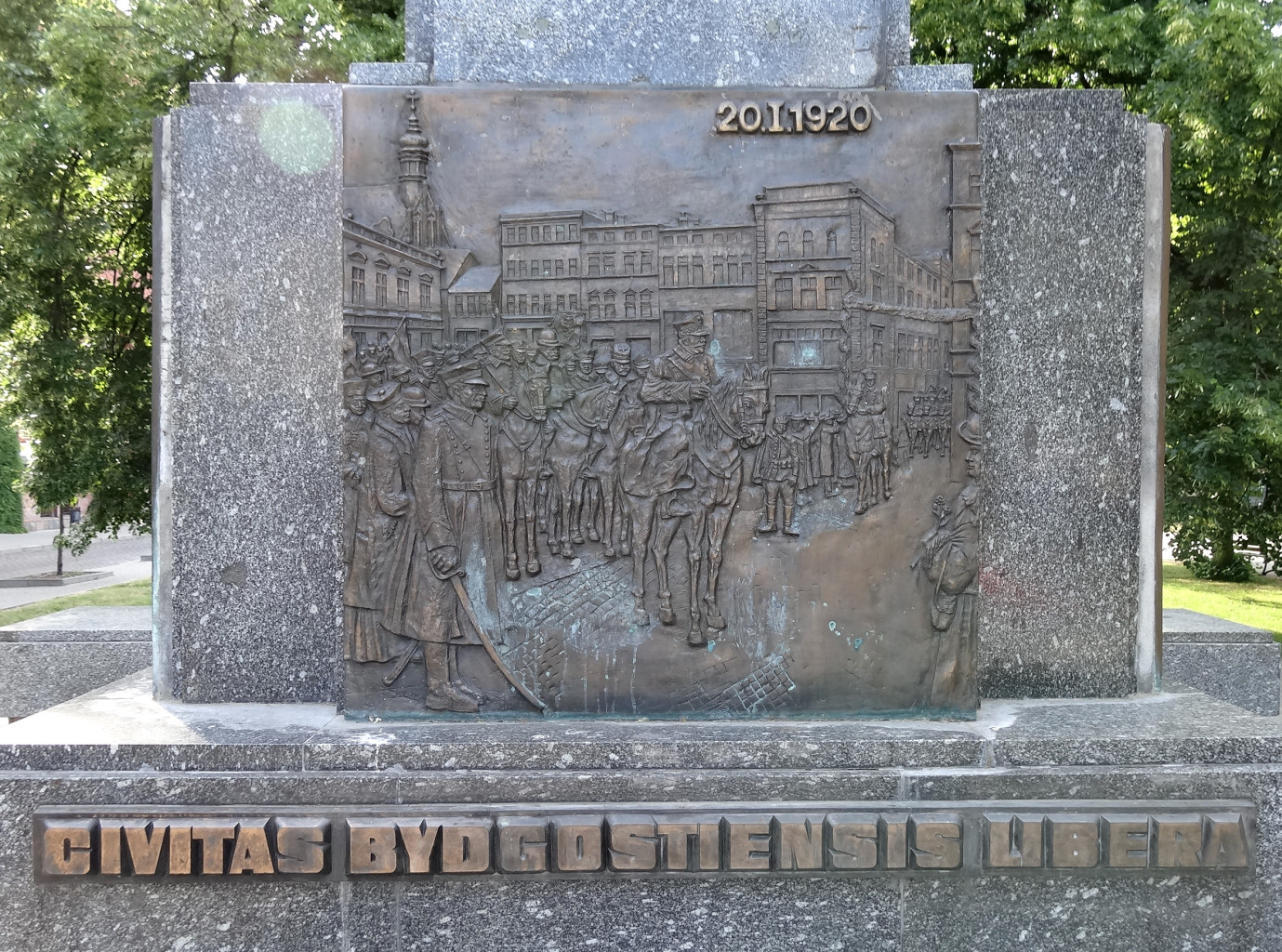
West relief commemorating 20/01/1920 greeting

The end of communist rule in 1989 caused a review to the grounds upon which the monument was initially built. At the request of the inhabitants of the city, in 1990, Bydgoszcz City Council passed a resolution to rename the Monument of Gratitude to Freedom Monument. Some reliefs were changed and gradually additional ones were added. The unveiling and new dedication of the rebuilt monument took place on 10 November 1991.

In 1994, following the recommendations of the City Council, a relief of bronze was placed on the front wall of the monument, commemorating the return of Bydgoszcz to the Polish state on 20 January 1920. The scene portrayed the greeting to the troops of the Polish Army entering the city on the Old Market square in Bydgoszcz.

The bas-relief was the work of Polish sculptor Alexander Dętkoś. In 1995, on the left side of the monument (facing the street) plaques realized by the same artist were put, detailing dates of important events in Bydgoszcz history. The tombstone placed on the grave of the 11 Soviet soldiers killed in 1945, remained untouched.

=== Dismantlement of the monument ===
With time, the current state of preservation of the monument's cladding deteriorated and city authorities had difficulties to clearly determine the solidity of the bound between the granite slabs and the obelisk's supporting structure. A decision was taken in May 2025 to include the monument demolition in the overall project of revitalization of the square. A competition for the erection of a new monument is planned to start during the third quarter of 2026.

== Gallery ==
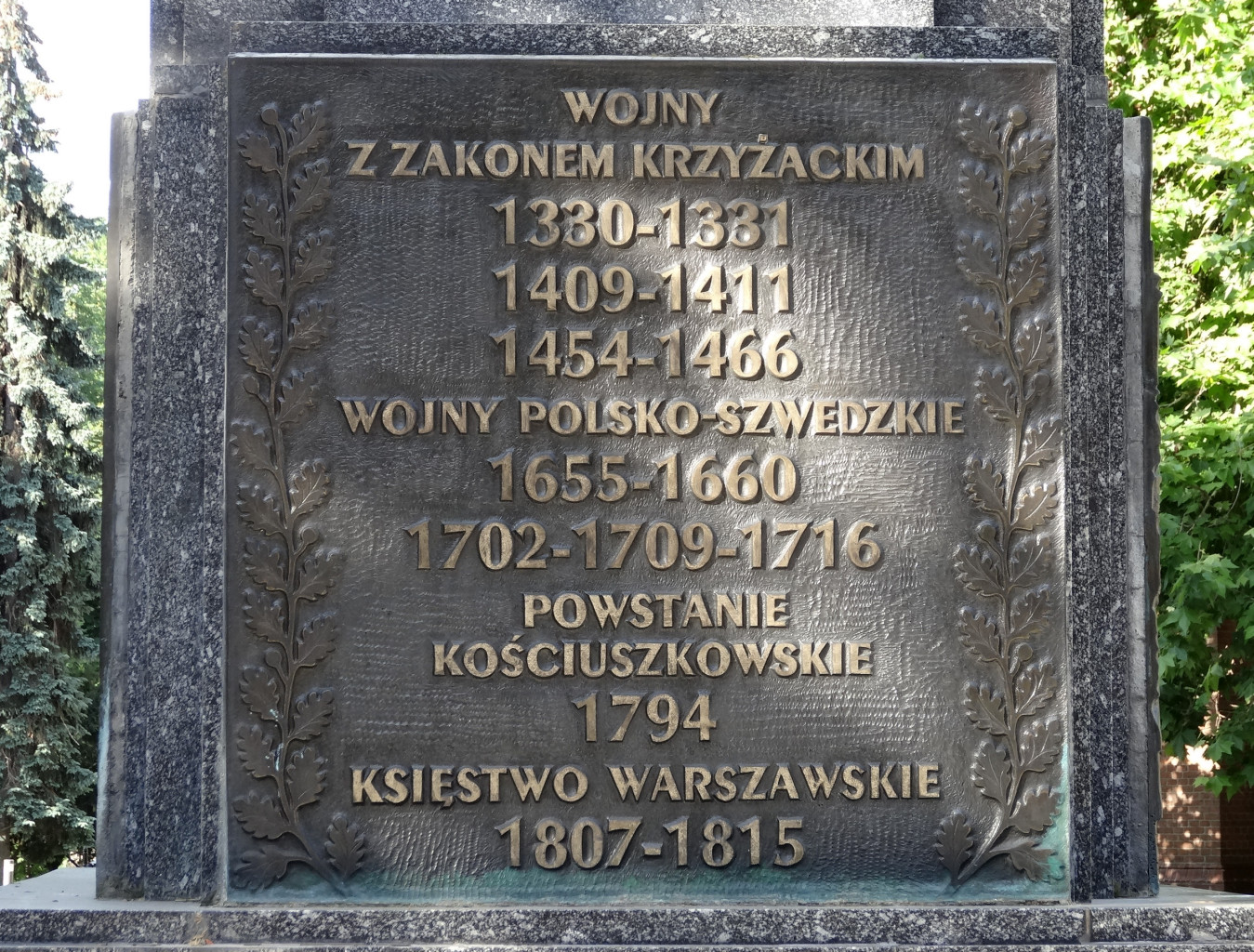
North plaque with Bydgoszcz main dates

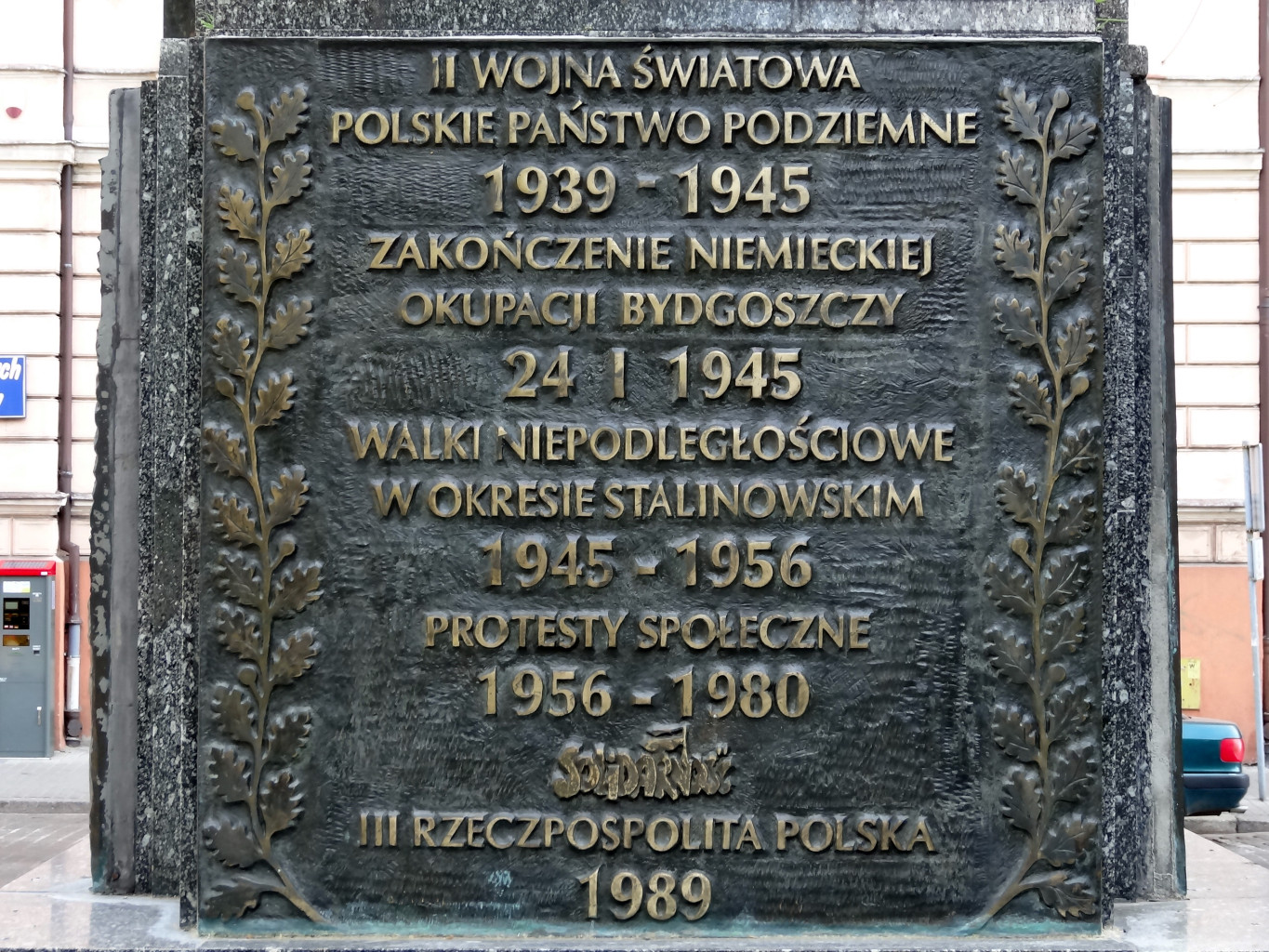
South plaque with Bydgoszcz main dates

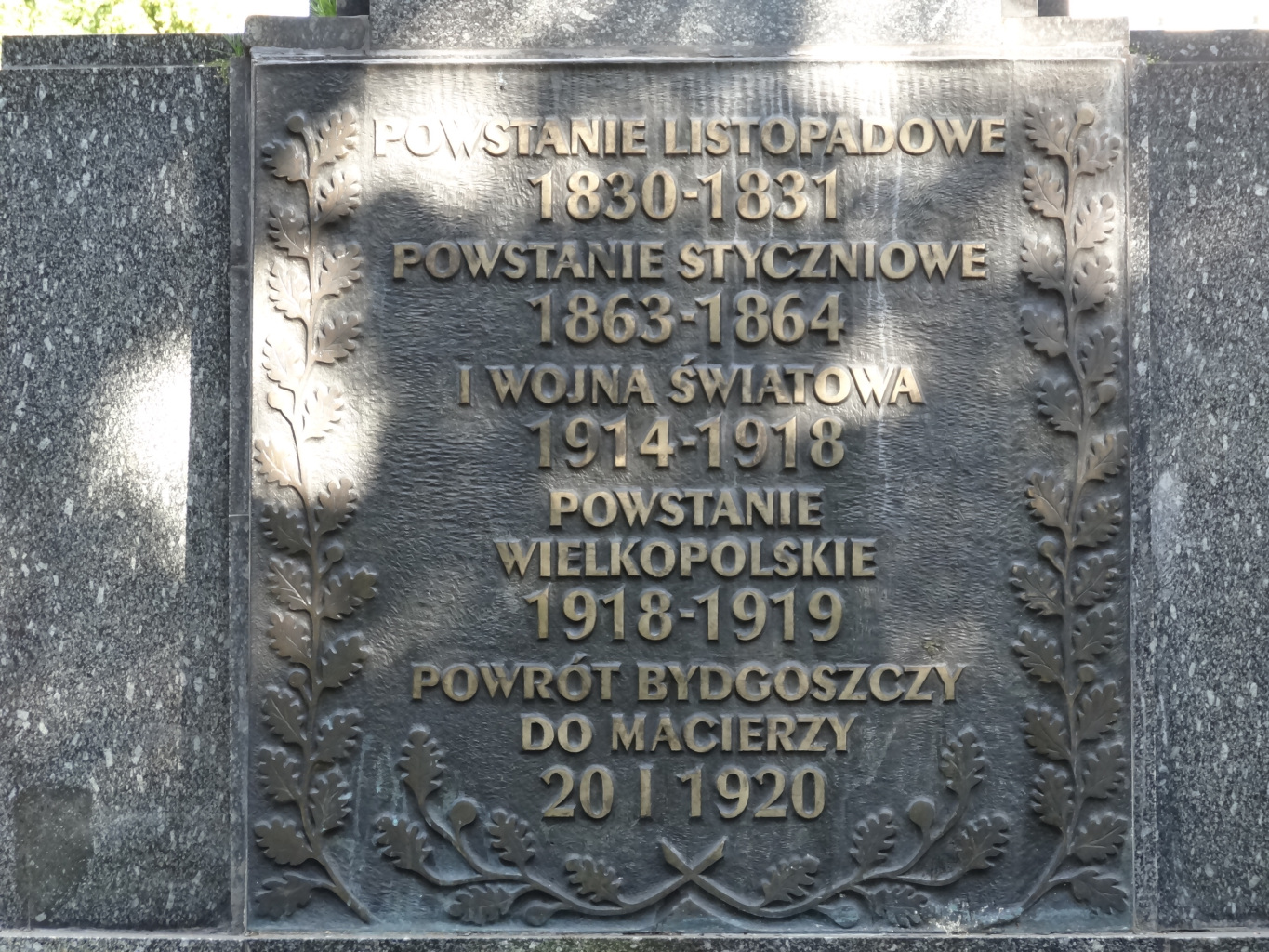
East plaque with Bydgoszcz main dates

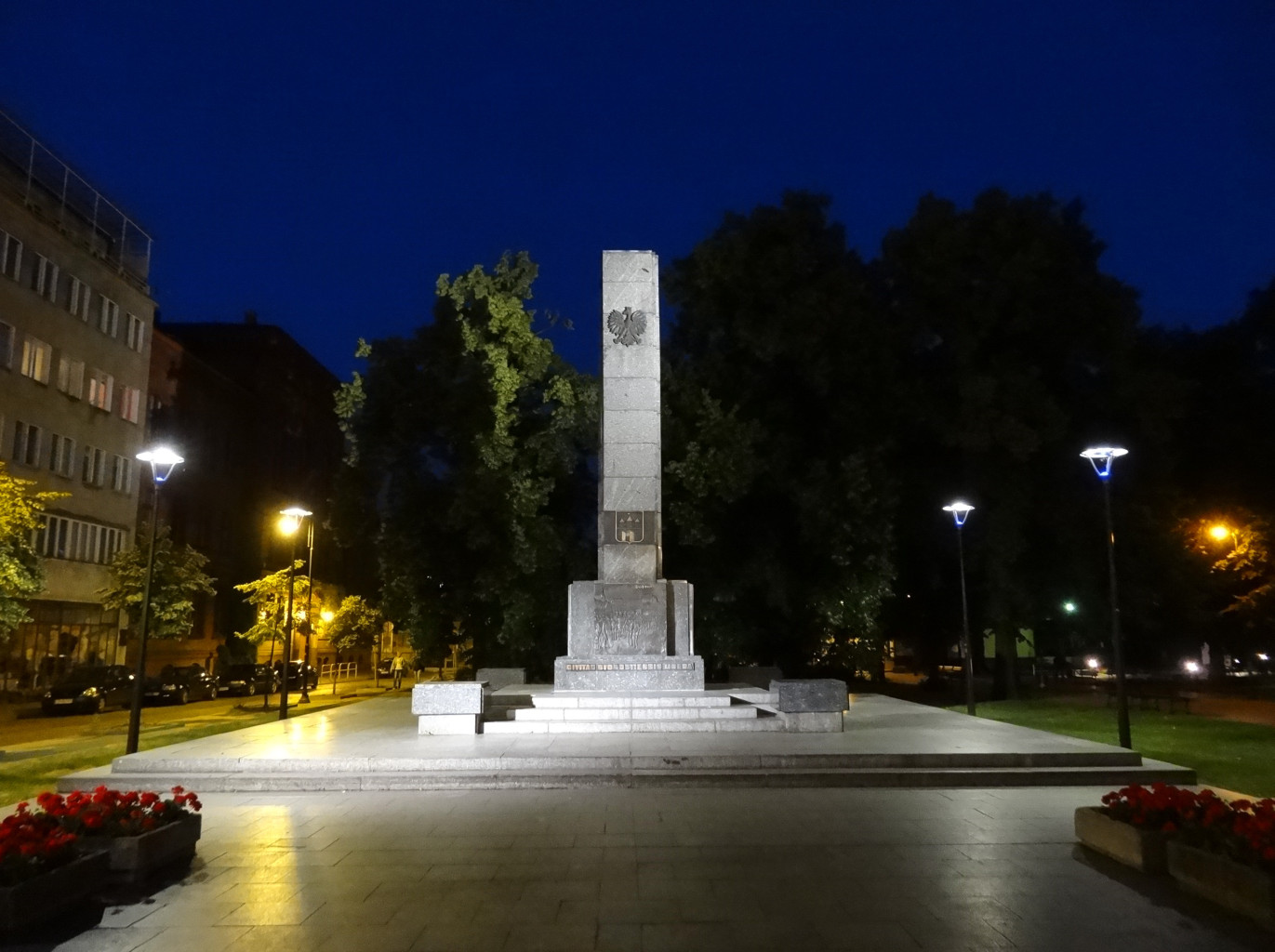
By night

== See also ==
- Bydgoszcz
- Freedom Square in Bydgoszcz
- Gdańska Street, Bydgoszcz
- St Peter's and St Paul's Church, Bydgoszcz
- Casimir the Great Park
- Tenement at Freedom Square 1, Bydgoszcz
- (in Polish) Monuments and sculptures in Bydgoszcz
- (in Polish) Monument to Wilhelm I in Bydgoszcz

== Bibliography ==
- (in Polish) Gliwiński, Eugeniusz (1997). Bydgoskie pomniki naszych czasów cz. 1. Kalendarz Bydgoski [Bydgoszcz Monuments of Our Times Part 1. Bydgoszcz Calendar] (in Polish). Bydgoszcz: Towarzystwo Miłośników Miasta Bydgoszczy. pp. 94–100.
- (in Polish) Błażejewski, Krzysztof (2007). Niewdzięczni bydgoszczanie. Kalendarz Bydgoski [Ungrateful Bydgoszcz residents. Bydgoszcz Calendar] (in Polish). Bydgoszcz: Towarzystwo Miłośników Miasta Bydgoszczy. pp. 210–213.
