= Freedom Square 1, Bydgoszcz =

Building at 1 Freedom Square, Bydgoszcz
- Polish: Kamienica na placu Wolności 1 w Bydgoszczy
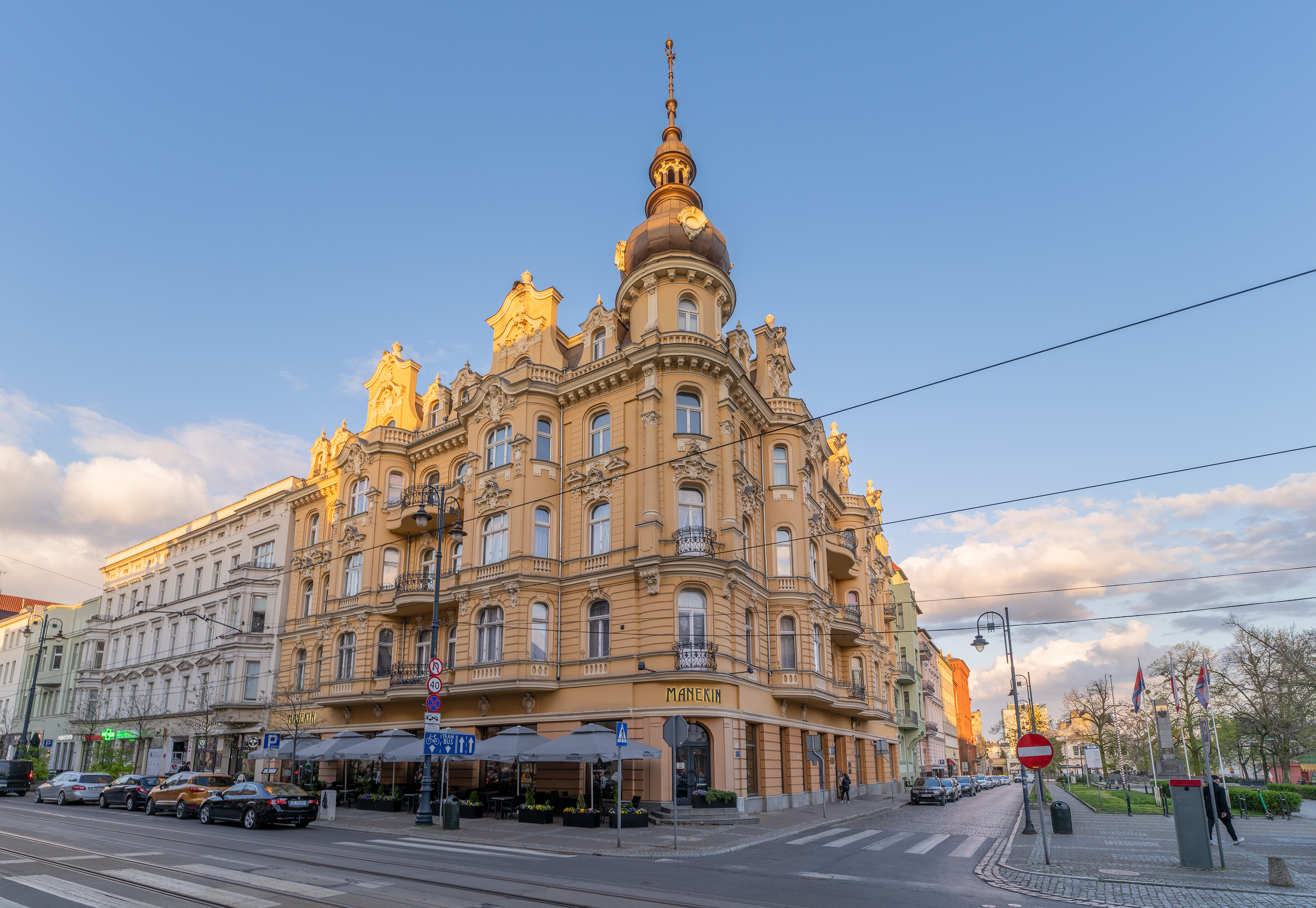
- Tenement at 1 Freedom Square
- Interactive map of the Building at 1 Freedom Square, Bydgoszcz area

General information
- Type: Tenement
- Architectural style: Eclecticism, Neo-baroque
- Classification: Nr.601429-Reg.A/1041, 20 October 1990
- Location: Bydgoszcz, Poland, 1 Plac Wolności
- Coordinates: 53°7′38″N 18°00′19″E
- Construction started: 1896
- Completed: 1898

Design and construction
- Architect: Józef Święcicki

Tenement Freedom Square 1 is an historic house of Bydgoszcz. It is often displayed on postcards as one of the turn of the century iconic building in Bydgoszcz. The architect, Józef Święcicki, is also the builder of the "Pod Orłem" hotel (Under the Eagle), the oldest hotel in downtown Bydgoszcz. The building is located on the east side of Gdańska Street, on the corner of Plac Wolności.

== History ==
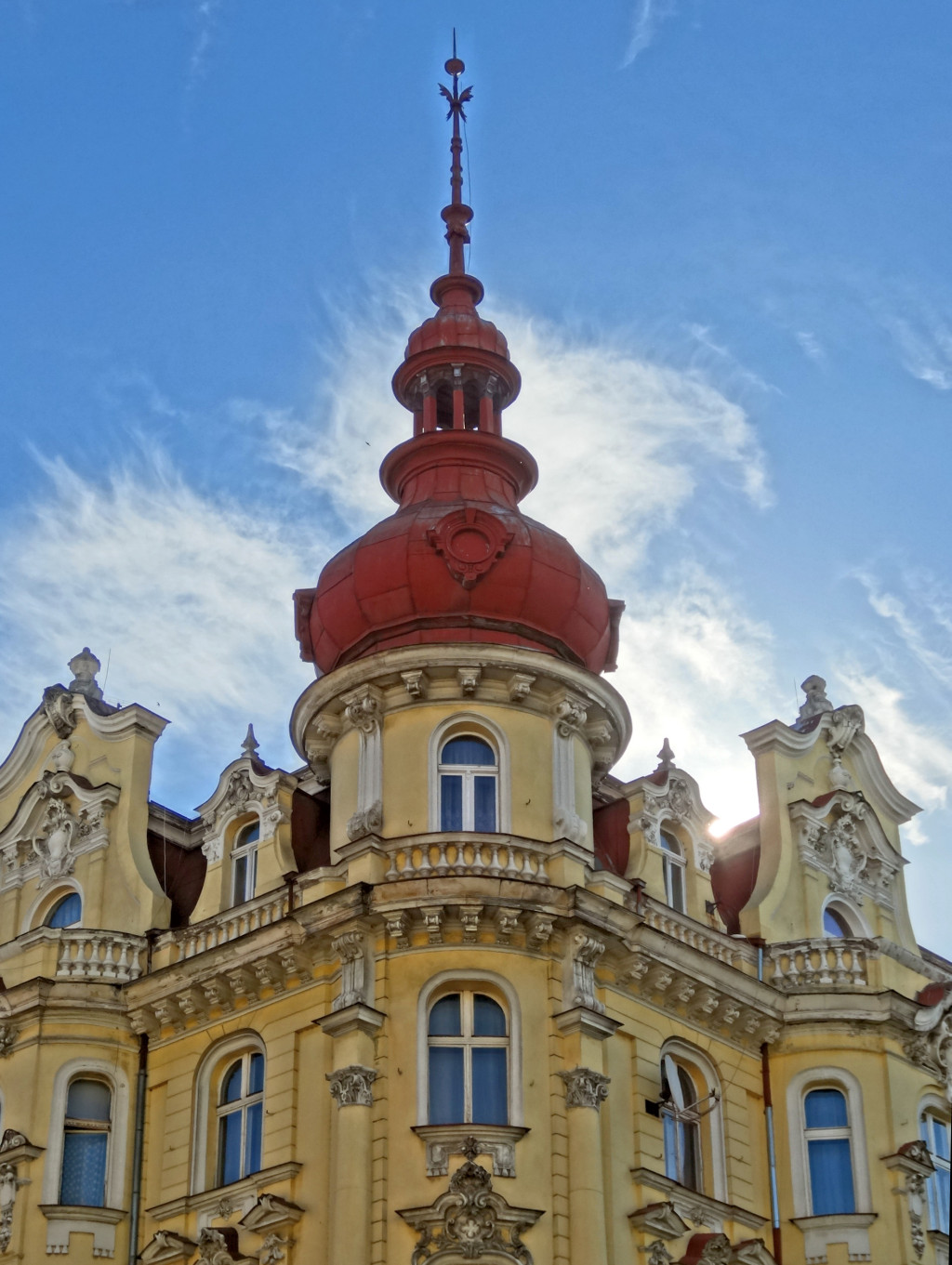
Detail of the corner tower

The piece of land on which the house stands was already built in 1850. The building facing Gdańska Street was devoted to residential purposes, whereas the one giving onto Plac Wolności was used for business purposes.

From 1855 to 1876, the property belonged to the widow of Fryderyki Götz, a teacher, then to another teacher, Carl Wolff; in 1895, his son, Captain Ernst Wolff, inherited the building. The new owner sold part of the property (at 5 Plac Wolności), and raised funds for the construction of a new, stately townhouse corner. Its designer, Bydgoszcz builder Józef Święcicki, gave to the new tenement the characteristics of an urban and commercial building.

Construction started in October 1896, and the reception happened on January 28, 1898. Local companies were employed, such as master bricklayer Hermann Lewandowski, master roofer Julius Jakoby, carpenter Menning. The ground floor was devoted to shops and restaurants, while the upper ones displayed for luxury apartments. In 1898, the first electric lift in the city was installed in the building, imported from Berlin. The corner location of the building enabled its symmetrical shape, the symmetry axis being underlined by a tower covered ending in a bulbous dome.

Ernst Wolff was the owner of the building until 1916, then his widow Martha Wolff until 1919. At this time, the property included Carl Brasch's photography workshop, as well as two restaurants, "Kaiser-Cafe" and "Falstaff 2", and various other shops. Flats tenants were well-known traders, industrialists, officials and officers, including:

- Friedrich Wilhelm Bumke and Ernst Müller, directors of Żegluga Bydgoska;
- Heinrich Englemann, owner of Fordon steam brickyard;
- Colonel Alexander Kluck, commander of the 34th Pomeranian Regiment of Fusiliers (German: Füsilier-Regiment Königin Viktoria von Schweden (Pomm.) Nr. 34).

In 1919, the building was owned by a merchant, Stanislaw Czarnecki, then in 1922 by Bank Handlowy in Warsaw which used the ground floor to set up its branch office in Bydgoszcz.

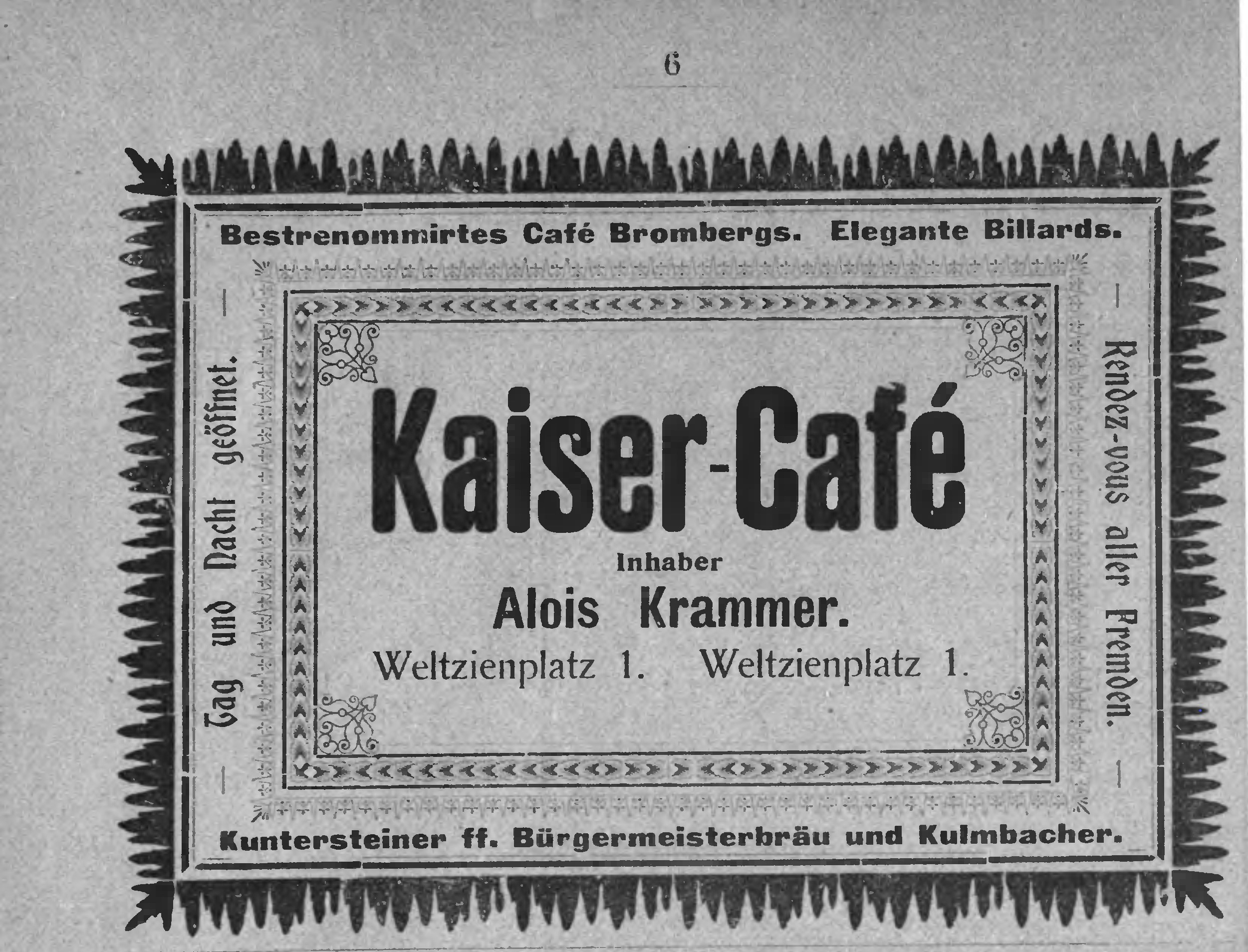
Advertising for the "Kaiser Cafe" in 1900

Between 1929 and 1933, the owner was Romuald Turasiewicz, deputy of Bydgoszcz District Court, then Eugenia Preiss. In 1927, a car dealer was inaugurated, in front of a gas station. The building also housed Wedel's store.

Upon basis of receipts issued in 1939 by the Germans, it was established that Stanislaw Hass, a master confectioner born in Grodzisk Mazowiecki in 1899, was running a café "Cristal" at Nr.1. Stanislaw Hass later owned the restaurant U Hassa at Jezuicka Street 24.

After the entry of Soviet troops in the city, an NKVD office was set up in the building in 1945. To commemorate Poles killed there during the Soviet period, a wall plaque was unveiled in 1993.

After World War II, the building house became the property of the "Administration of Urban Houses" in Bydgoszcz. In 1972, interior renovations were carried out, dividing flats, setting up independent kitchens and bathrooms, and removing the central heating system. During these works, part of the rich interior design, including stucco and decorated stoves were destroyed. In 1992, McDonald's company set up on the ground floor its first restaurant in the city: for this occasion, the building was entirely restored.

In December 2016, ground premises were renovated to house a new restaurant Śródmieście, replacing the fast-food facility.

== Architecture ==
The building has got rich architectural details designed in the Eclectism style with a predominance of Neo-baroque forms Its footprint is rectangular, with an inner courtyard as a well and two wings running along Gdańska Street and Plac Wolności.

The building has three storeys, a cellar and an attic. Facades are richly decorated with pilasters, cartouche motifs and balconies ornamented with baluster railing. Above building cornices, bay windows are topped by gables. The tenement corner is rounded, topped with a tower covered with an onion dome. In the same area, Józef Święcicki also realized many other edifices, among others the Hotel "Pod Orlem" at Gdańska street 14; the Oskar Ewald Tenement at Gdańska street 30; the Józef Święcicki tenement at Gdańska street 63; as well as the Tenement at Gdańska street 86.

The building has been registered on the Pomeranian Heritage List (Nr.601429-Reg.A/1041) on the 20 October 1990.

== Gallery ==
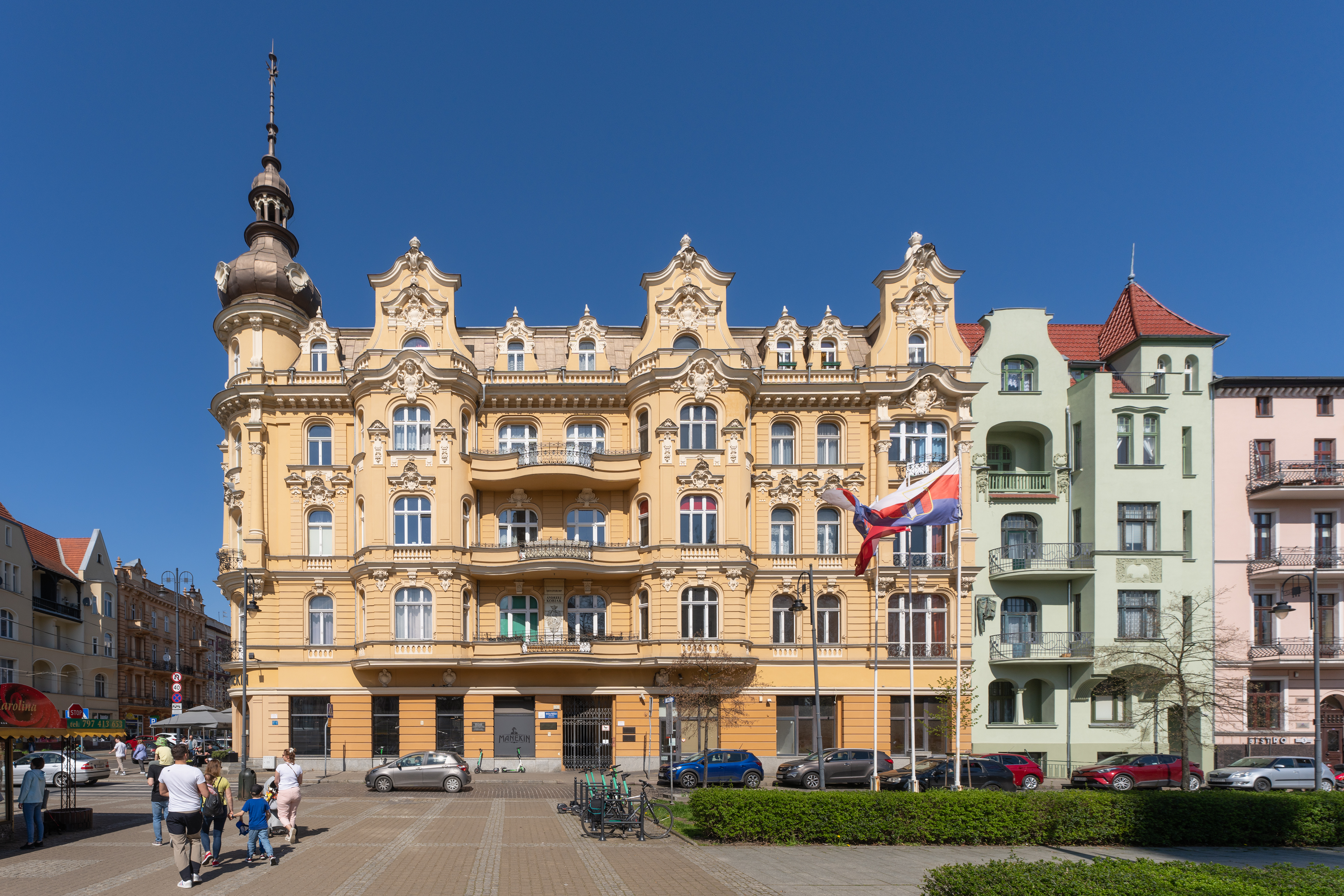
View from Plac Wolności

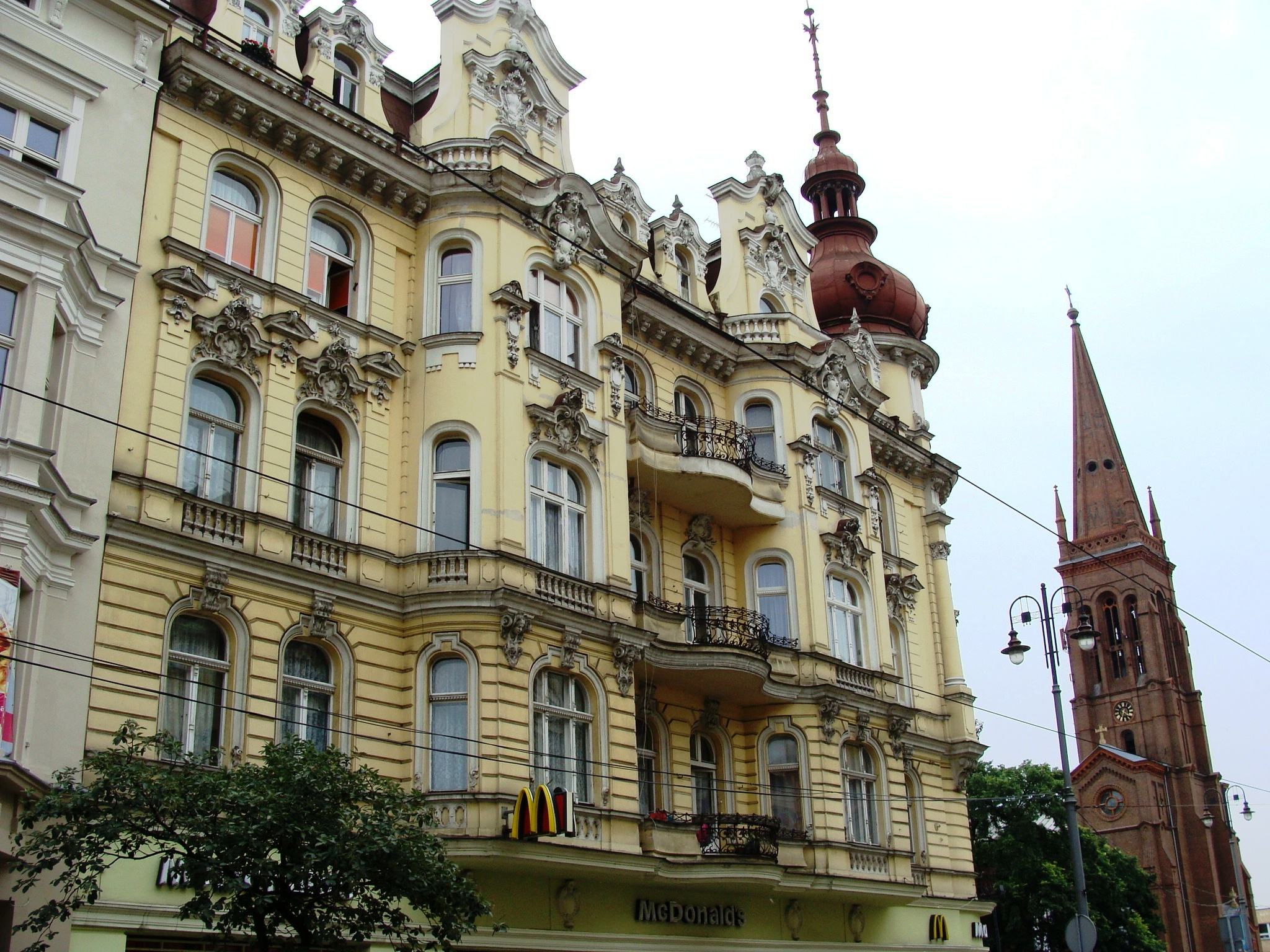
Facade on Gdańska Street

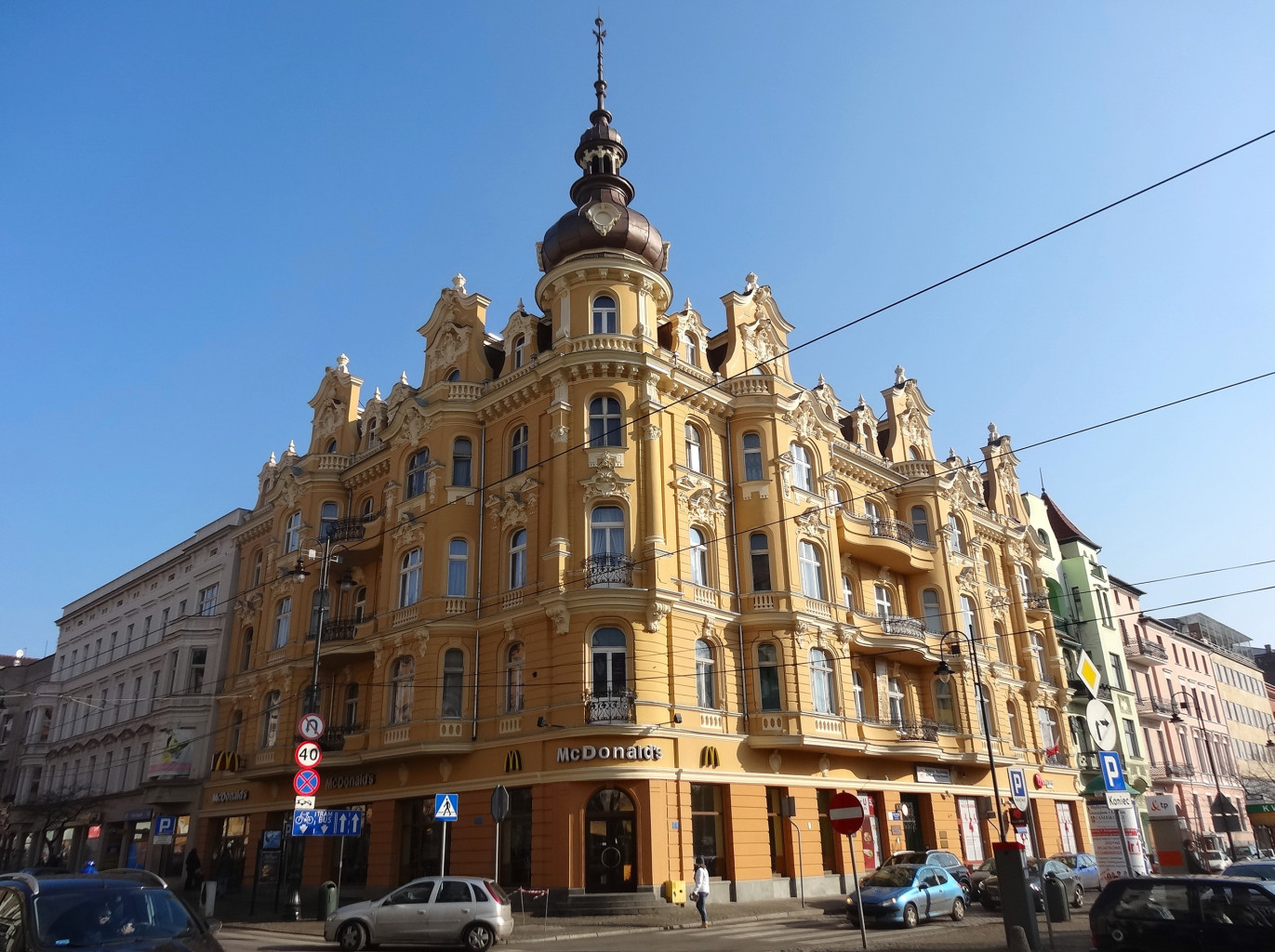
The edifice after a renovation in 2015

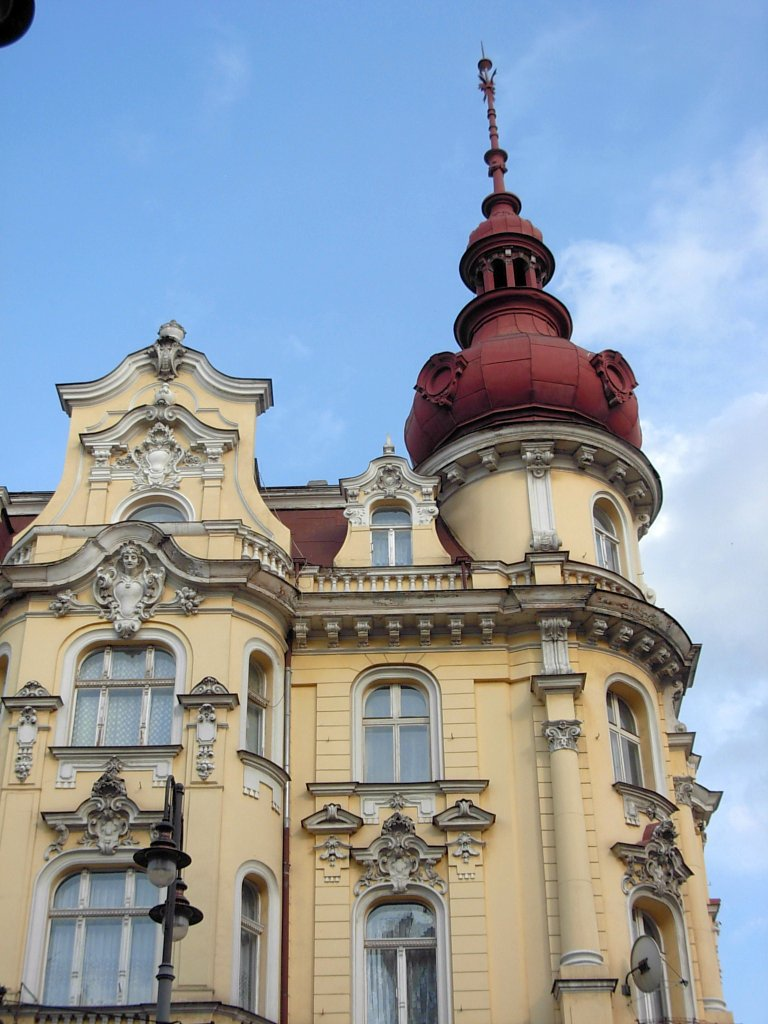
Tower corner

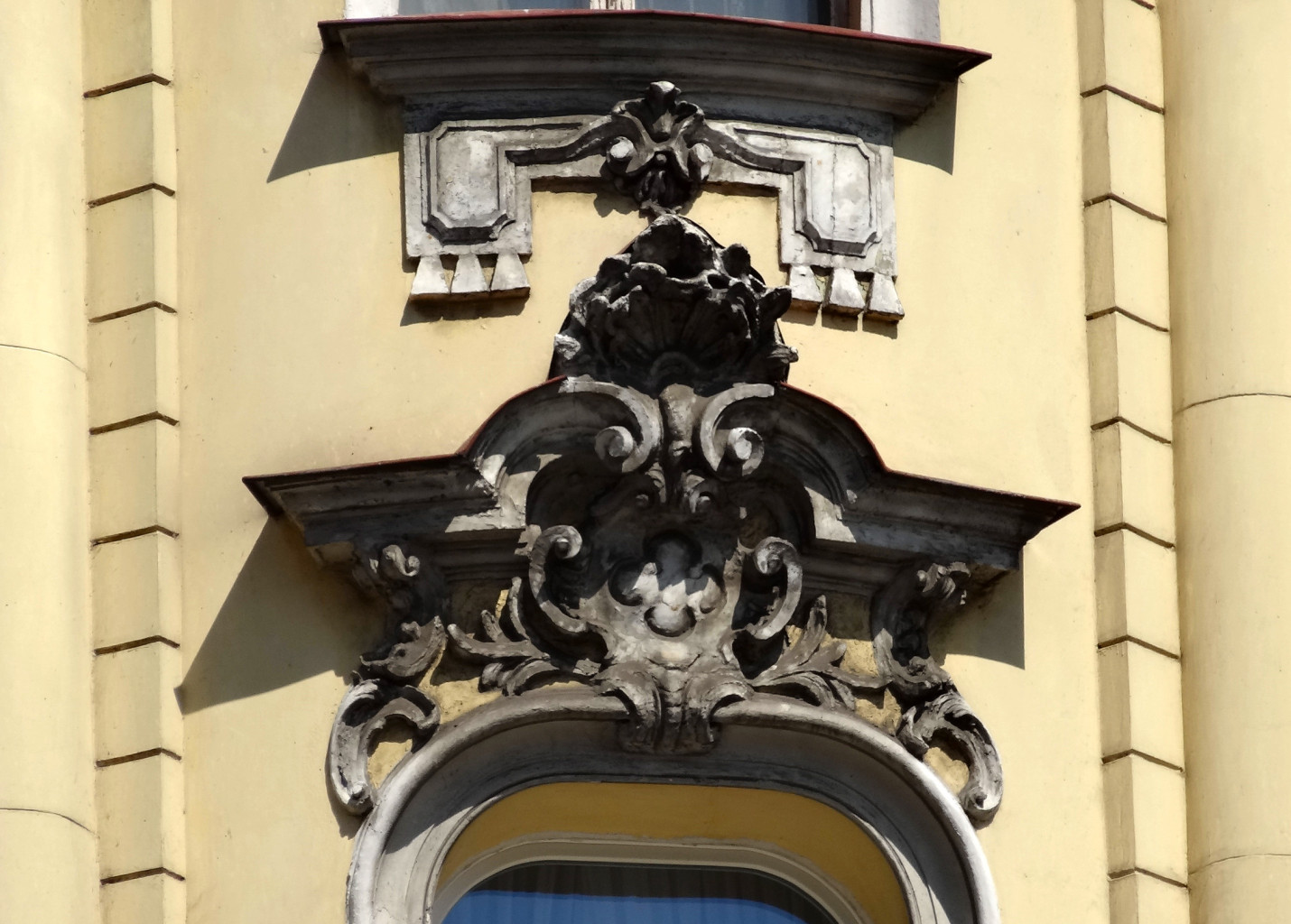
Detailed cartouche

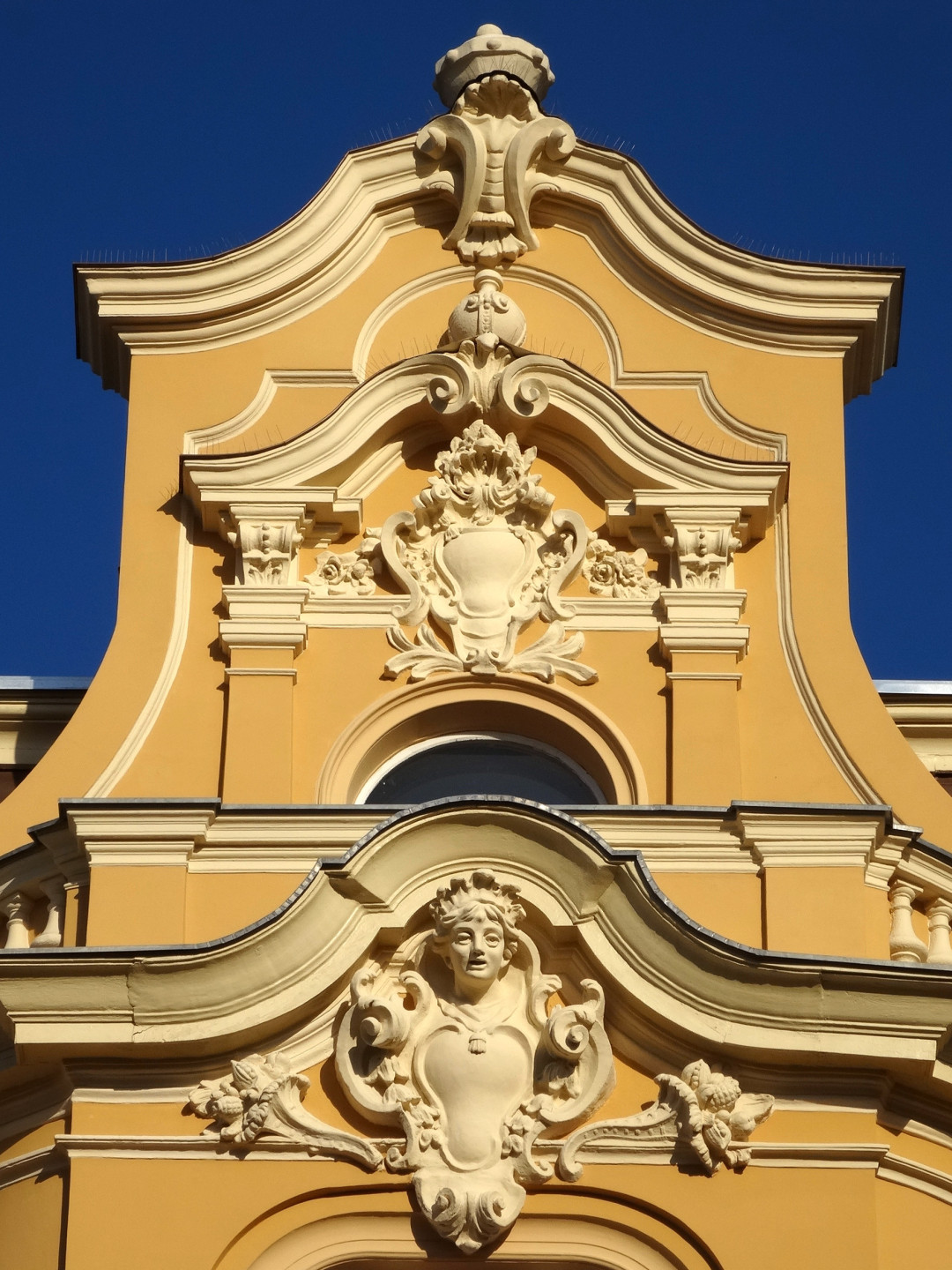
Detail of the gable

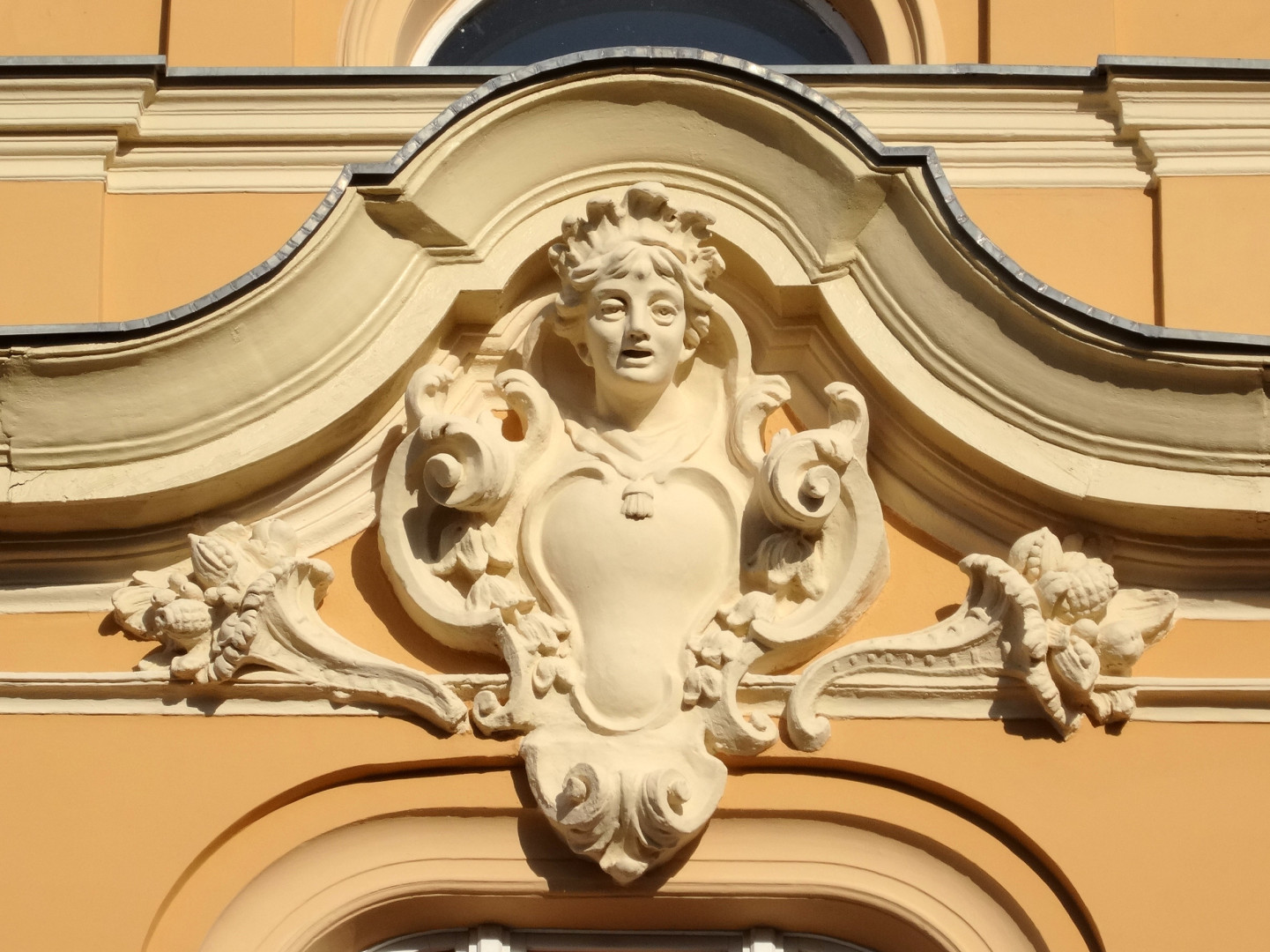
Ornamentation detail

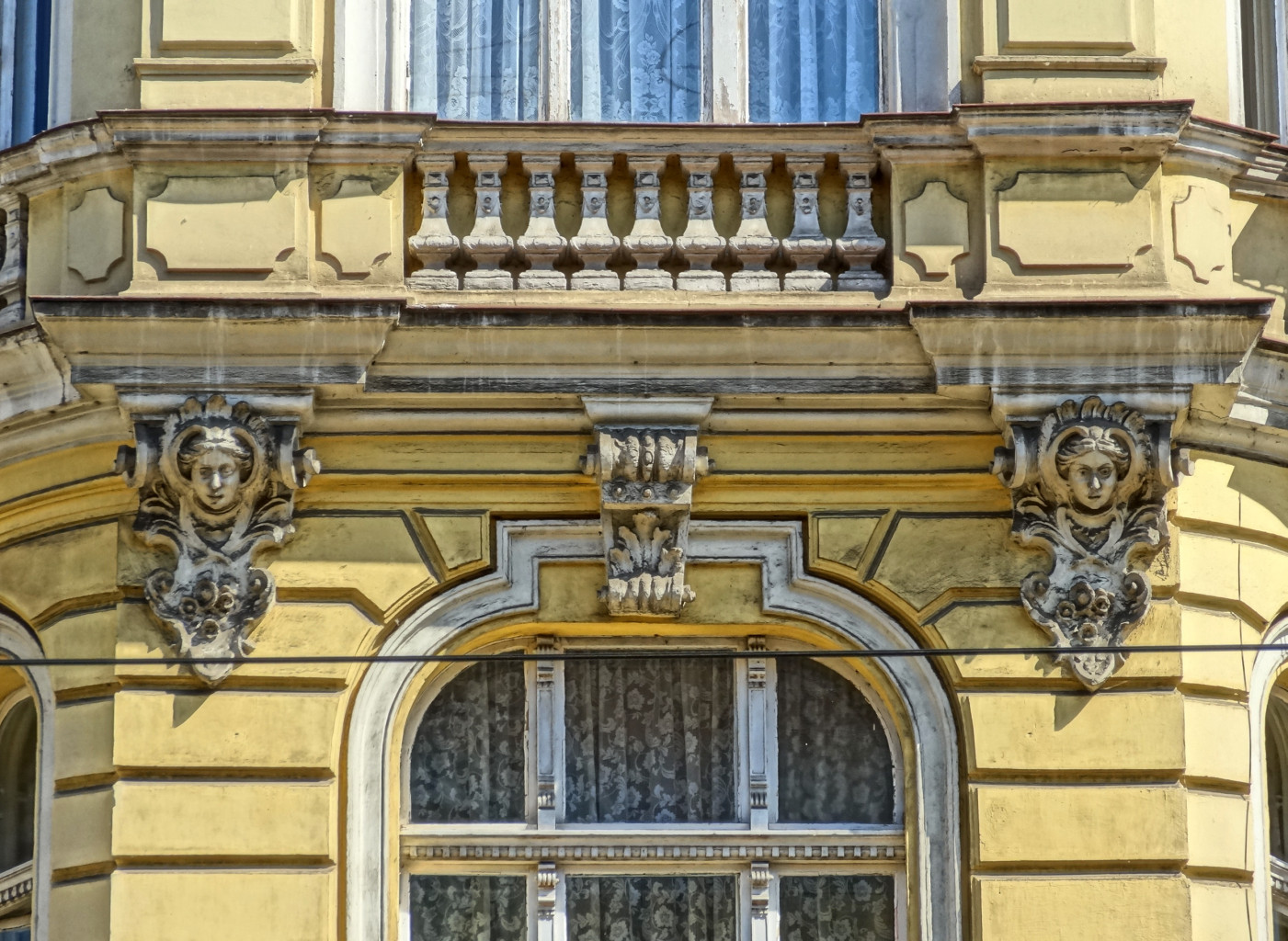
Balcony with railing

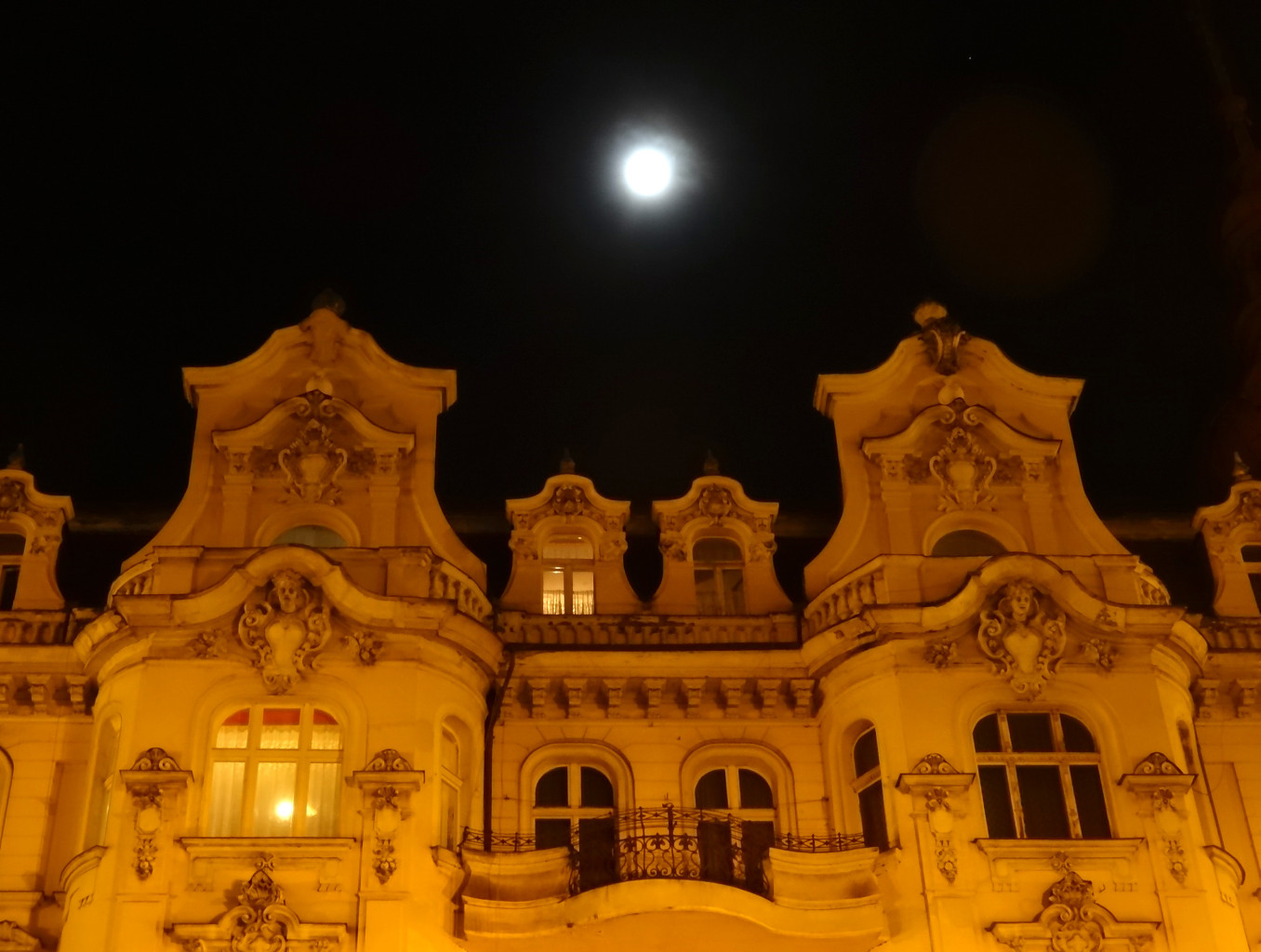
By night

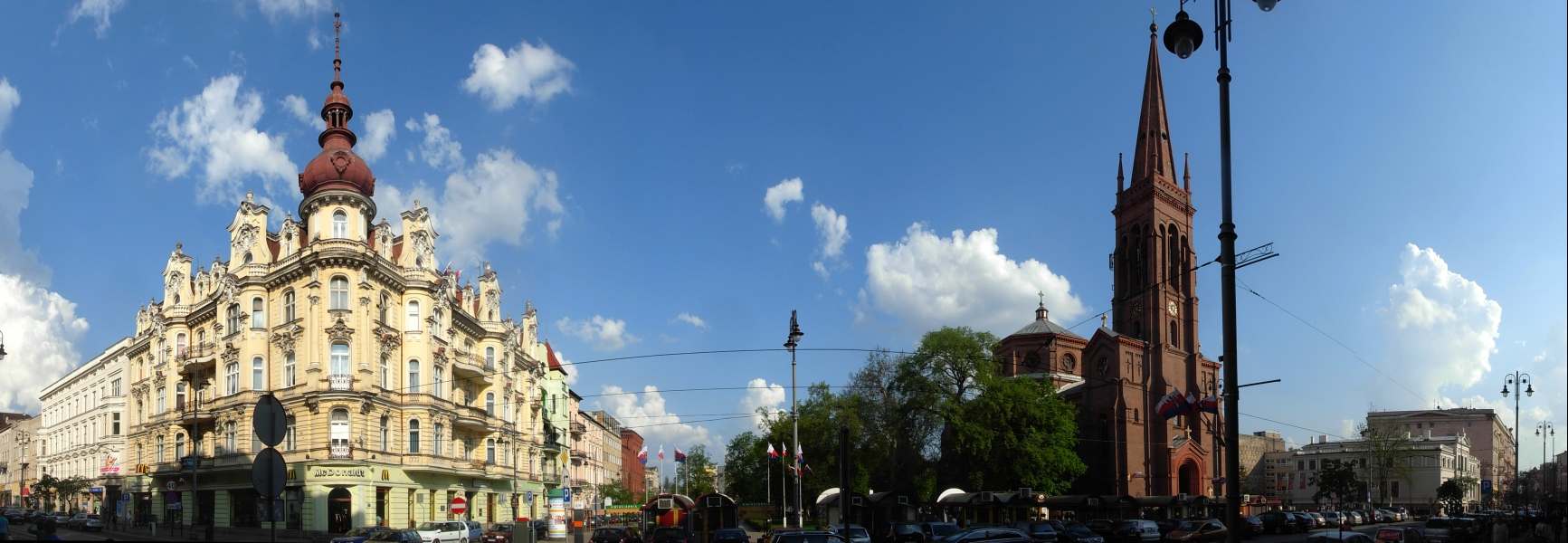
Panorama-Tenement from Gdańska street and Plac Wolności

== See also ==
- Bydgoszcz
- Plac Wolnosci
- Gdańska Street, Bydgoszcz
- St Peter's and St Paul's Church, Bydgoszcz
- Casimir the Great Park
- Freedom Monument, Bydgoszcz
- Józef Święcicki

== Bibliography ==
- (in Polish) Bręczewska-Kulesza Daria, Derkowska-Kostkowska Bogna, Wysocka A (2003). Ulica Gdańska. Przewodnik historyczny. Bydgoszcz: Wojewódzki Ośrodek Kultury w Bydgoszczy. ISBN 9788386970100.
- (in Polish) Derkowska-Kostkowska, Bogna (2009). Dzieje kamienicy przy placu Wolności 1 w Bydgoszczy. Materiały do dziejów kultury i sztuki Bydgoszczy i regionu. zeszyt 14. Bydgoszcz: Pracownia Dokumentacji i Popularyzacji Zabytków Wojewódzkiego Ośrodka Kultury w Bydgoszczy.
- (in Polish) Parucka, Krystyna (2008). Zabytki Bydgoszczy – minikatalog. Bydgoszcz: "Tifen" Krystyna Parucka. ISBN 978-83-927191-0-6.
