= Adam Mickiewicz Avenue, Bydgoszcz =

Street in Bydgoszcz, Poland

Coordinates: 53.1313°N 18.0120°E

Adam Mickiewicz Alley
Bydgoszcz
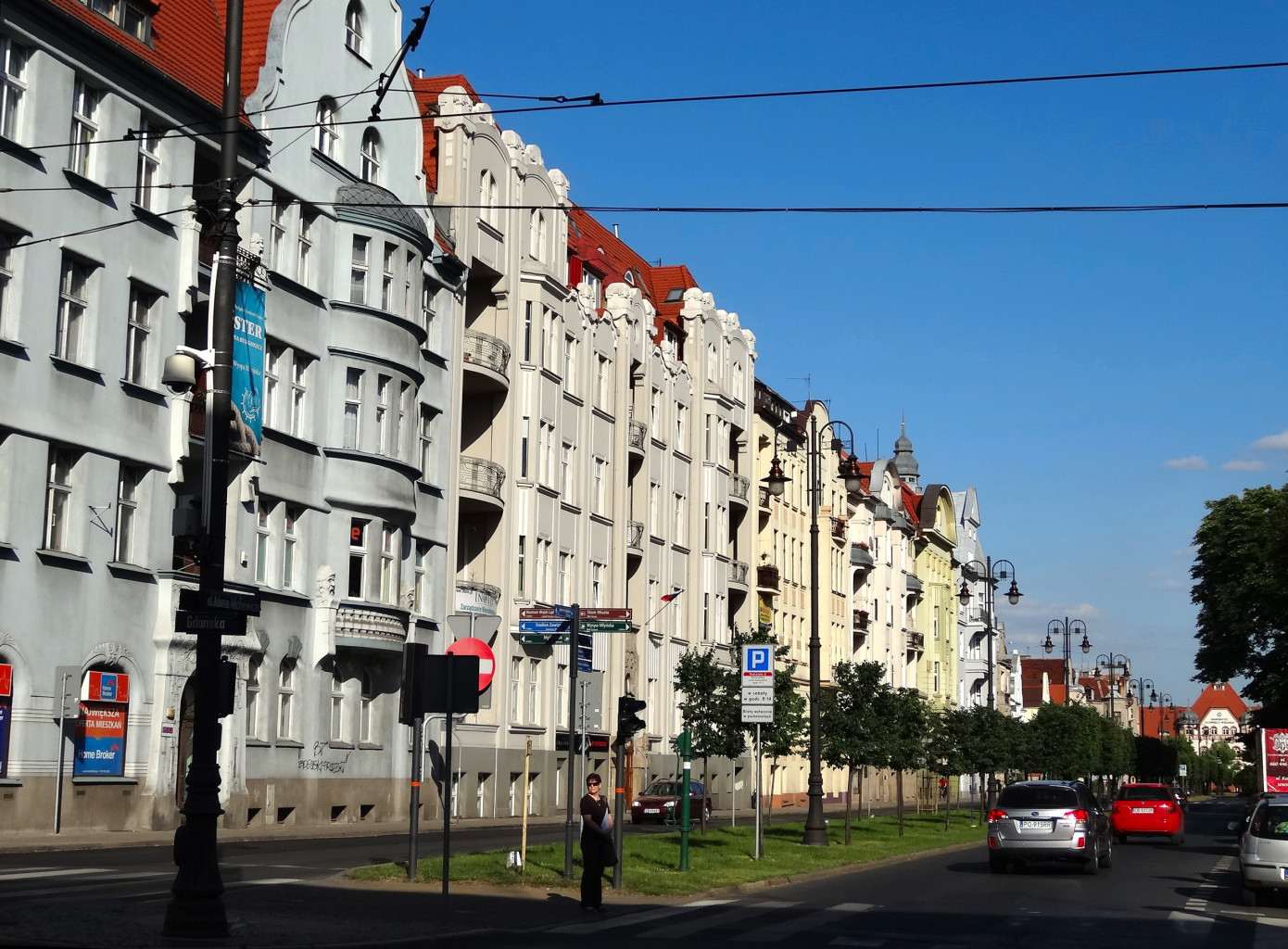
- View of the street

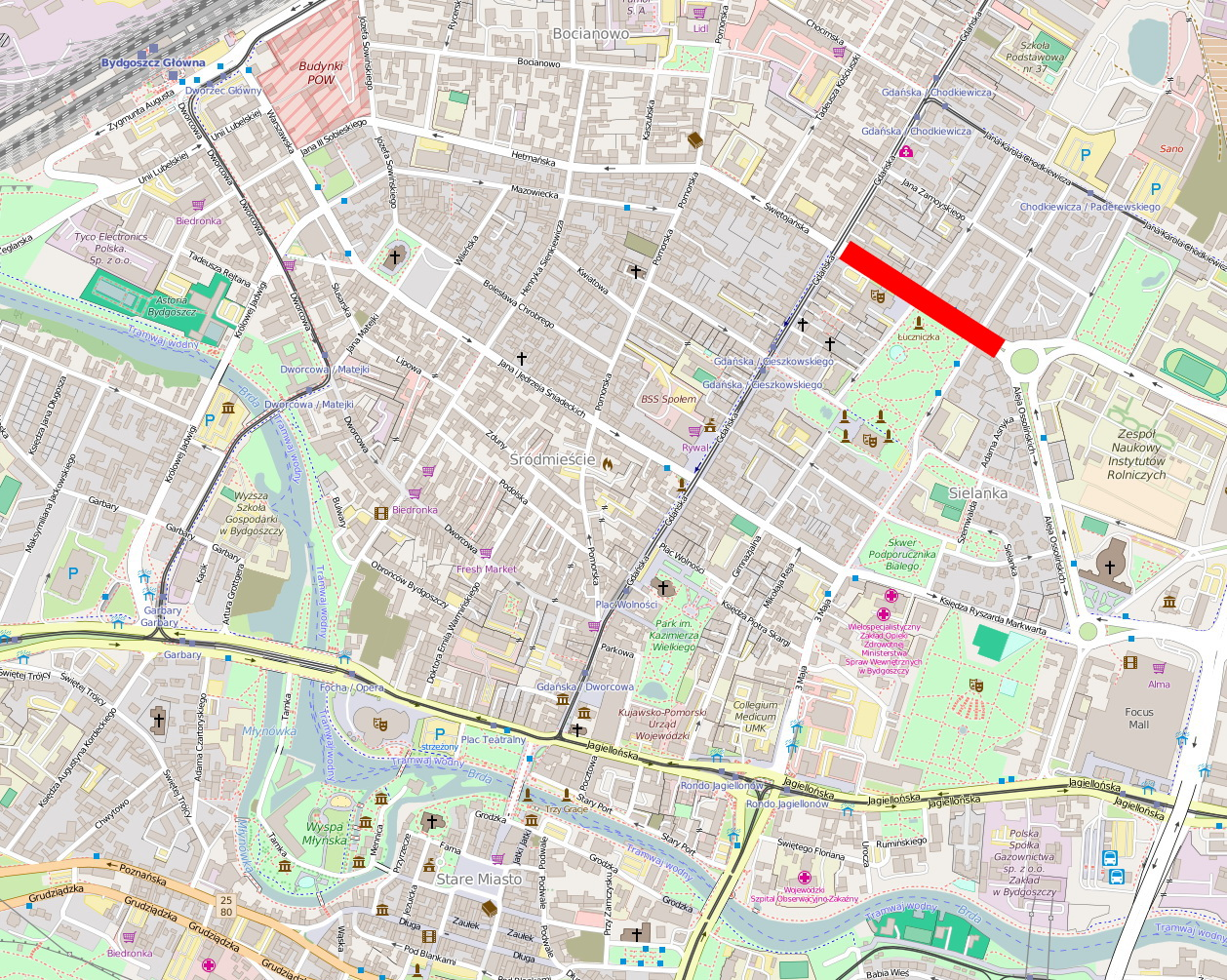
- Location of Adam Mickiewicz Alley
- Native name: Aleja Adama Mickiewicza w Bydgoszczy (Polish)
- Former names: Bülowstraße, Felix-Dahn-Straße
- Part of: Bydgoszcz Old town district
- Namesake: Adam Mickiewicz
- Owner: City of Bydgoszcz
- Length: 400 m (1,300 ft)
- Location: Bydgoszcz, Poland

Adam Mickiewicz Alley is one of the main streets of downtown district in Bydgoszcz, where several buildings are registered on the Kuyavian-Pomeranian Voivodeship Heritage List.

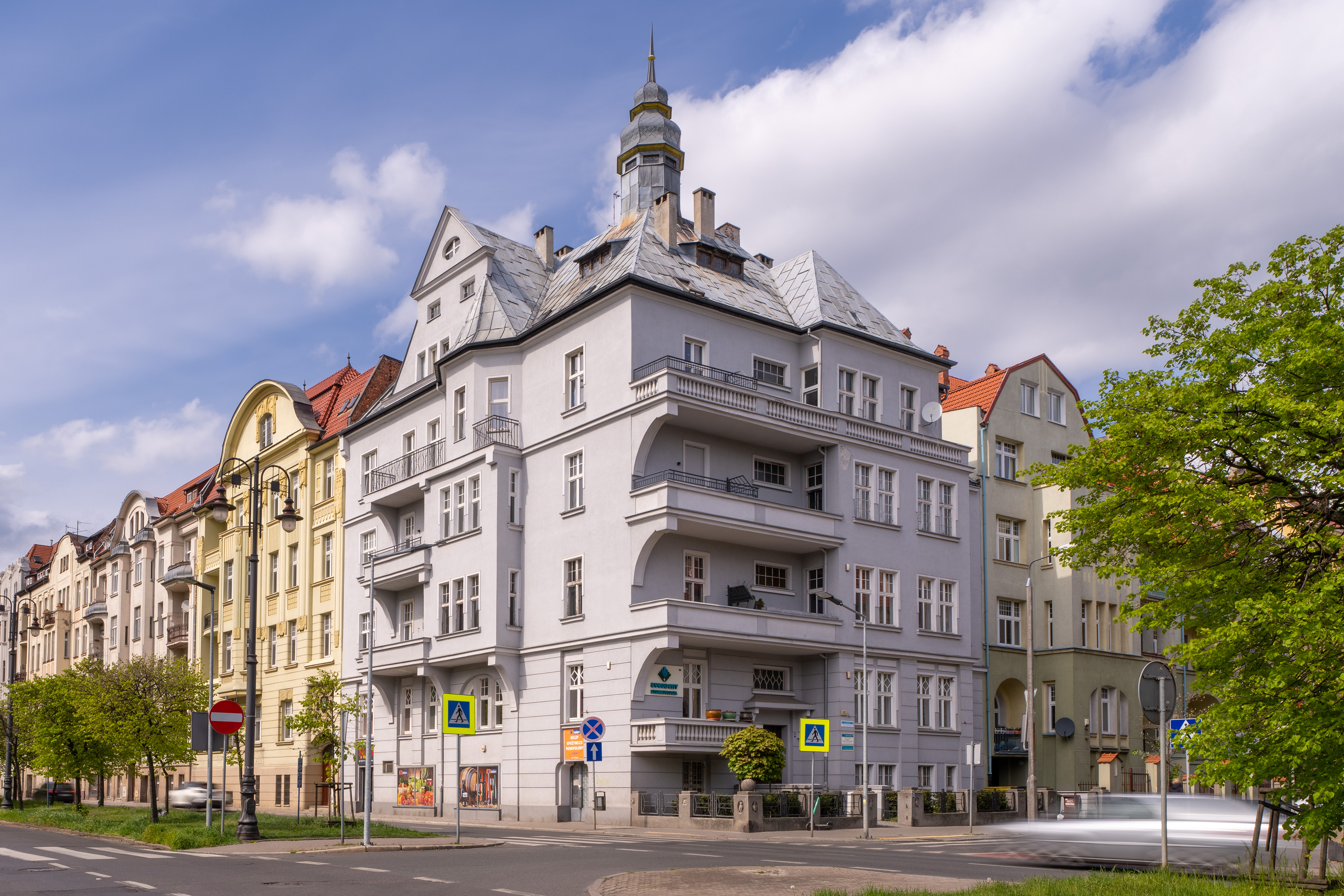
Northern frontage viewed westwards

== Location ==
The street links Gdańska Street to Józef Weyssenhoff Square. Its northern frontage is a set of tenements and villas built in the first decade of the 20th century. On the southern side are located the Polish Theatre and Jan Kochanowski Park.

== Naming ==
- 1906–1920, Bülowstraße, after Bernhard von Bülow;
- 1920–1939, Aleje Adama Mickiewicza after Adam Mickiewicz;
- 1939–1945, Felix-Dahn-Straße, after Felix Dahn;
- Since 1945, Aleje Adama Mickiewicza

== History ==
=== Adam Mickiewicz Alley ===
Adam Mickiewicz Alley has been laid out in 1903, in the conditions of an urban development of the eastern area of Gdańska Street called "Hempelscher Felde": this plot was bought in the 1890s by the municipality to develop its urban plans based on a garden city concept developed by Hermann Stübben.

The highlight of the whole project was the Bülow street, then one of the most beautiful and widest thoroughfare of the city. It comprised a dual carriageway starting from Dantziger strasse, running eastward. The perspective was particularly taken care of, emphasized by a row of trees, with stretched garlands of vines. At the same time, the Ossolińscy street, continuation of the axis from Weyssenhoff square, was defined in its main features.

The northern frontage of Adam Mickiewicz Alley has been conceived from 1903 to 1907 as an homogeneous complex of Berlin Art Nouveau tenements, similar to what has been erected at the same time in Dworcowa Street (Nr.45, 47, 49). In 1910, an addition to the frontage, consisting of villas and houses has been erected. The perspective of the street to the east has been closed by the building of the Institute of Agriculture (Ger. Kaiser-Wilhelm-Institut für Landwirtschaft), then the first high school scientific department in Bromberg.

In 1949, the Polish Theatre has been completed, standing at the intersection with 20 January 1920 Street. In 1960, the Archer Statue has been moved from Theatre square to Jan Kochanowski Park. Most of the facade decorations and reliefs have been deteriorated by lack of treatment during the post-war years.

The street has undergone a gradual revitalization after 1990. Between 2002 and 2009, all street facades have been was renovated, and, when possible, restored with their original decorations.

== Jan Kochanowski Park ==
This green estate runs on the southern side of Adam Mickiewicz Alley, between January 20, 1920 street on the west and Ignac Paderewski street on the east, extending to the south till the Pomeranian Philharmonic.

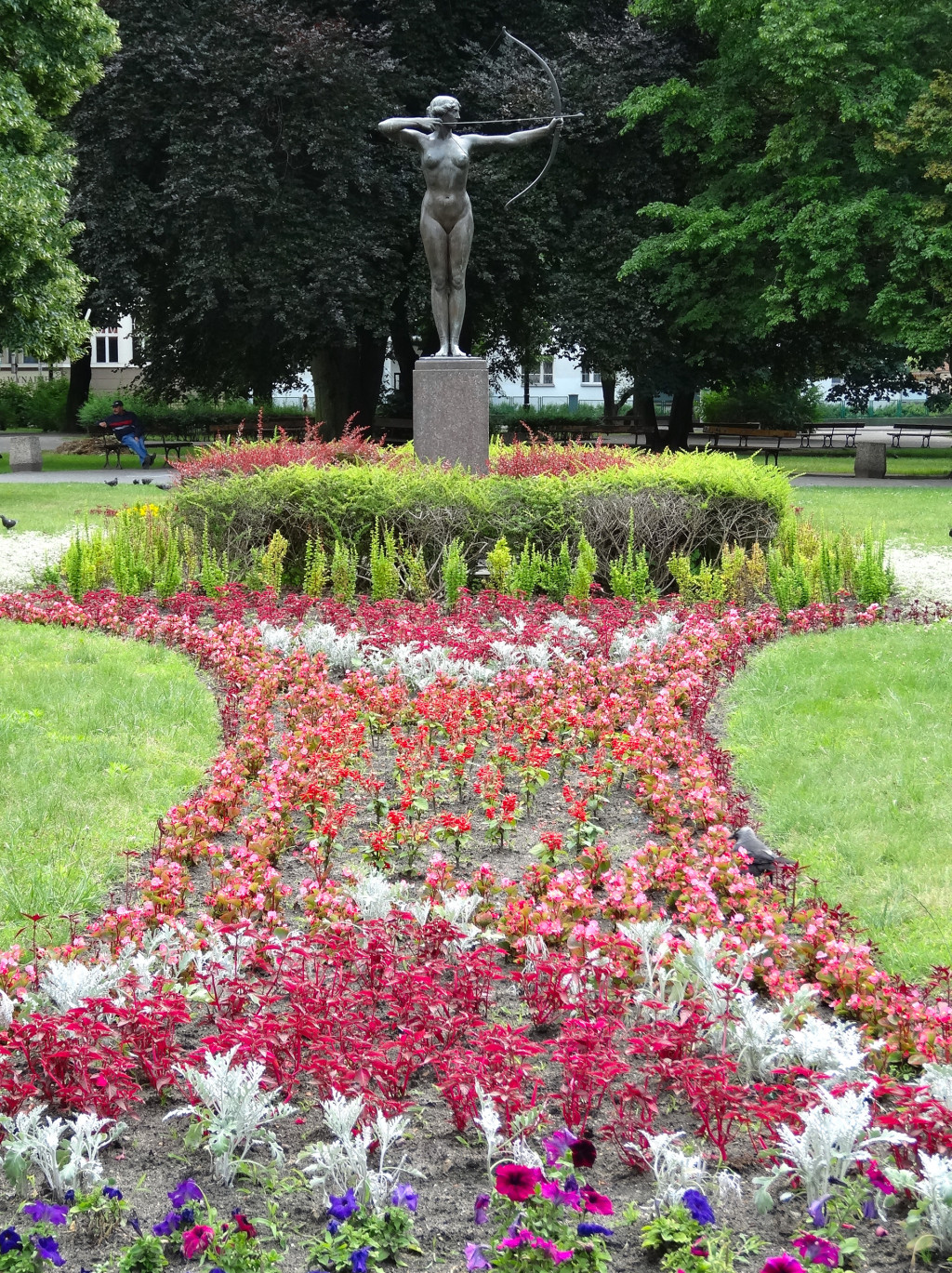
"The Archer" by Ferdinand Lepcke, author also of the Deluge Fountain

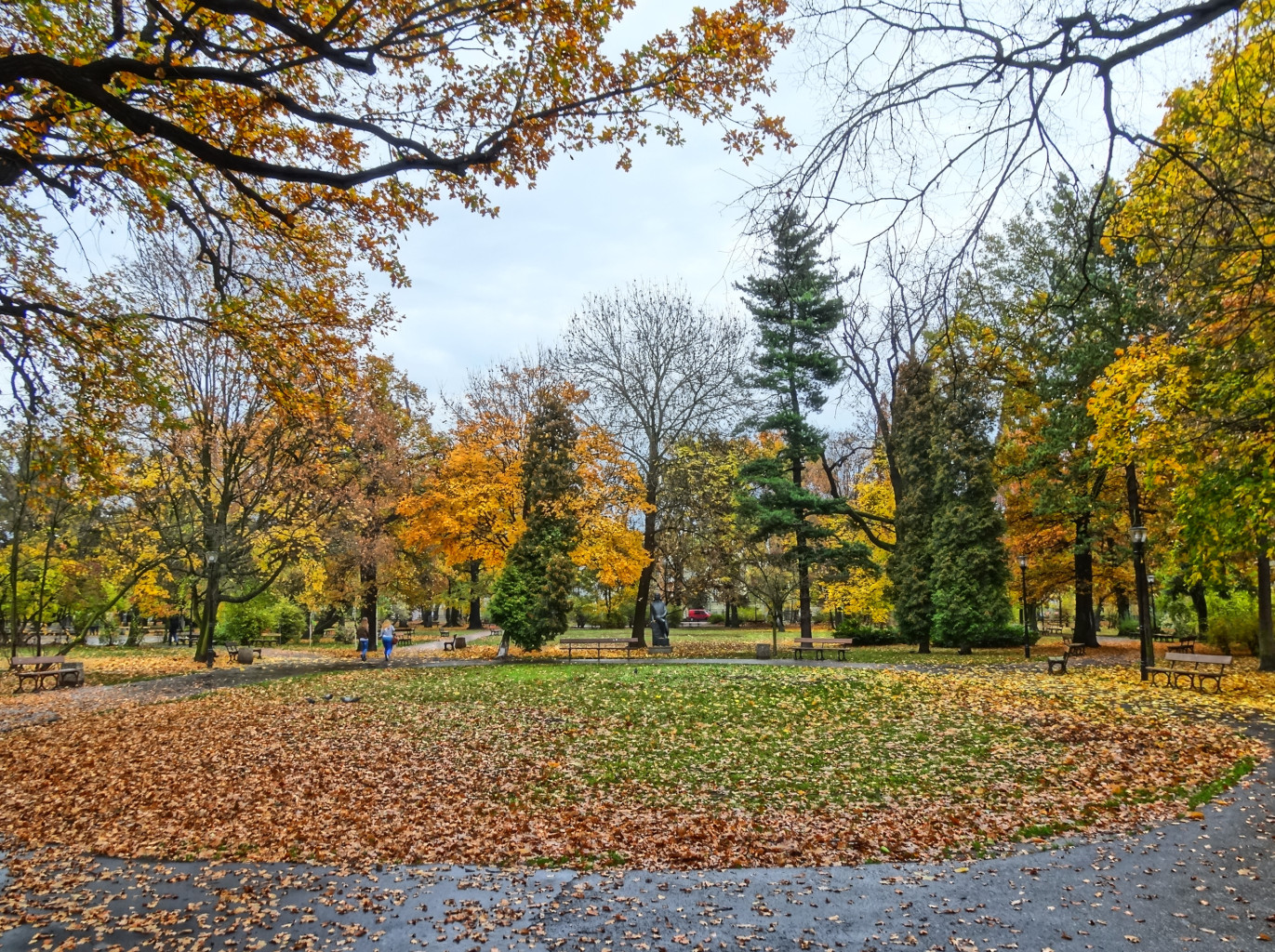
"The Archer" with the Polski theatre in the background

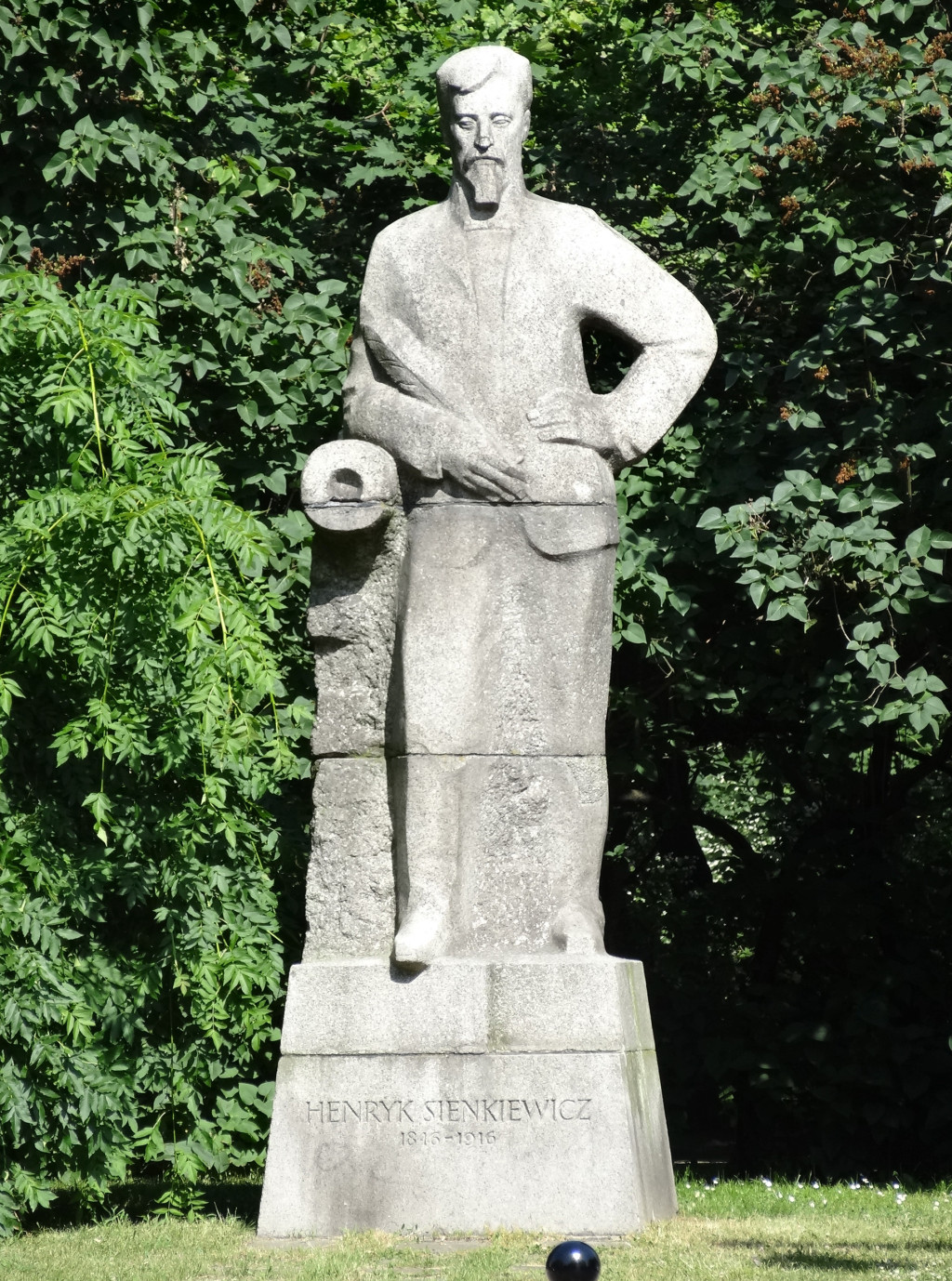
Monument to Henryk Sienkiewicz

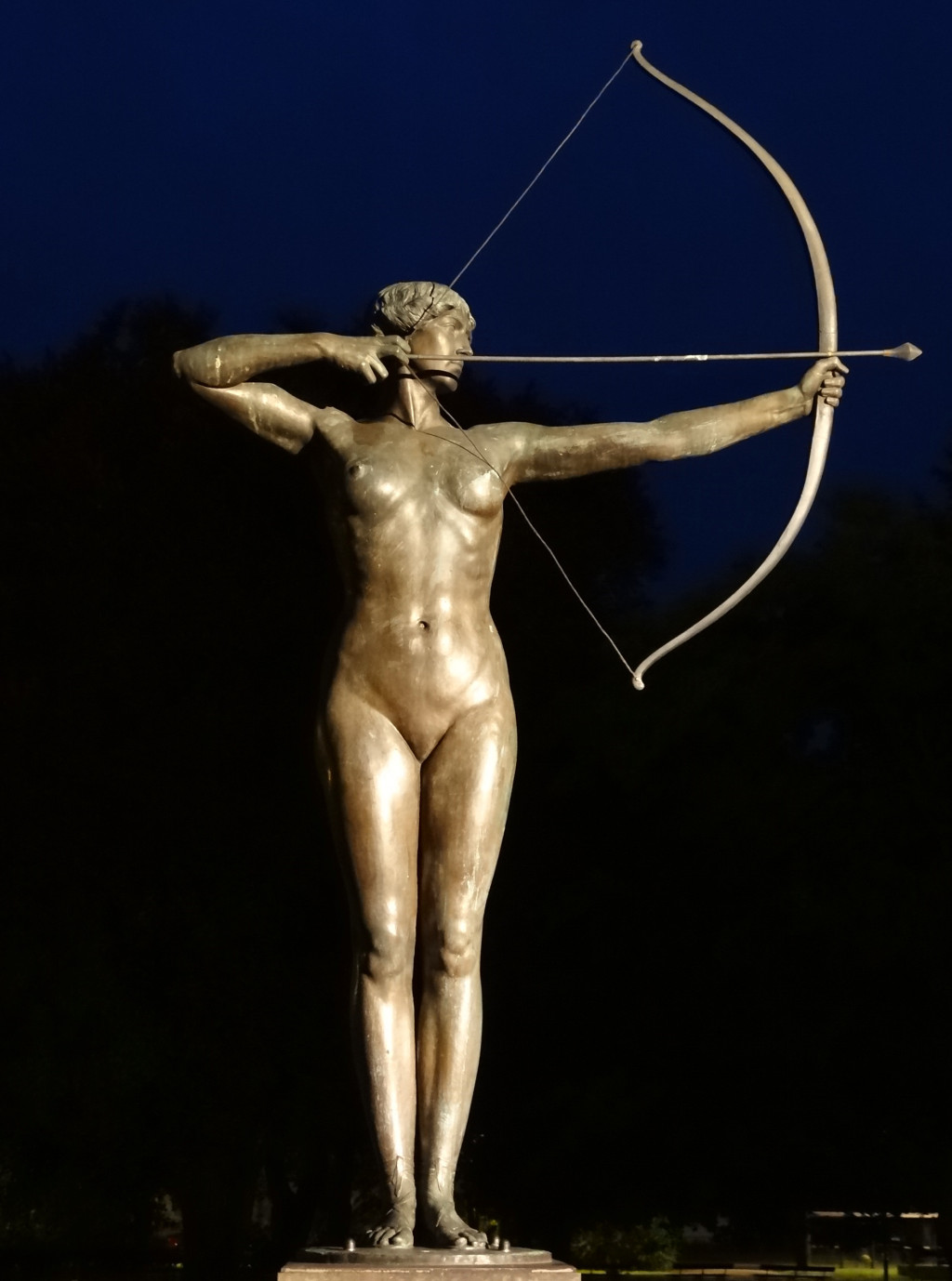
"The Archer" by night
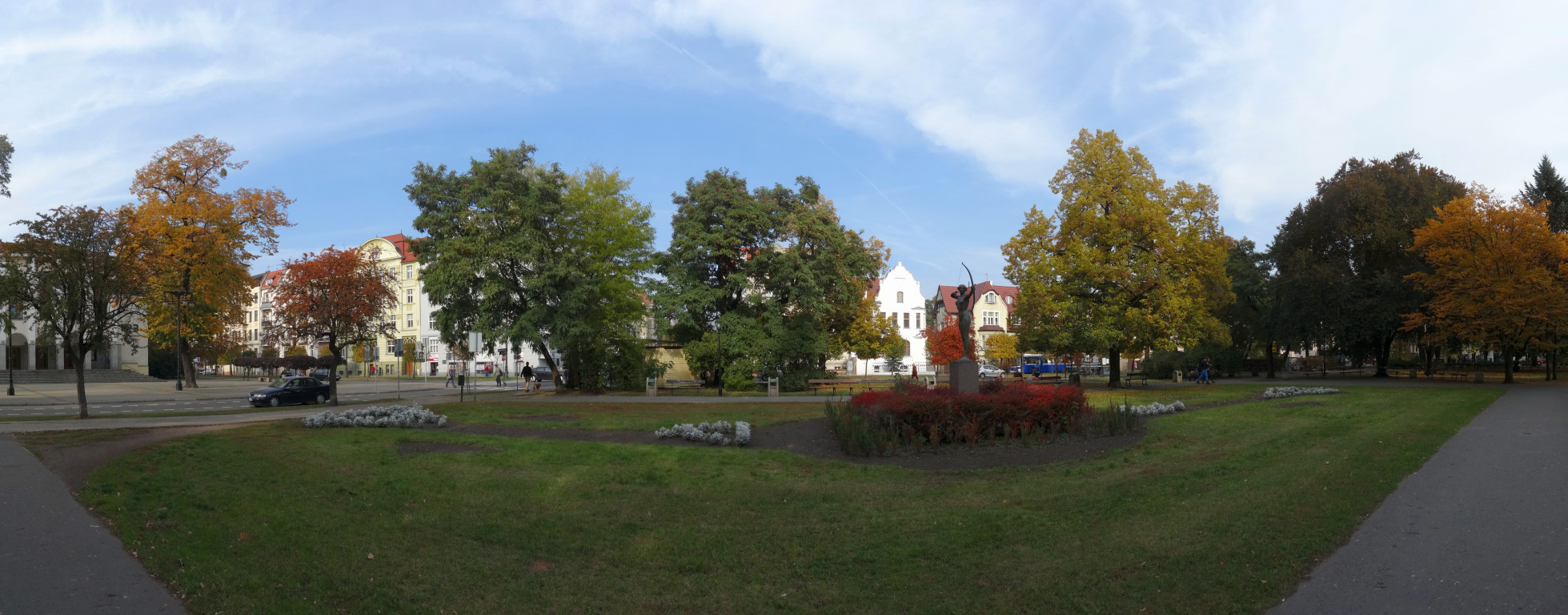
Panorama on the park

== Architecture ==
Frontages on Mickiewicz alley (Nr.1 to 9) compose a complex of townhouses inscribed in the German variant of Art Nouveau architecture (Ger. "Jugendstil"). Predominant forms evoke quietness, through varied bay windows, divided balconies and loggias integrating wavy lines, wavy gables, vaulted windows and portals. Decoration combines organic themes with geometric forms, like rectangular and square shapes, grouped in series and friezes. The ensemble reminds also Baroque style at by applying domes avant-corps and towers topped with peaks.

The architects who designed those buildings were all inspired by Berlin architecture, "en vogue" at the time:

- Rudolf Kern who built also tenements in Gdańska Street at 5, N67, 66/68, 71;
- Erich Lindenburger who constructed also in Dworcowa Street (Nr.41,43,45,47);
- Paul Böhm who realized houses on August Cieszkowski Street in Bydgoszcz at Nr.1 and 3;
- Otto Rosenthal;
- Józef Święcicki, known for its dozens of realization in Gdańska Street.

For almost the entire post-war period, tenements have been property of the state. In 1990, the city of Bydgoszcz owned them back, but at the time, they were falling into disrepair as a result of underinvestment, lack of maintenance and general neglect of Art Nouveau monuments. Buildings have been restored after 2002.

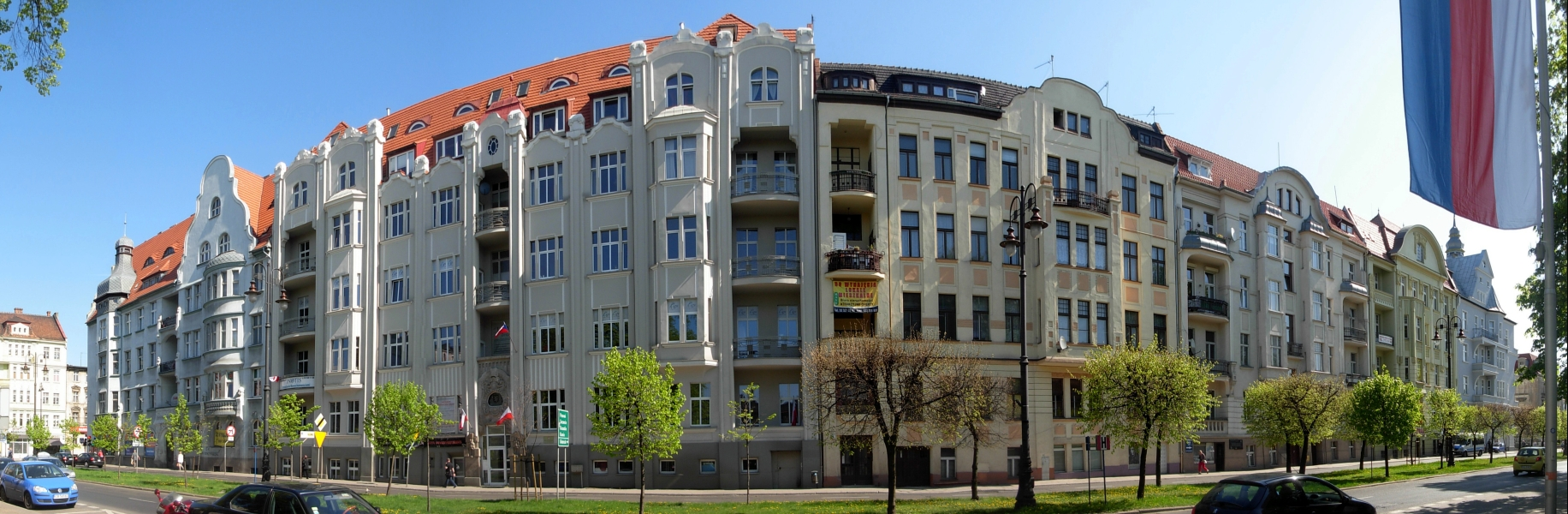
Panorama of the frontage of Adam Mickiewicz Alley

== Main places and buildings ==
=== Rudolf Kern Building at 1, corner with Gdańska Street ===
Registered on Kuyavian-Pomeranian Voivodeship heritage list, Nr.601377-Reg.A/1086 (November 20, 1995)

1903–1904, by Rudolf Kern

Art Nouveau

The tenement has been designed by the architect Rudolf Kern, a student of Józef Święcicki, for his own use, private and business: he has lived there until 1922.

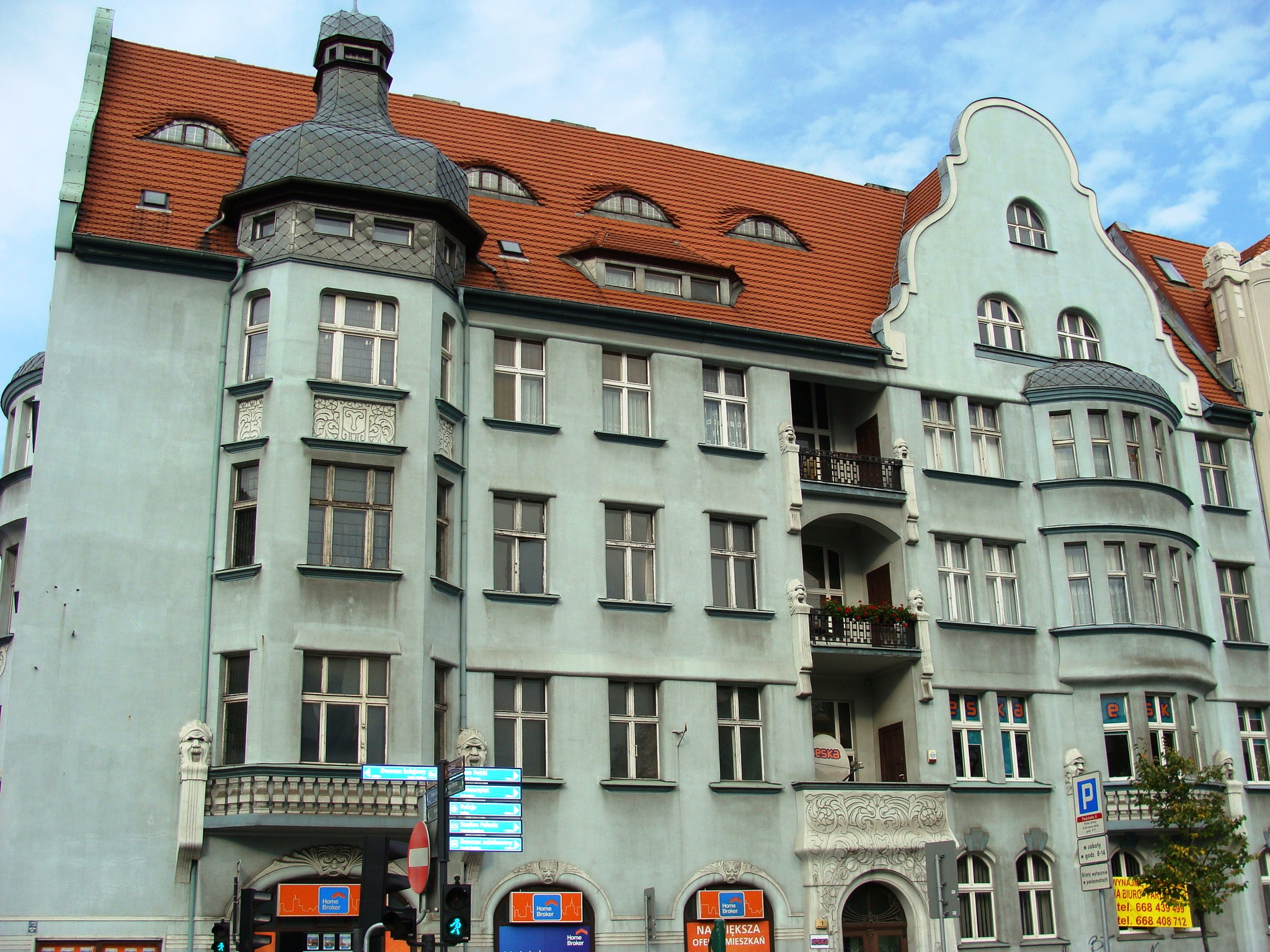
View from Mickiewicz Alley

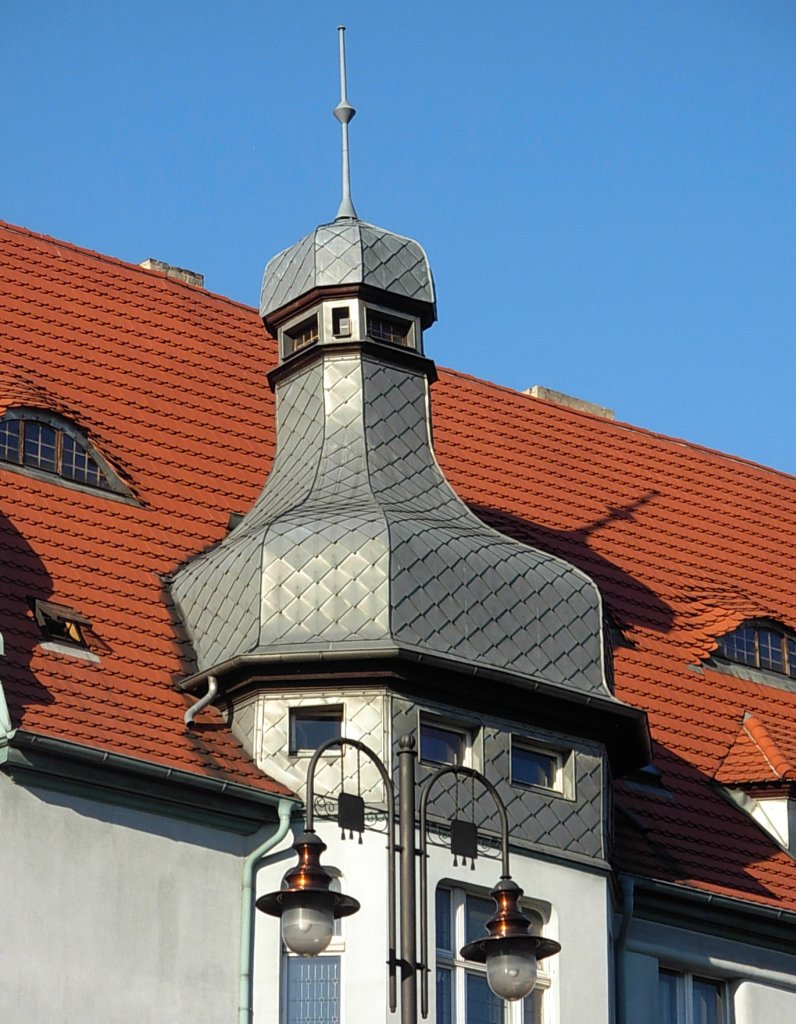
Detail of the peak

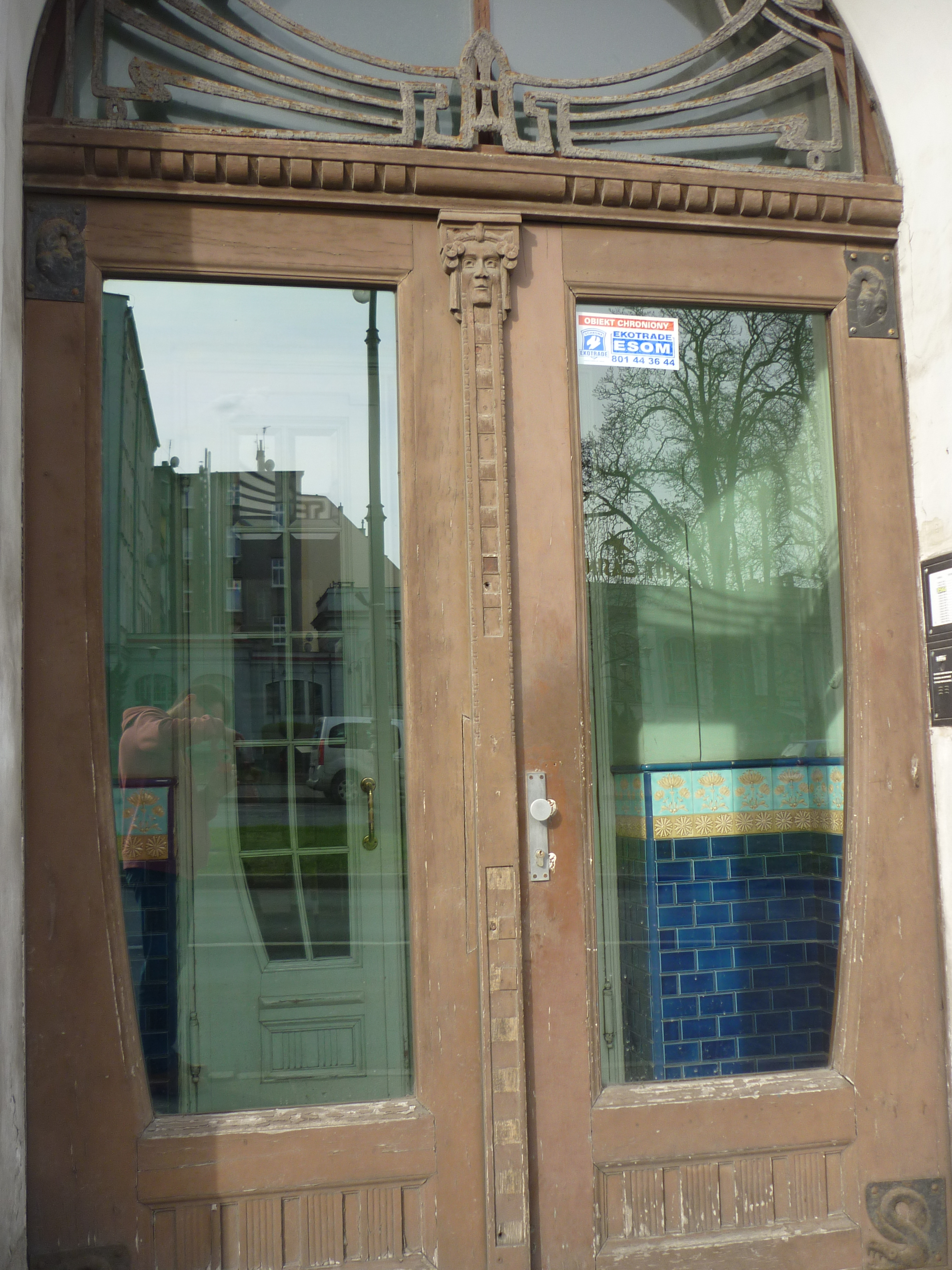
The ornamented gate

=== Polish Theatre in Bydgoszcz, at 2 ===
1948–1949, by Alfons Licznerski

Modern architecture

Hieronim Konieczka Polish Theatre in Bydgoszcz is the largest and best known theatre of the city. It is set at Nr.2. Current director is Paweł Wodziński.

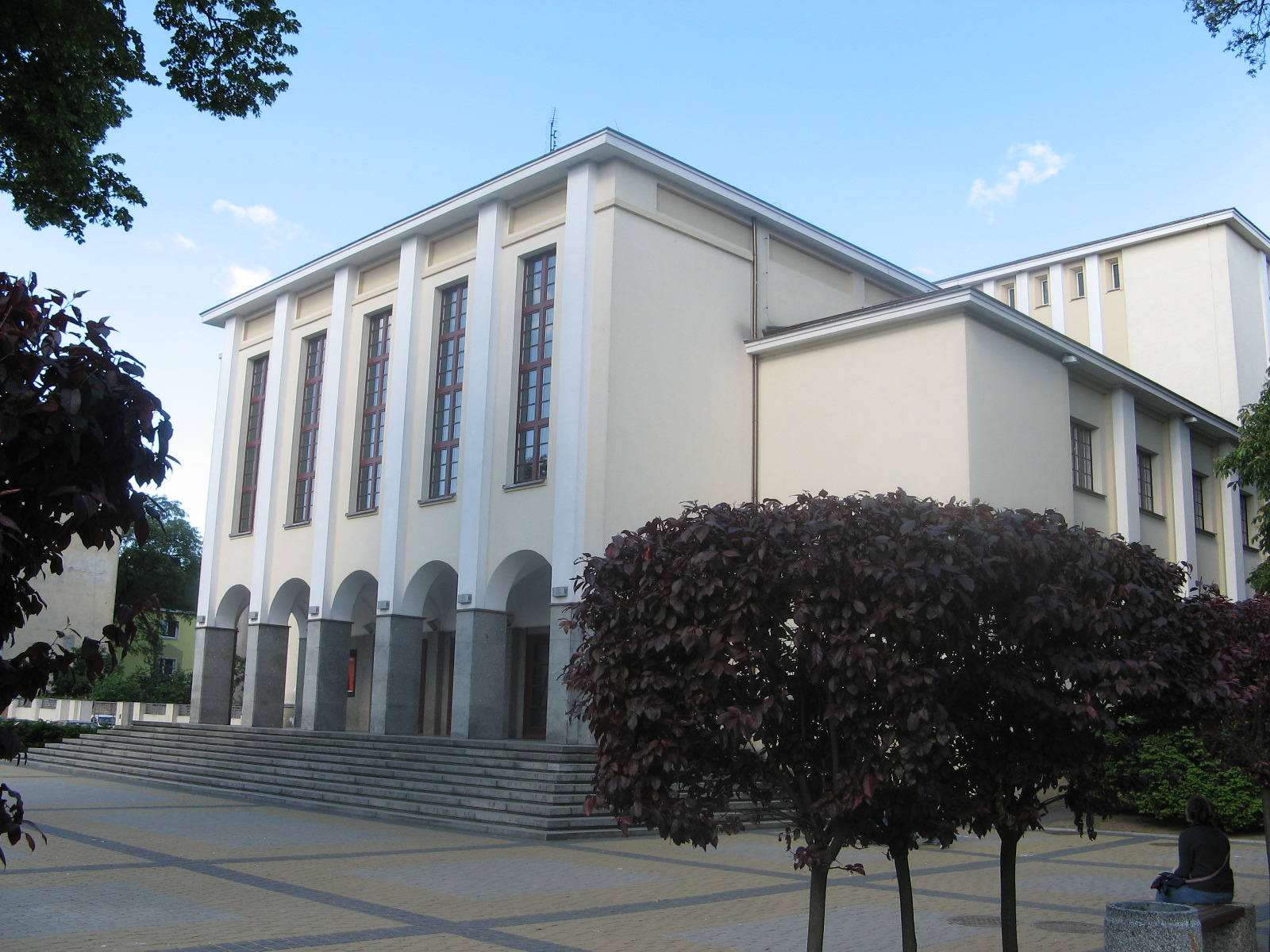
View from Mickiewicz Alley

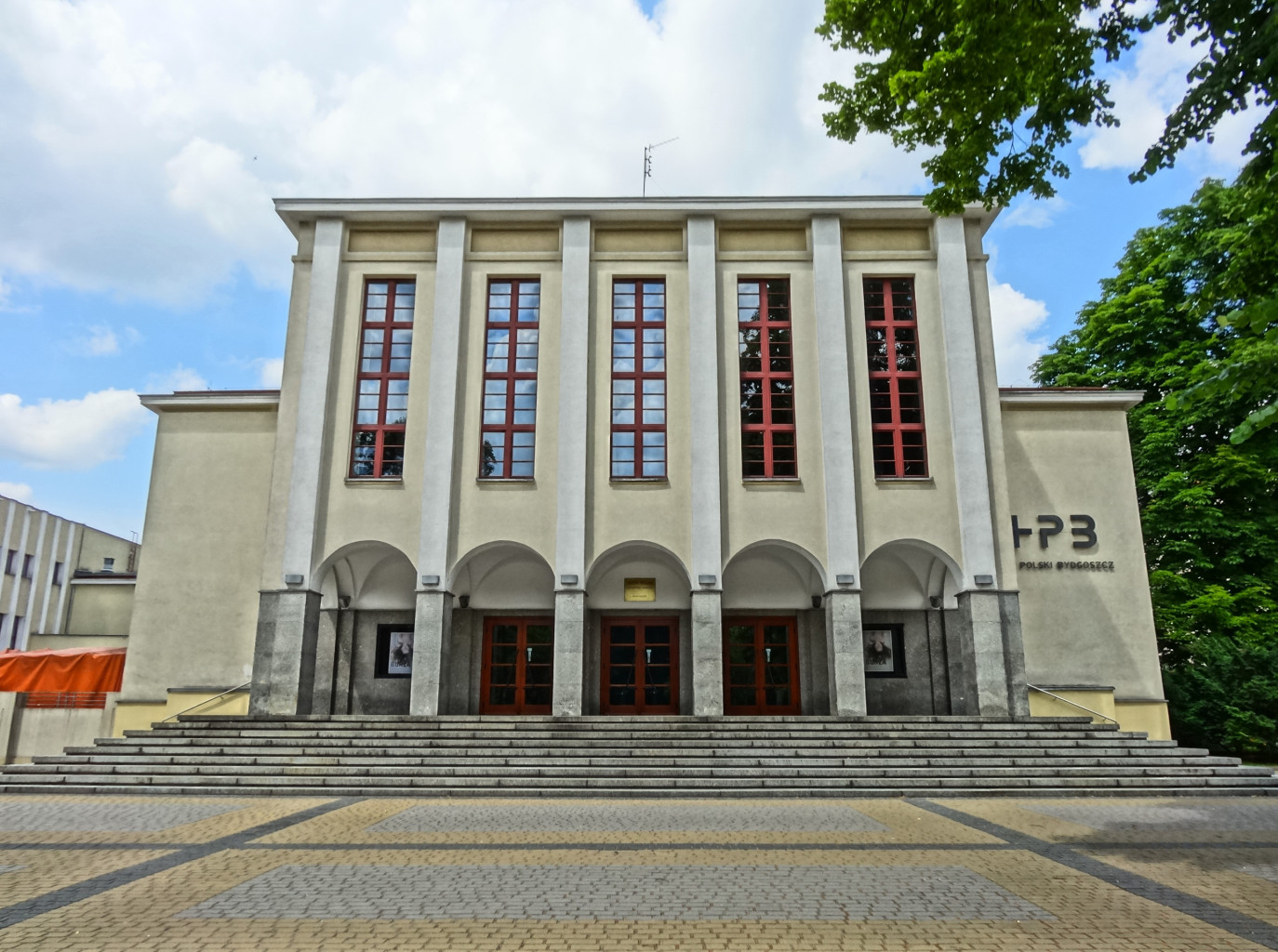
Main entry

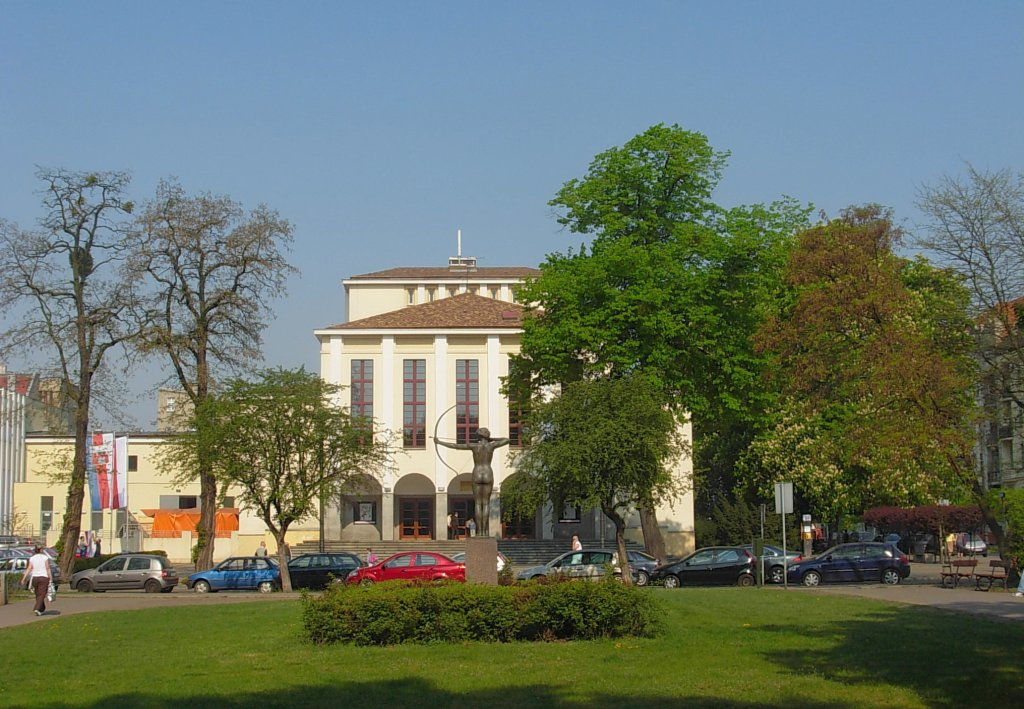
View from Jan Kochanowski Park

=== Erich Lindenburger's tenement at 3 ===
1904–1905, by Erich Lindenburger

Art Nouveau

The building was originally commissioned by a merchant, Georg Woodtke. Erich Lindenburger designed the tenement house and opened there his architectural office. In the interwar, Feliks Kopp's family lived there: he was the son of Wilhelm, entrepreneur who established a successful cleaning and dyehouse factory at Świętej Trójcy Street.

Characteristic features are the adorned portal and decorative gable; the façade has pilaster strips which accentuates vertical divisions. Bay windows are divided with loggias. This building is the seat of the Honorary consulate of Czech Republic.

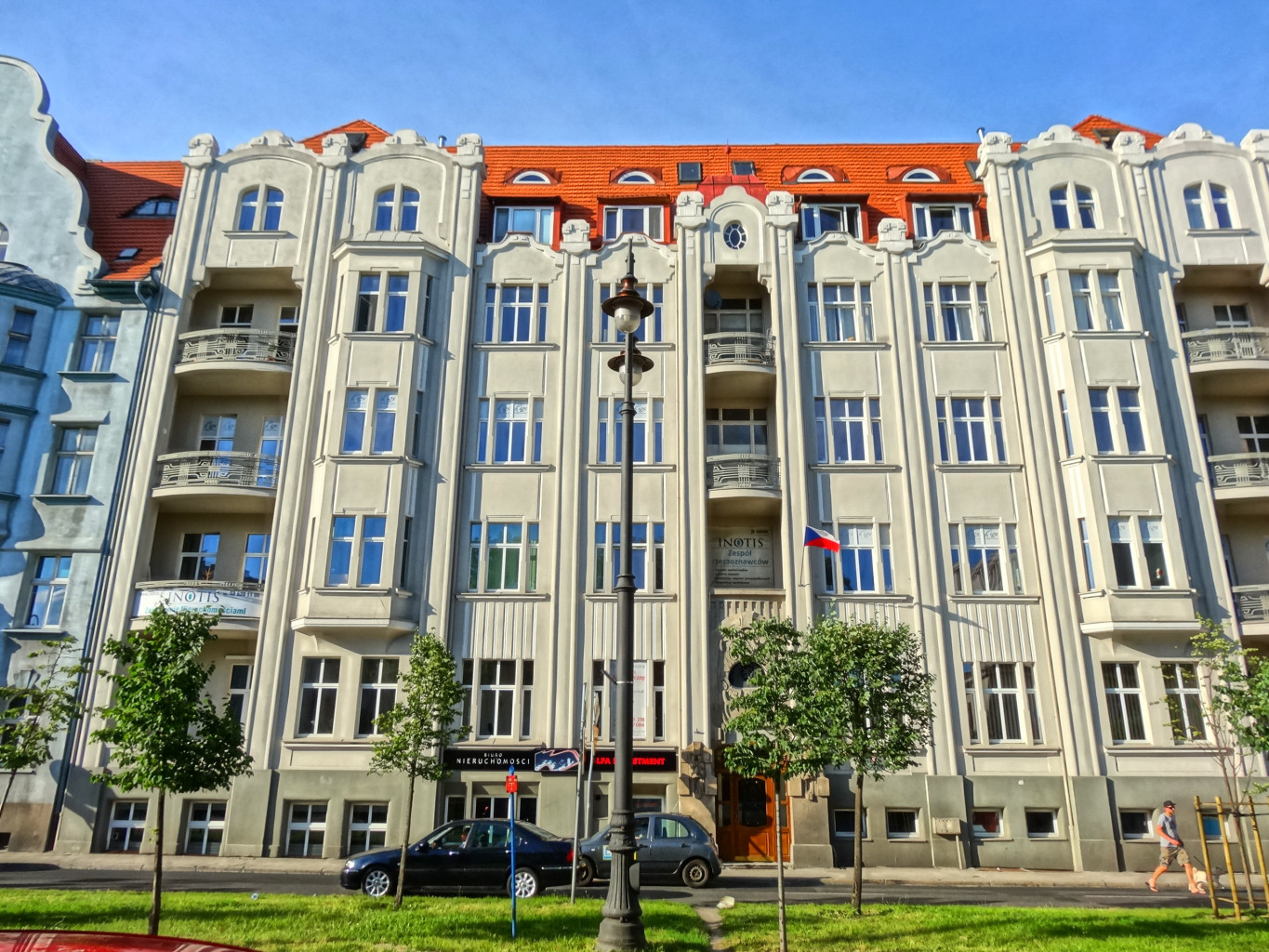
View of the frontage from Mickiewicz Alley

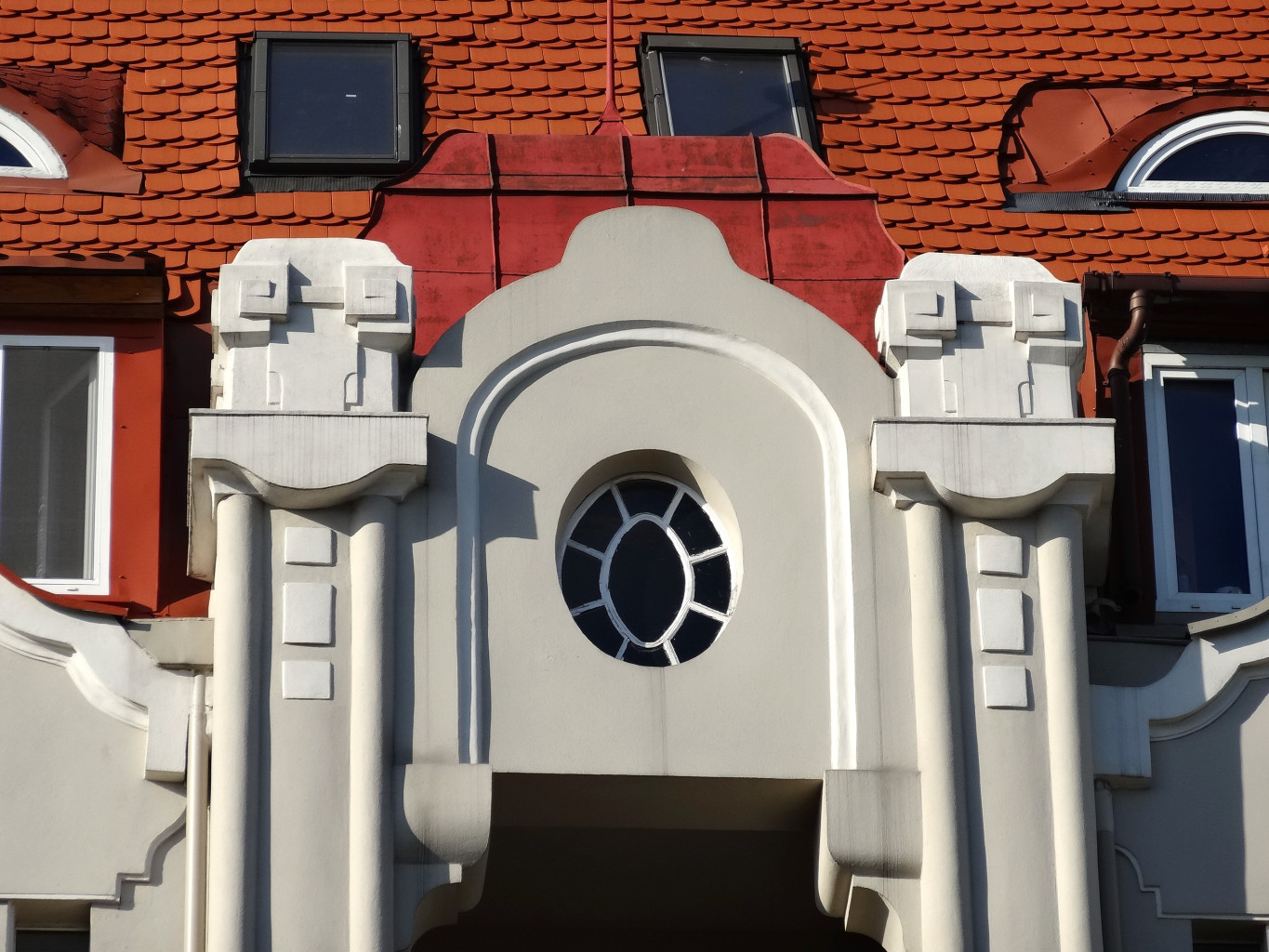
Detail of the tinned roofed bay window

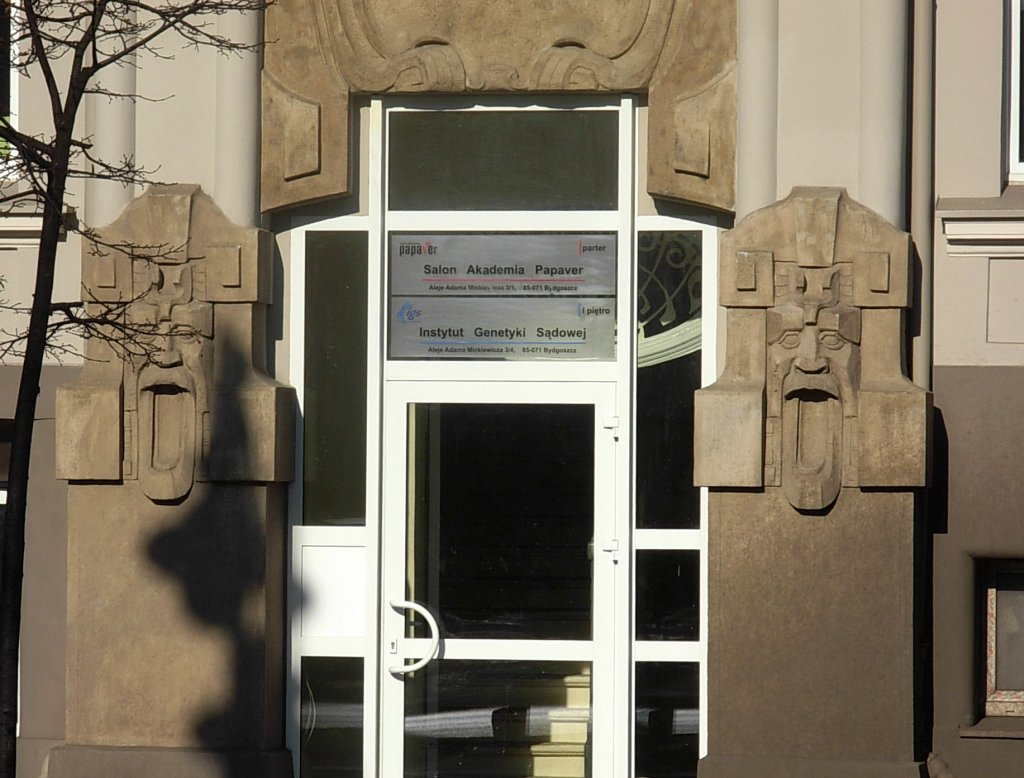
Grandiose front gate

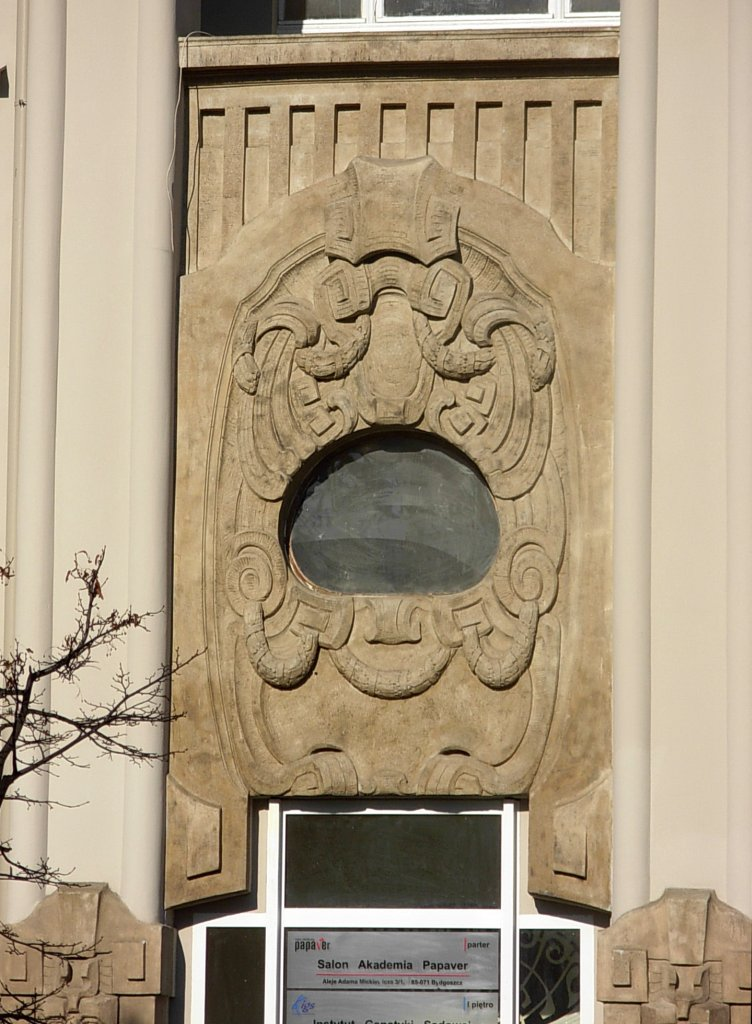
Front gate top

=== House at 4, corner with Paderewskiego street ===
1906-1908

Art Nouveau

This building displays highly decorated balconies and bay windows. The roof boasts eyelid dormers.

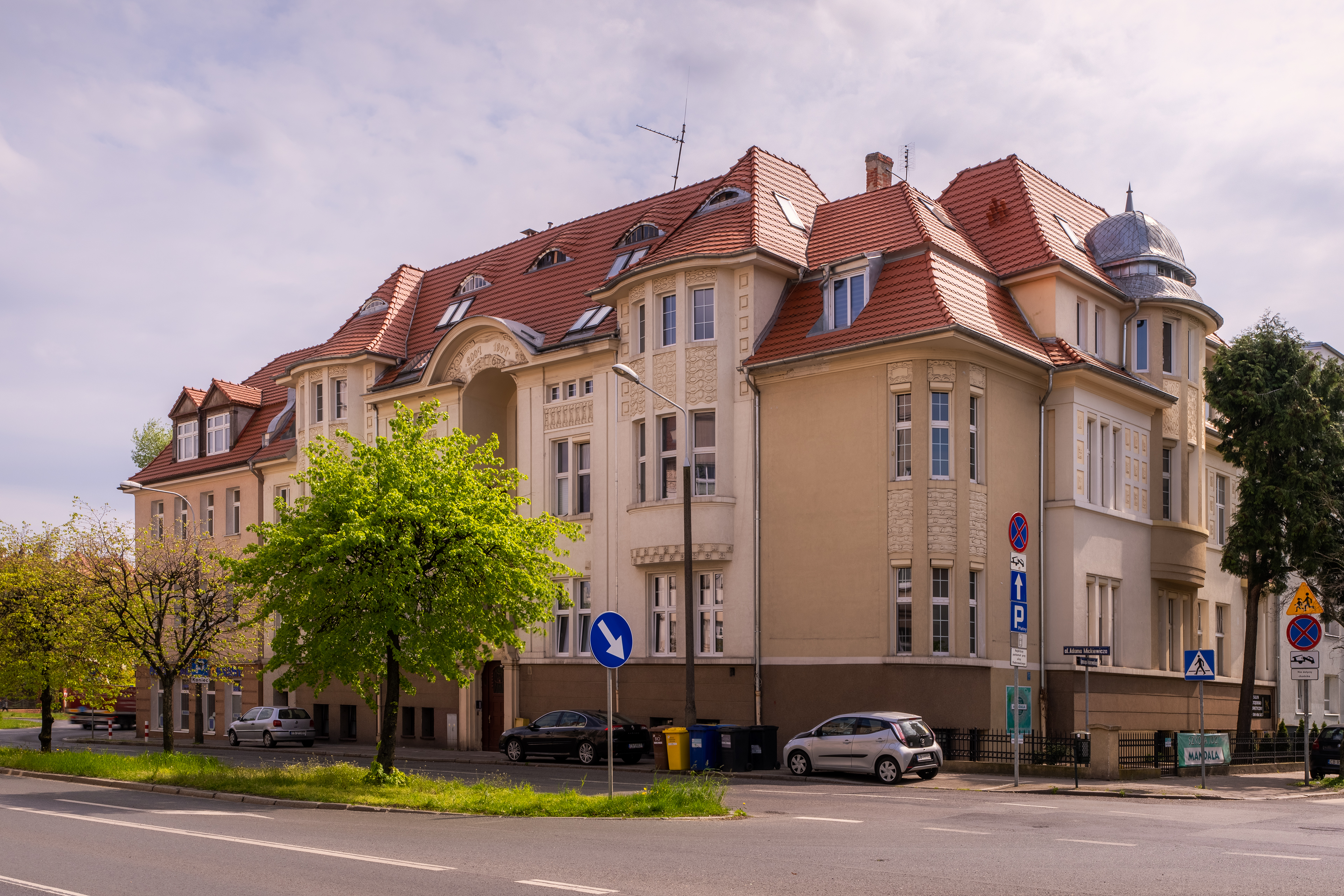
View of the frontage from Mickiewicz Alley

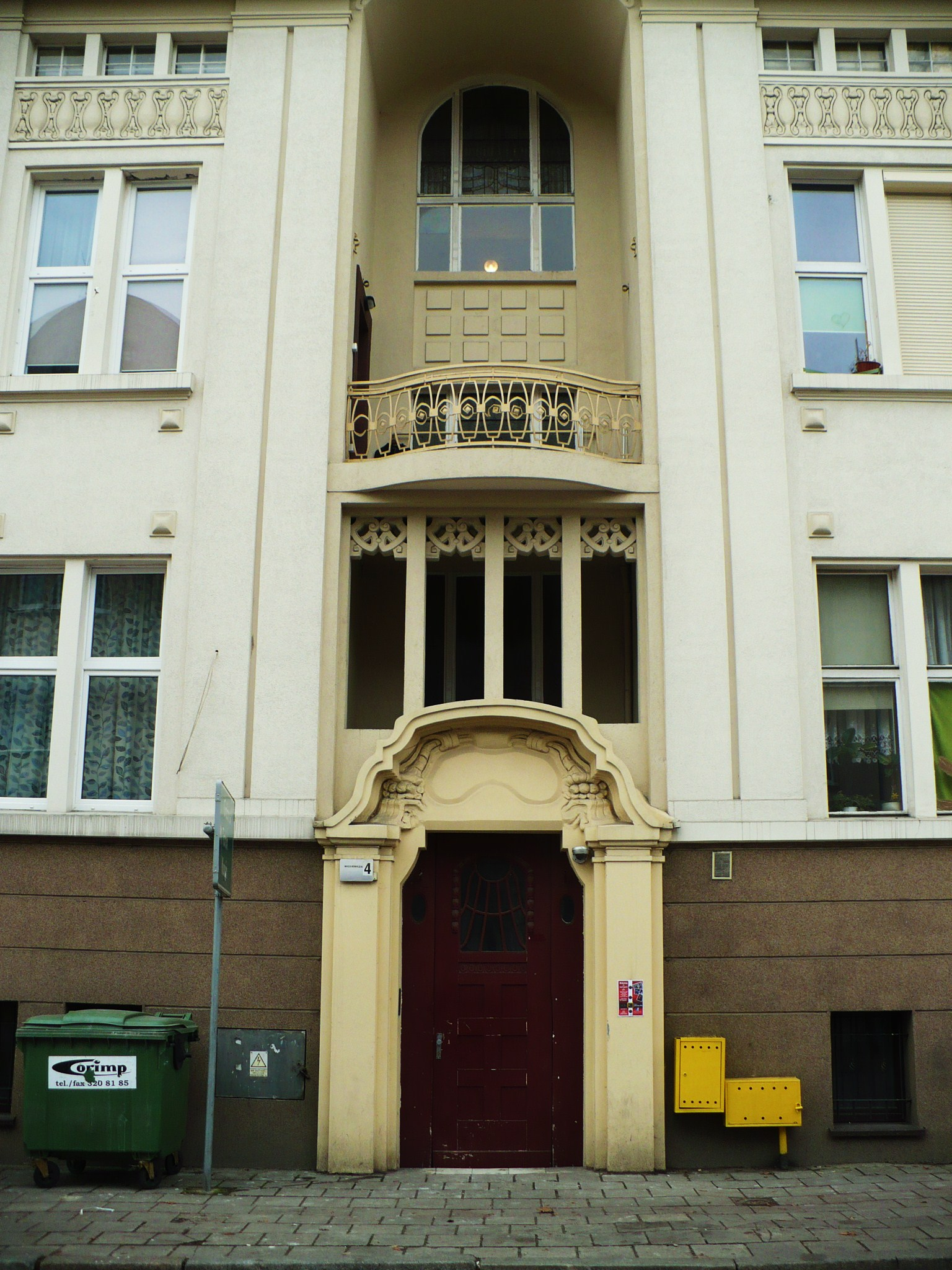
Detail of portal and loggia

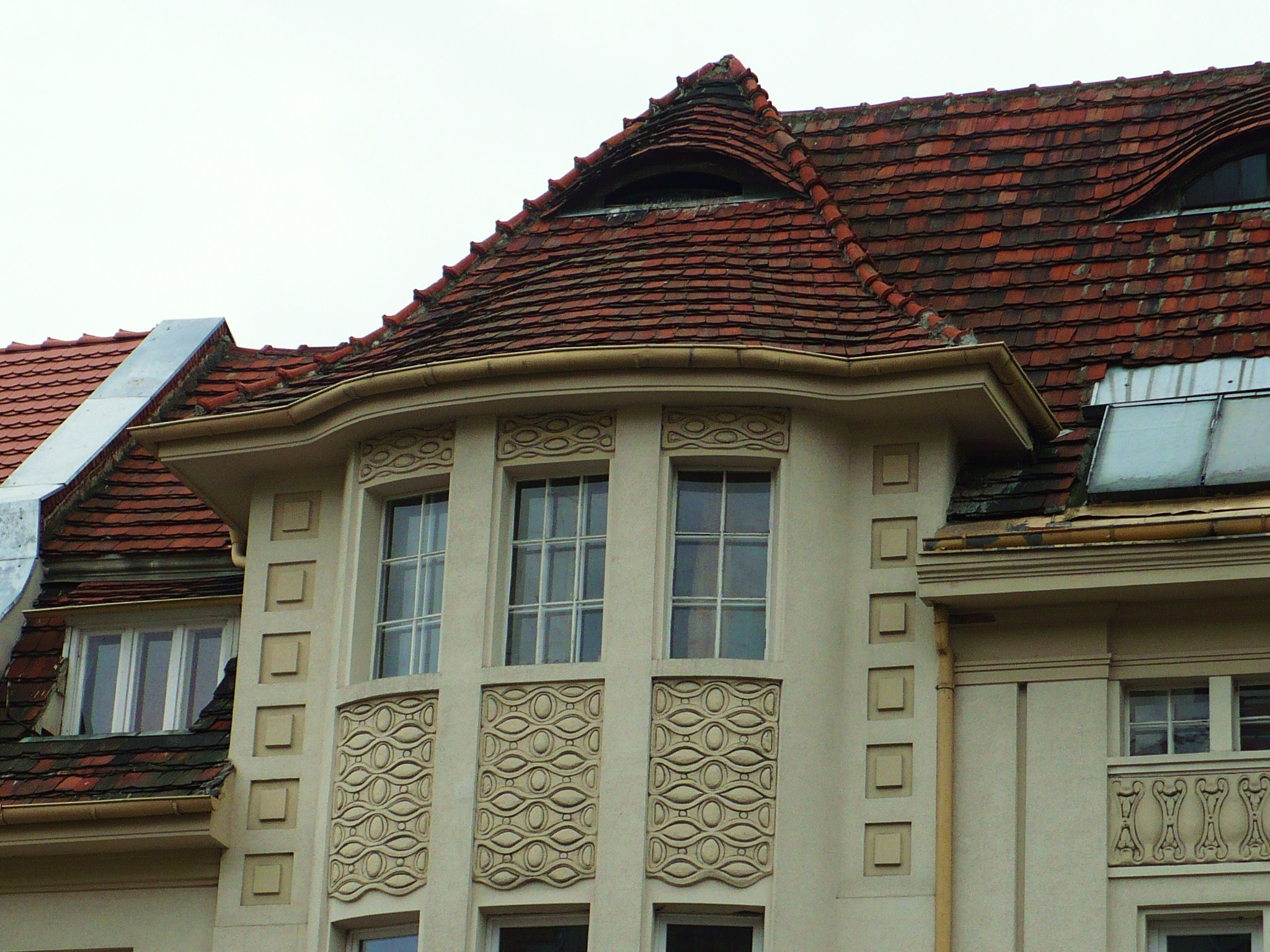
Detail of the gable with eyelid dormer

=== House at 5 ===
Registered on Kuyavian-Pomeranian Voivodeship heritage list, Nr.601378, Reg.A/1081 (December 21, 1994)

1906, by Rudolf Kern

Art Nouveau

The tenement was first ordered by Adolf Berger, a merchant.

Less adorned than its neighbours, this building displays anyhow the same Art Nouveau grandeur, with loggias and bay windows, as well as a curved top frontage and dormers on the gable.

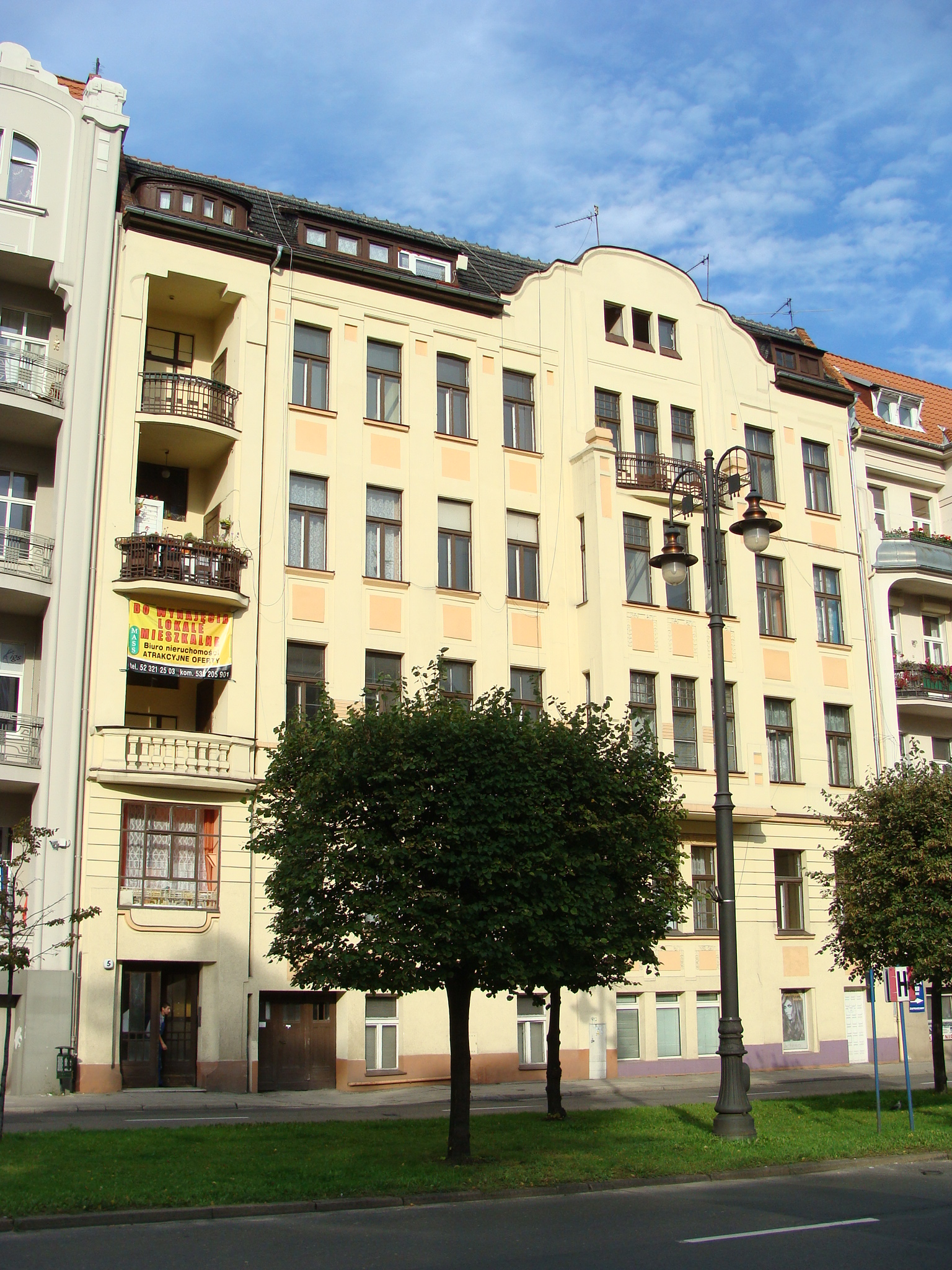
View of the frontage from Mickiewicz Alley

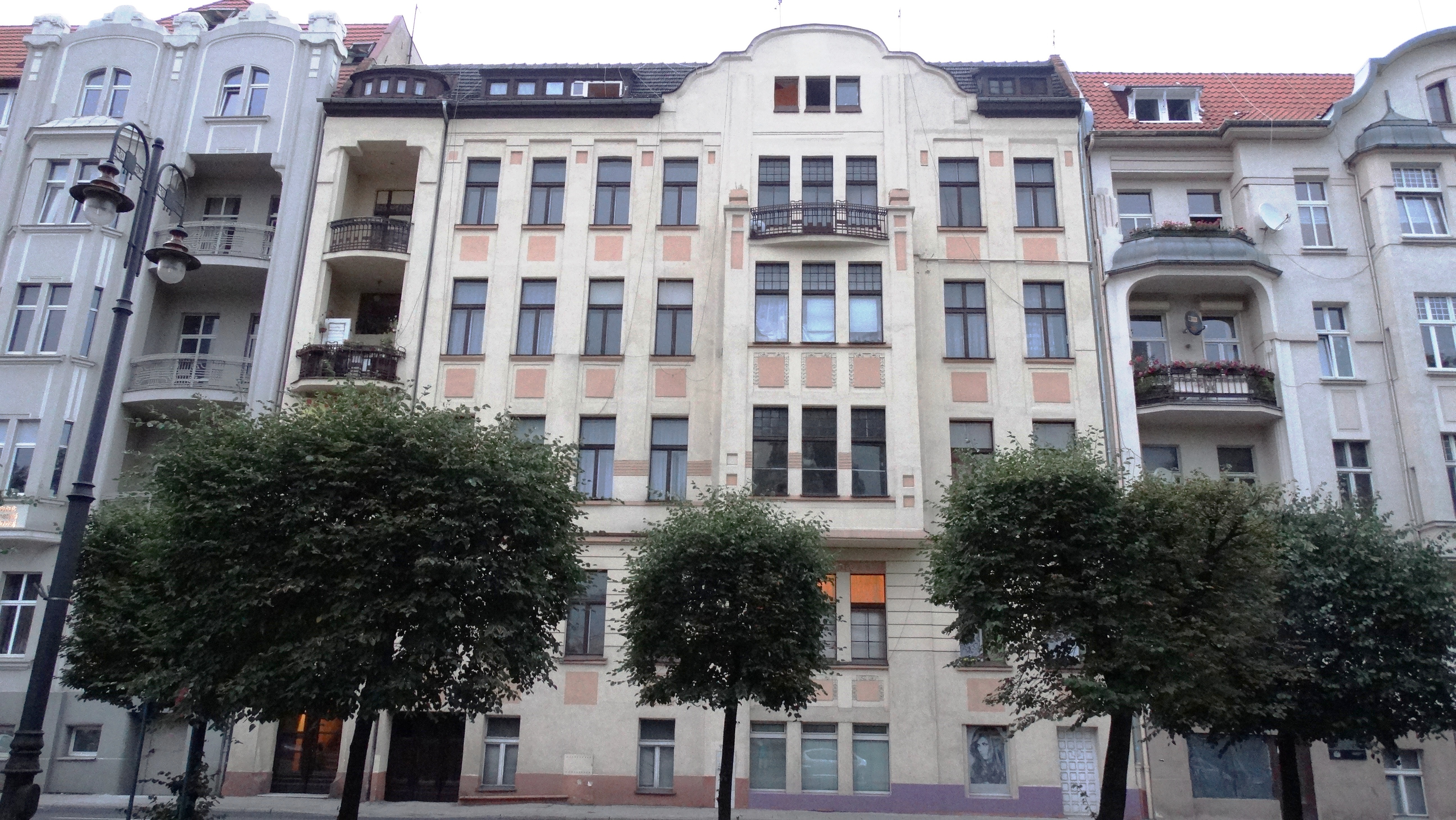
The house and its flanking neighbours

=== Rosenthal building at 7 ===
Registered on Kuyavian-Pomeranian Voivodeship heritage list, Nr.601379, Reg.A/1082 (January 10, 1995)

1904–1905, by Rudolf Kern

Art Nouveau

The tenement was commissioned by the brothers Rosentjal, Otto and Theodor, who also co-developed the project.

Nr.7 looks like a mirrored shape of Nr.5, underlying the seal of the same Art Nouveau architect. Frontage adornament is much richer, with loggias, balconies and bay windows topped by helmet-style roof.

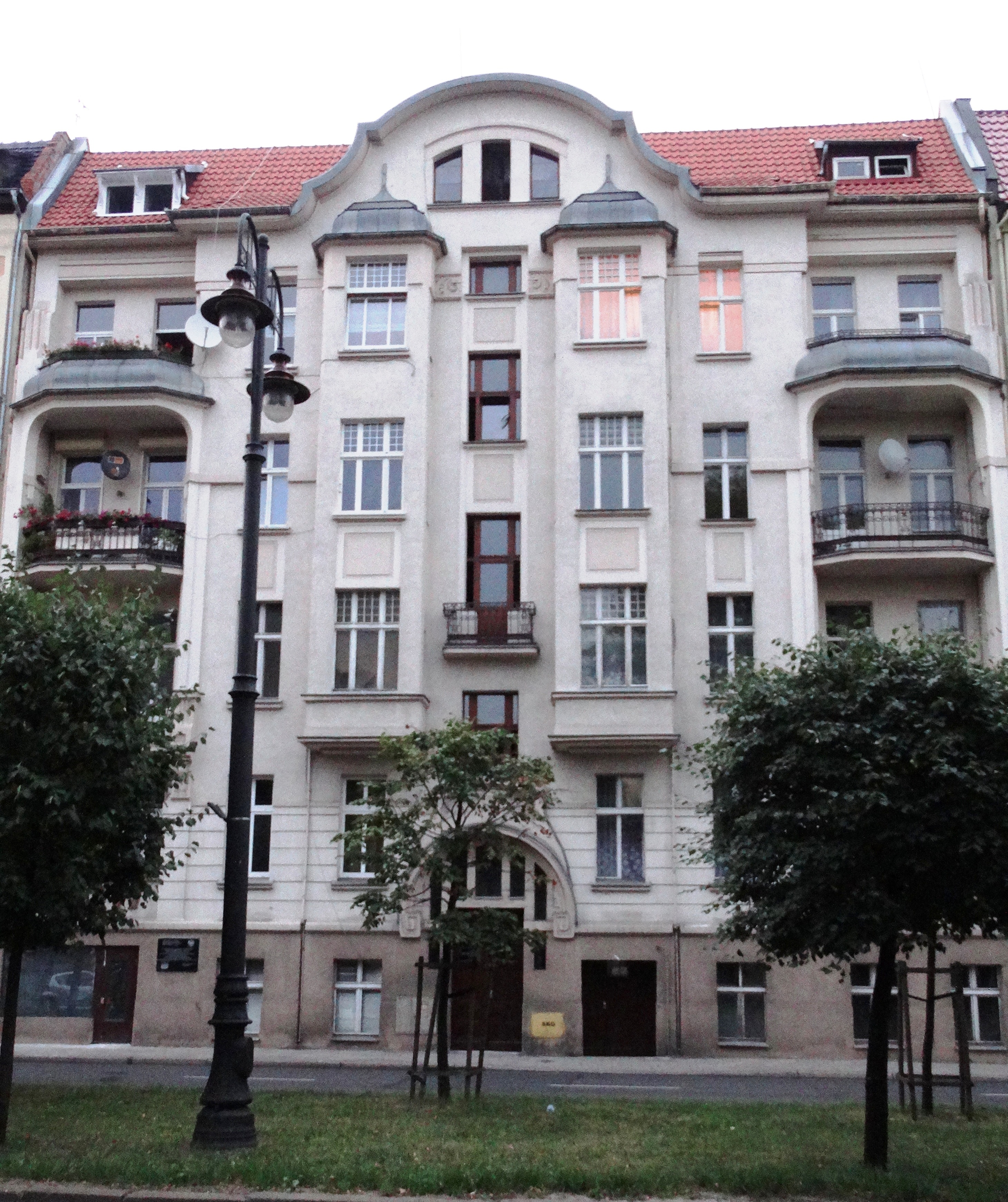
View of the frontage from Mickiewicz Alley

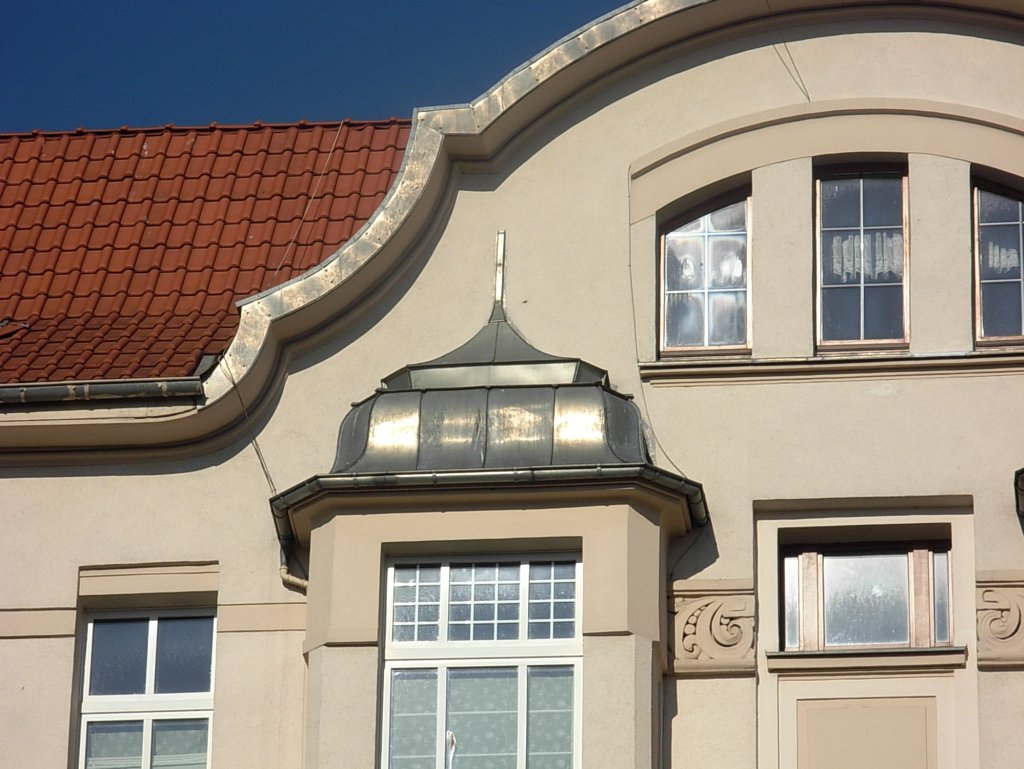
Detail of the roof

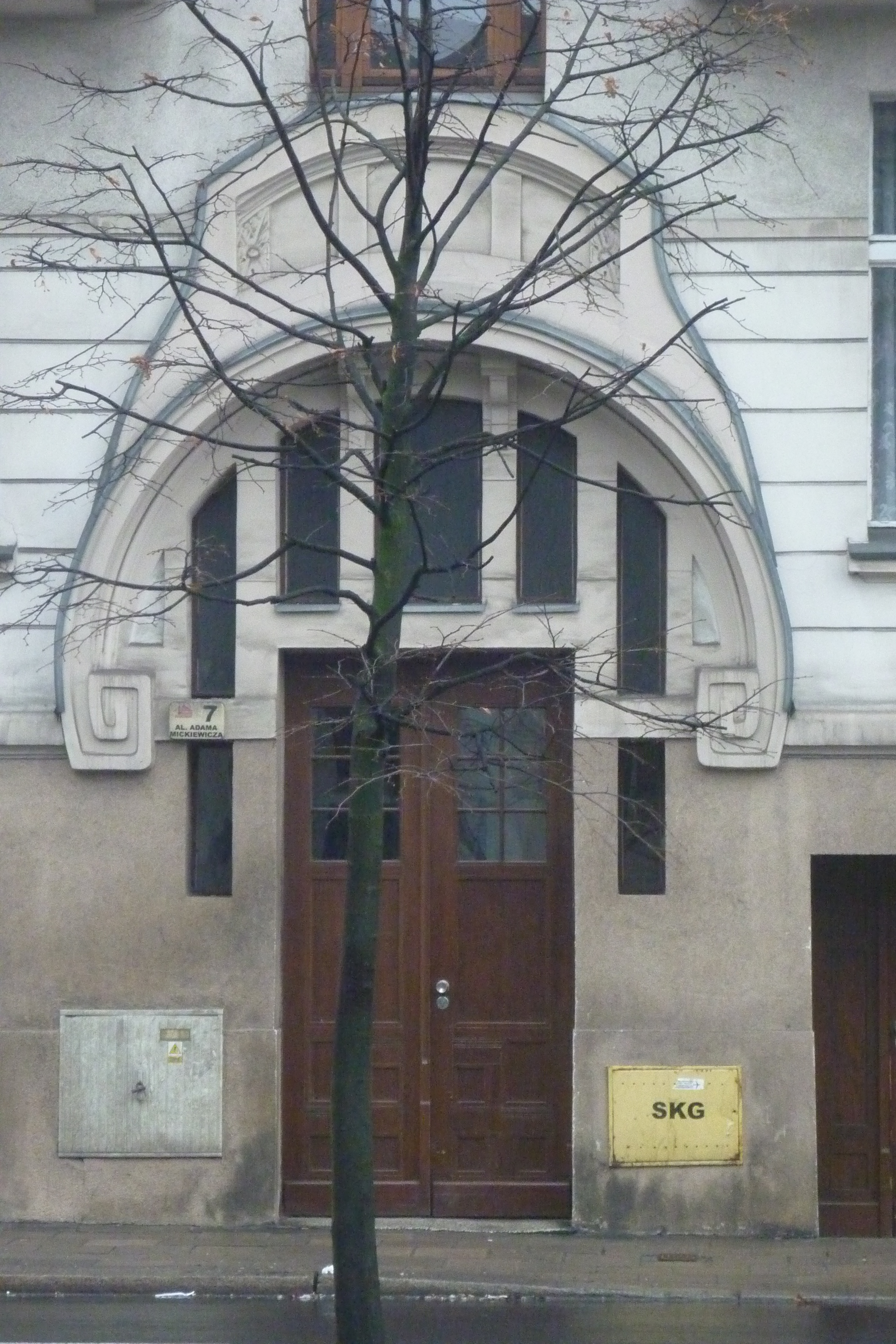
Gate at Nr.7

=== Tenement at 9 ===
Registered on Kuyavian-Pomeranian Voivodeship heritage list, Nr.601380-Reg.A/855 (August 28, 1985)

1905–1906, by Rudolf Kern

Art Nouveau

The house was built by Bydgoszcz architect Rudolf Kern so as to establish the first private music school in the city, the Conservatoire of Bydgoszcz (German: Bromberger Konservatorium der Musik). The school was founded in 1904 on the initiative of Arnold Schattschneider and was originally located at Gdańska Street 24, (German: Dantzigerstrasse 158). The space in the building was soon too scarce, and decision was made to build a new edifice at Adam Mickiewicz Alley, using the opportunity of the urban development of the "Hempelscher Feldethe" area. Construction lasted from December 1905 to October 1906 when an opening concert took place for the opening of the new school premises.

The building displays Art Nouveau style, using rich decorative forms. The facade is balanced with vertical and horizontal lines as well as balconies having each their own designed railing. The main entrance had two doors: one leading to the staircase to the conservatoroire, the other going to private spaces for the landlord and the school headmaster. Inside, the school housed classrooms, instruments, an extensive library and a concert hall with Neo-Baroque features. In the concert hall was organized symphonic concerts, chamber music events, concerts of students and monthly subscription concerts. In smaller venues were classes for piano, violin, cello and choral singing. Teachers of the conservatoire came from Vienna, Dresden, Regensburg, Prague, Rome, Moscow and Warsaw, classes comprised Germans and Poles. Wilhelm von Winterfeld, second director since 1914, had the school moved in the early 1930s to larger premises at Gdańska Street, 54 (from where it moved again to Gdańska Street 71 in 1939). The interiors of the building in Adam Mickiewicz Alley have been entirely rebuilt to turn classrooms and auditorium into flats. In 2002-2004 a major renovation of the facade has been carried out, giving back to the frontage its original design that had been lost since the postwar period.

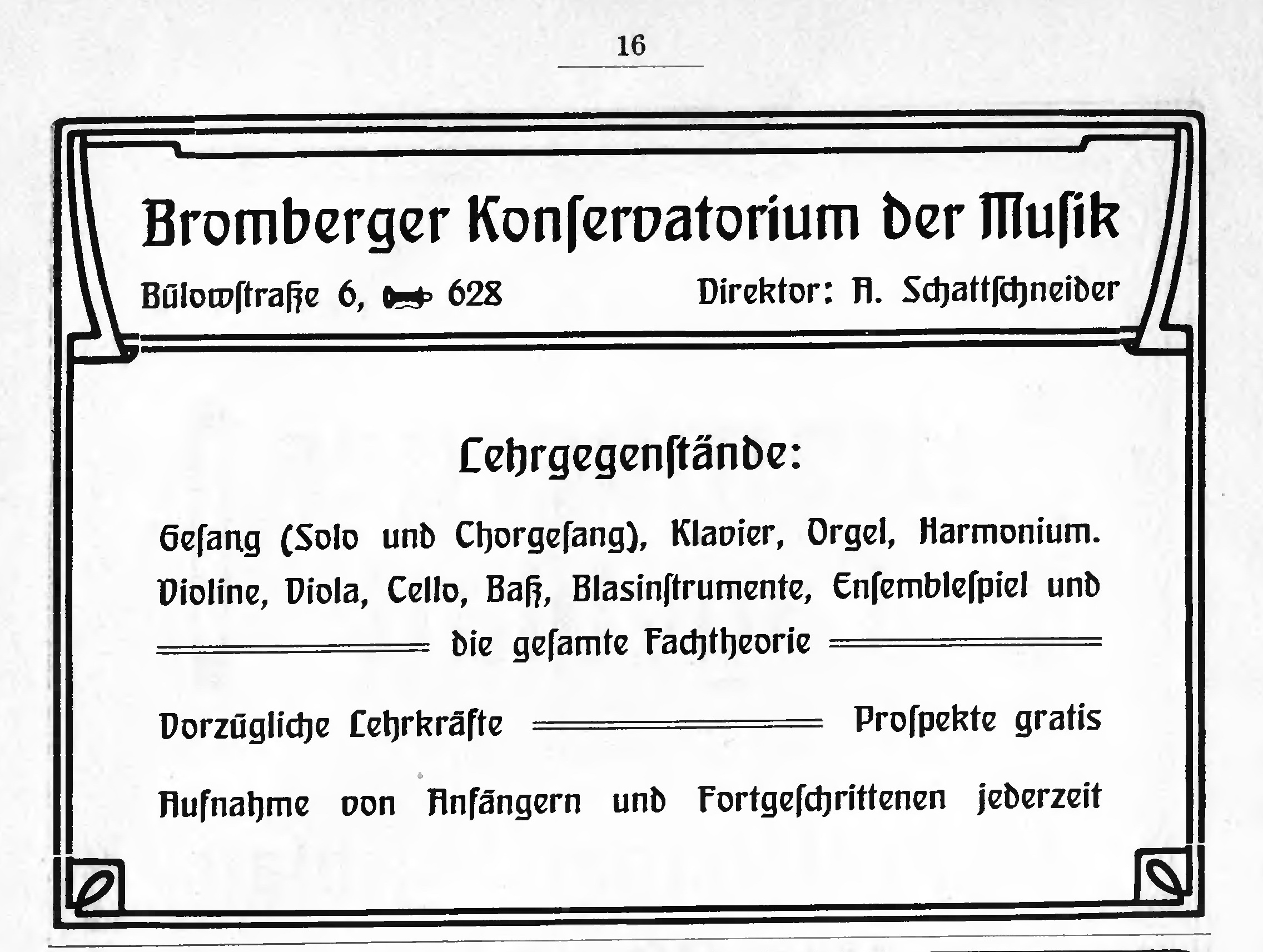
Advert. for Bydgoszcz Music Conservatoire ca 1906

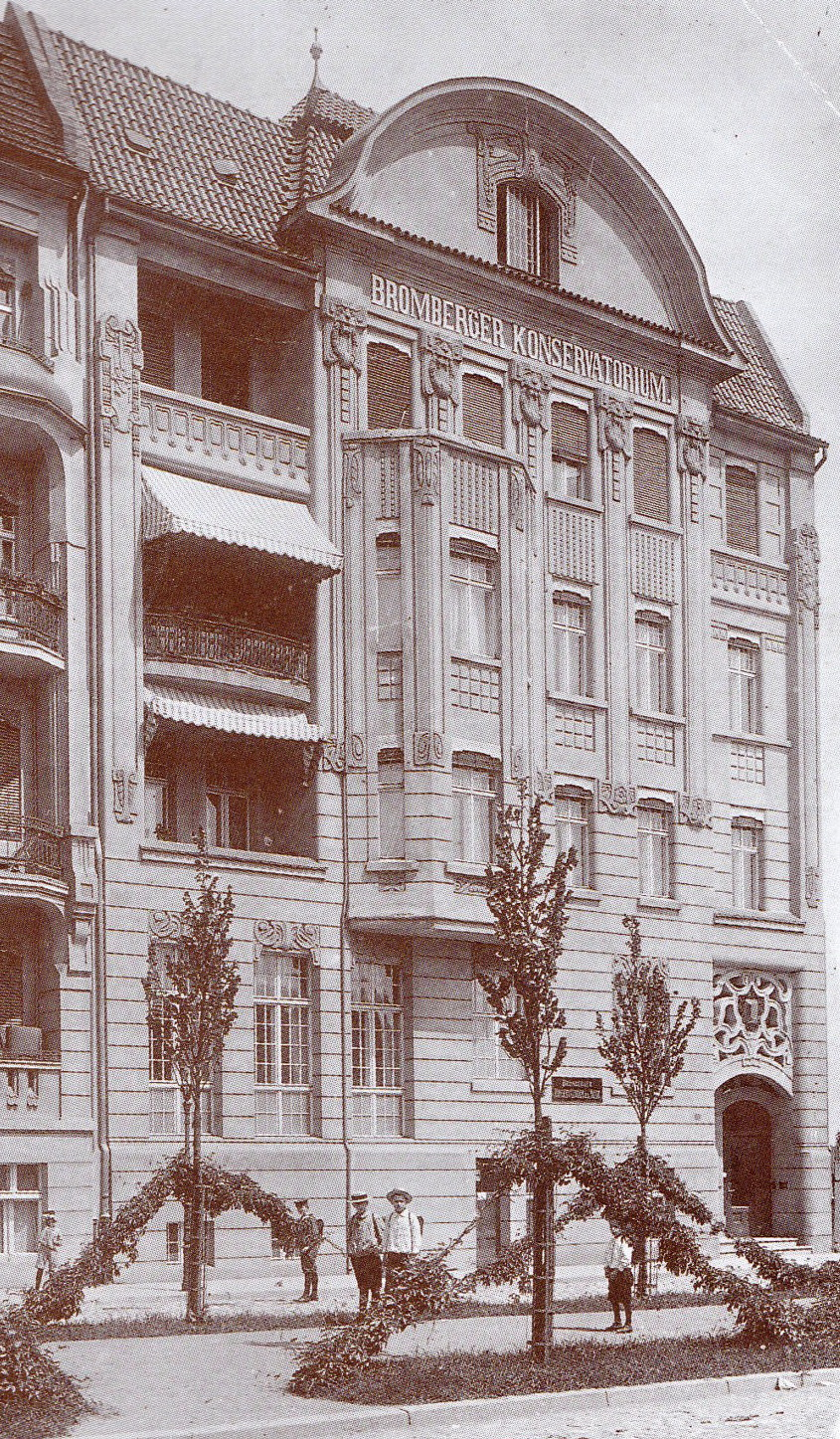
View ca 1915, as "Bromberger Konservatorium"

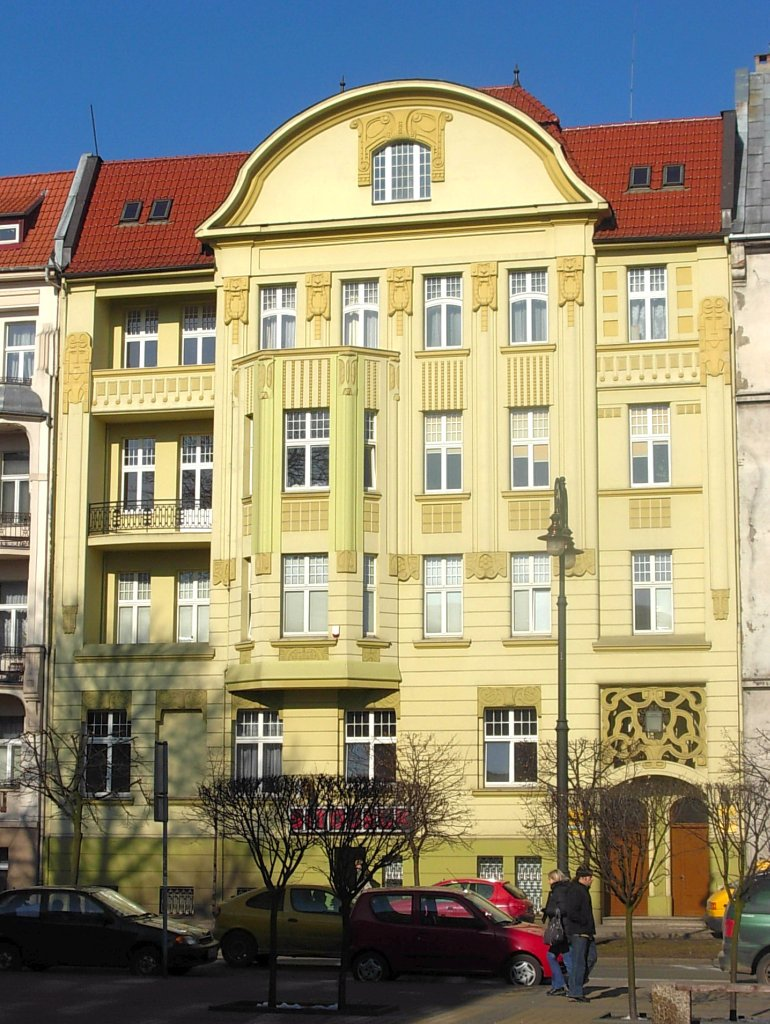
Frontage view from the street

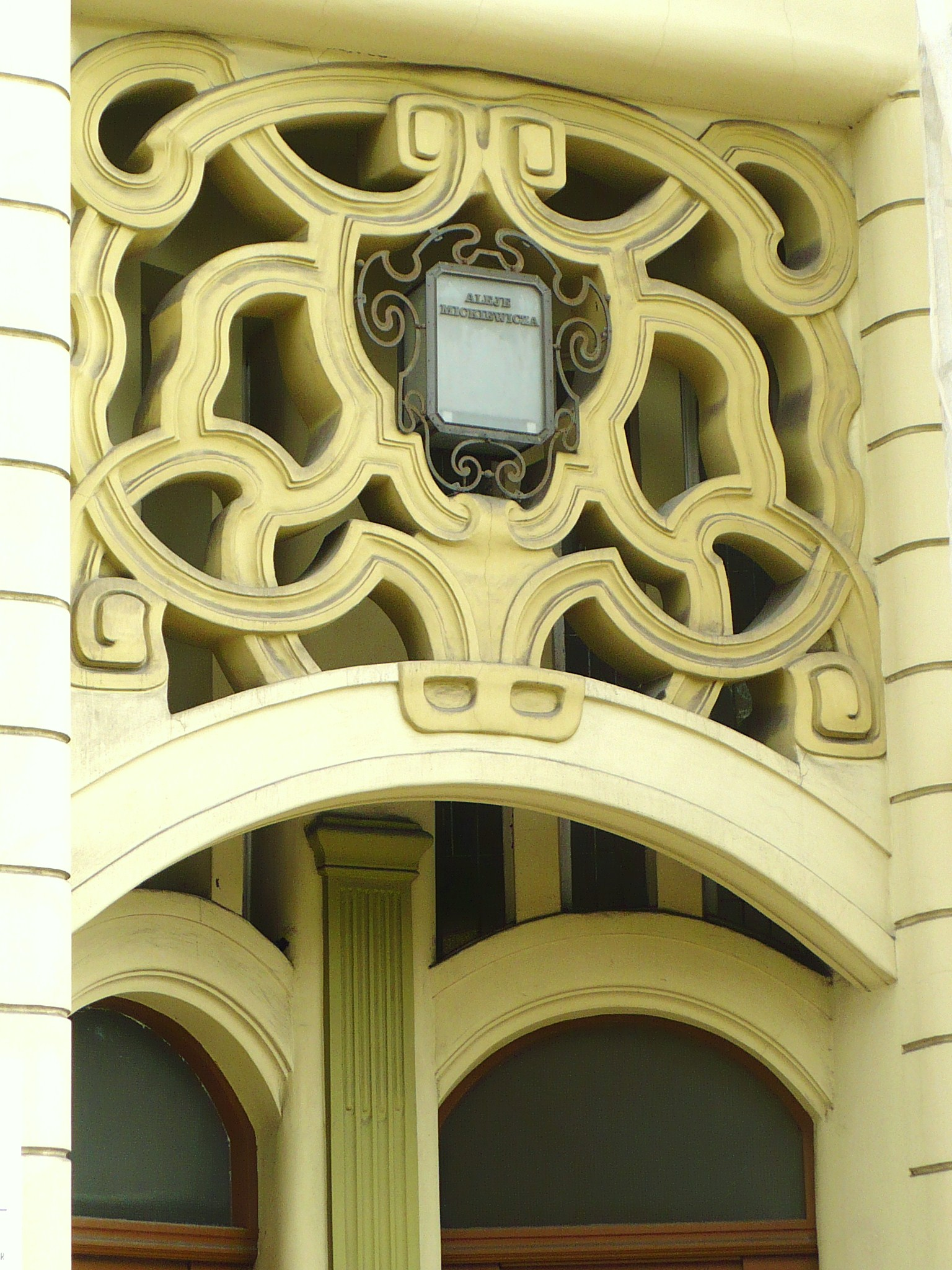
Art Nouveau ornamentation above the portal

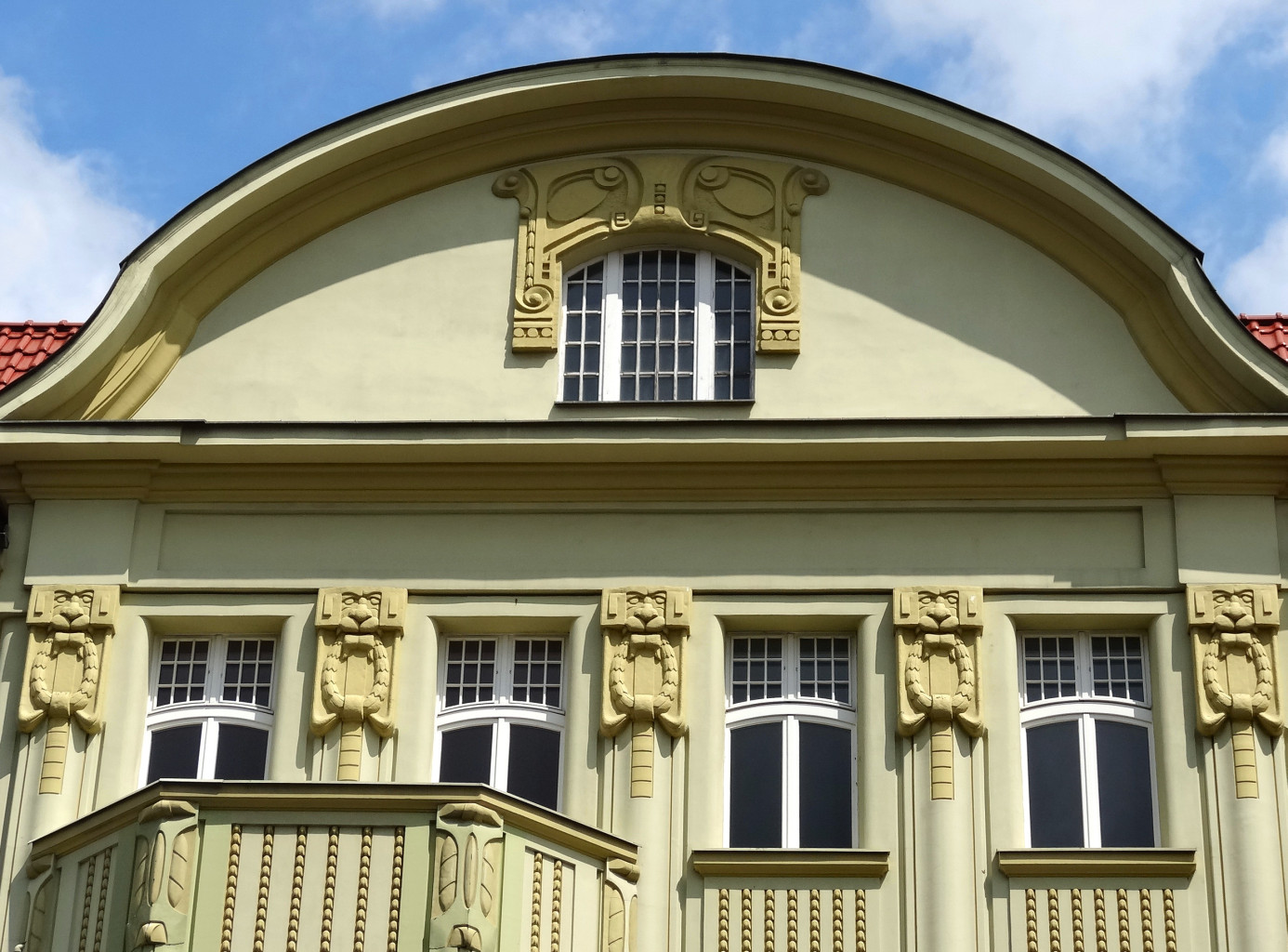
Stucco decor of the top level

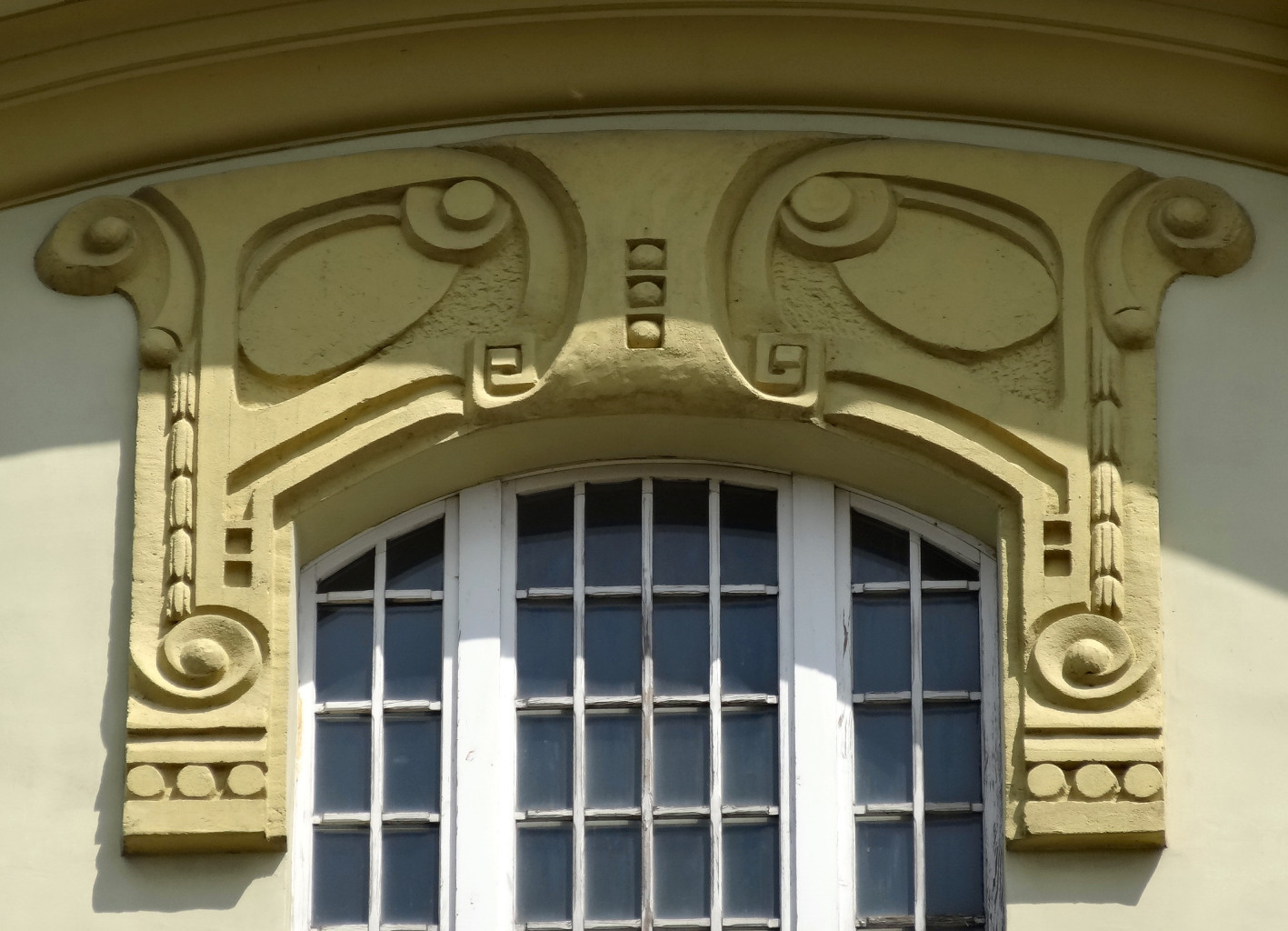
Window's adornment
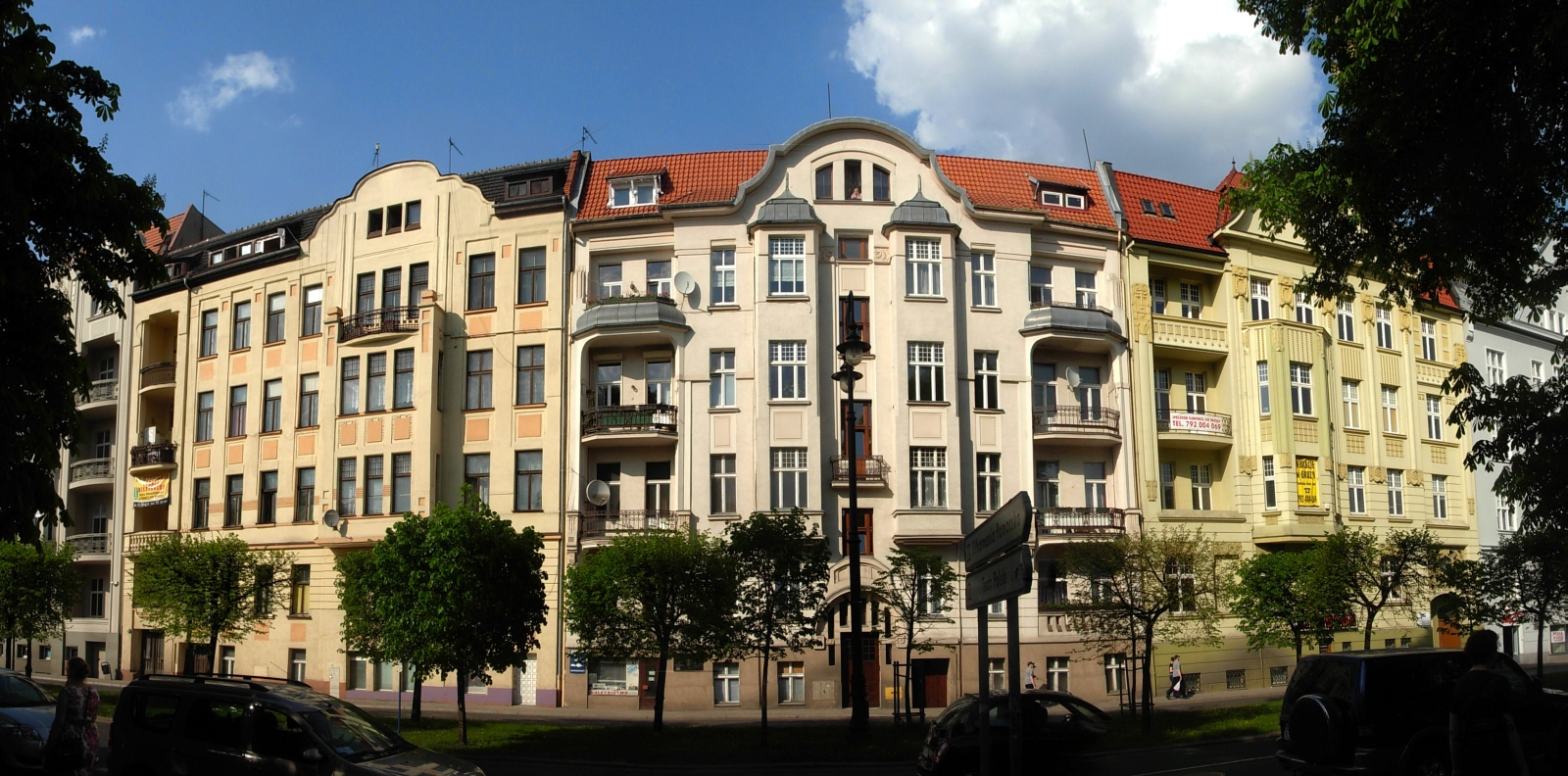
Panorama of facades, with Nr.5 (left), 7 (center), 9 (right)

=== Corner house with January 20, 1920 street ===
Registered on Kuyavian-Pomeranian Voivodeship heritage list, Nr.601456-Reg.A/1080/1-2 (December 20, 1994)

1905-1906

Art Nouveau

This corner house is characterised by its towering peak topped with a tin roof.

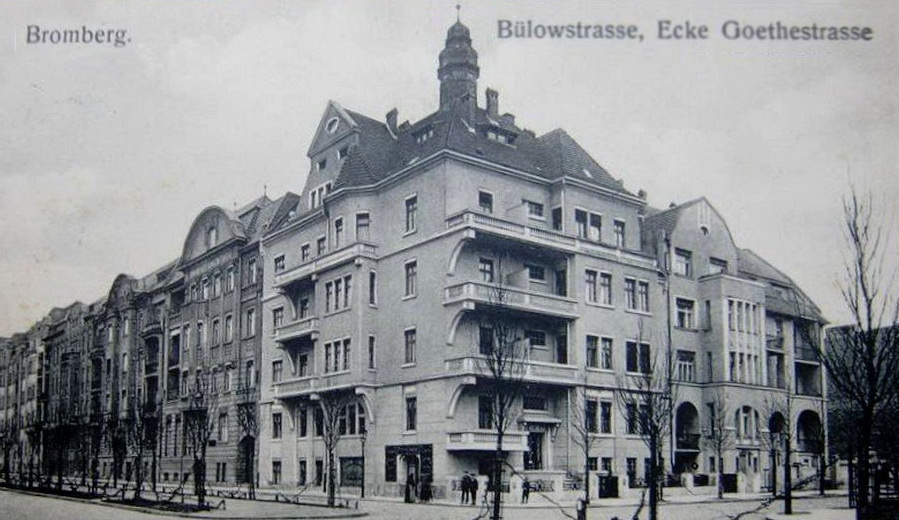
View ca 1914

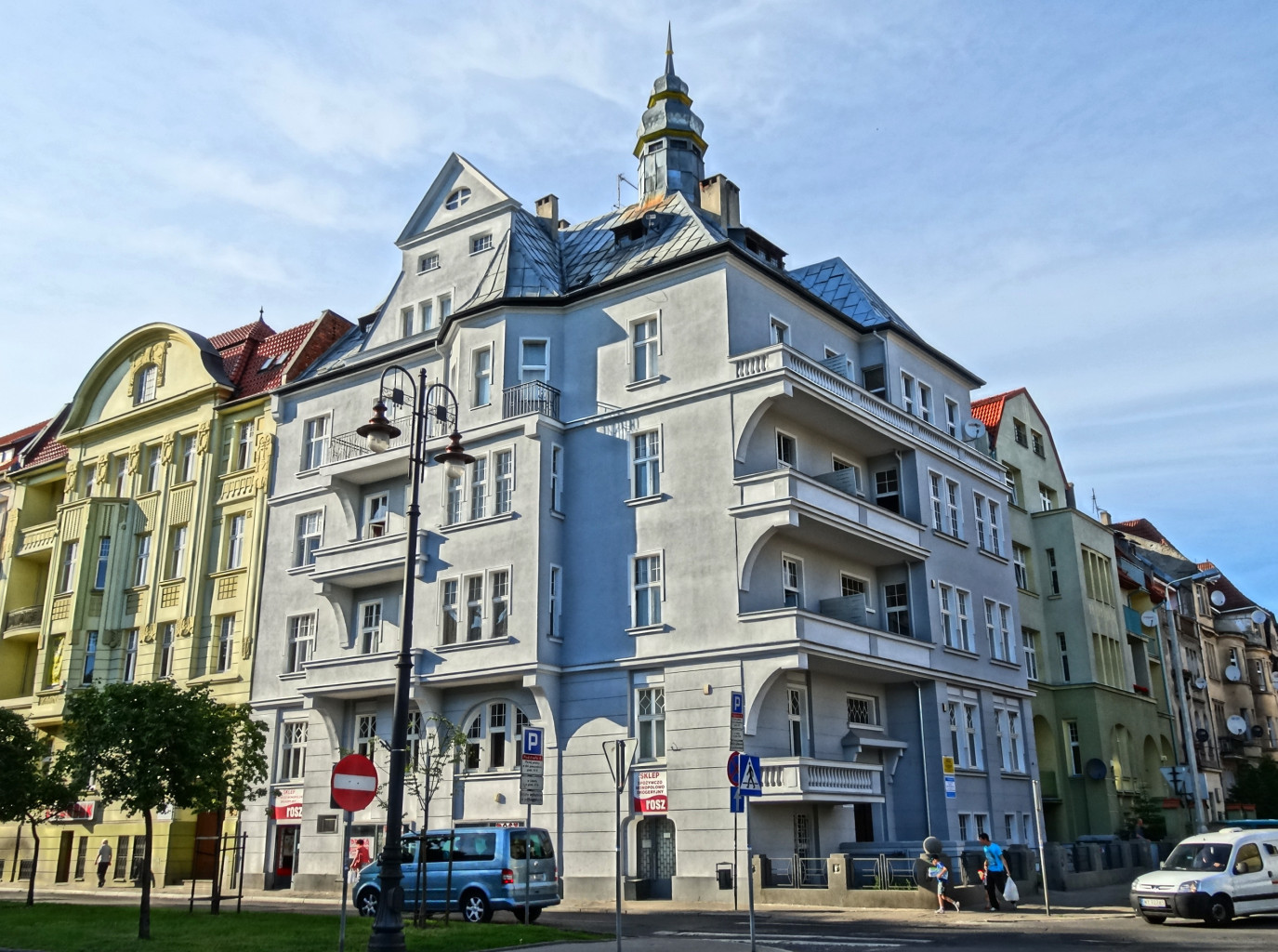
General view of both frontages

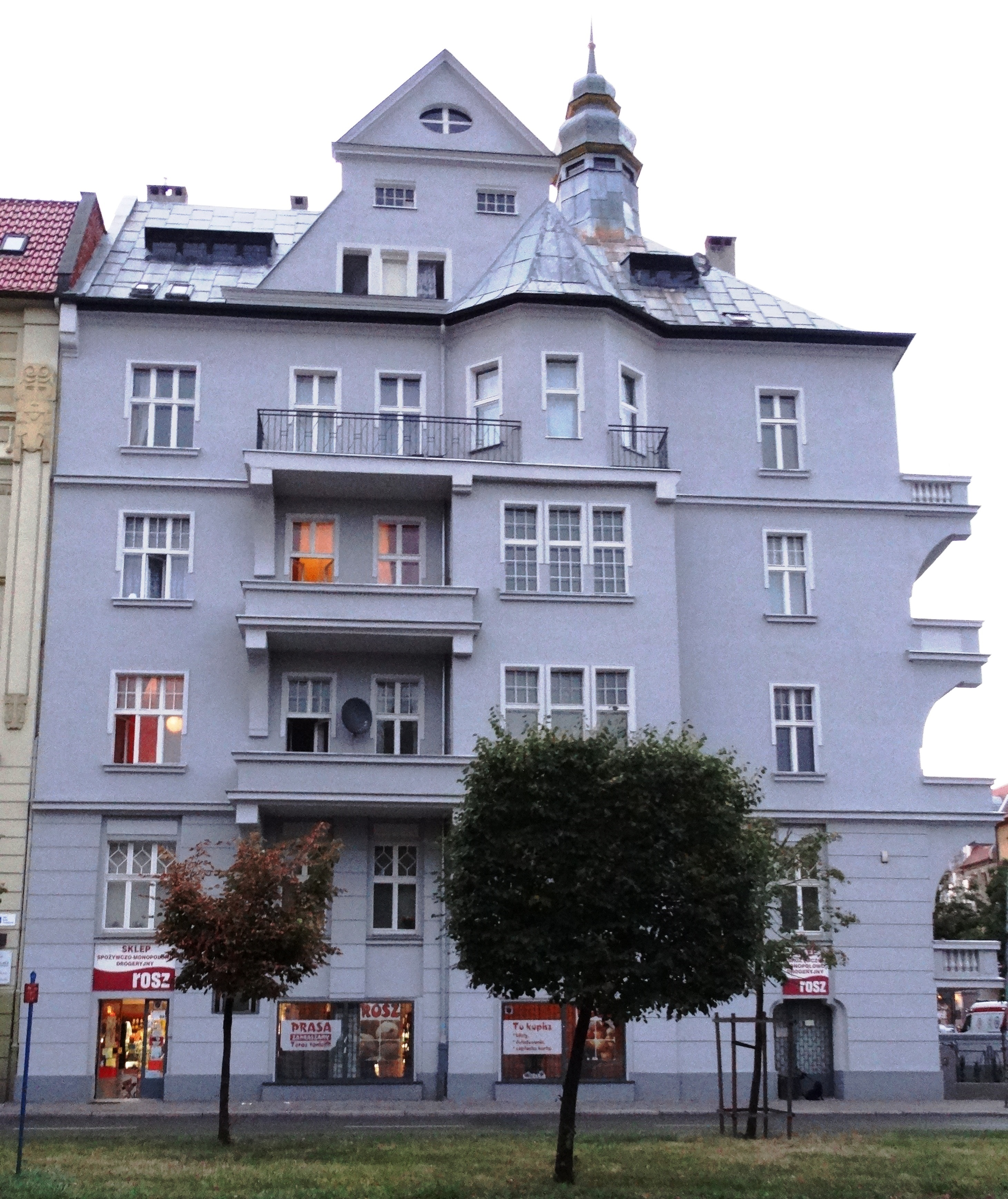
Facade on Mickiewicz Alley

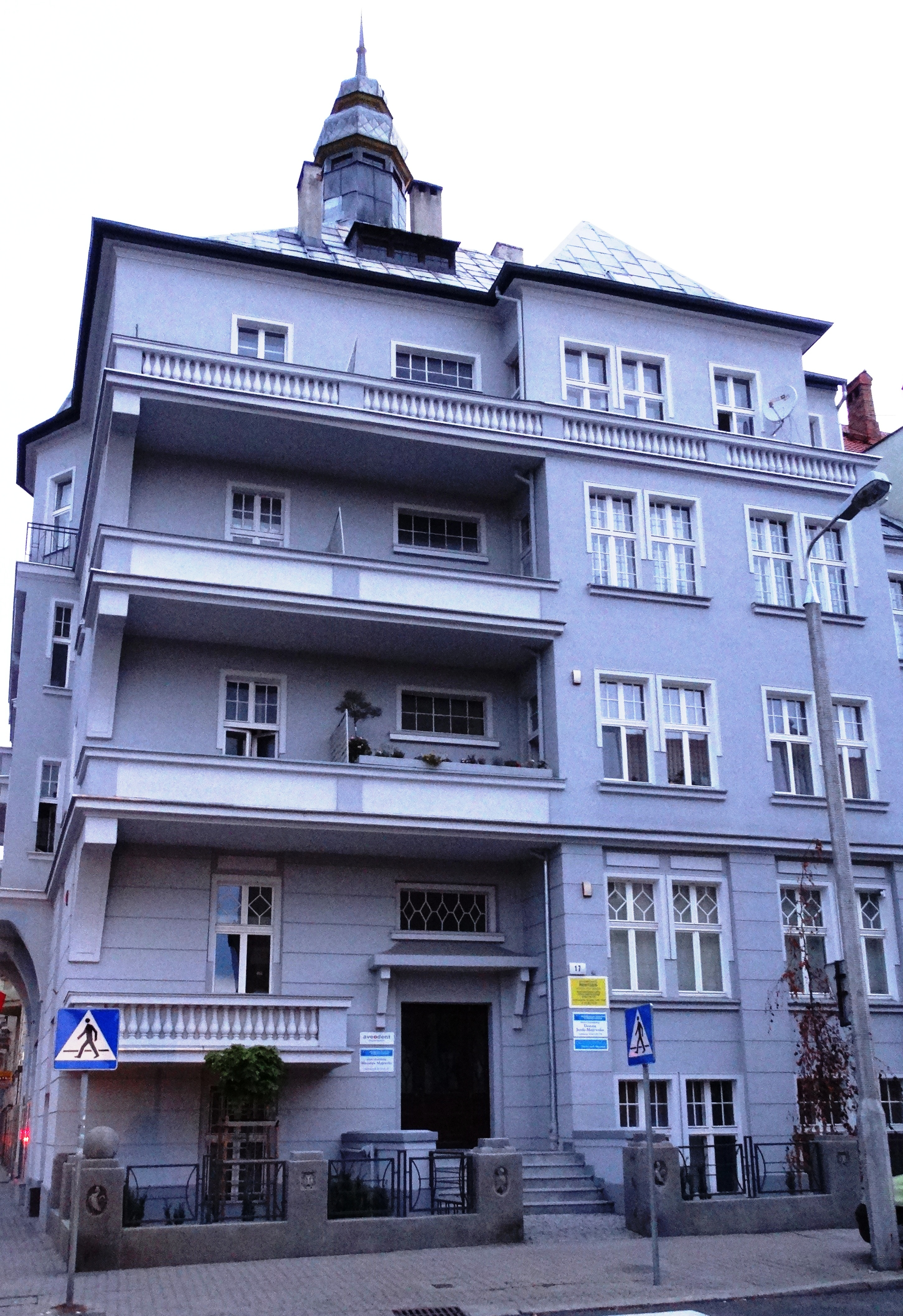
Facade on January 20, 1920, street

=== Corner house with January 20, 1920 street ===
1903

Art Nouveau

This corner house displays also a nice adorned portal.

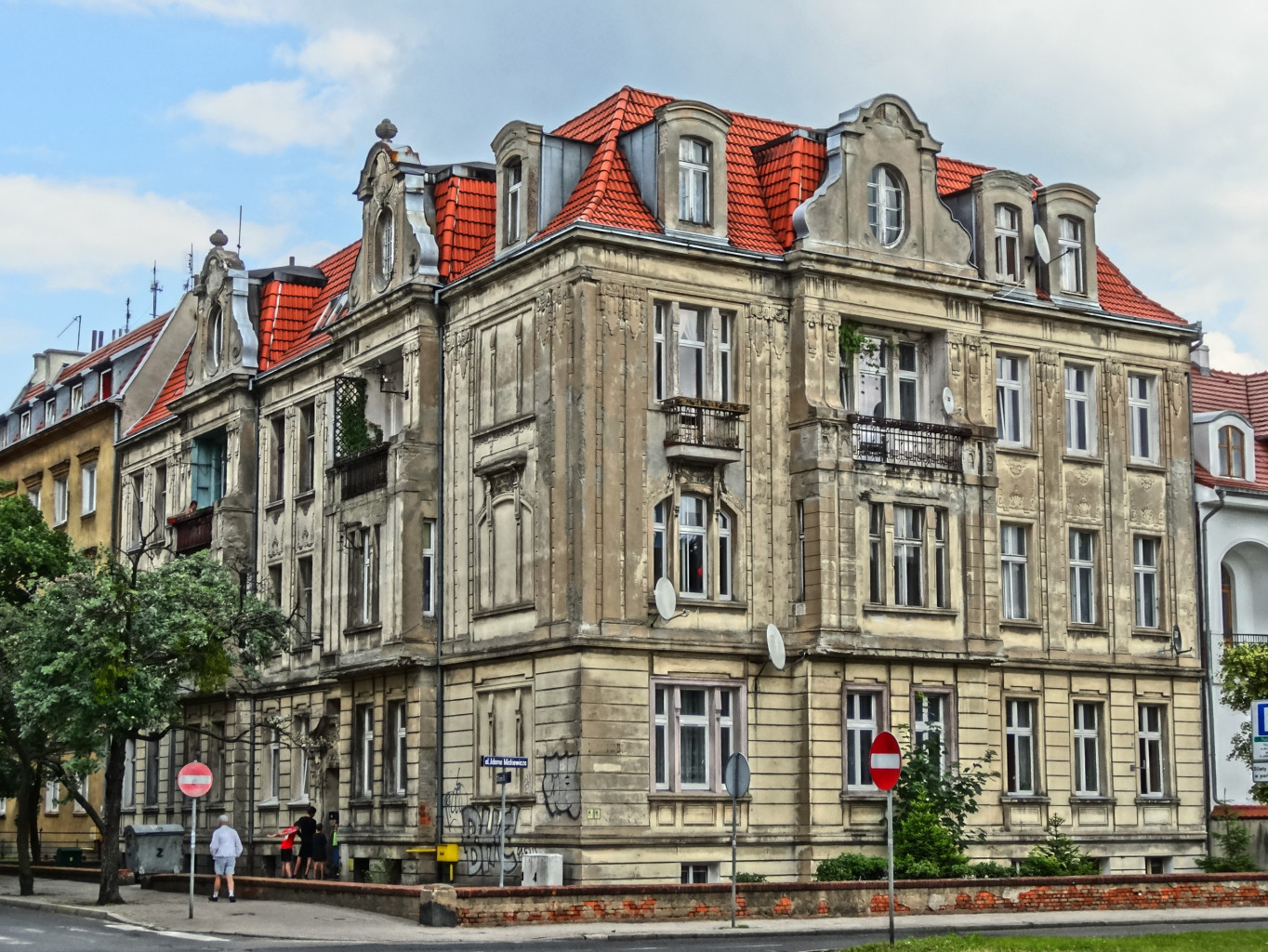
General view of both frontages

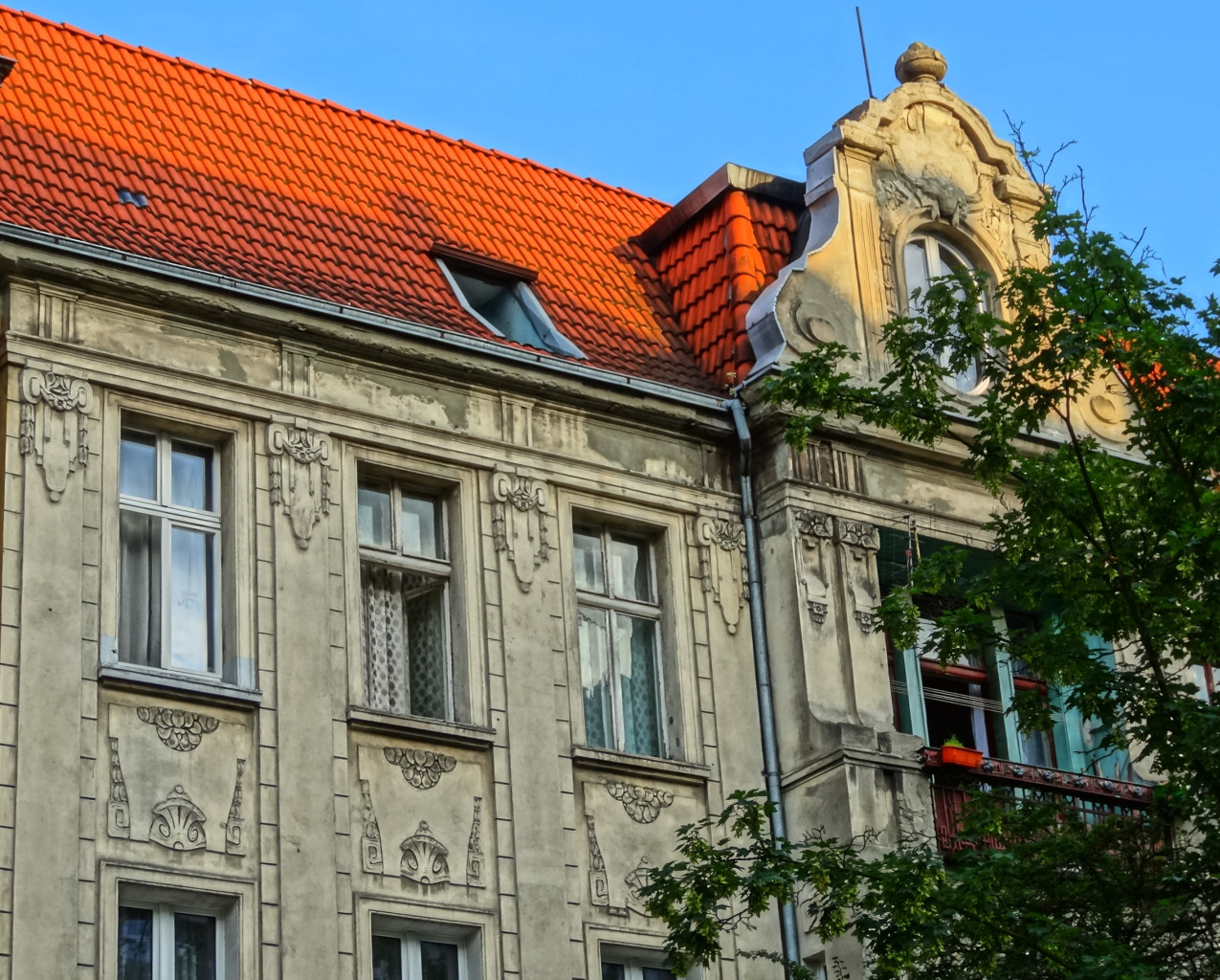
Detailed view of facade decoration

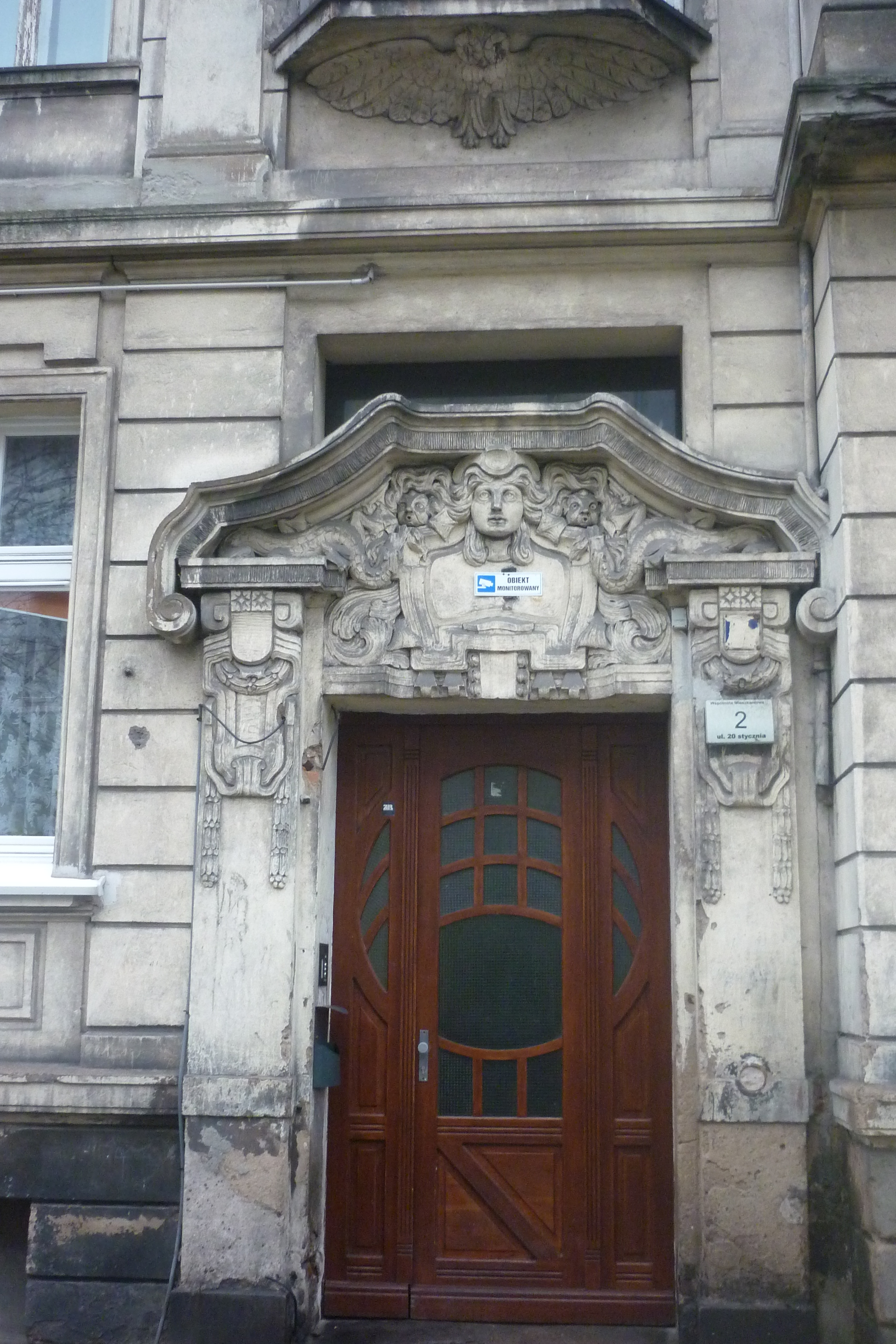
Detail of the gate ornamentation

=== Villa at 11 ===
1903–1904, by Ludwig Otto Wirpelius.

Art Nouveau

One of the few villas built during the initial development of the street.

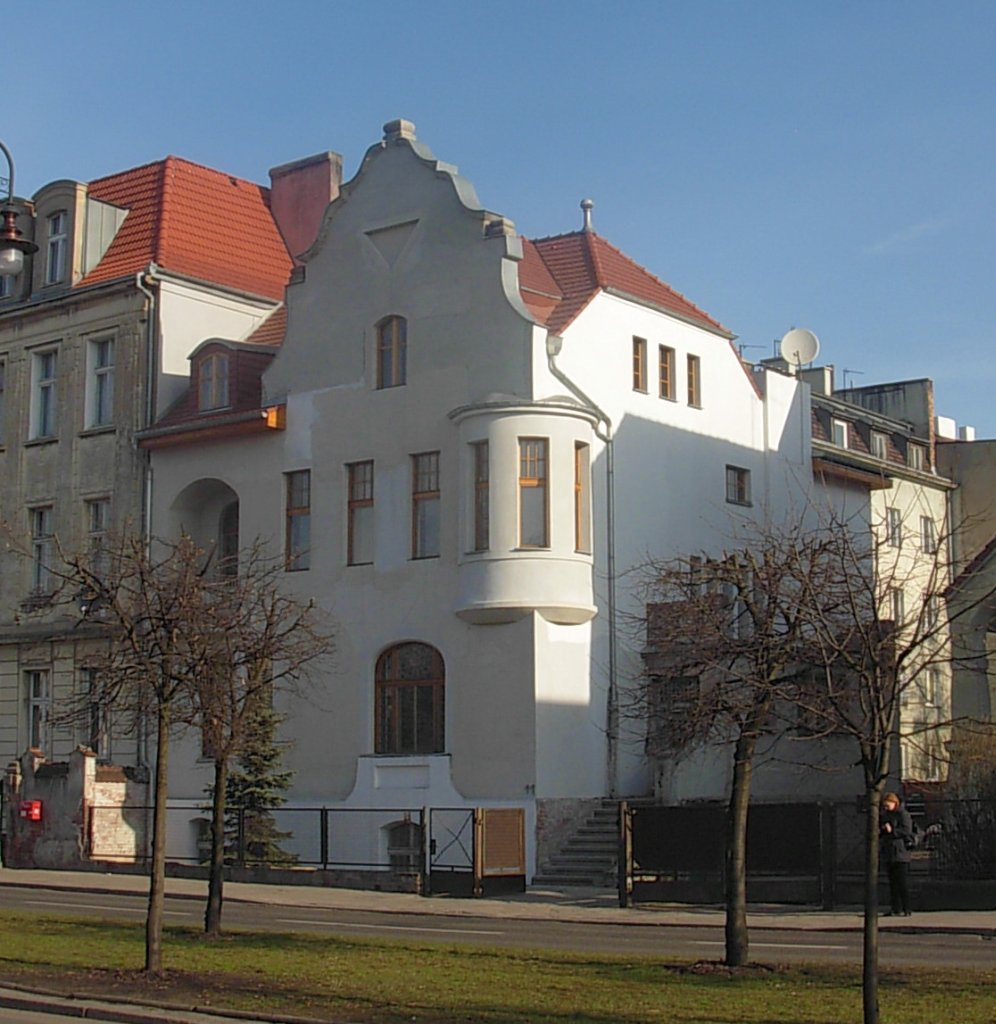
General view of the villa

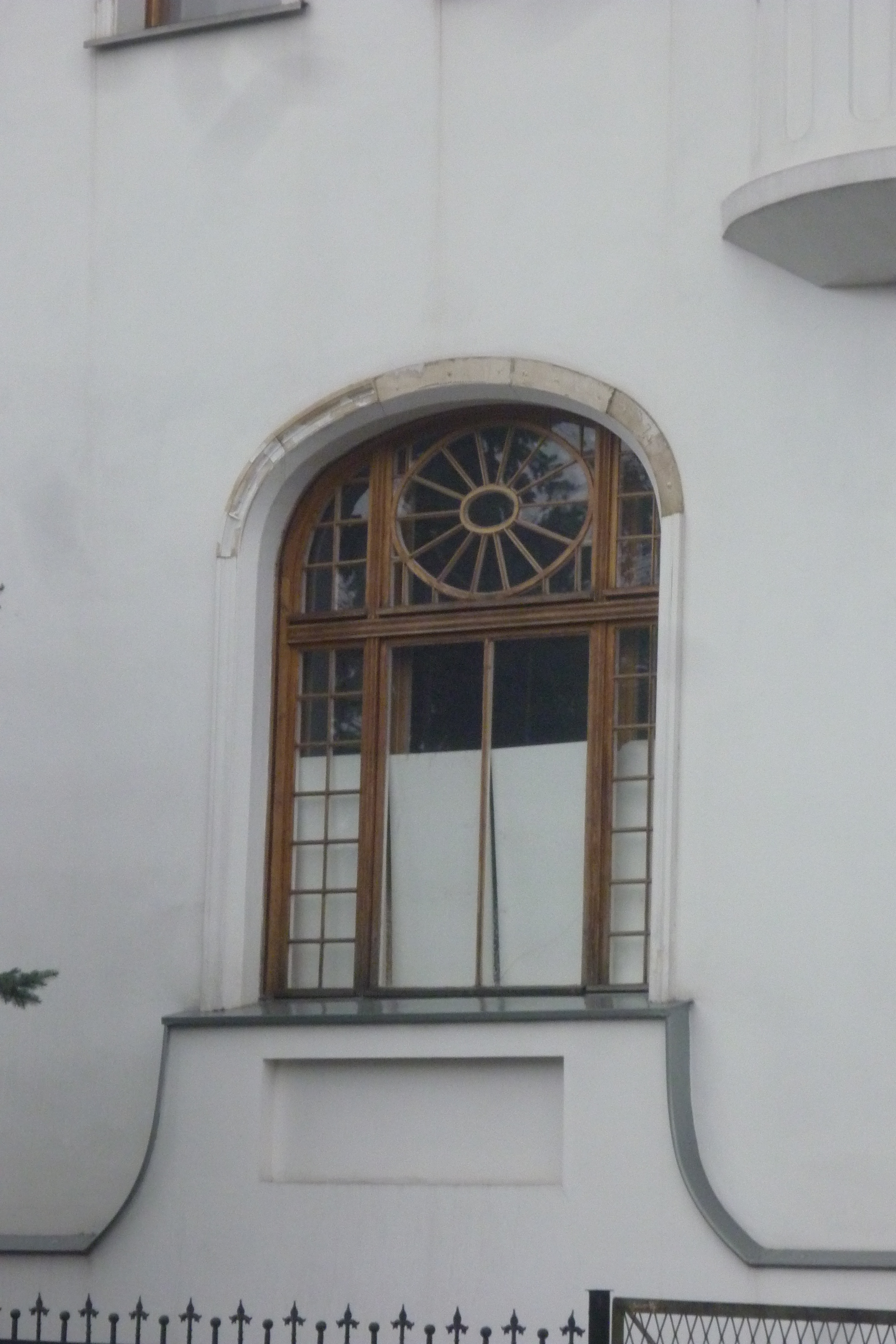
Detail of a facade window

=== Villas at 13/15 ===
Registered on Kuyavian-Pomeranian Voivodeship Heritage List, Nr.6601381-Reg. A/1067 (May 18, 1994)

1903–1904, by Rudolf Kern.

Art Nouveau

One of the few villas built during the initial development of the street, both commissioned by Julius Berger, a merchant. During the interwar period, the villa at Nr.15 housed a clinic run by Dr. Staemmler., while in the house at Nr.13 lived Henryk Weynerowski and his family.

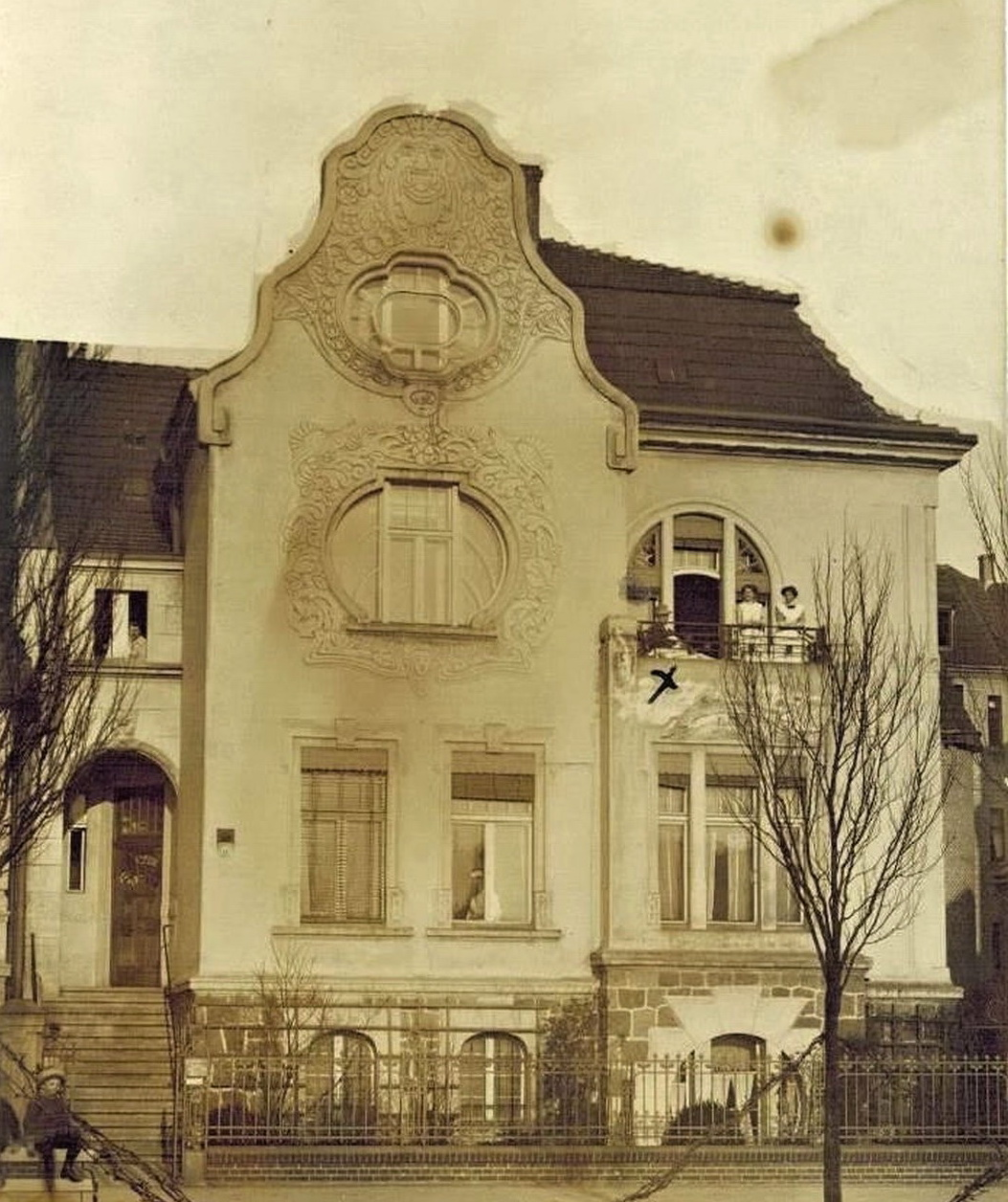
Villa at Nr.15 in 1912

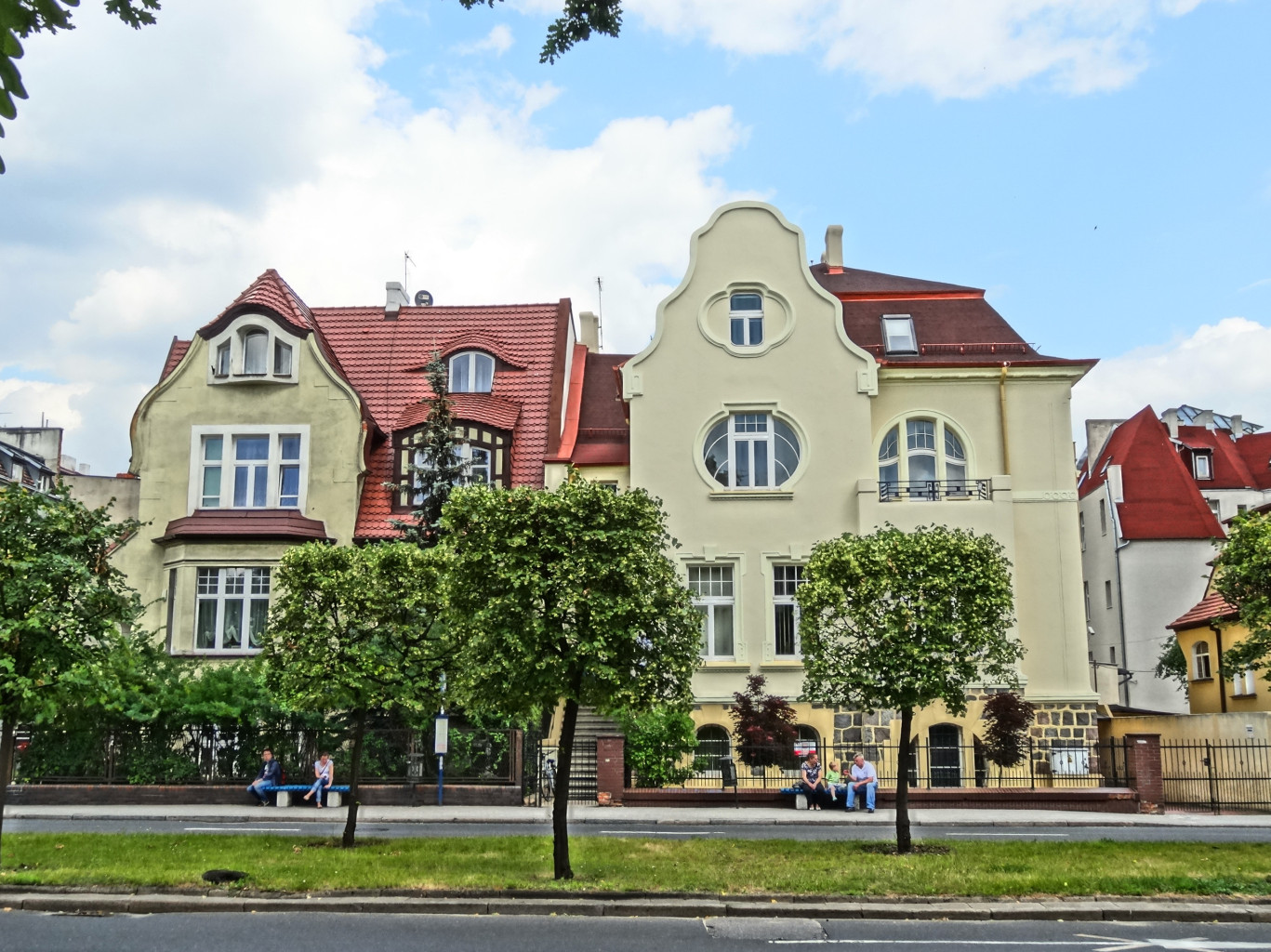
General view of villas

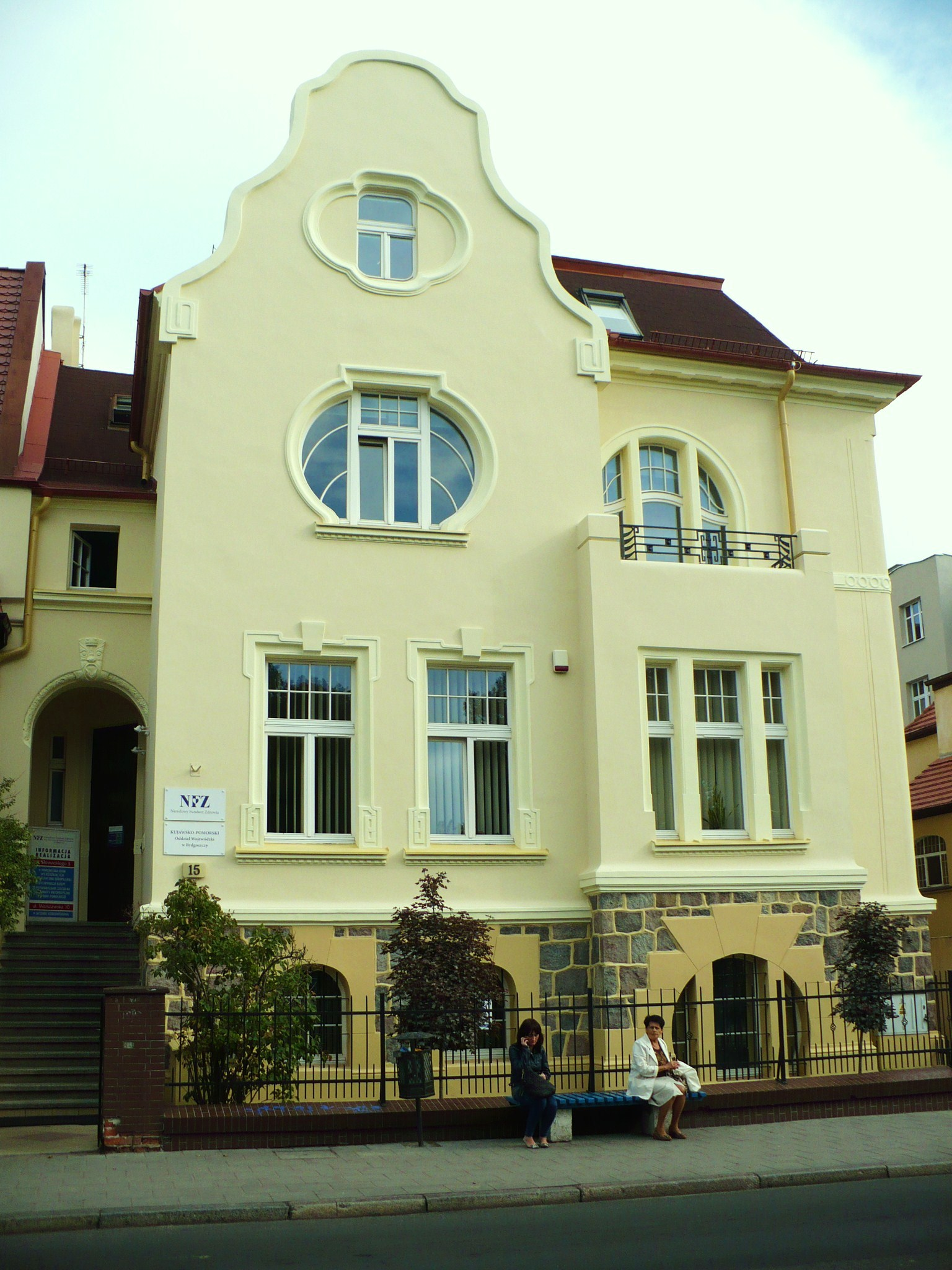
Facade of Villa at Nr.15

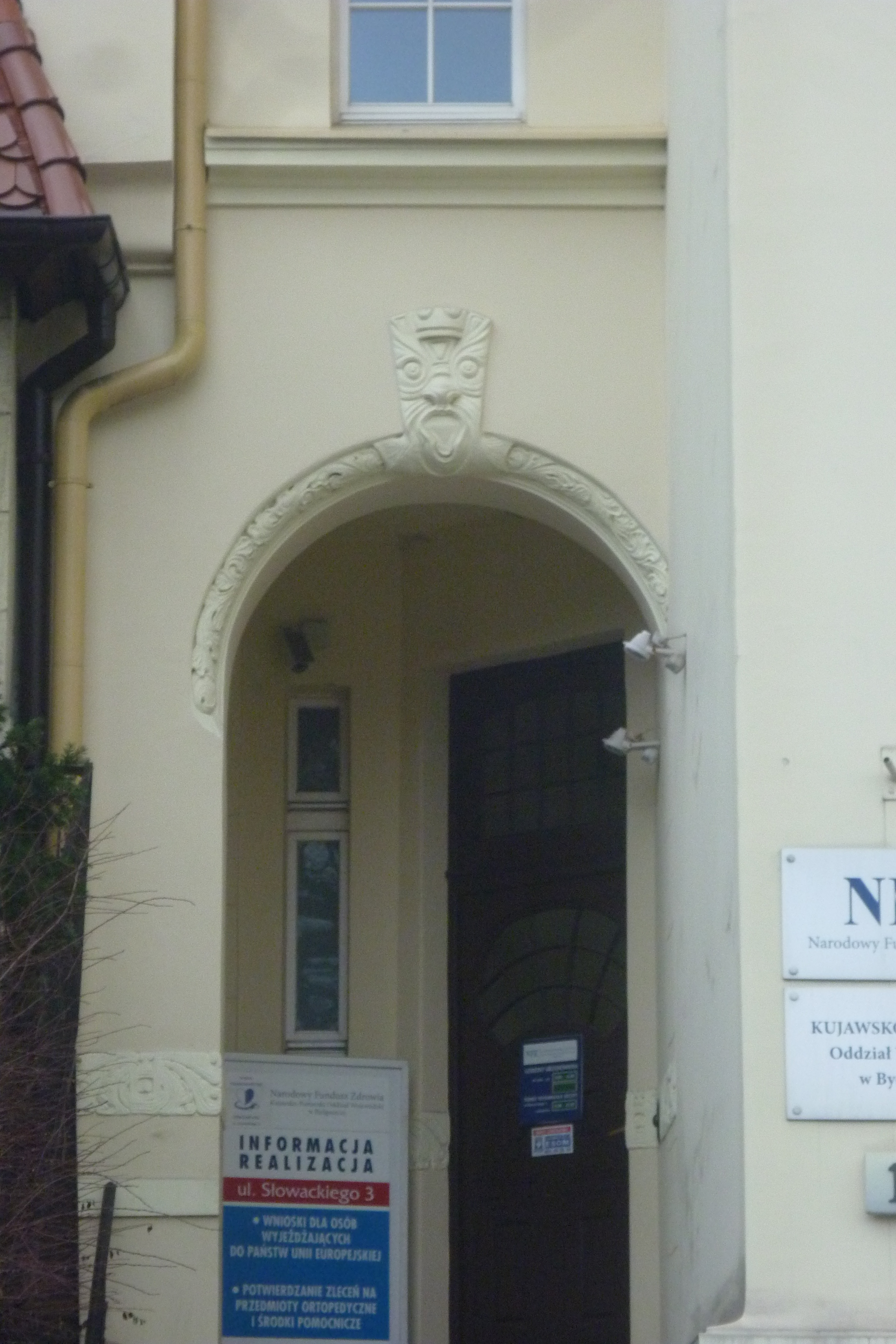
Detail of the gate of villa at Nr.15

=== Villa Józef Święcicki at 17 ===
1906

German Historicism

This villa was one of the buildings Bydgoszcz's architect Józef Święcicki realized for himself (see also Józef Święcicki tenement in Bydgoszcz).

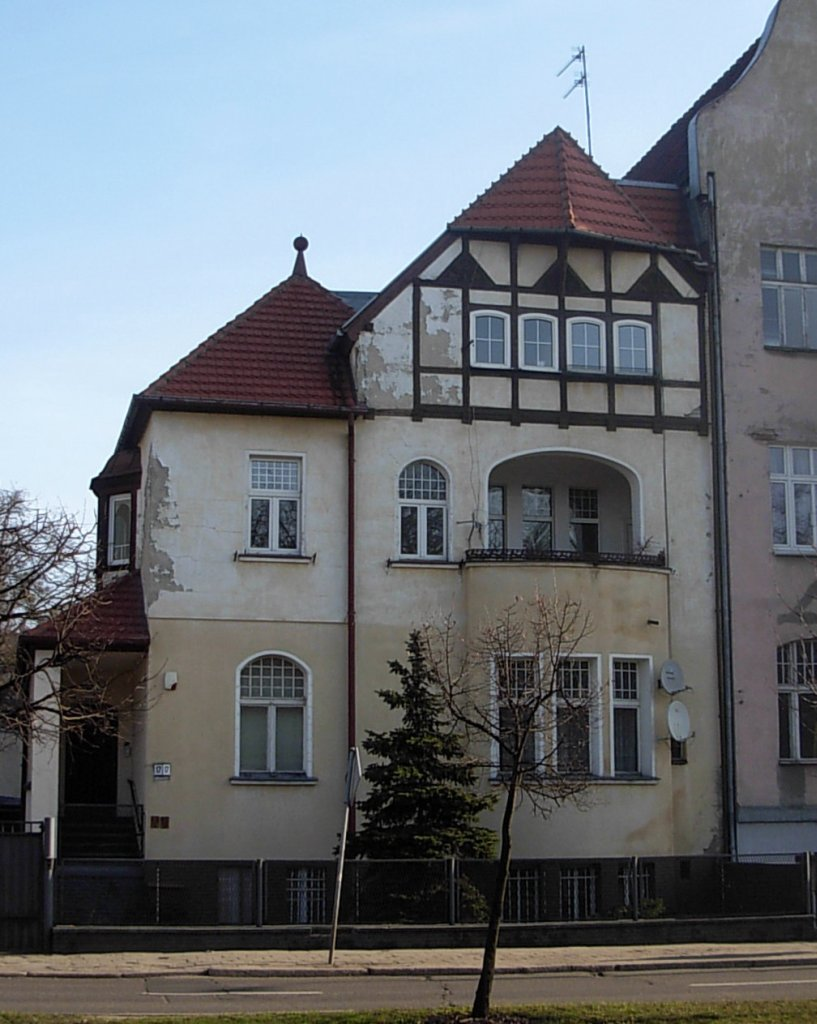
General view of the villa

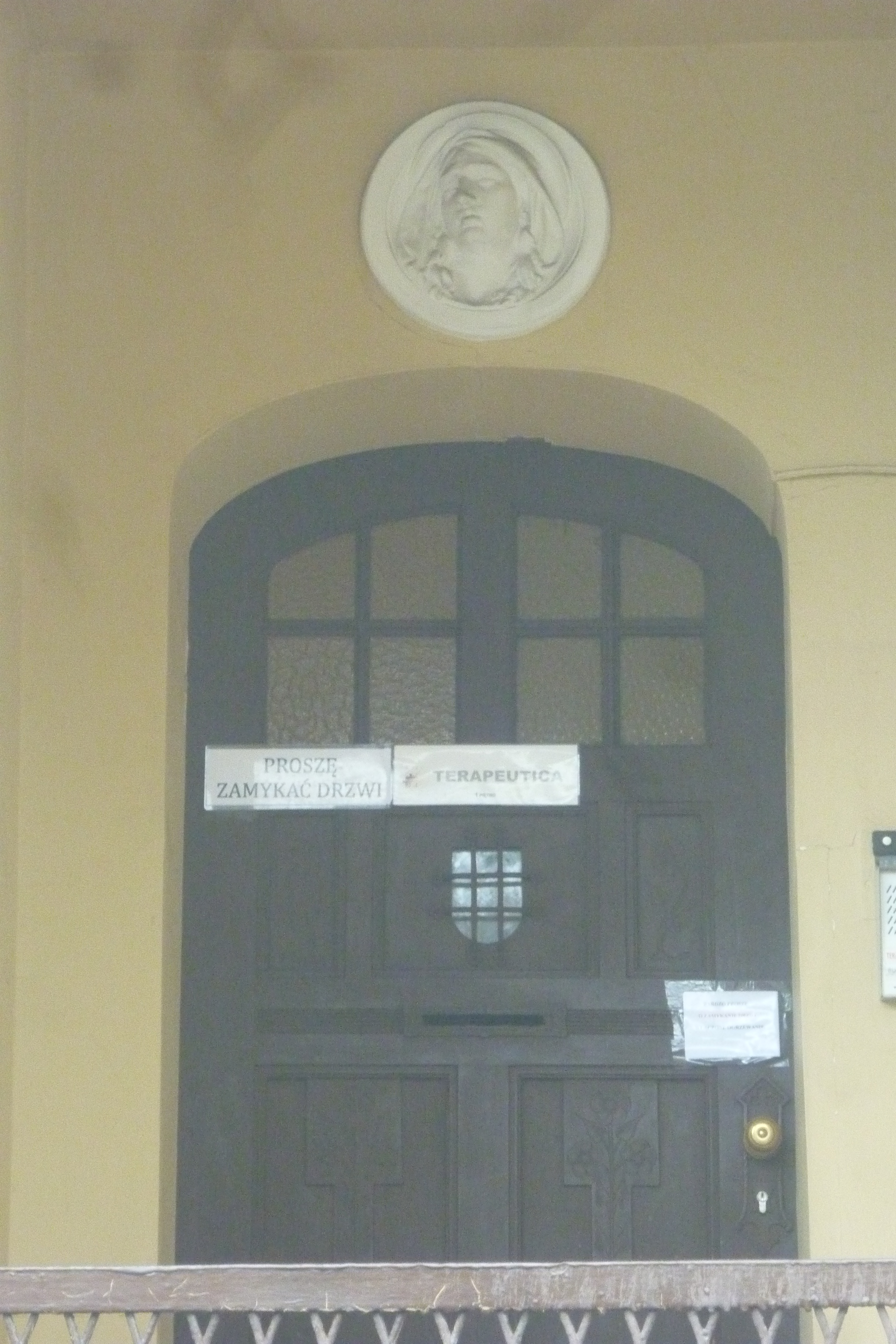
Detail of the gate of Villa Józef Święcicki

=== Sculpture The awaking of the elves (Polish: Przebudzenie Elfów) ===
1906

The carve has been realized in the trunk of a dead tree in 2006, by Zbyszko Piwoński. The artist has realized other similar sculptures at Gdańska Street 30 - (Woman with pigeons, 2006 Polish: Kobieta w gołębiach) and in Słowackiego Street - (We'll be playing soon, 2010 - Polish: Zaraz zagramy).

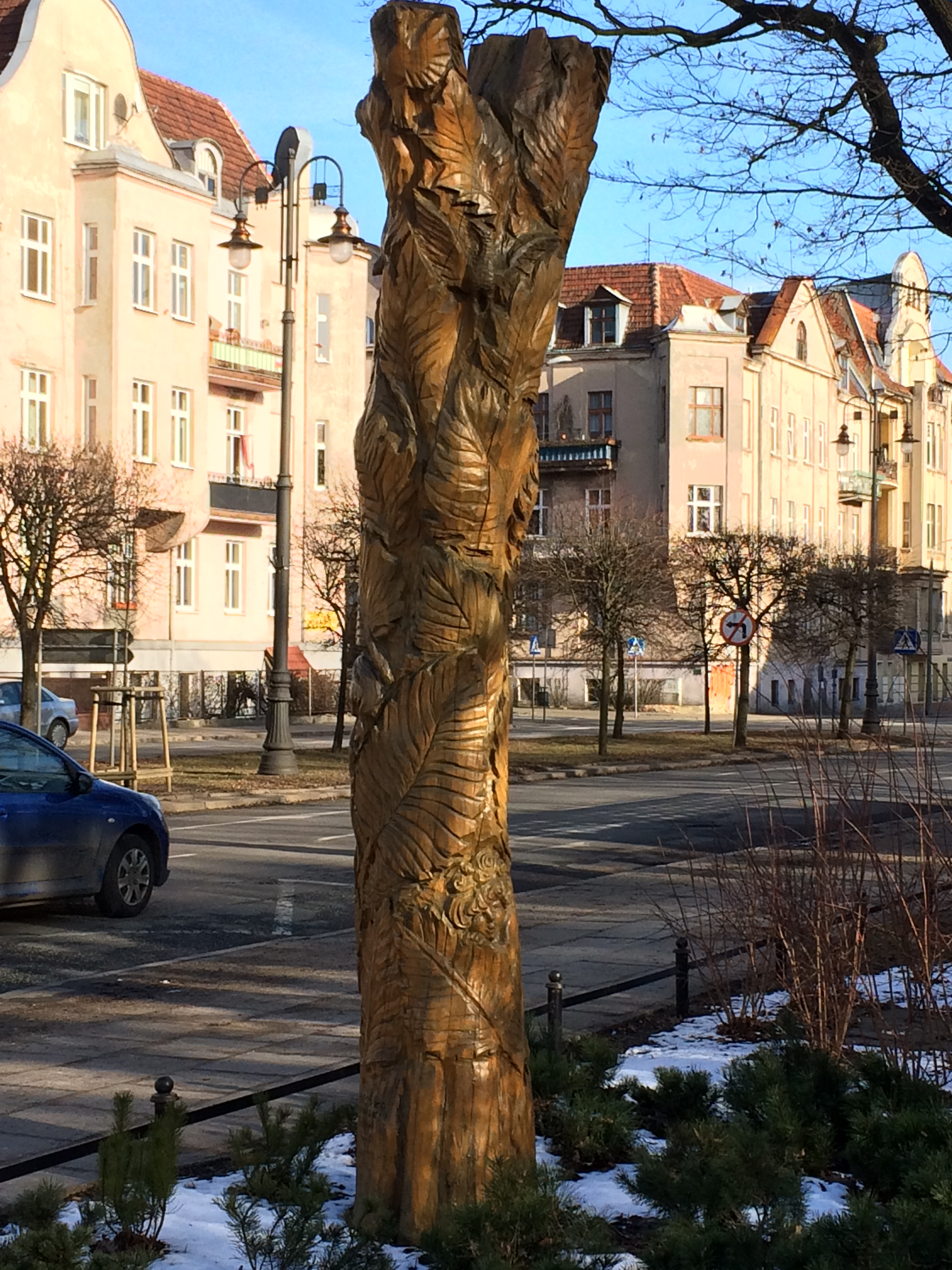
The awaking of the elves

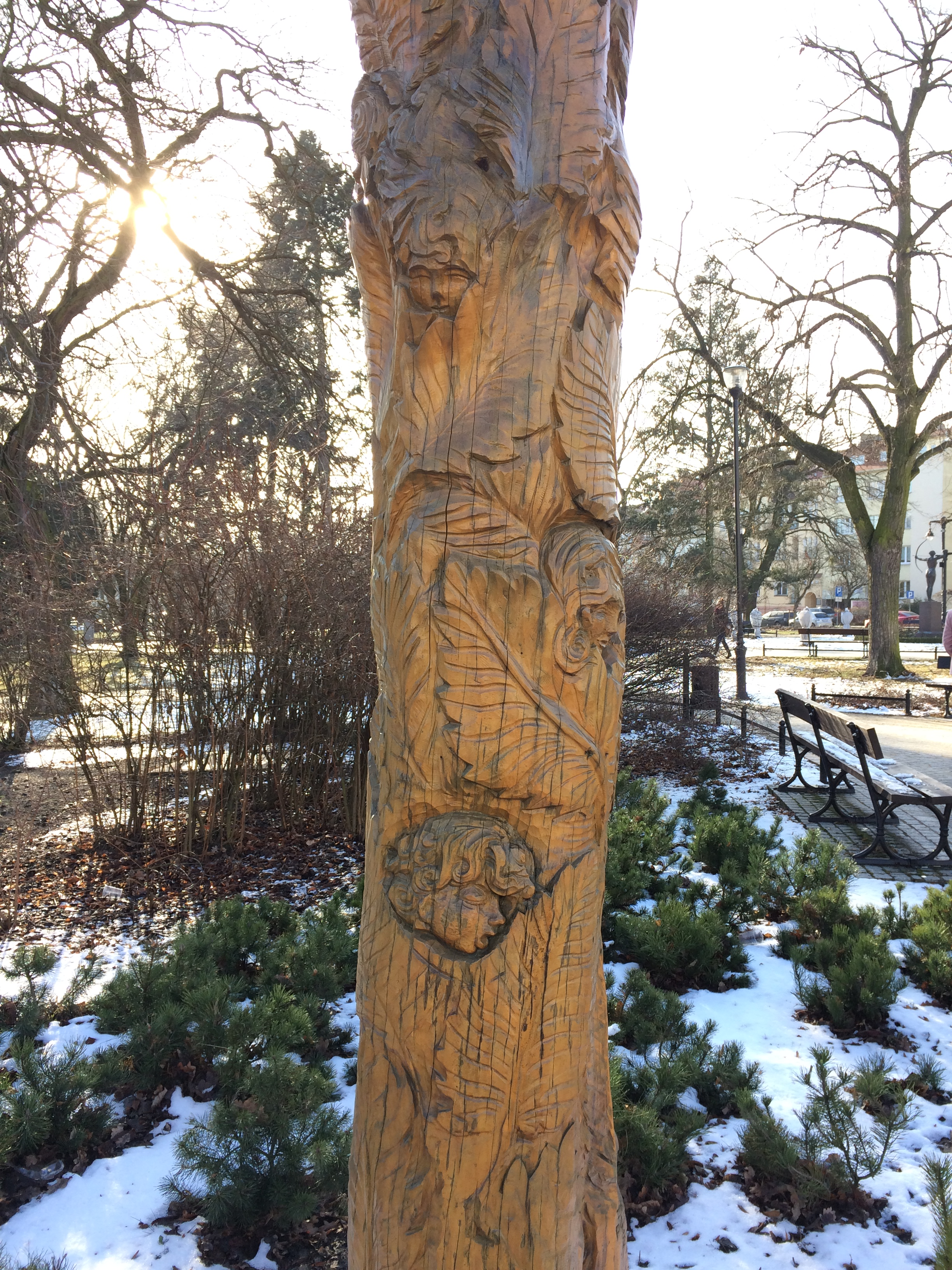
The awaking of the elves
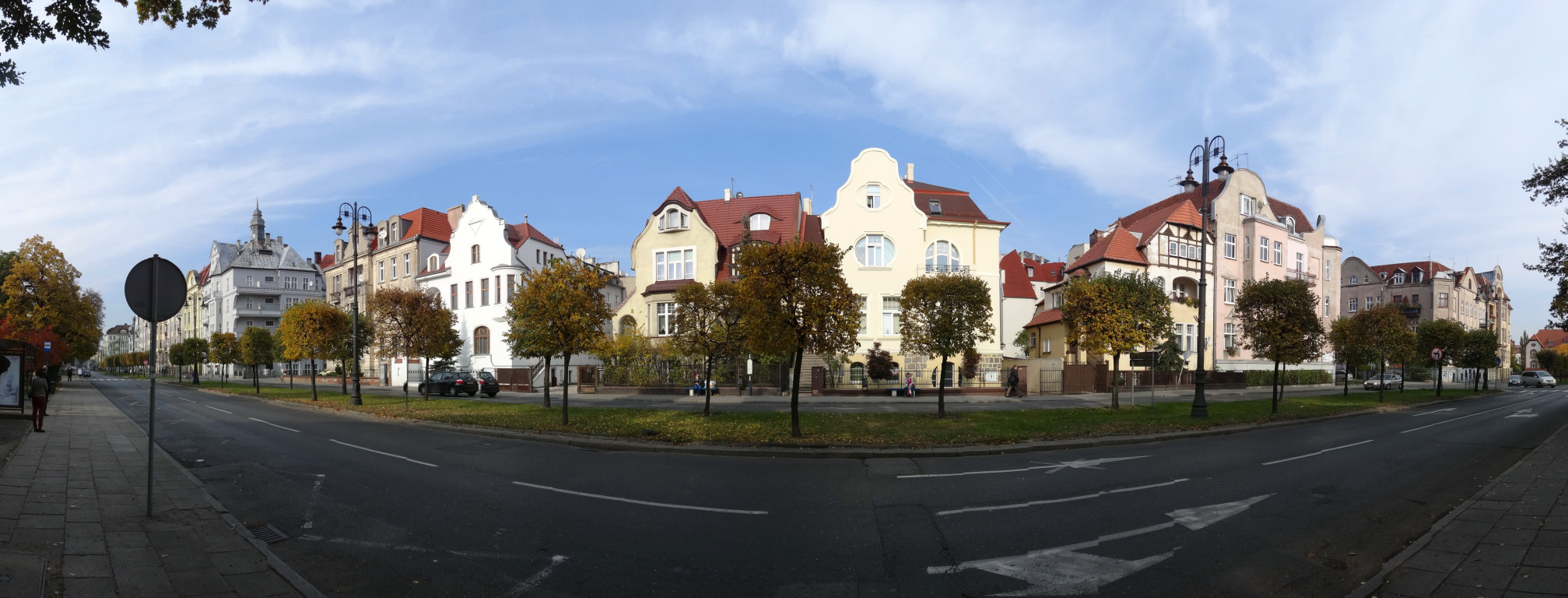
Panorama with villas at Nr.11 (left), 13/15 (center), Villa Józef Święcicki (right)

=== Corner house at 1 Paderewskiego street ===
1905-1908

Art Nouveau

This corner house displays typical tin roof above each of its bay windows.

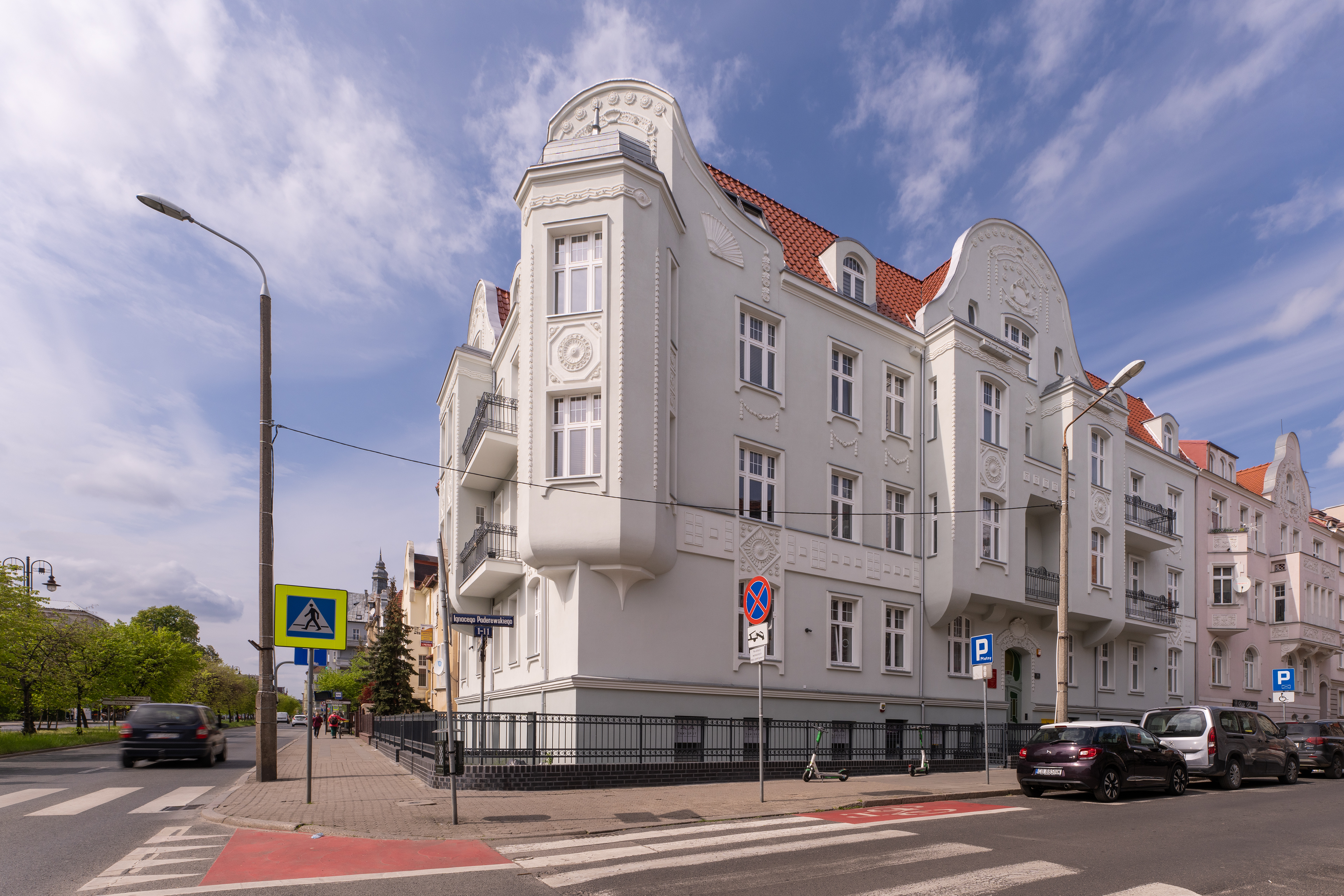
General view of both frontages

=== Corner house at 10 Paderewskiego street ===
1905-1907

Art Nouveau

This corner house starts the series of frontages characteristic of Józef Weyssenhoff Square.

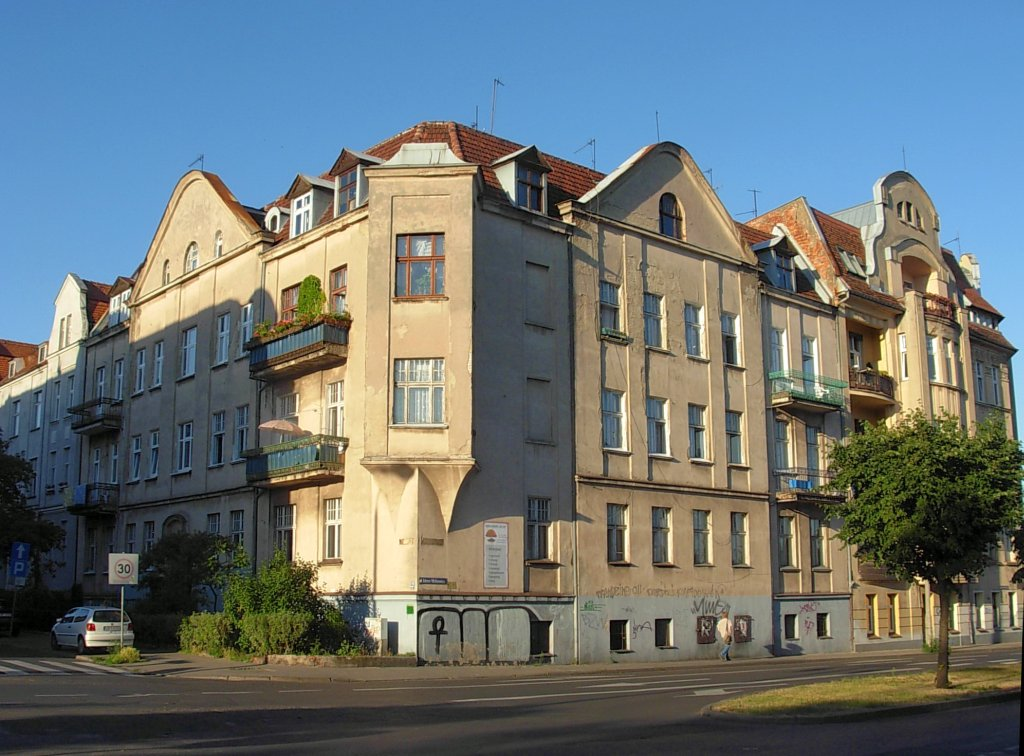
General view of both frontages

== See also ==
- Bydgoszcz
- Polish Theatre in Bydgoszcz
- Pomeranian Philharmonic
- Kopp family, Bydgoszcz
- Gdańska Street, Bydgoszcz
- Ossoliński Alley in Bydgoszcz

== Bibliography ==
- (in Polish) Majchrzak, Agnieszka (1996). Bydgoskie Konserwatorium Muzyczne. Materiały do dziejów kultury i sztuki Bydgoszczy i regionu. Zeszyt 1. Bydgoszcz: Pracownia Dokumentacji i Popularyzacji Zabytków Wojewódzkiego Ośrodka Kultury w Bydgoszczy. pp. 41–43.
- (in Polish) Bręczewska-Kulesza, Daria. Przegląd stylów występujących w bydgoskiej architekturze drugiej połowy XIX i początku XX stulecia. Bydgoszcz.
- (in Polish) Bręczewska-Kulesza Daria, Derkowska-Kostkowska Bogna, Wysocka A. (2003). Ulica Gdańska. Przewodnik historyczny. Bydgoszcz: Wojewódzki Ośrodek Kultury w Bydgoszczy. ISBN 9788386970100.
- (in Polish) Jastrzębska-Puzowska, Iwona (2005). Od miasteczka do metropolii. Rozwój architektoniczny i urbanistyczny Bydgoszczy w latach 1850-1920. Toruń: Wydawnictwo MADO. ISBN 9788389886385.
- (in Polish) Umiński, Janusz (1996). Bydgoszcz. Przewodnik. Bydgoszcz: Regionalny Oddział PTTK "Szlak Brdy".
- (in Polish) Czachorowski, Antoni (1997). Atlas historyczny miast polskich. Tom II Kujawy. Zeszyt 1. Bydgoszcz. Toruń: Uniwersytet Mikołaja Kopernika.
- (in Polish) Kuczma, Rajmund (1995). Zieleń w dawnej Bydgoszczy. Bydgoszcz: Instytut Wydawniczy "Świadectwo".
