= Gdańsk Street 91, Bydgoszcz =

Tenement at Gdanska street 91
- Polish: Kamienica Gdańska 91 w Bydgoszczy
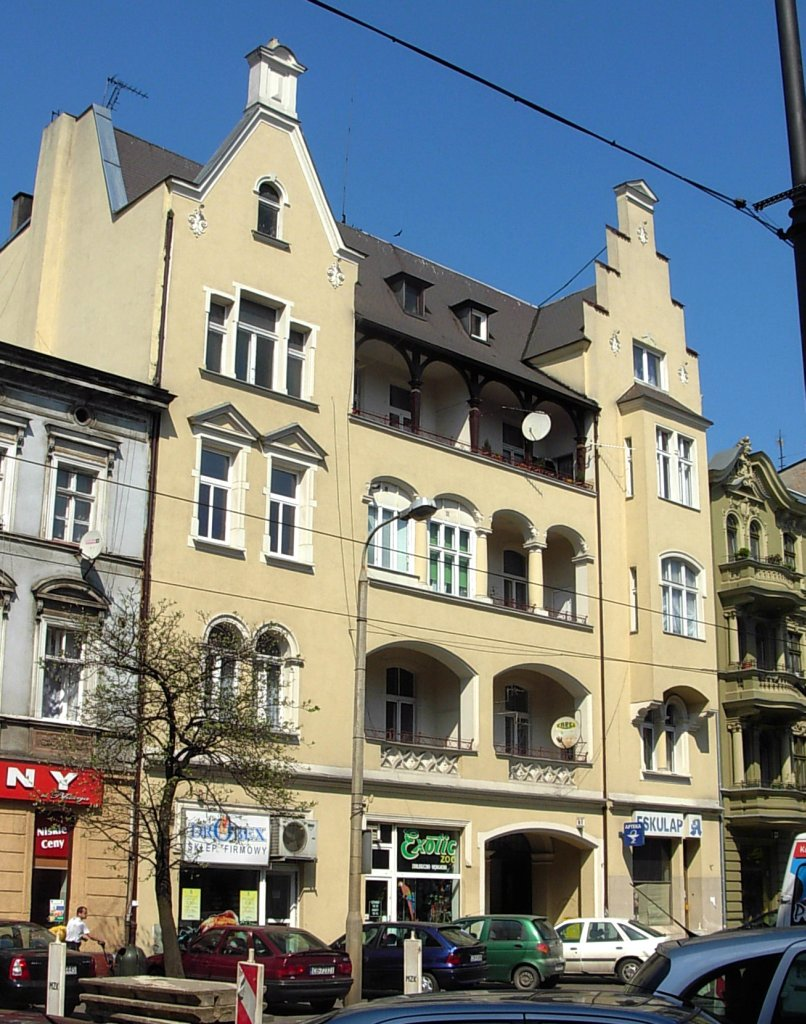
- Tenement from Gdanska Street

General information
- Type: Tenement
- Architectural style: Historicism
- Location: 91 Gdanska Street, Bydgoszcz, Poland
- Coordinates: 53°7′58″N 18°0′36″E
- Groundbreaking: 1898
- Completed: 1899
- Client: Carl Bradtke

Technical details
- Floor count: 4

Design and construction
- Architect(s): Fritz Weidner

The tenement at 91 Gdanska street is a historical habitation building located on Gdańska Street, in Bydgoszcz, Poland.

== Location ==
The building stands on the western side of Gdańska Street, between Świętojańska Street and Chocimska street.

It stands close to remarkable tenements in the same street:

- Alfred Schleusener Tenement at 62;
- Józef Święcicki tenement at 63;
- Eduard Schulz Tenement at 66/68;
- Rudolf Kern Tenement at 70;
- Tenement at 71 Gdanska street;
- Tenement at 75 Gdanska street;
- Ernst Bartsch tenement at 79;
- Paul Storz Tenement at 81;
- Otto Riedl Tenement at 85.

== History ==
The house was completed built in 1898 by the architect Fritz Weidner, a German builder who came to Bydgoszcz at the end of the 19th century, and had a frantic building activity in the city between 1896 and 1914. The architect lived in the tenement he built at 34 Gdańska in 1912.

In the same area, Fritz Weidner built houses at the following addresses:

- Mix Ernst tenement and movie theatre at 10 Gdańska Street in 1905;
- Thomas Frankowski Tenement at 28 Gdańska Street in 1897;
- George Sikorski Tenement at 31 Gdańska Street, in 1906;
- Max Rosental Tenement at 42 Gdańska Street in 1905;
- Ernst Bartsch tenement at 79 Gdańska Street, in 1898;
- House at 3 Freedom Square, in 1903.

The tenement at then 52 Danzigerstraße, was first owned by a master stonecutter, Carl Bradtke who lived until 1898 in Dworcowa street (German: Bahnofstrasse) before moving to his new house in 1899. He still kept his shop of"Marble commodities at 52 Bahnofstrasse until the start of World War I.

Carl Bradtke also commissioned another local architect, Józef Święcicki, for the construction of a nearby tenement at 93.

== Architecture ==
The house presents forms of prussian Historicism, at a transition time from the Eclecticism to Secession movement. The facade has gables with different forms, bay windows, loggias and various shaped windows.

The main frontage is flanked with triangular topped gables. The middle section play on symmetry, through the network of arcades and open loggias, while the upper part is purposefully designed asymmetrically.

This design is a choice undertaken by Fritz Weidner: to part from stuccoes for decorative arrangement as architectural elements.

Interiors have noteworthy elements, especially the ceiling in hallway and entrance adorned with flower stuccoes.

The building shows similarity with a neighbouring one, at 79, also designed by Fritz Weidner.

== Gallery ==
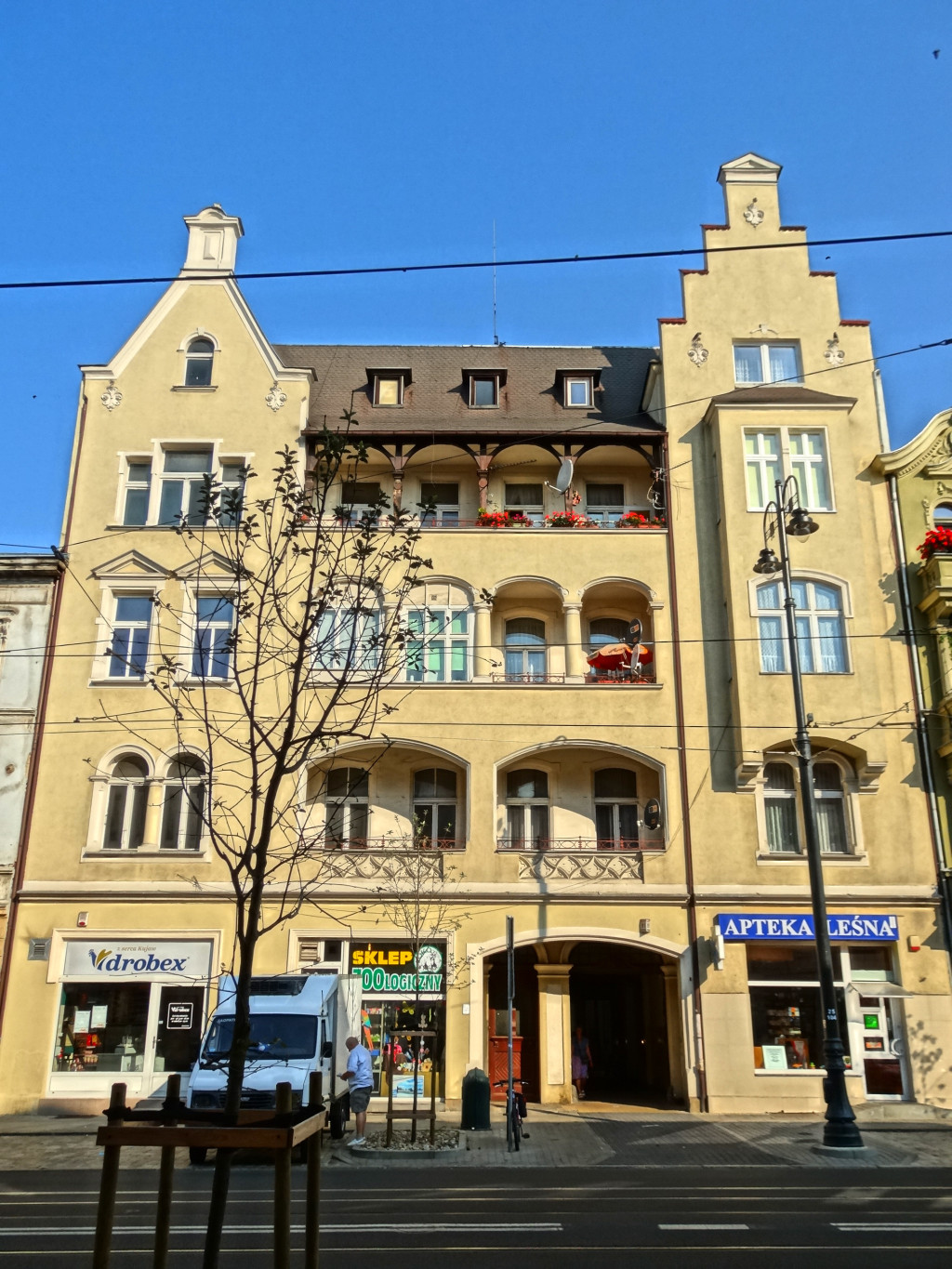
Noticeable asymmetric facade

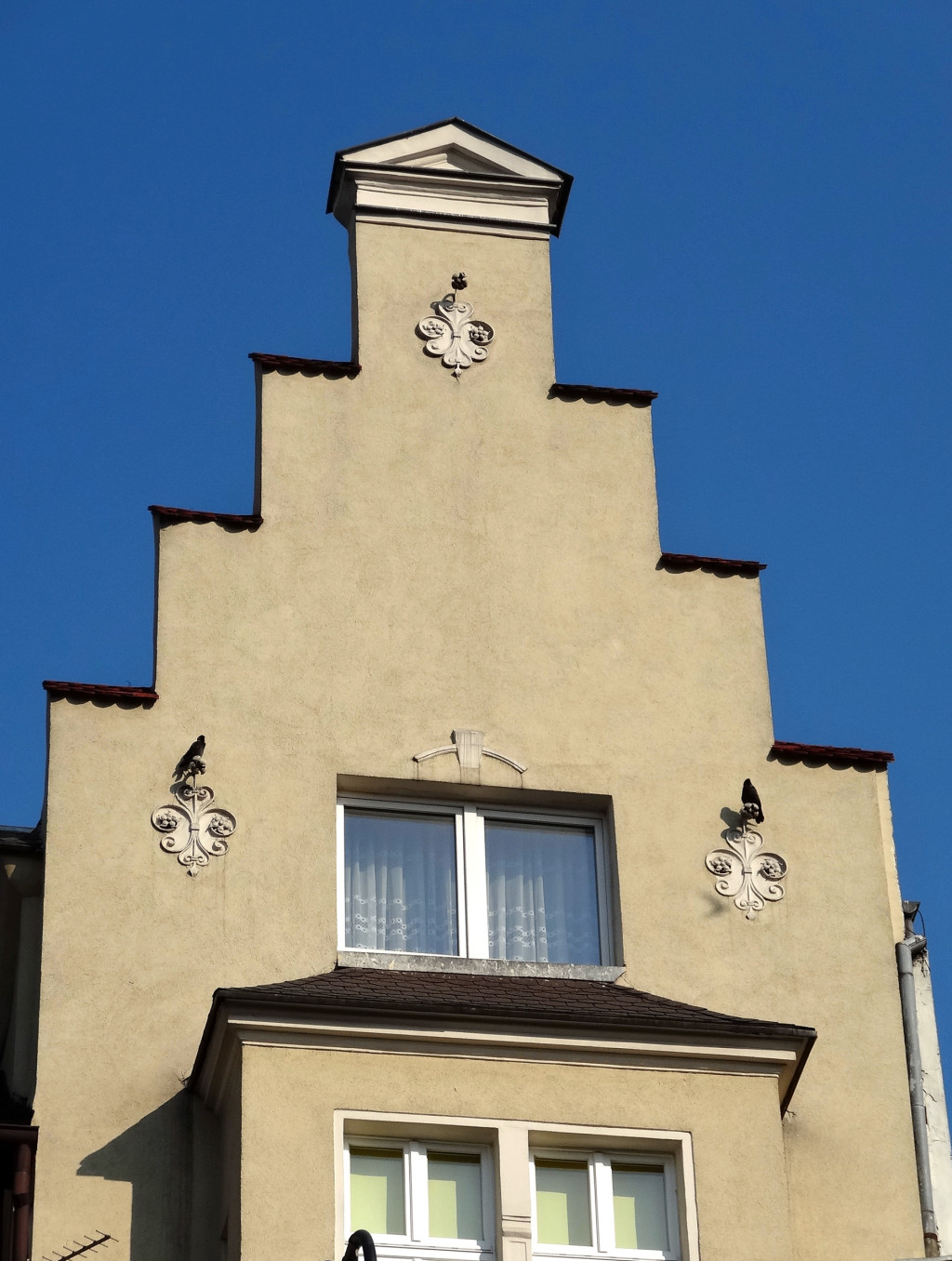
Crow-stepped gable

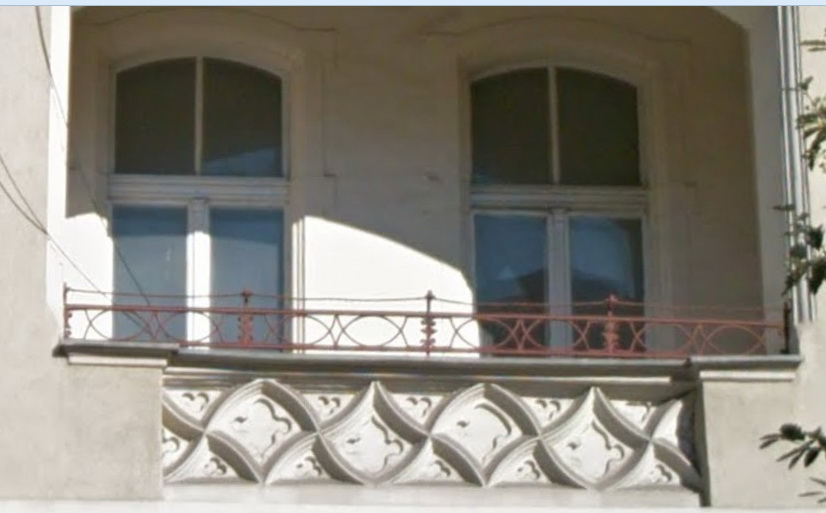
Detail of an open loggia

== See also ==
- Bydgoszcz
- Gdanska Street in Bydgoszcz
- Fritz Weidner
- (in Polish) Downtown district in Bydgoszcz

== Bibliography ==
- (in Polish) Jastrzębska-Puzowska, Iwona (2000). Poglądy artystyczne i twórczość bydgoskiego architekta Fritza Weidnera. Materiały do dziejów kultury i sztuki Bydgoszczy i regionu, z. 5. Bydgoszcz: Pracownia Dokumentacji i Popularyzacji Zabytków Wojewódzkiego Ośrodka Kultury w Bydgoszczy. pp. 37–47.
- (in Polish) Bręczewska-Kulesza Daria, Derkowska-Kostkowska Bogna, Wysocka A. (2003). Ulica Gdańska. Przewodnik historyczny. Bydgoszcz: Wojewódzki Ośrodek Kultury w Bydgoszczy. ISBN 8386970103.
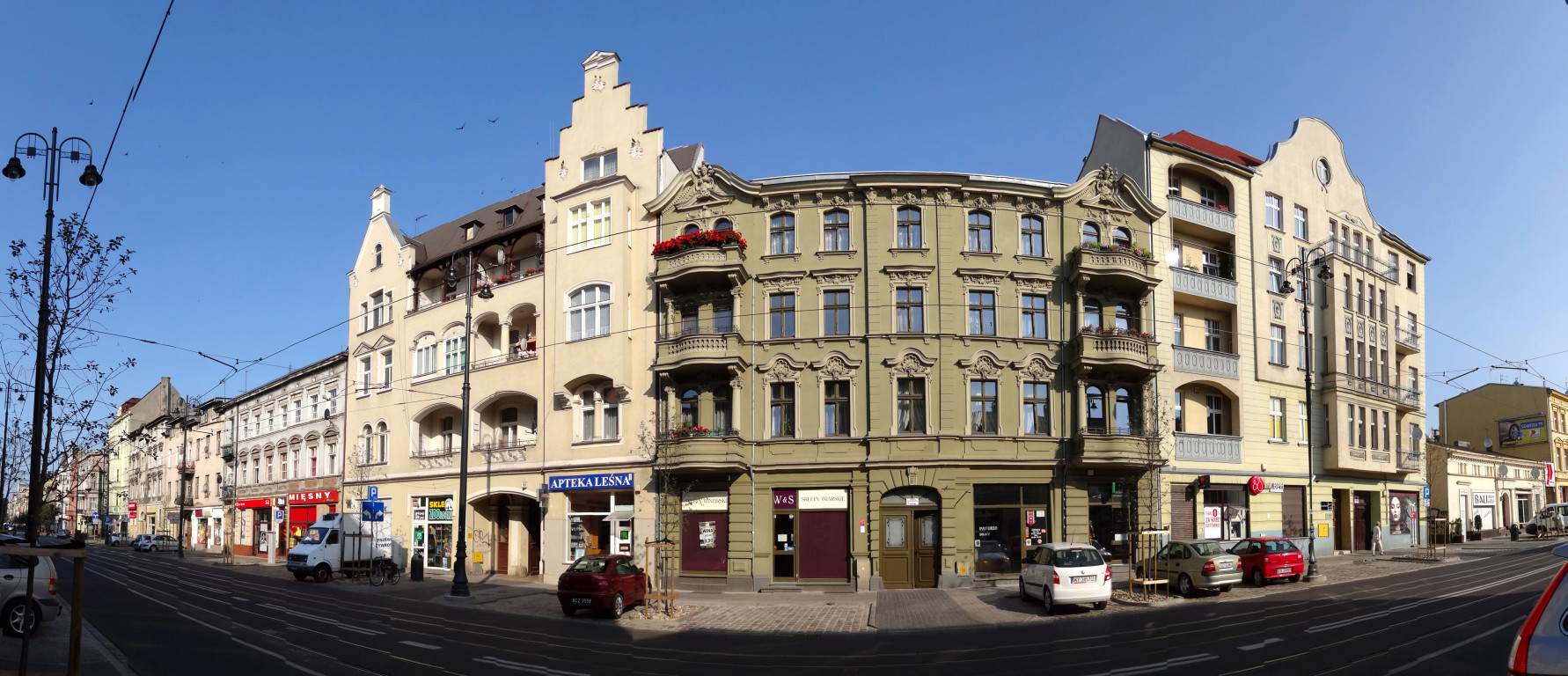
Panorama on facades of Gdanska street. Tenement at Nr.91 is on the left
