= Rudolf Kern Building =

Coordinates: 53°7′55″N 18°0′36″E

Rudolf Kern Tenement
- Polish: Kamienica Rudolfa Kerna w Bydgoszczy
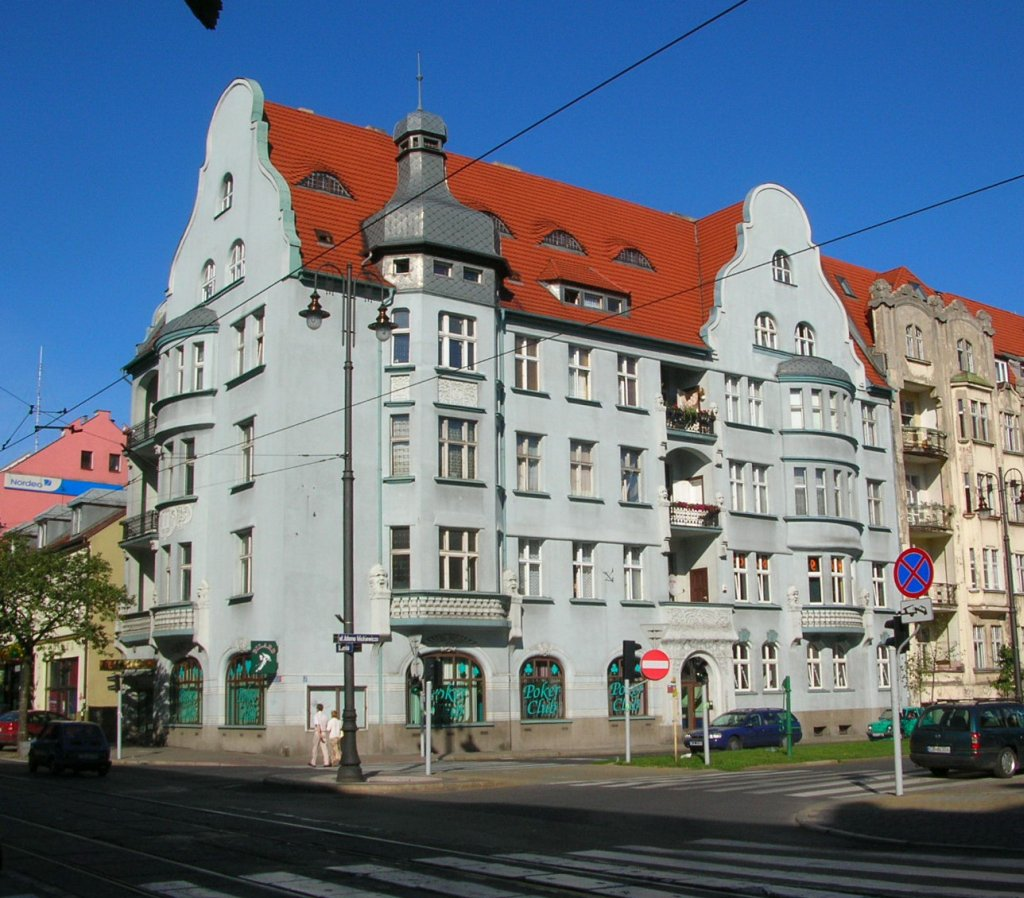
- Tenement from Gdańska Street
- Interactive map of the Rudolf Kern Tenement area

General information
- Type: Tenement
- Architectural style: Art Nouveau
- Classification: Nr.601377-Reg.A/1086, 20 November 1995
- Location: 1 Mickiewicz Alley, at the intersection with Gdańska Street, Bydgoszcz, Poland
- Groundbreaking: 1903
- Completed: 1904
- Client: Rudolf Kern

Technical details
- Floor count: 5

Design and construction
- Architect: Rudolf Kern

Rudolf Kern Tenement is a habitation building located at 1 Mickiewicz Alley, in Bydgoszcz, Poland. It has been inscribed on the Kuyavian-Pomeranian Voivodeship Heritage List.

== Location ==
The building stands on the eastern side of Gdańska Street at the intersection with Mickiewicz Alley.

It stands close to tenements in the same street:

- Alfred Schleusener Tenement at 62;
- Józef Święcicki tenement at 63;
- Eduard Schulz Tenement at 66/68;
- Tenement at 71 Gdańska street;
- Tenement at 75 Gdańska street;
- Ernst Bartsch tenement at 79;
- Paul Storz Tenement at 81.

== History ==
On the plot, before the current building, there was a tavern (German: wirtschaft), managed by Emil Manthei

This made the area prone to leisure, emphasized by the presence, since the end of the 19th century, of a theatre and a restaurant on the other side of the intersection (at 66-68 Gdańska street).

The house was built in 1903–1904, designed by the architect Rudolf Kern, a student of Józef Święcicki who also erected or redesigned other buildings in Gdańska Street:

- August Mentzel Tenement at 5;
- Eduard Schulz Tenement at 66/68;
- Tenement at 71 Gdańska street.

Rudolf Kern originally erected the tenement for his own use, private and business. He lived there until 1922.

The building will soon accommodate a four-star hotel, including a gastronomic restaurant, with recreational and commercial areas.

== Features ==
The building has a decorative Art Nouveau facade. It has four main floors and one hidden in the upper roof. In a way its size balances the symmetry with the opposite building.

It is characterized by an asymmetric arrangement of loggia and bays, typical decorative elements including leaf and tendril motifs, intertwined organic forms, mostly curvaceous in shape.

Notable elements:

- low-relief adorned portal;
- large threatening masks on the facade;
- many interior design original elements such as staircase, stained glass, woodwork.

The building has been put on the Kuyavian-Pomeranian Heritage List Nr.601377 Reg.A/1086, on 20 November 1995.

== Gallery ==
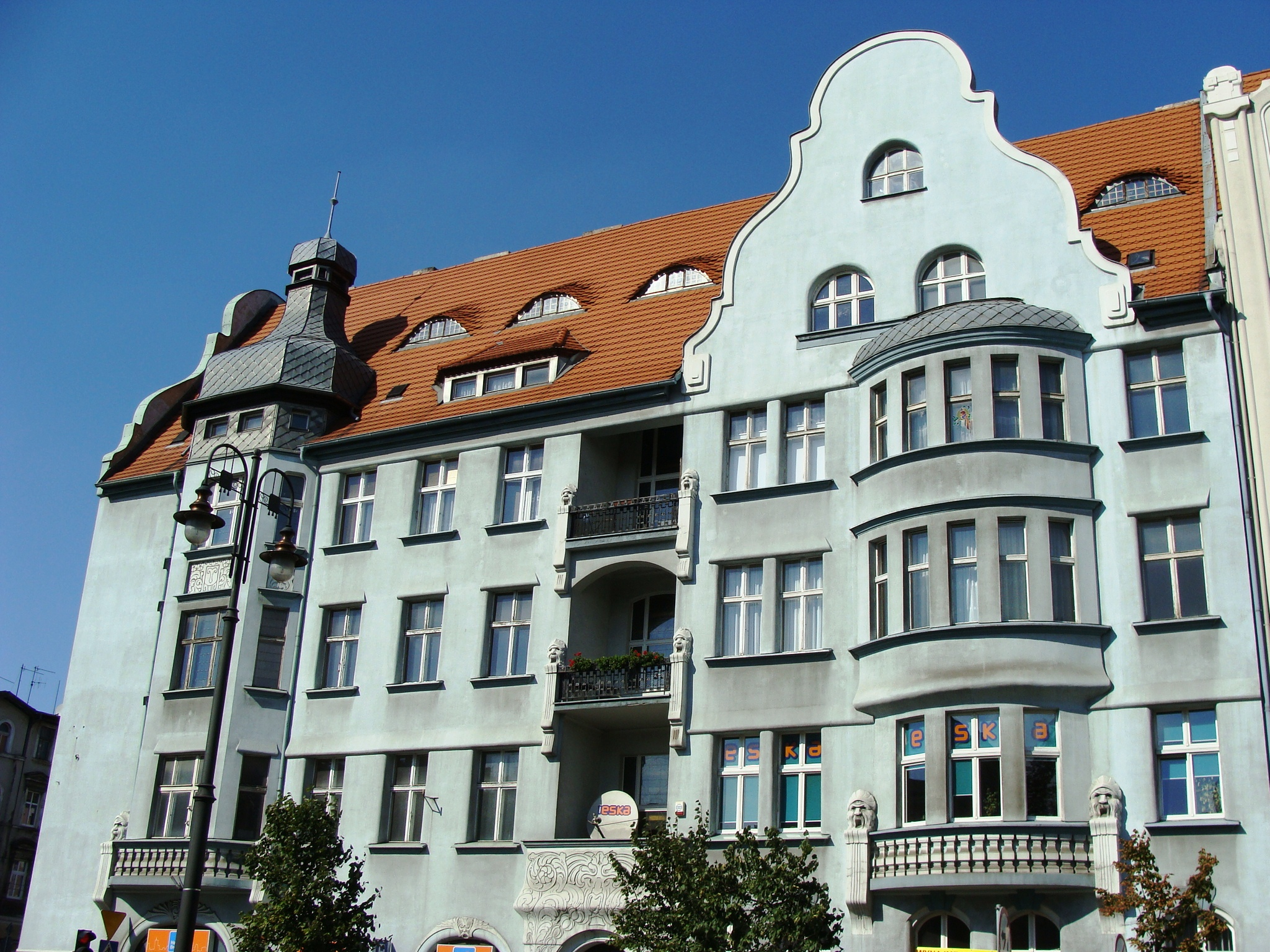
Frontage onto Mickiewicz alley

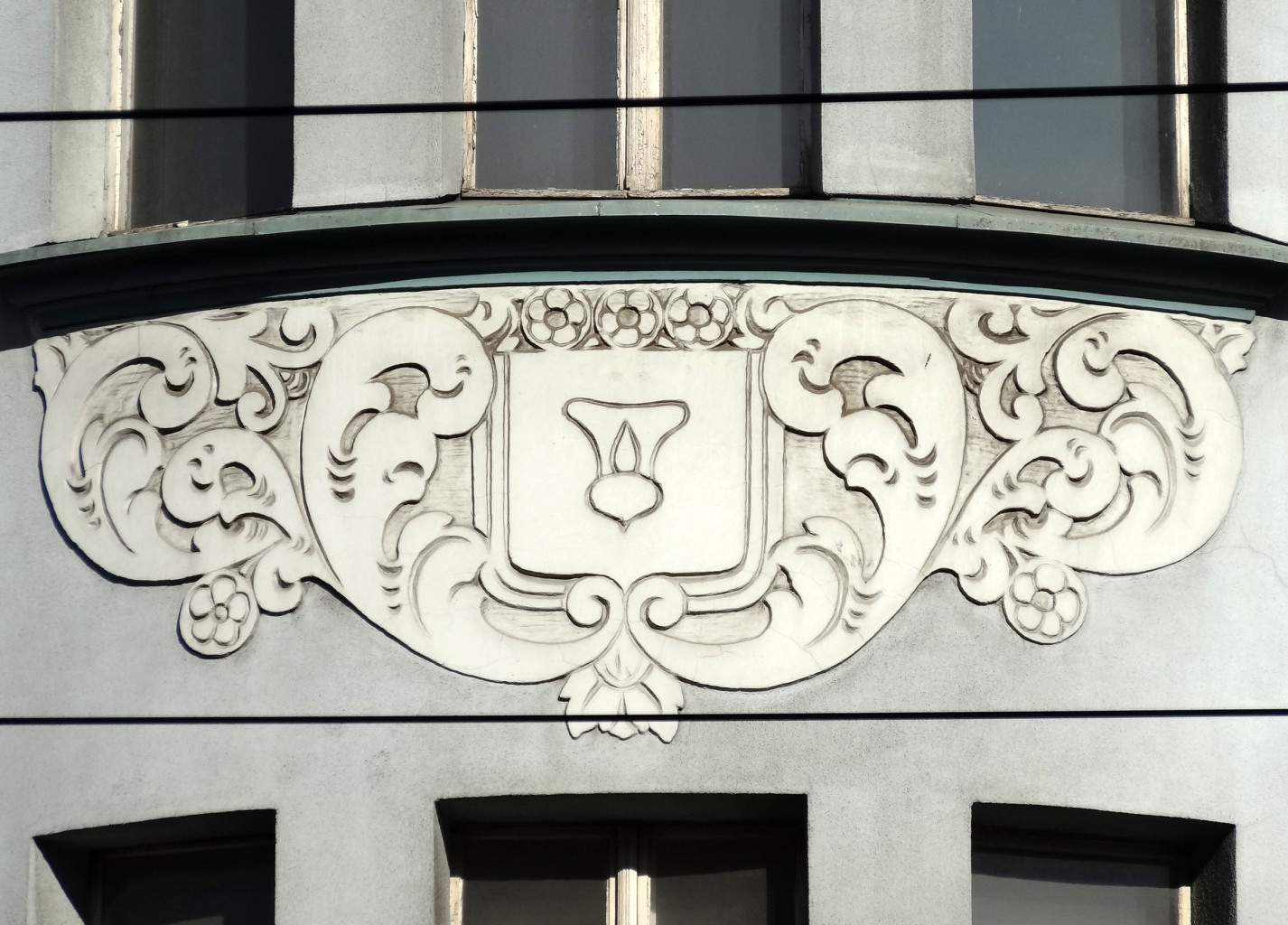
Art Nouveau detail

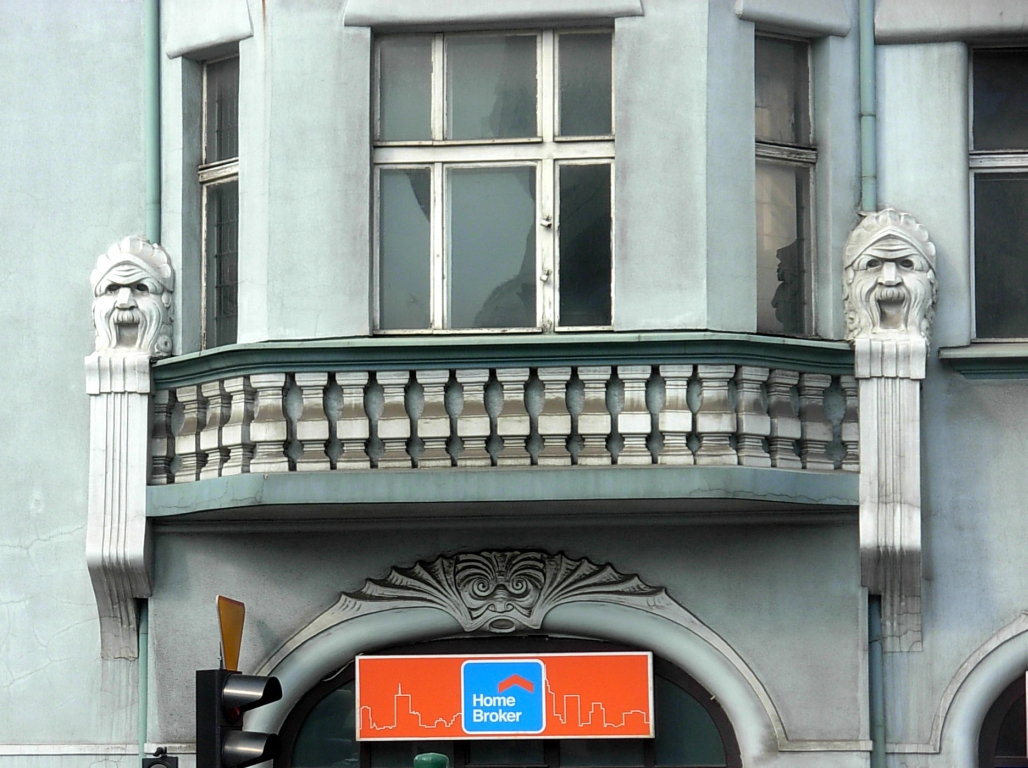
Masked faces on the facade

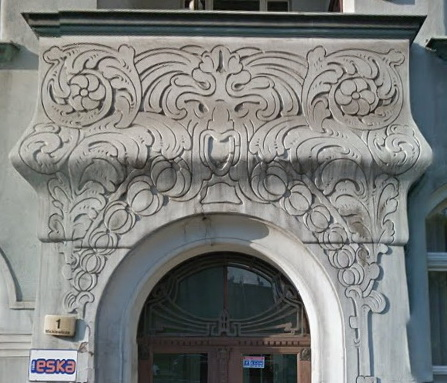
Detail of the portal

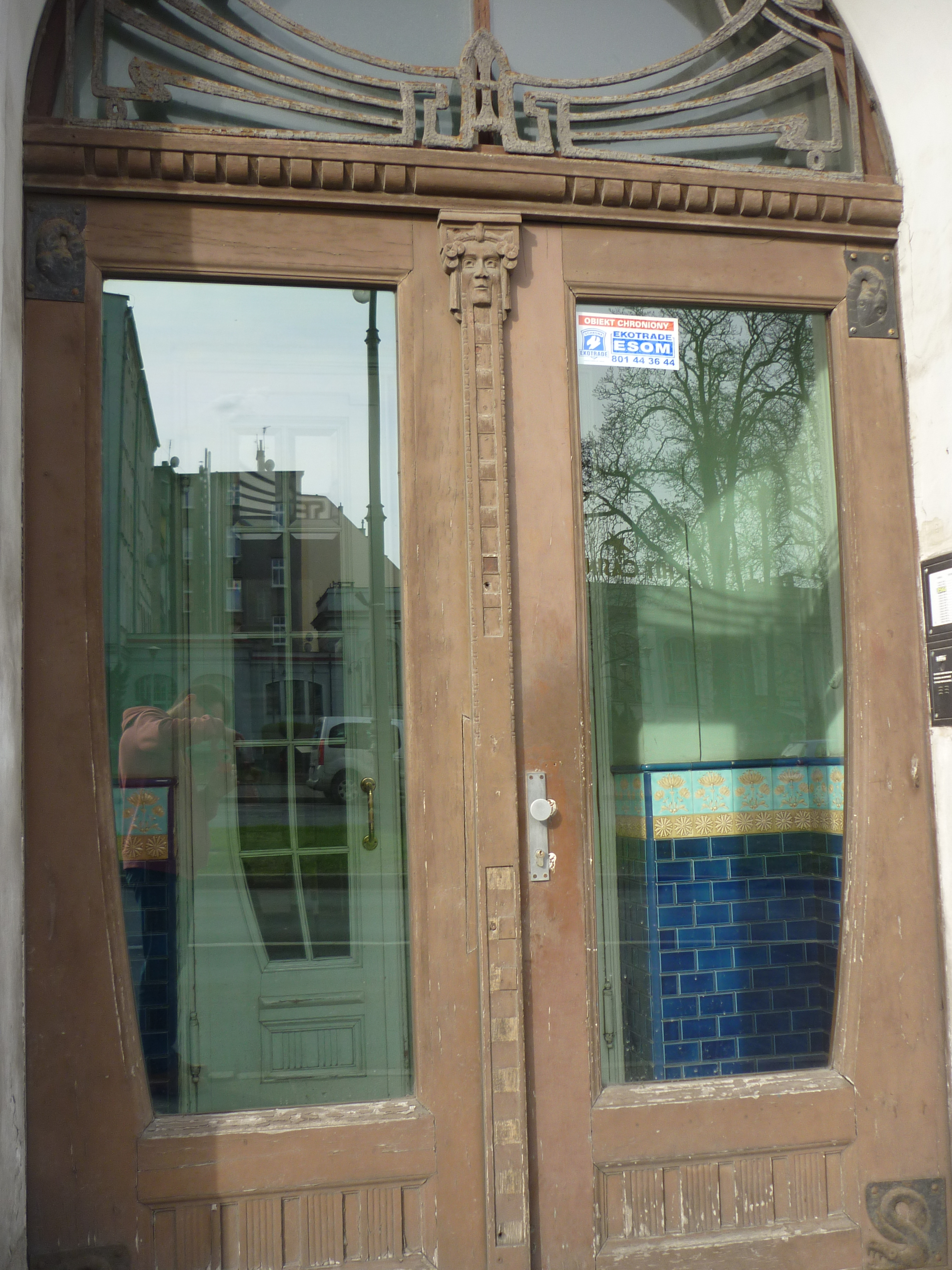
Detail of the carved door

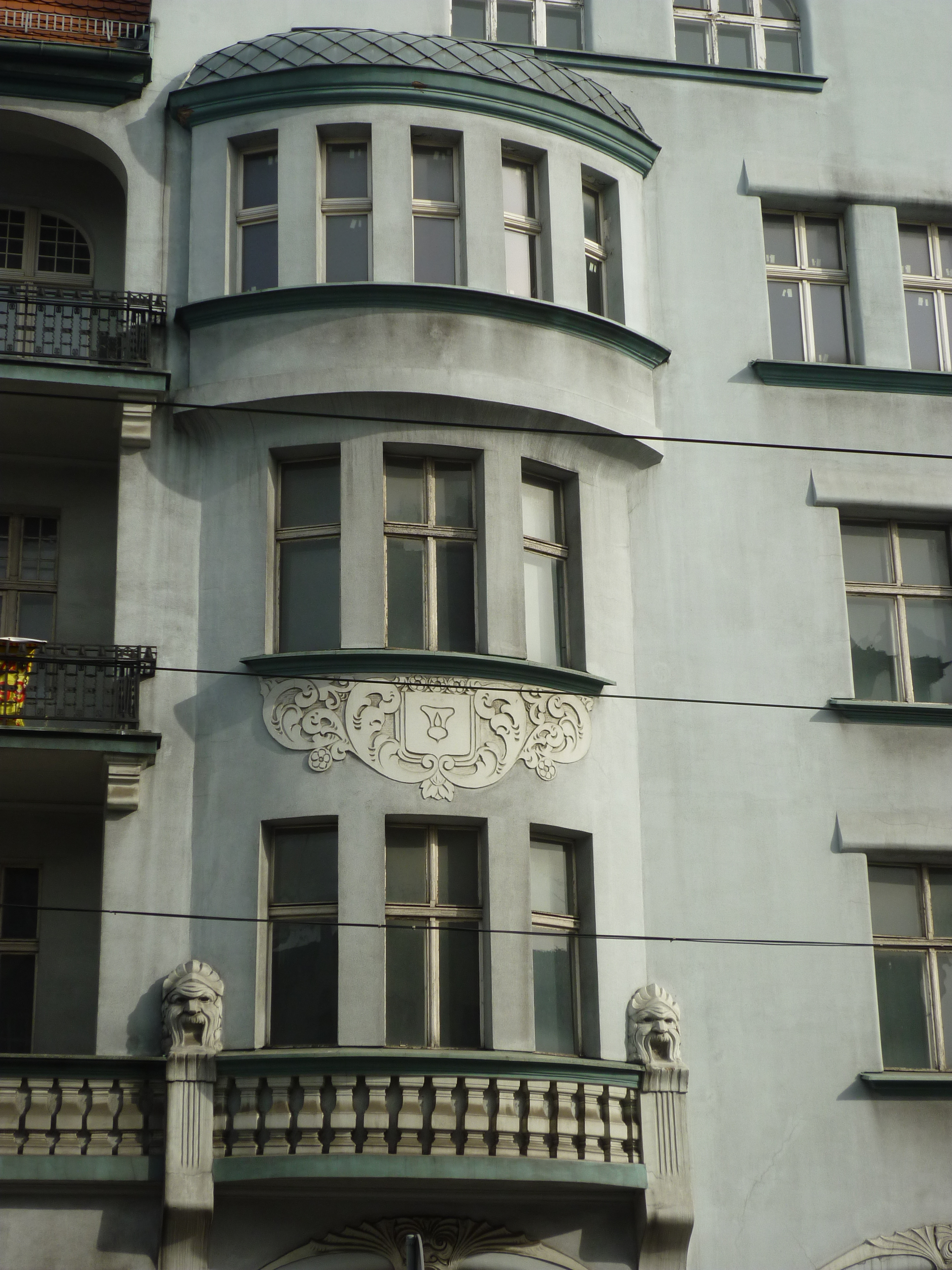
Detail of a bow window

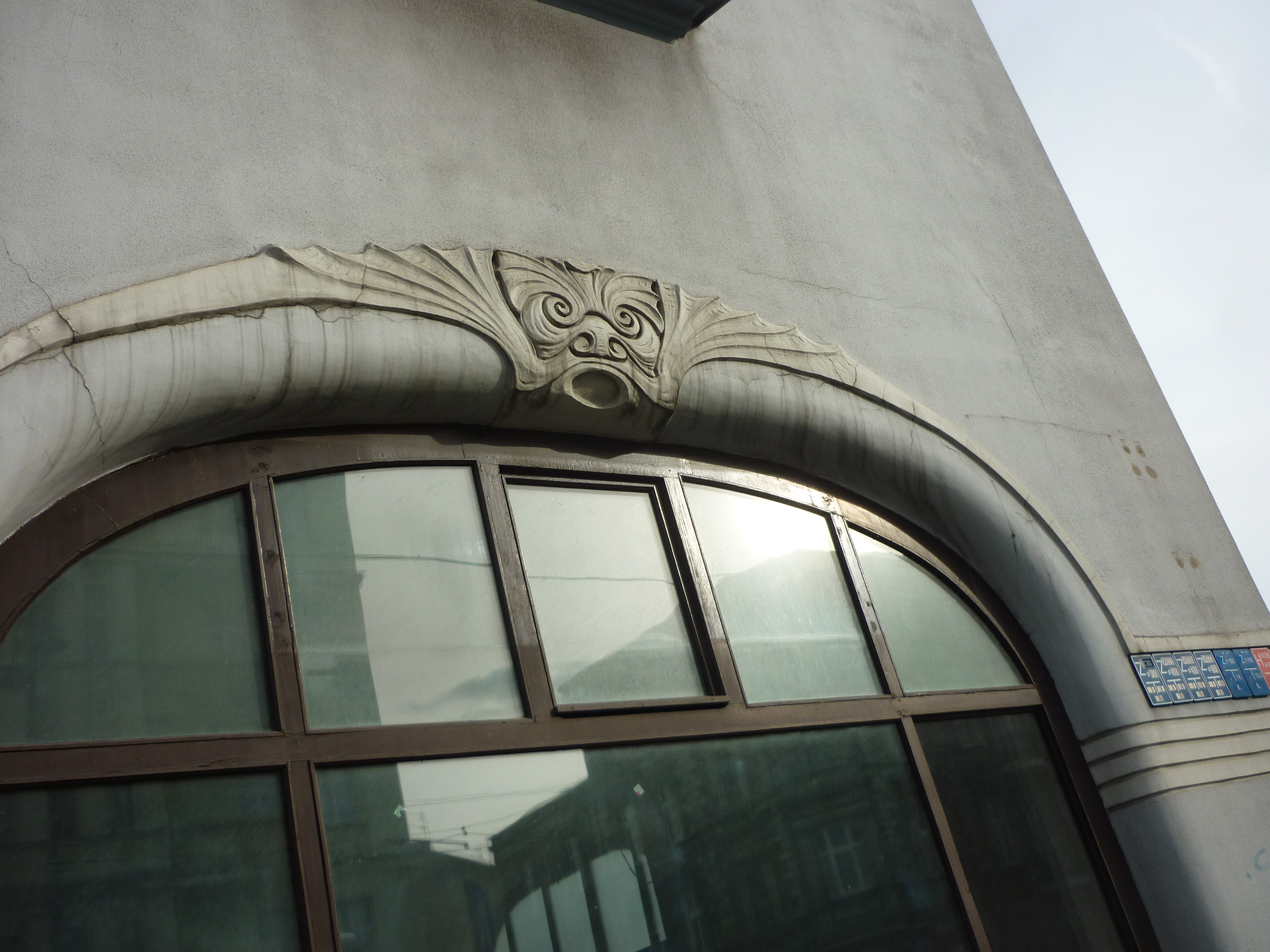
Detail of a motif

== See also ==
- Bydgoszcz
- Gdanska Street in Bydgoszcz
- Rudolf Kern
- (in Polish) Downtown district in Bydgoszcz

== Bibliography ==
- (in Polish) Bręczewska-Kulesza Daria, Derkowska-Kostkowska Bogna, Wysocka A. (2003). Ulica Gdańska. Przewodnik historyczny. Bydgoszcz: Wojewódzki Ośrodek Kultury w Bydgoszczy. ISBN 9788386970100.
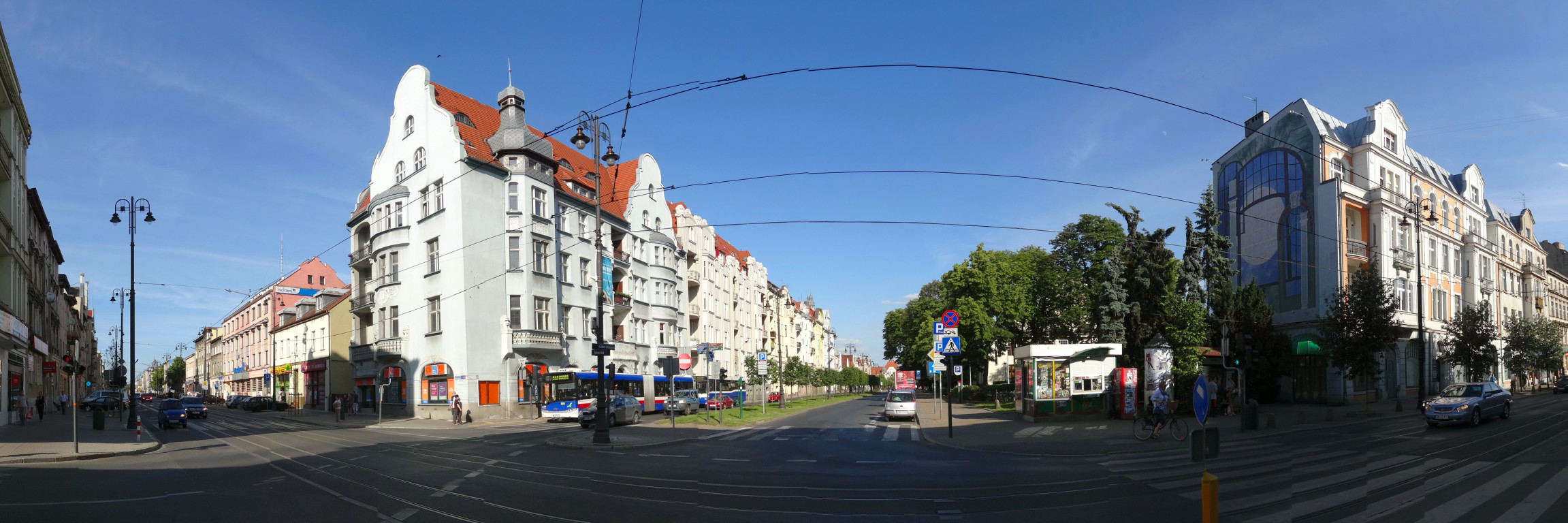
Panorama on Gdańska Street intersection with Mickiewicz alley, the building on the left
