= August Mentzel Tenement =

- Polish: Kamienica Augusta Mentzla
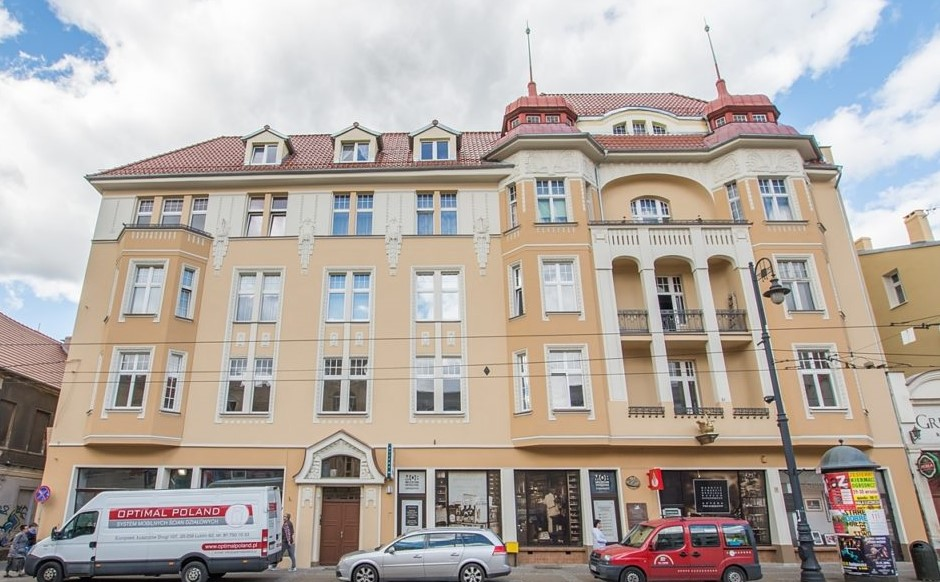
- View from Gdańska Street

- Location within Poland

General information
- Type: Tenement
- Architectural style: Vienna Secession
- Location: Bydgoszcz, Poland, 5 Gdańska Street, Bydgoszcz, Poland
- Coordinates: 53°07′29″N 18°00′09″E
- Completed: 1853
- Renovated: 1909
- Owner: August Mentzel (first owner)

Technical details
- Floor count: 5

Design and construction
- Architect: Rudolf Kern

The August Mentzel Tenement is a habitation house located in Gdańska Street, Poland.

== Location ==
The building stands on the western side of Gdańska Street, facing Drukarnia centre.

== History ==
=== Building ===
The original building, owned by pharmacist Constantin August Mentzel, was established in 1853. Later, a complex of buildings were built, designed by Heinrich Mautz. It consisted of a front wing and outbuildings. On the north side of the house, there was a garden growing onto the street.

From 1863, August Mentzel ran a homeopathic pharmacy in that building. He used herbs from the garden to produce medicines and ointments sold in his shop.

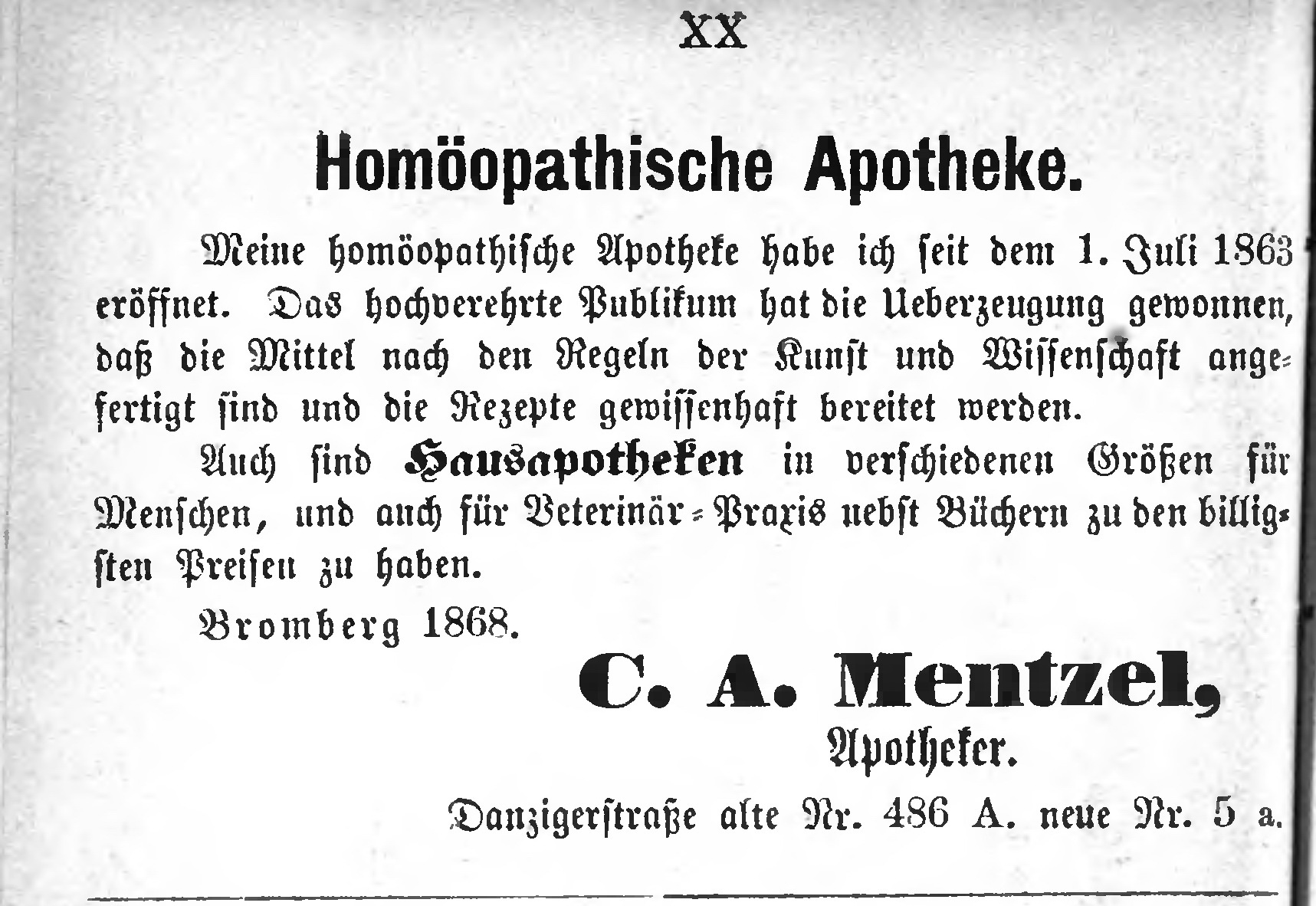
Advertisement A. Mentzel in 1868

Later in 1909, the chemist Alfred Jacob who owned the building carried out a major refurbishment, carried out by the architect Rudolf Kern. The tenement was extended by a north wing, moving the garden to the back of the property. Renovation also changed the arrangement of the facade, which gave the actual sight of exteriors.

Now, the ground floor of the building still houses one of the oldest pharmacies of Bydgoszcz, "Pod Łabędziem" (Under the Swan). In 2006, a sculptured golden swan, used as the signboard from the 19th century until the 1950s was fixed back onto the facade.

The tenement has been refurbished in 2018.

=== Pharmacy Under the Swan ===
The pharmacy Under the Swan (German: Schwanen-Apotheke,), established on December 27, 1853, was the third in the city after pharmacies "Pod Czarnym Orłem" (Under the Black Eagle) and "Pod Złotym Orłem" (Under the Golden Eagle). During this period of time in Europe, pharmacies were often named after the names and values of animals. Thus, August Mentzel named his pharmacy Pod Łabędziem ("Under the Swan"), as this bird is associated with deep symbolism and its sign is easy to remember.

Alfred Jacob bought the pharmacy from Constantin August Mentzel in 1895. He established a partnership with his son in law, Bruno Kazimierski, on June 1, 1923. Bruno became the sole owner of the building in October 1932, till the end of World War II.

After World War II the pharmacy was leased by Poland to Henryk Kowalewski till January 1951, when it was nationalized, and was renamed "Social Pharmacy Nr.39". The swan signboard was removed and taken to the Pharmacy Museum in Kraków. Around 1975, the pharmacy regained its traditional name.

=== Golden Swan ===
The gold alloy cast swan figure has been used as the pharmacy emblem probably since the opening. The figure is fixed on a beam protruding from the wall above the main entrance.

In 1959, Dr. Stanisław Proń from the Museum of Pharmacy in Kraków, having received permission from the Ministry of Health, was traveling across Poland to collect interesting pharmacy antiques to add to the museum collections. He noticed the Bydgoszcz's swan and brought it to Kraków. The golden swan was discovered in the warehouse of the Kraków Museum of Pharmacy in Jagiellonian University and was given back to the Bydgoszcz Museum of Pharmacy in July 2006. The actual swan sign is an epoxy resin copy of the antique one, realized by a local artist, Bogusław Czerwiński.

=== Pharmacy museum ===
On 27 December 2003, 150 years after the opening of the pharmacy, pharmacist and collector, Bartholomew Wodyński opened the Pharmacy Museum in Bydgoszcz, at the rear of Under the Swan building. Today it is one of the few Pharmacy Museums in Poland with its original equipment, mostly from the 19th century. In 2017, the Pharmacy Museum was closed, and the collection was bought by The Leon Wyczółkowski District Museum in Bydgoszcz. Renovation works are underway in the former pharmacy rooms at 5 Gdańska Street to adapt the facility to the public and open in 2020.

== Architecture ==
The house has a Vienna Secession decoration on the facade, which features stylized swan motifs. Art Nouveau style is typical of Rudolf Kern. He also has erected or redesigned other buildings in Gdańska Street, notably;

- His own house, at 1 Adam Mickiewicz Alley;
- Tenement at 67 Gdańska street;
- Eduard Schulz Tenement;
- House at 10 Cieszkowskiego Street.

== Gallery ==
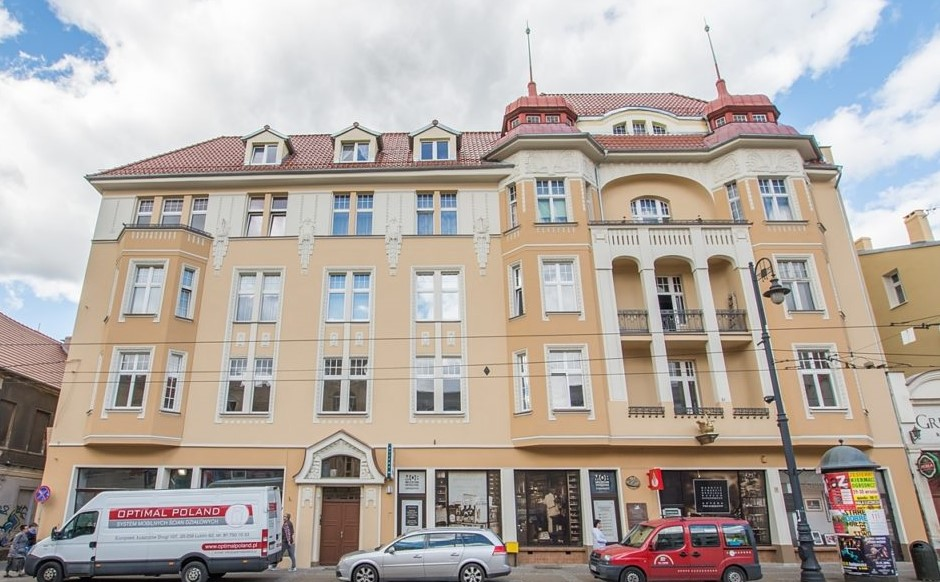
Renovated facade

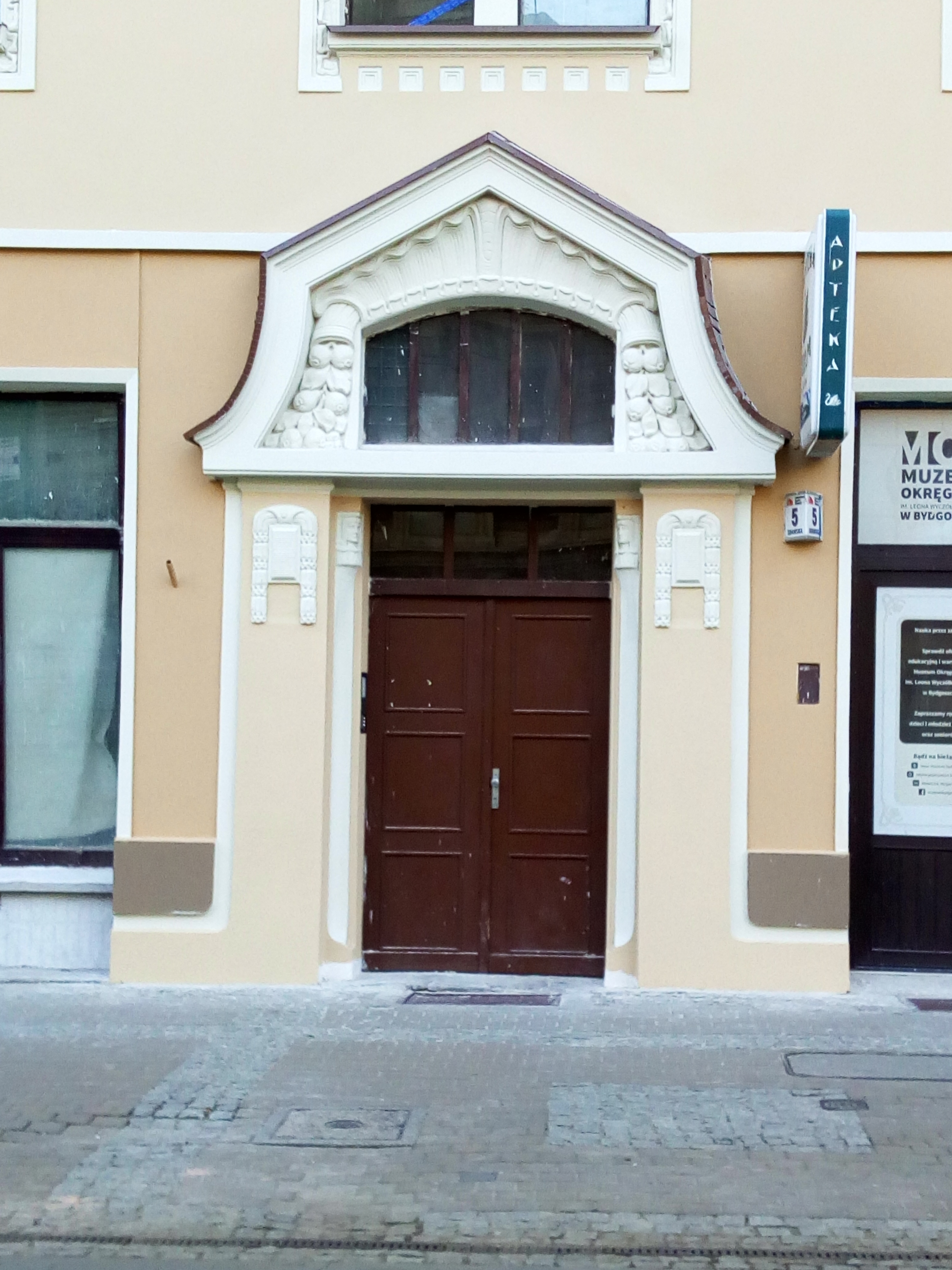
Portal

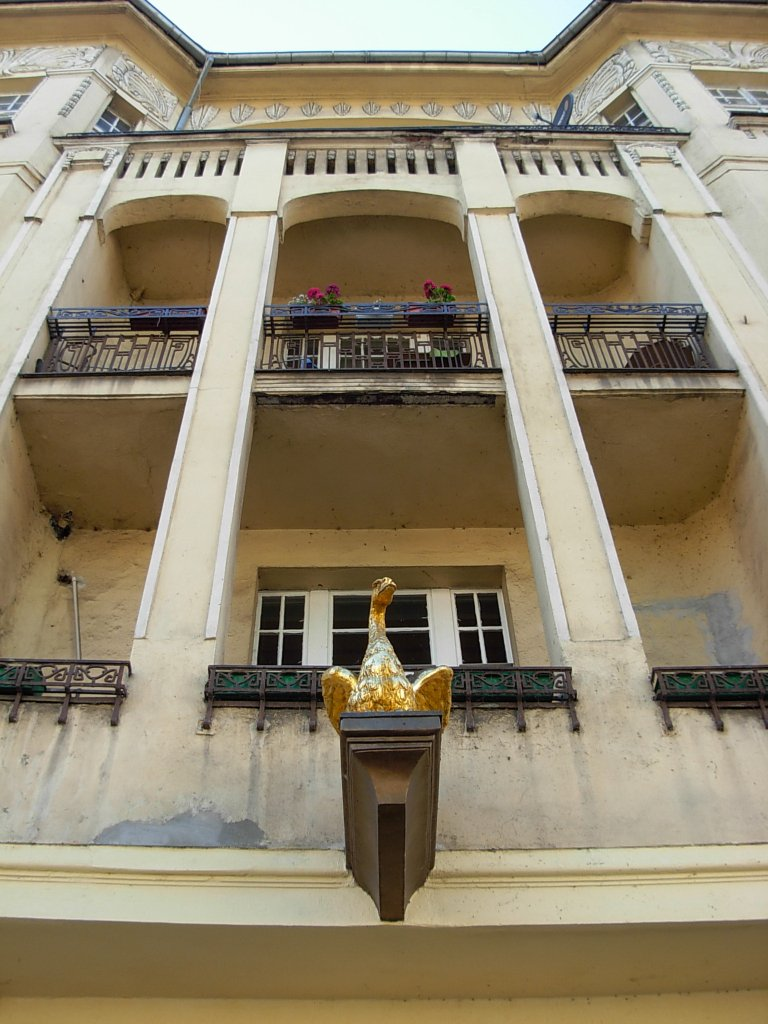
Front upward view

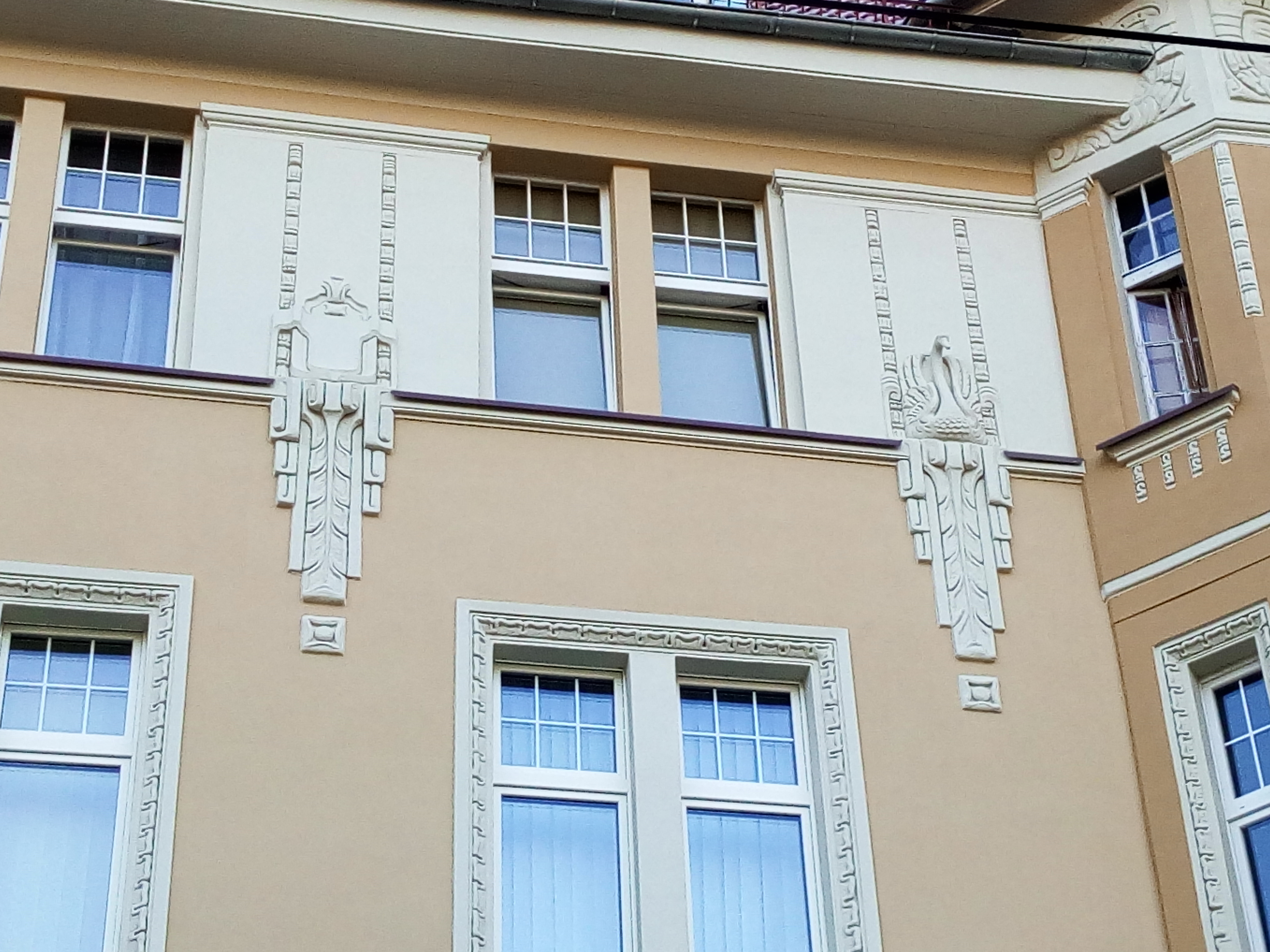
Art Nouveau motifs

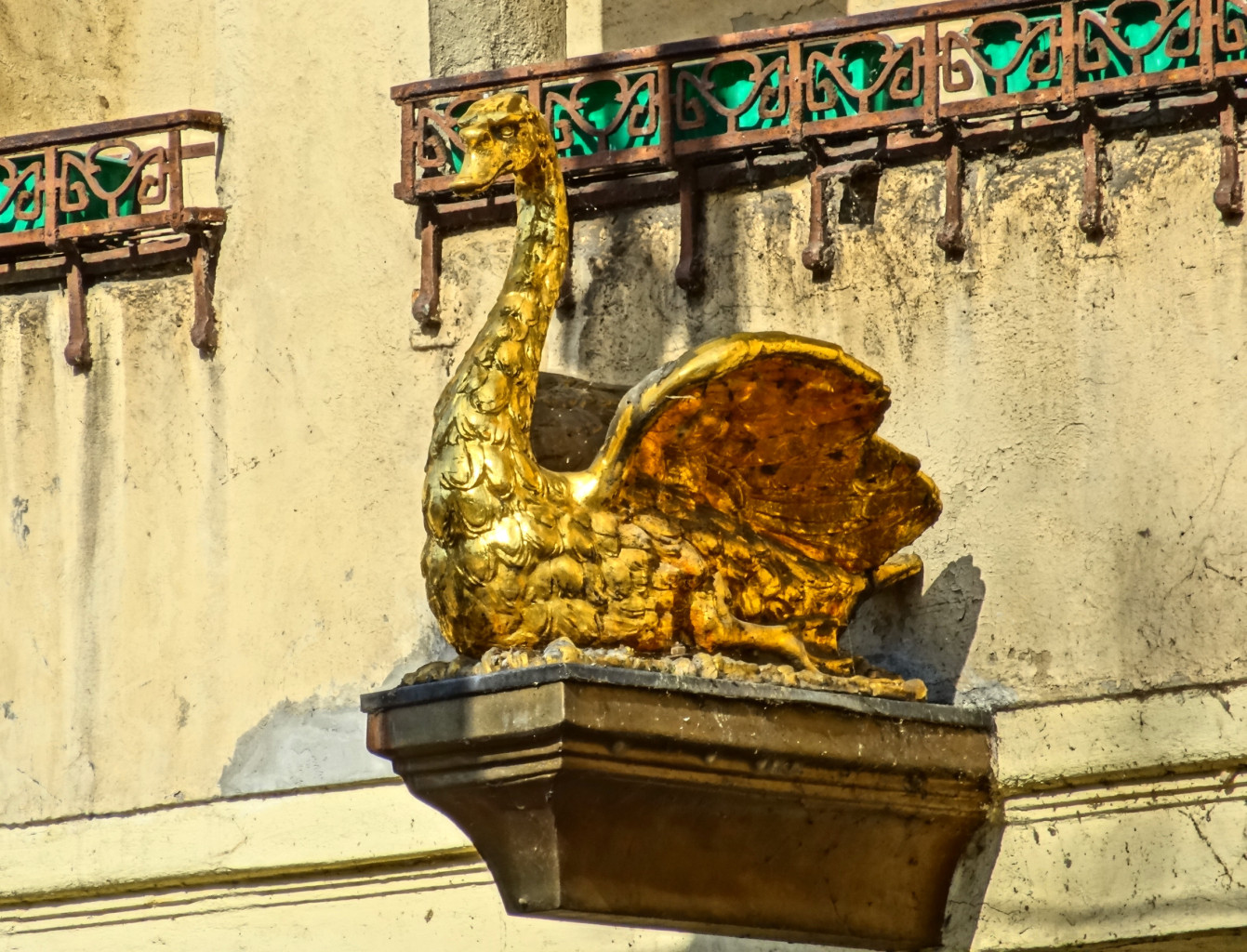
The Golden Swan

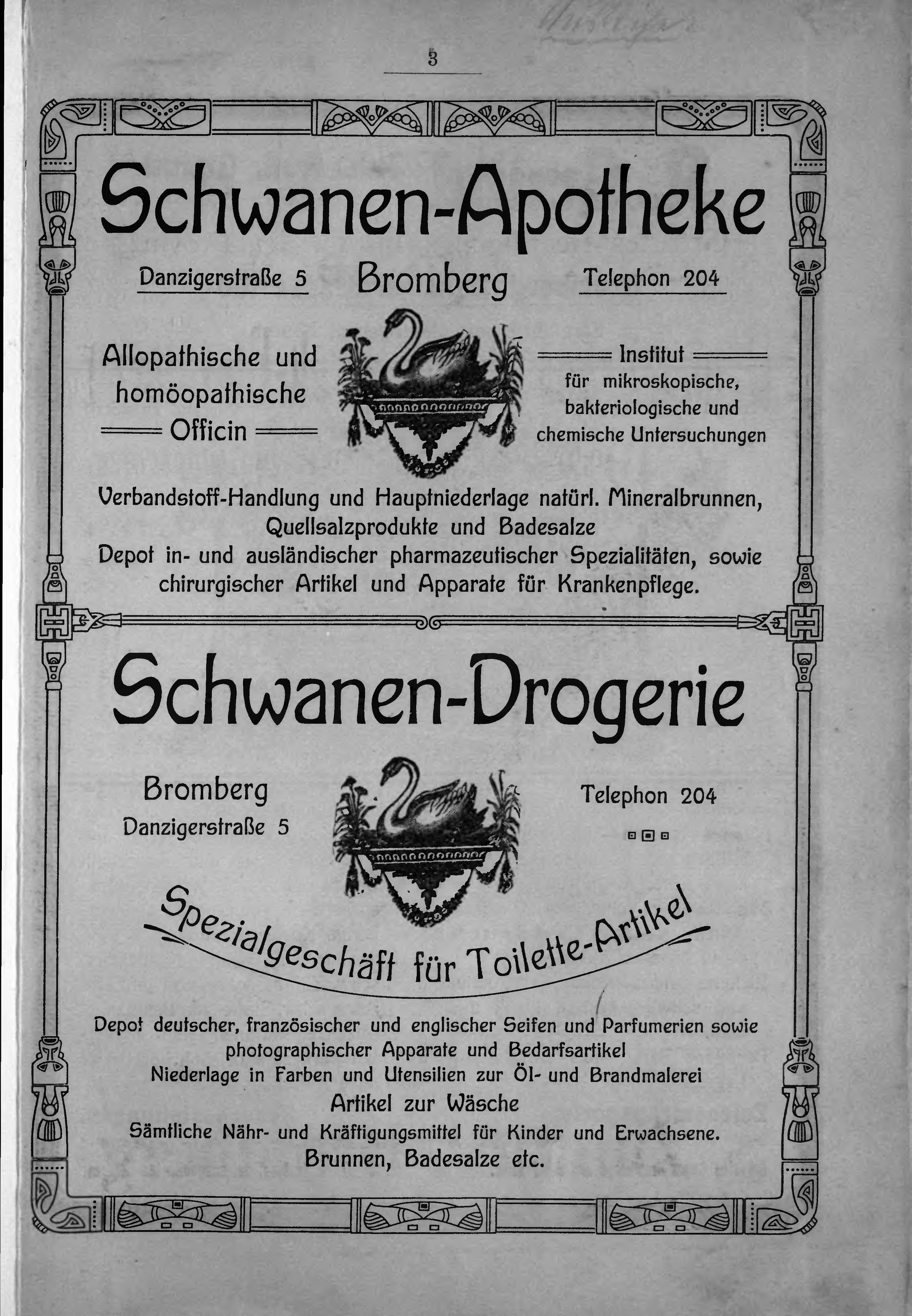
1910 Advertisement for the Pharmacy

== See also ==
- Gdanska Street in Bydgoszcz
- Bydgoszcz
- Rudolf Kern
- Kraków Museum of Pharmacy
- (in Polish) Bydgoszcz Pharmacy Museum

== Bibliography ==
- (in Polish) Bręczewska-Kulesza Daria, Derkowska-Kostkowska Bogna, Wysocka A. (2003). Ulica Gdańska. Przewodnik historyczny. Bydgoszcz: Wojewódzki Ośrodek Kultury w Bydgoszczy. ISBN 9788386970100.
- (in Polish) Ślusarczyk, Wojciech (2008). Łabędź z apteki. Kalendarz Bydgoski. Bydgoszcz: Towarzystwo Miłośników Miasta Bydgoszczy.
- (in Polish) Aleksander Drygas, Wojciech Ślusarczyk. Biblioteka Muzeum Farmacji Apteki "Pod Łabędziem" w Bydgoszczy. Bydgpszcz-Toruń: Collegium Medicum im. L. Rydygiera w Bydgoszczy/ Uniwersytet Mikołaja Kopernika w Toruniu.
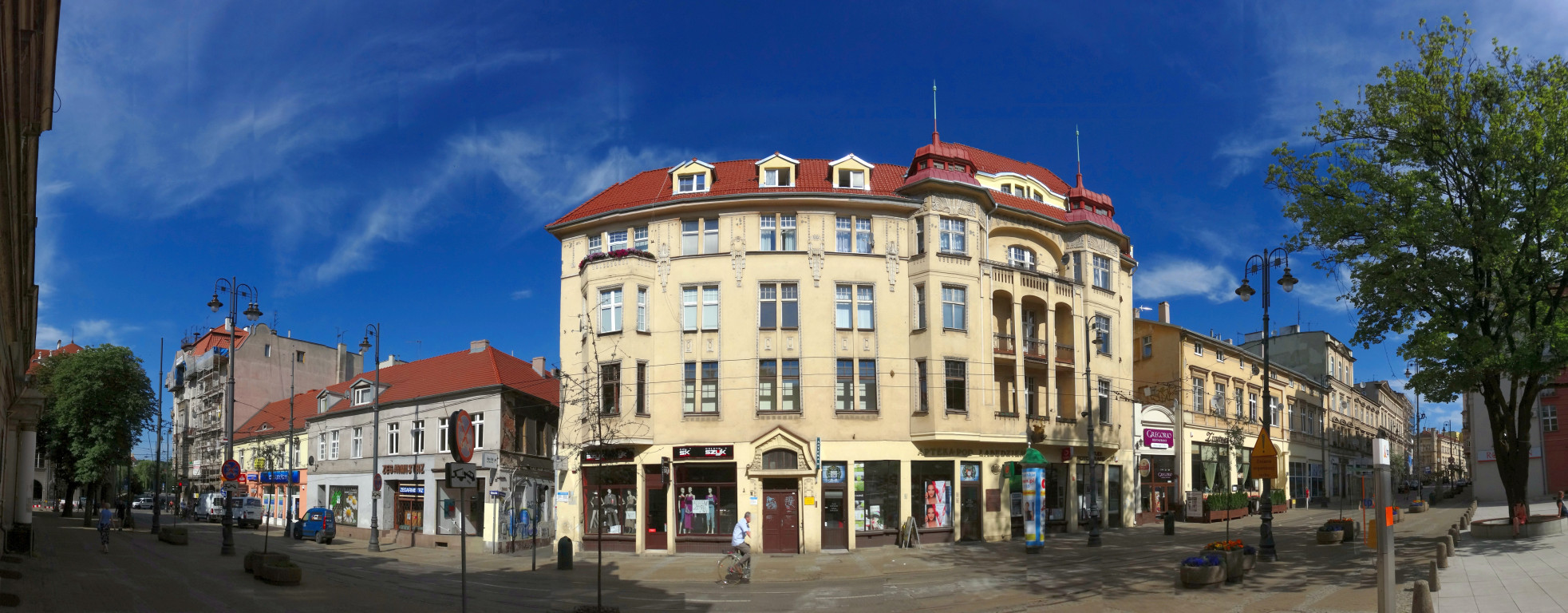
Tenement panorama from Gdańska Street
