= Paul Storz Tenement =

- Polish: Kamienica Paula Storza w Bydgoszczy
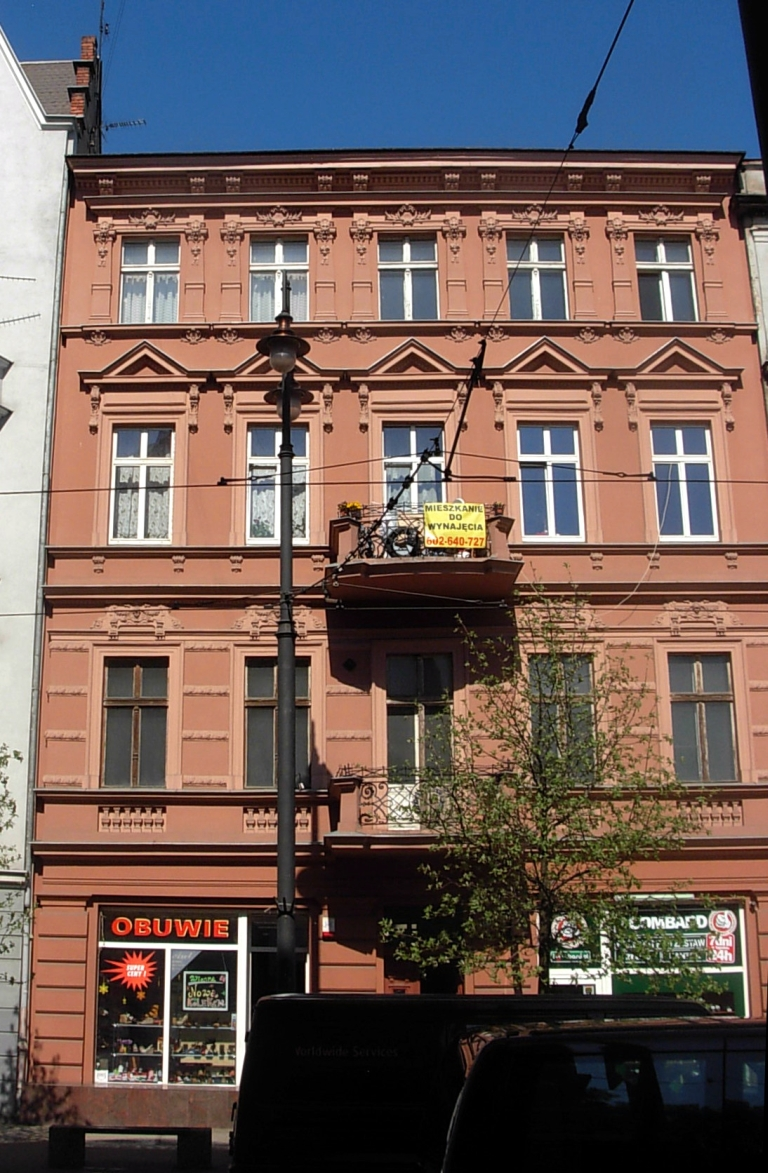
- Tenement from Gdańska Street

General information
- Type: Tenement
- Architectural style: Eclecticism & Mannerism
- Classification: N°601311-Reg.A/1056, 26 February 1997
- Location: 81 Gdańska Street, Bydgoszcz, Poland
- Coordinates: 53°7′54″N 18°0′32″E
- Completed: 1897
- Client: Paul Storz

Technical details
- Floor count: 4

Paul Storz Tenement is a habitation building located at 81 Gdańska Street, in Bydgoszcz, Poland. The edifice is registered on the Kuyavian-Pomeranian Voivodeship Heritage List.

== Location ==
The building stands on the western side of Gdańska Street, between Cieszkowskiego and Świętojańska streets.

It stands close to remarkable tenements in the same street:

- Alfred Schleusener Tenement at 62;
- Józef Święcicki tenement at 63;
- Eduard Schulz Tenement at 66/68;
- Tenement at 71 Gdańska street;
- Tenement at 75 Gdańska street;
- Ernst Bartsch tenement at 79.

== History ==
Building was constructed in 1897, for Paul Storz, a master carpenter.

At the time, the location of the building was 47a Danzigerstrasse, Bromberg.

The adjacent tenement at Nr.83, built in 1890 and following the same eclecticism style, has been owned by Carl Rose, designer of houses in the same street (16 Gdańska Street and 51 Gdańska Street).

== Architecture ==
The building was built following Eclecticism forms and elements of Mannerism.

The facade is decorated with stylized cartouches. Above first floor windows are placed panels with putto heads: this adornment was at the time a manifest against typical ornament rule.

Second floor windows are topped with classical pediments, and third floor windows are festooned on their side by pilasters topped with expressive masks.

The building has been put on the Kuyavian-Pomeranian Voivodeship Heritage List Nr.601311 Reg.A/1056, on 26 February 1997.

== Gallery ==
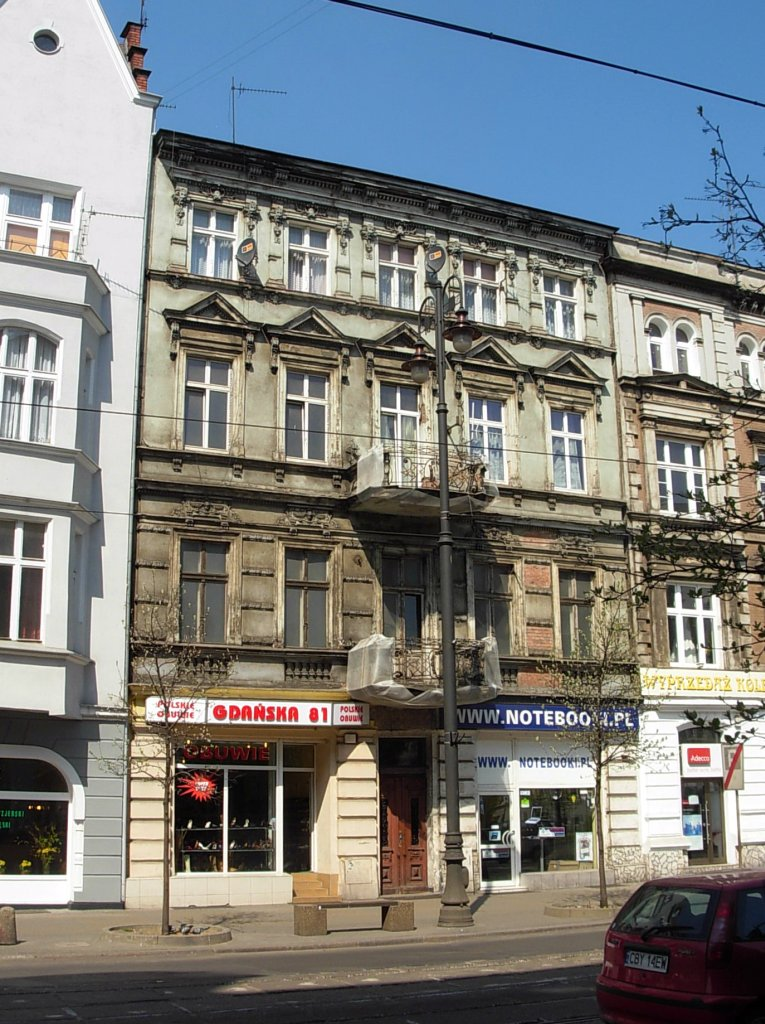
The building before renovation

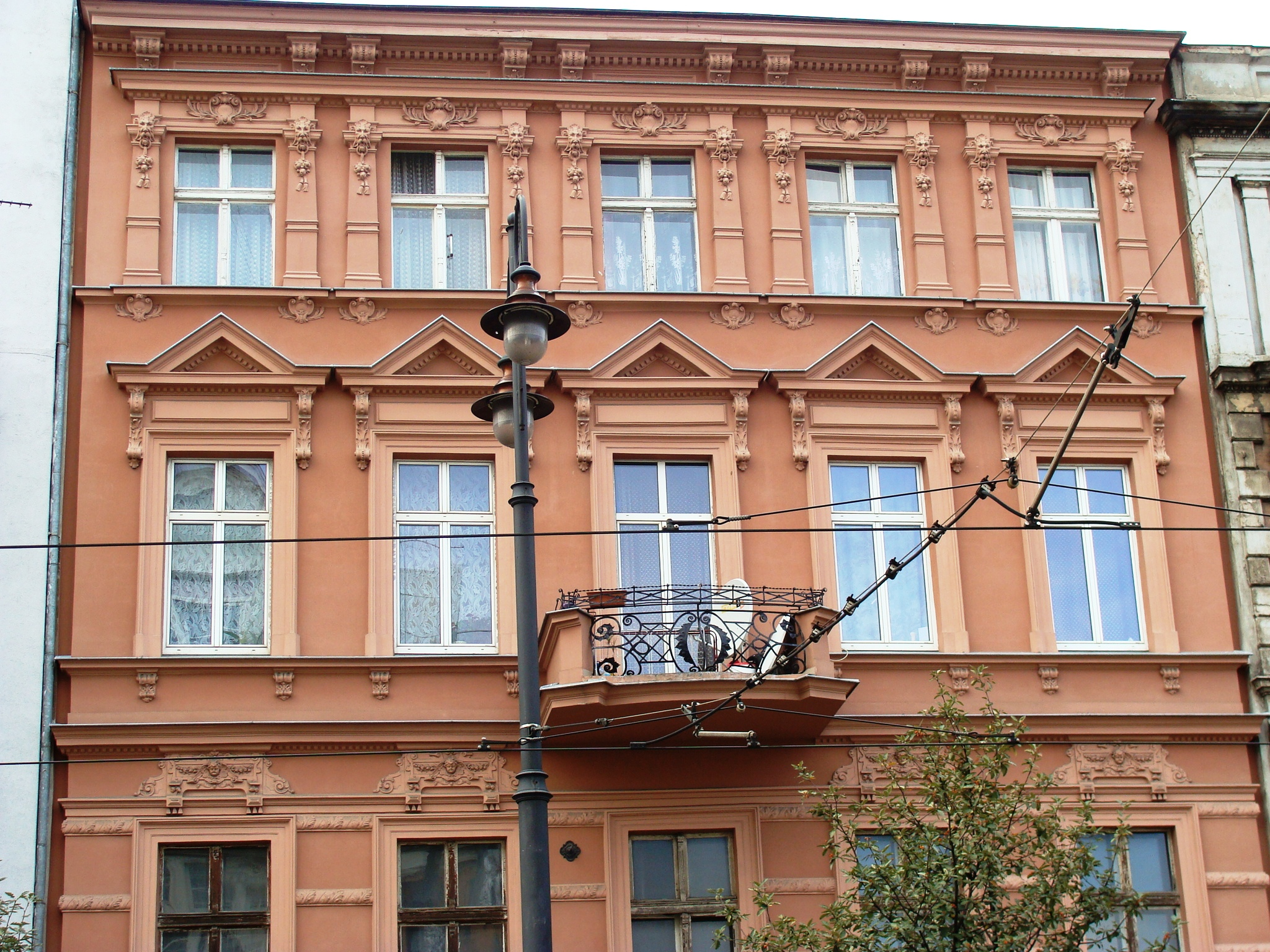
Elevation details

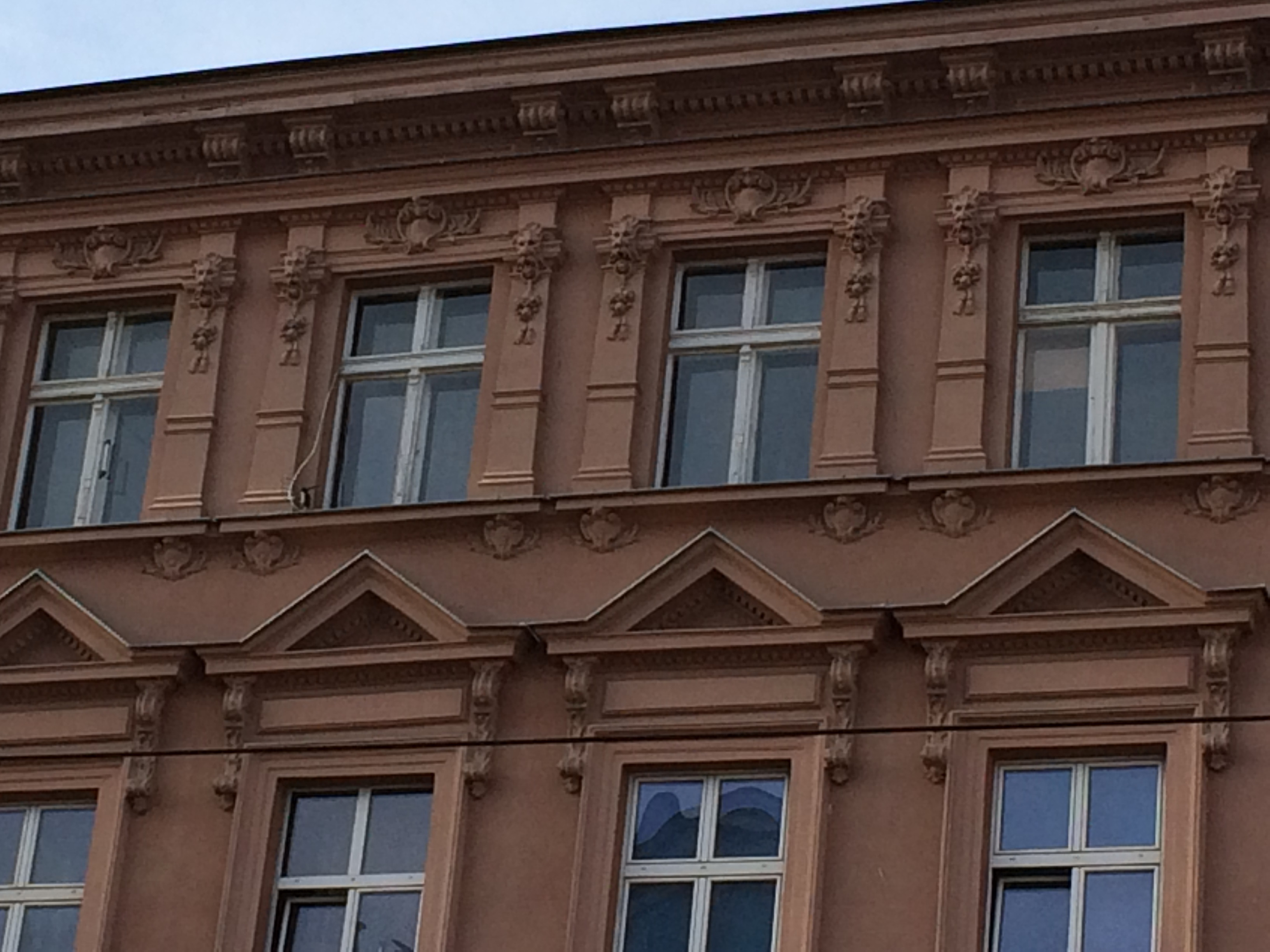
Details of 2nd and 3rd floor decoration

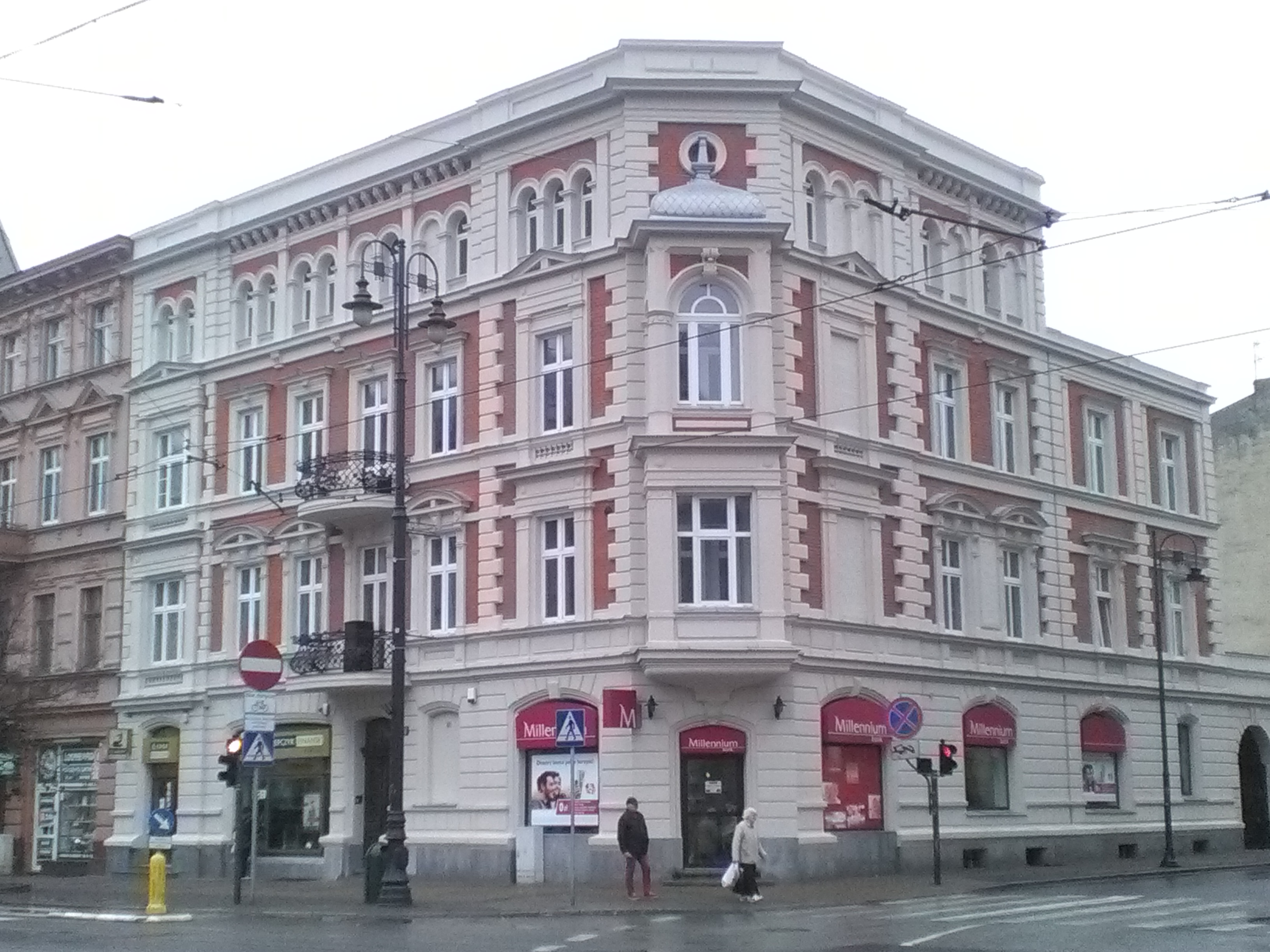
Adjacent house at Nr.83 (1890) owned by architect Carl Rose

== See also ==
- Bydgoszcz
- Gdanska Street in Bydgoszcz
- (in Polish) Downtown district in Bydgoszcz

== Bibliography ==
- (in Polish) Bręczewska-Kulesza Daria, Derkowska-Kostkowska Bogna, Wysocka A. (2003). Ulica Gdańska. Przewodnik historyczny. Bydgoszcz: Wojewódzki Ośrodek Kultury w Bydgoszczy. ISBN 9788386970100.
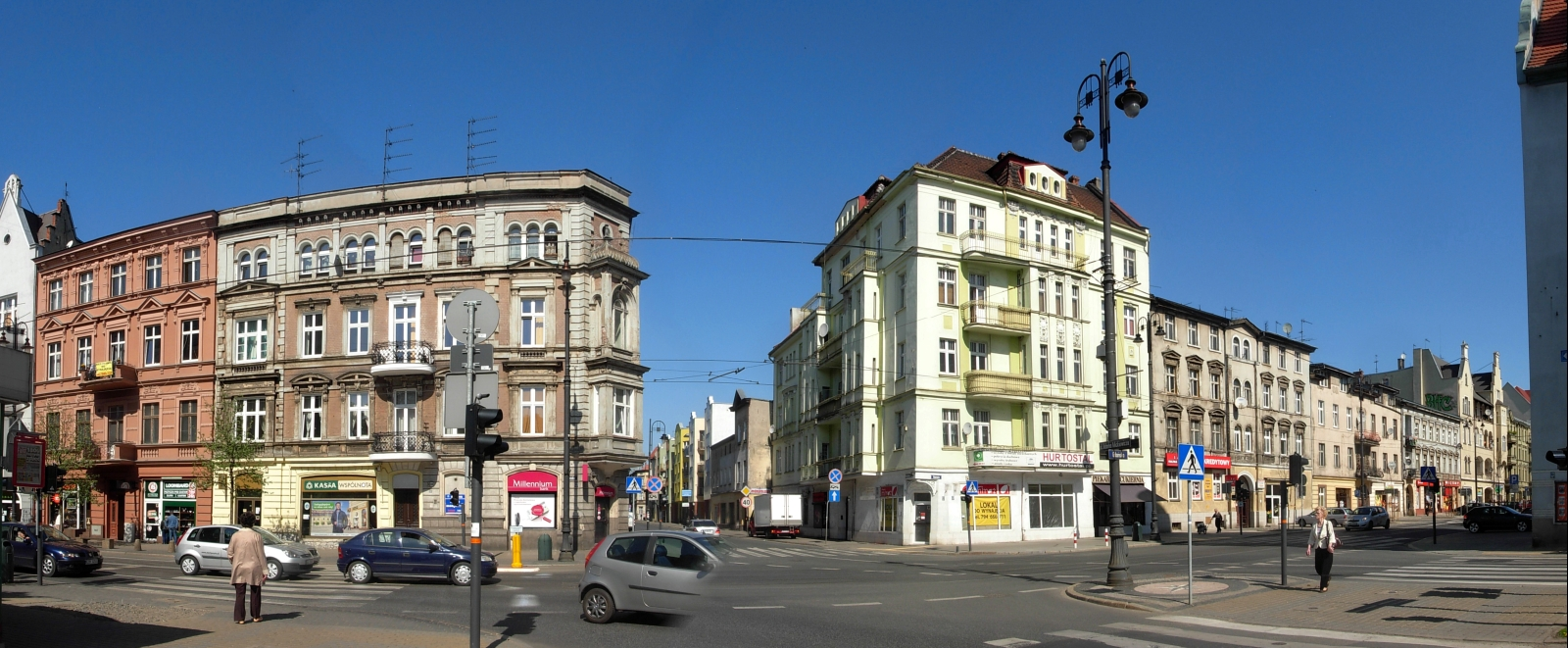
Panorama of Gdańska and Świętojańską streets intersection. Paul Storz Tenement is on the left
