= Pharmacy Museum of the Jagiellonian University Medical College =

Museum in Kraków, Poland

Coordinates: 50°03′47″N 19°56′25″E

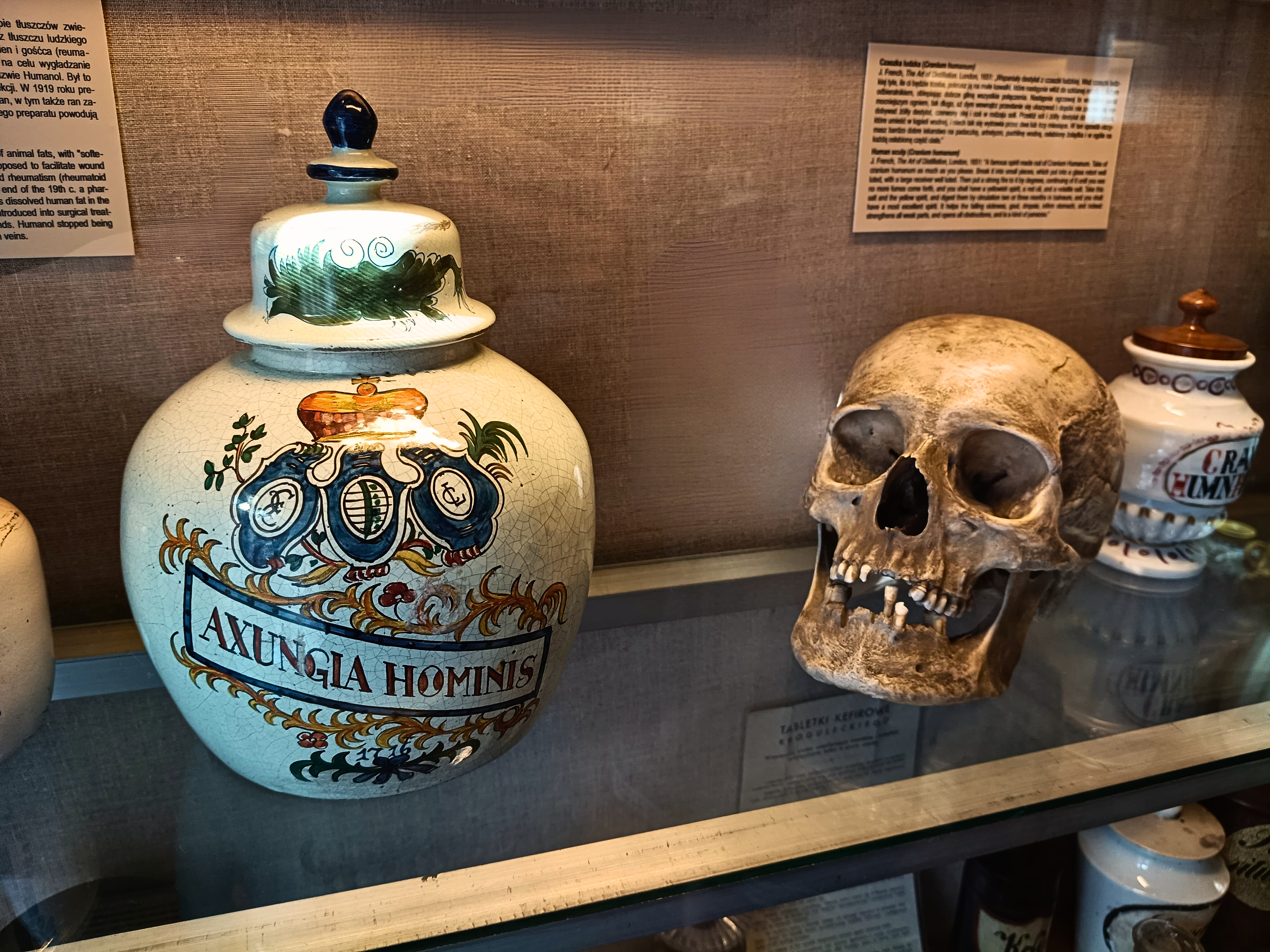

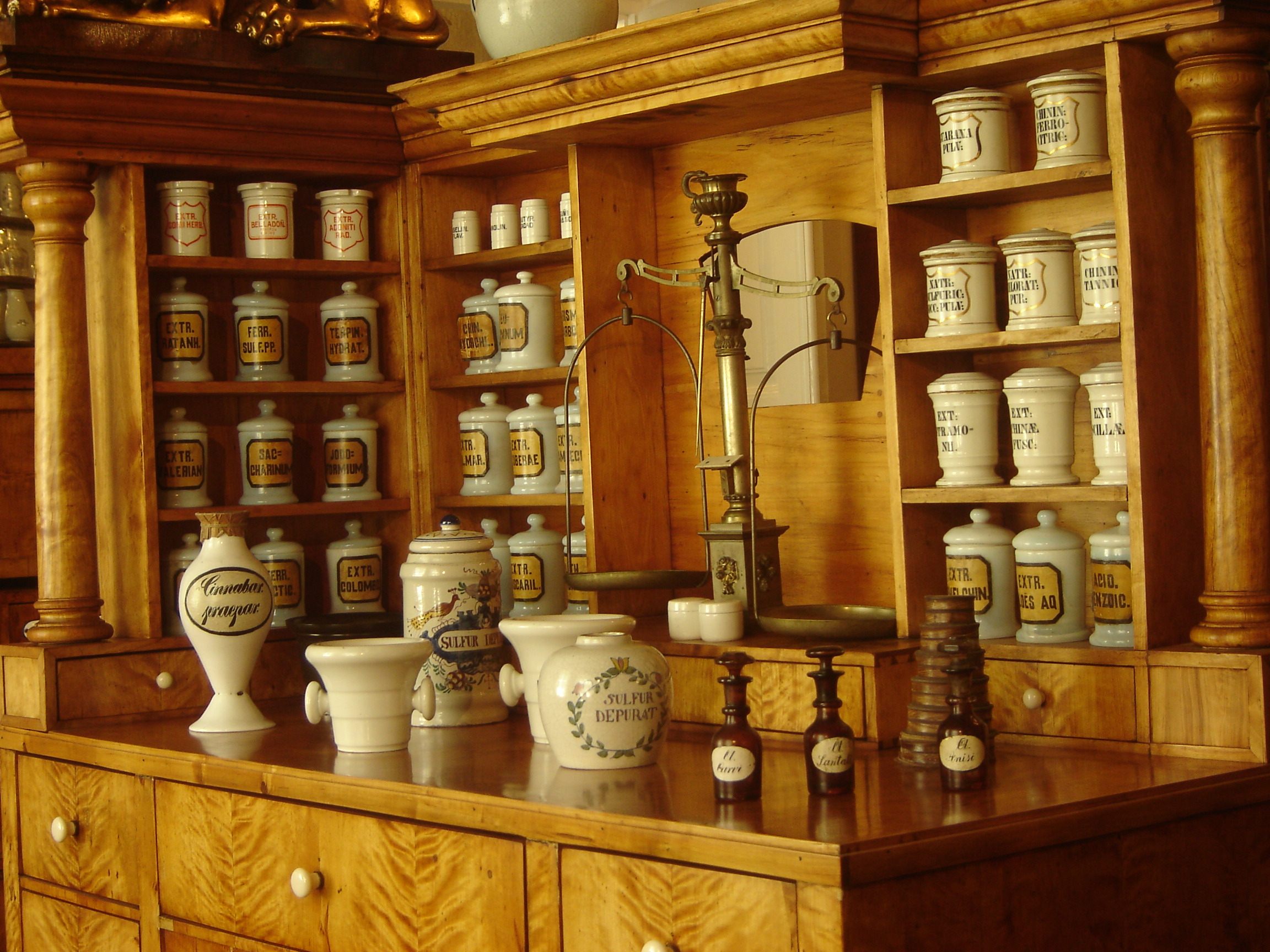

Muzeum Farmacji Collegium Medicum Uniwersytetu Jagiellońskiego (Pharmacy Museum, Jagiellonian University Medical College) is a museum on Floriańska Street, Kraków, Poland, specializing in the history of pharmacy and pharmaceutical technology. It was established in 1946.

The museum was founded by Stanisław Proń, legal counsel and administrative director of the Regional Chamber of Pharmacists in Kraków. Until the late 1980s, the museum was housed in the building at 3 ul. Basztowa. It was then transferred to the newly renovated building at ul. St. Florian's, where it remains today.

It is the largest and oldest Museum of Pharmacy in Poland, and one of the largest museums of its kind in the world.

The museum occupies all five floors of the building, including the basement and the attic, in a manner appropriate to the historical use of such premises in as an apothecary. On the first floor is a room dedicated to Ignacy Łukasiewicz, a pharmacist, pioneer in the field of crude oil, and the inventor of the modern kerosene lamp. The room on the second floor of the exhibition is devoted to Tadeusz Pankiewicz, a Roman Catholic who ran the "Under the Eagle" pharmacy in the Kraków Ghetto during the Nazi occupation of Poland. Among the various exhibits of pharmaceutical technology are weights of less than one gram as patented by Marian Zahradnik, the shape of which indicates their importance. Such weights were adopted in the countries of the Austro-Hungarian Empire and later across Europe, and are still used with minor modifications. Another interesting invention is an electrical device to sterilize prescriptions. It was to protect the pharmacist from infection by germs transferred on the prescription.
