= Gdańsk Street 71, Bydgoszcz =

Tenement at 71 Gdańska street
- Polish: Kamienica przy ul. Gdańskiej 71 w Bydgoszczy
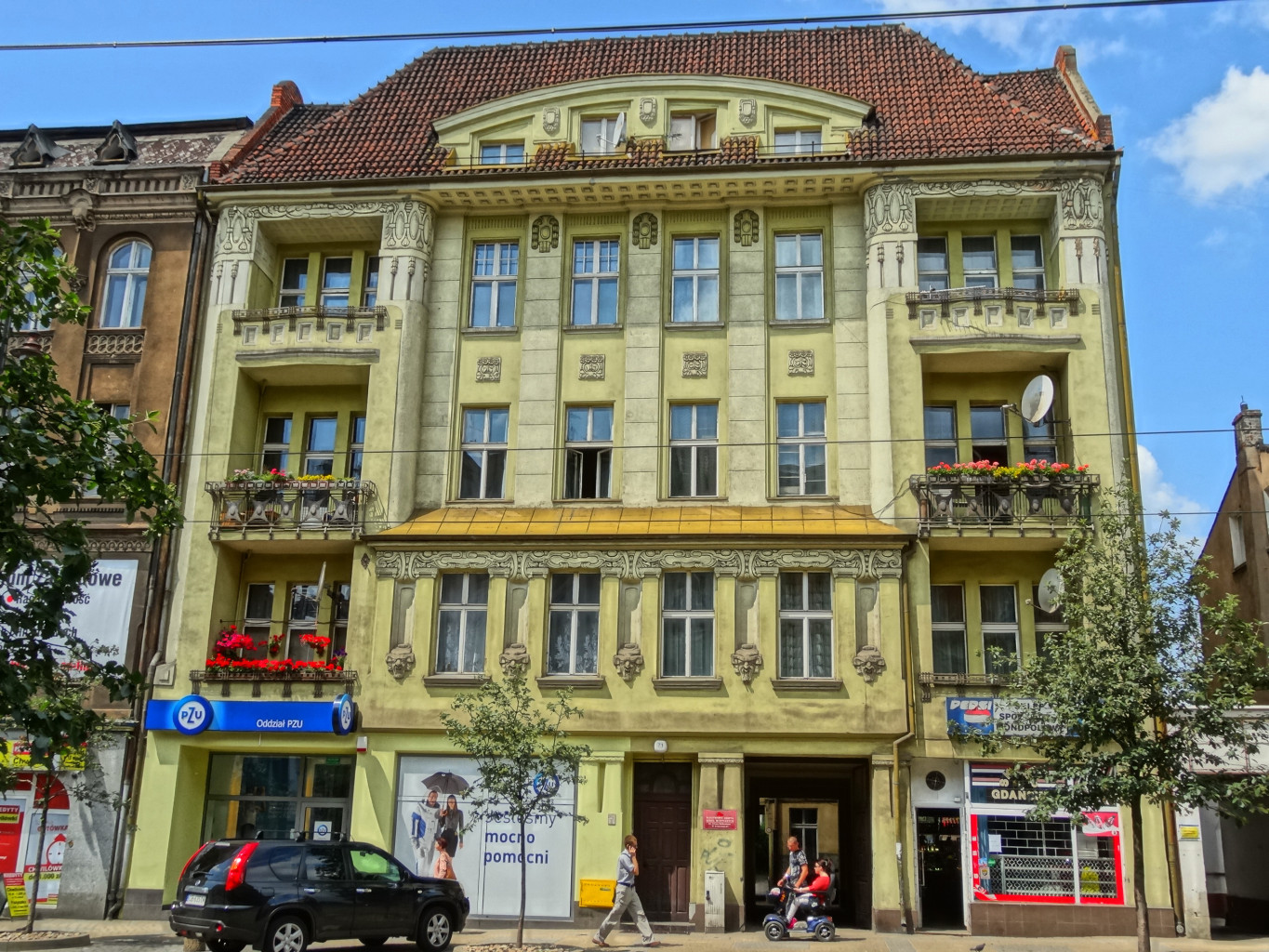
- Tenement from Gdańska Street
- Interactive map of the Tenement at 71 Gdańska street area

General information
- Type: Tenement
- Architectural style: Modern architecture & Eclecticism
- Location: 71 Gdańska Street, Bydgoszcz, Poland
- Coordinates: 53°7′52″N 18°0′30″E
- Groundbreaking: 1906
- Completed: 1907

Technical details
- Floor count: 5

Design and construction
- Architect: Rudolf Kern

Tenement at 71 Gdańska street is a habitation building located on Gdańska Street, in Bydgoszcz, Poland.

== Location ==
The building stands on the western side of Gdańska Street, between Cieszkowskiego and Świętojańska streets.

It is located close to remarkable tenements in the same street:

- Alfred Schleusener Tenement at 62;
- Józef Święcicki tenement at 63;
- Eduard Schulz Tenement at 66/68.

== History ==
The house was built in 1906–1907, designed by the architect Rudolf Kern, who also erected or redesigned other buildings in Gdańska Street:

- August Mentzel Tenement at 5;
- Tenement at 67 Gdańska street;
- Eduard Schulz Tenement at 66/68.

After the construction, a surgeon, Dr Dettmer had his clinic in the back, as well as his private house. At Bromberg's time, the address was 42 DanzigerStrasse.

In 1924, the Office of the City bought the building and organized here the Obstetrics and Gynecology Department of the Municipal Hospital, which was surrounded by a garden.

In 1934, the headquarters of the Polish Army Corps District Nr. VIII was located there.

The tenement has been the seat, since 1938–1939, of the Municipal Conservatoire, and between 1945 and 1958 it housed the school headquarters.

Currently, the building in the backyard (where stood the clinic) is owned by the Music Schools of Bydgoszcz. A concert hall, named John Paul II Aula (concert hall) is located here.

== Architecture ==
The building presents architectural forms of Modern architecture and Eclecticism. The facade is adorned with stylish ornaments, such as Auricular style details, characteristic of Mannerism and Rococo periods.

The massive facade is flanked by two piles of balconies with wrought iron balustrade.

The first floor is decorated with bas-reliefs and gargoyles, whereas the third level is enriched with cartouches and upper friezes.

The curved dormer, enriched with floral cartouches, caps the whole elevation.

== Gallery ==
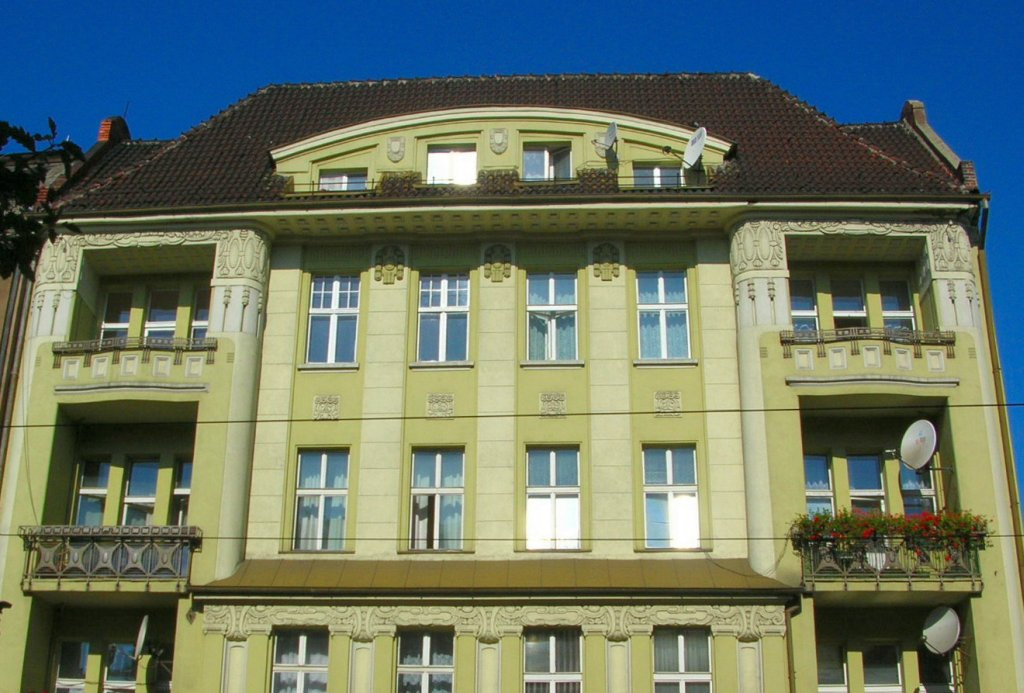
Upper part view

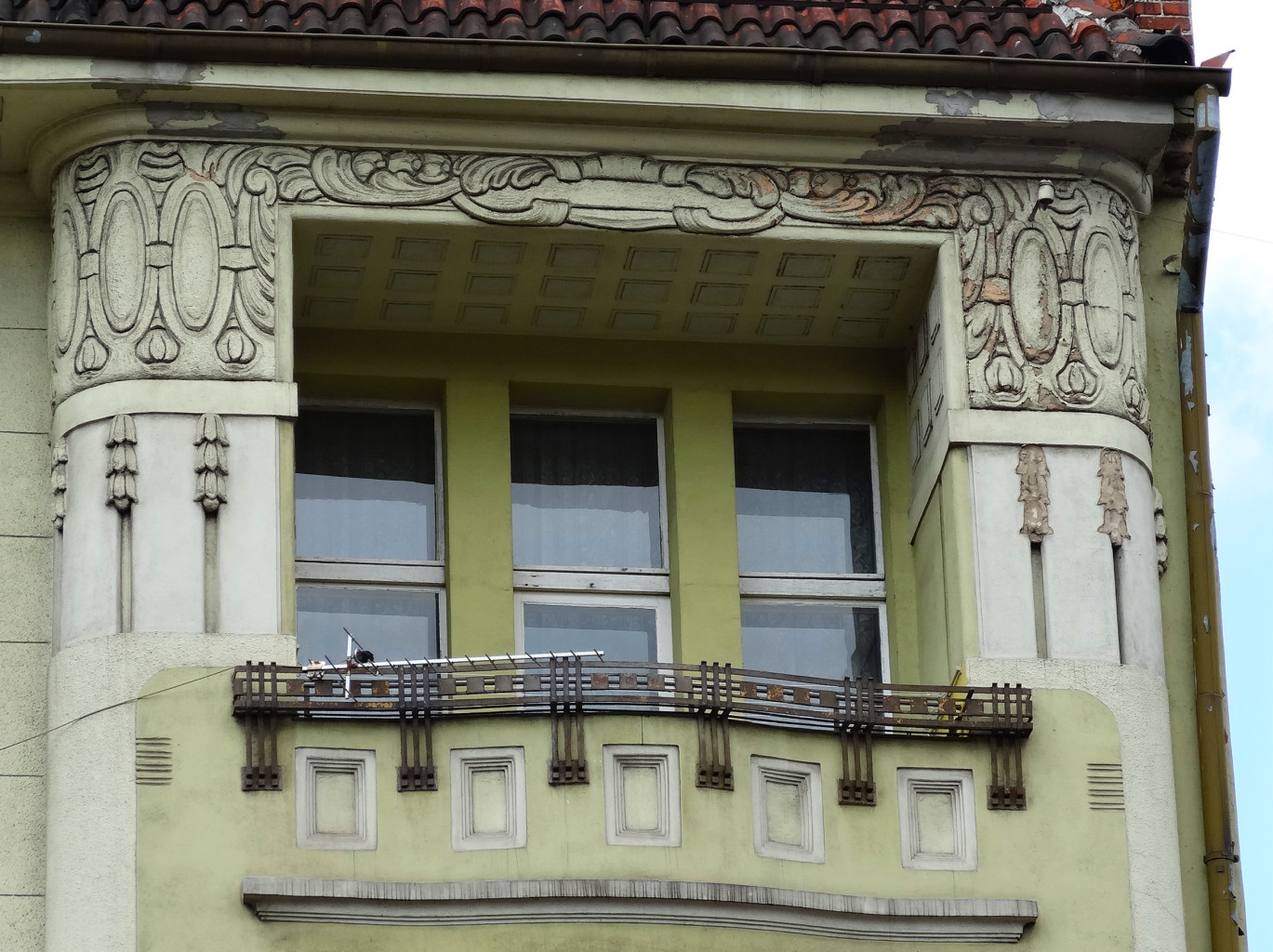
Loggia

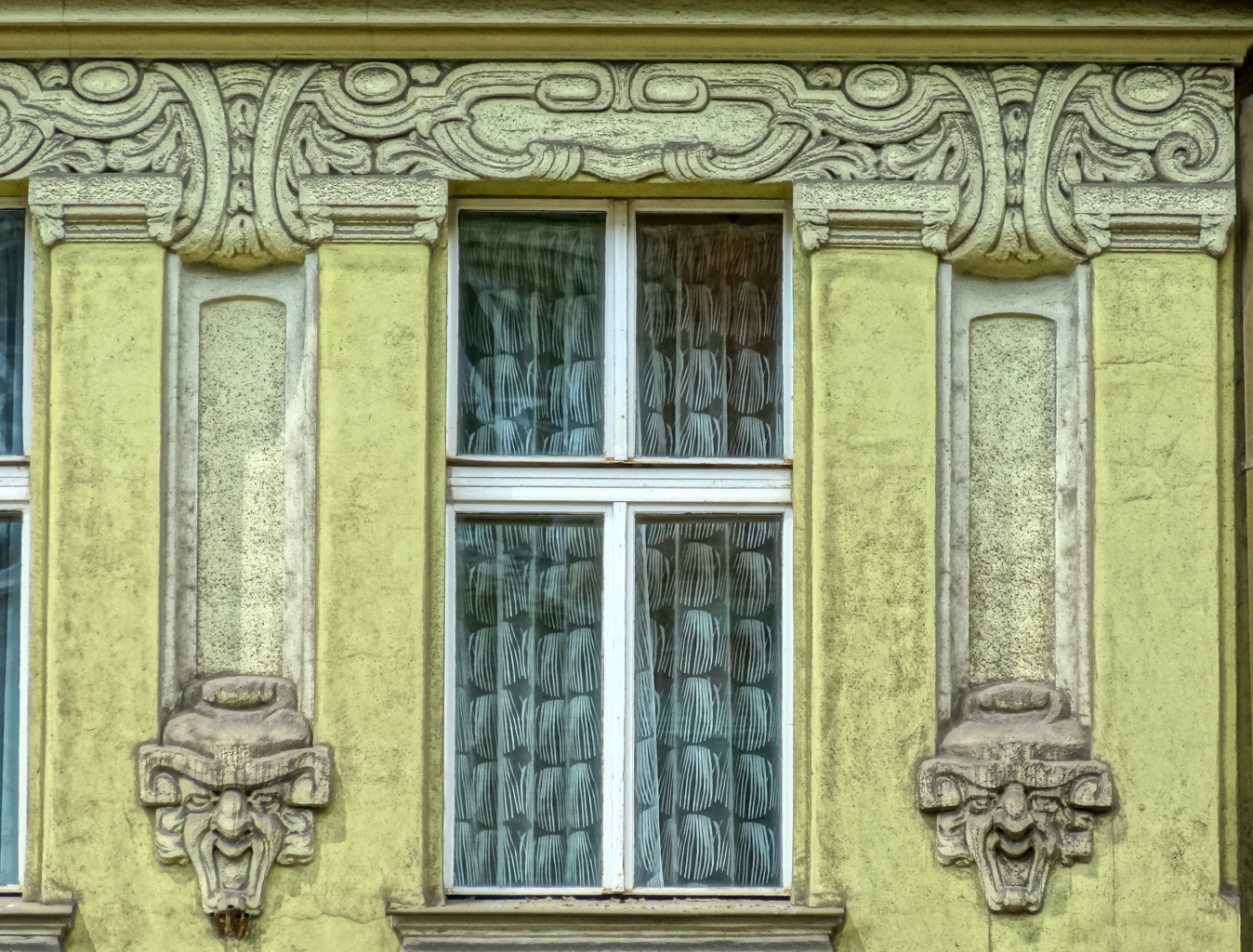
Art Nouveau friezes and gargoyles

== See also ==
- Bydgoszcz
- Gdanska Street in Bydgoszcz
- Music Schools Group in Bydgoszcz
- Rudolf Kern
- (in Polish) Downtown district in Bydgoszcz

== Bibliography ==
- (in Polish) Bręczewska-Kulesza Daria, Derkowska-Kostkowska Bogna, Wysocka A. (2003). Ulica Gdańska. Przewodnik historyczny. Bydgoszcz: Wojewódzki Ośrodek Kultury w Bydgoszczy. ISBN 9788386970100.
