= Gdańsk Street 75, Bydgoszcz =

Historical Building

Tenement at 75 Gdańska street
- Polish: Kamienica Gdańska 75 w Bydgoszczy
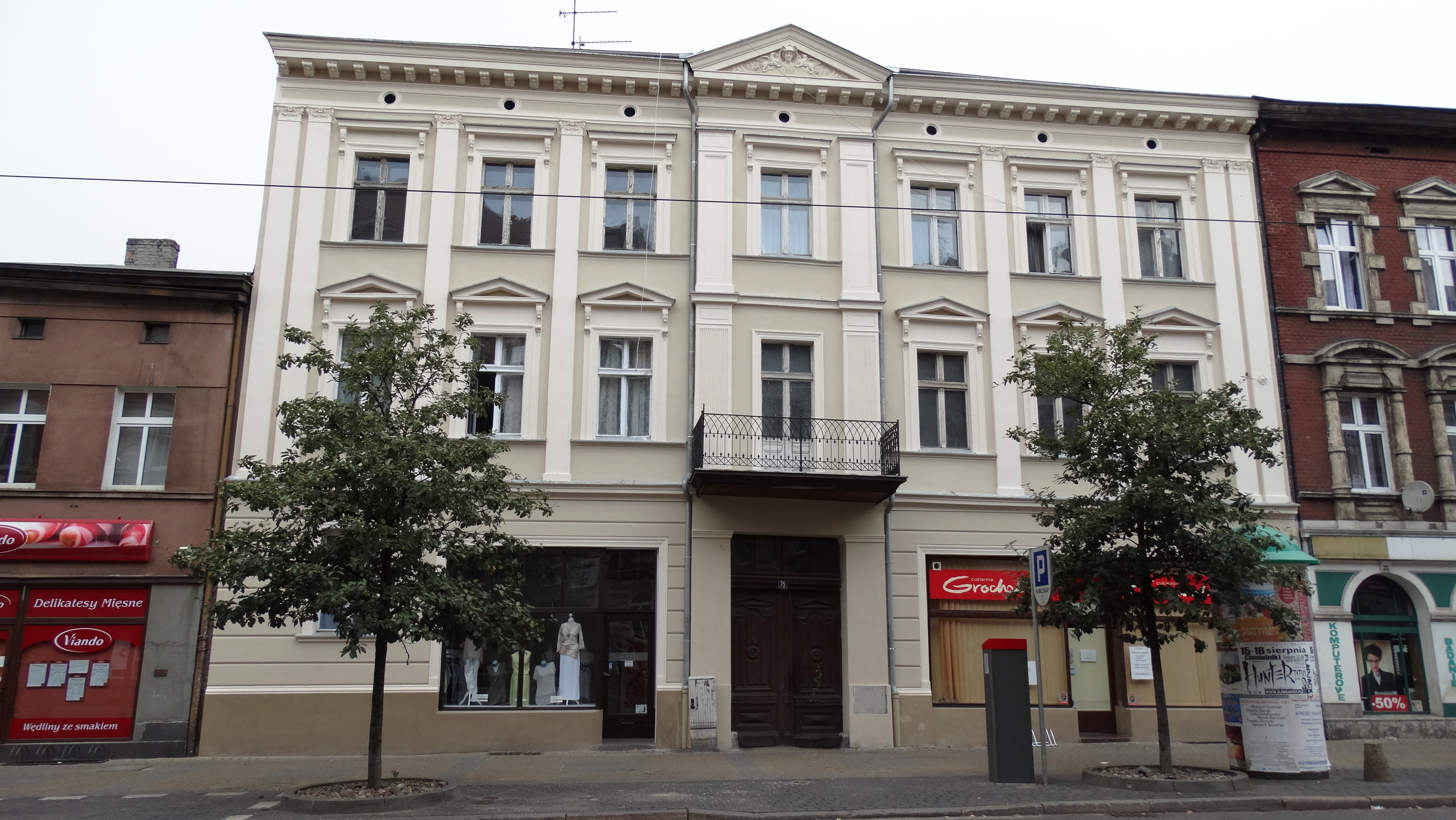
- Tenement from Gdańska Street

General information
- Type: Tenement
- Architectural style: Eclecticism
- Classification: Nr.601310-Reg.A/893, 12 November 1992
- Location: 75 Gdańska Street, Bydgoszcz, Poland
- Coordinates: 53°7′53″N 18°0′31″E
- Completed: 1883

Technical details
- Floor count: 3

Tenement at 75 Gdańska street is a historical habitation building located at 75 Gdańska Street, in Bydgoszcz. It is registered on the Kuyavian-Pomeranian Voivodeship Heritage List.

== Location ==
The building stands on the western side of Gdańska Street, between Cieszkowskiego and Świętojańska streets. It stands close to notable tenements in the same street including: the Alfred Schleusener Tenement at 62, the Józef Święcicki tenement at 63, the Eduard Schulz Tenement at 66/68 and the Tenement at 71 Gdańska street.

== History ==
The house was built in 1883.

In 1910 Wladyslaw Niezgodzki, a butcher, set up two shops on the ground floor. Several members of his family were butchers as well in Bromberg: Franz in Gdańska Street and Maryan in Długa Street. The shop stood there until 1928.

== Architecture ==
The building was built in the eclecticism style, with Neoclassical forms, including: the facade is divided by slender pilasters, windows are topped with triangular pediments supported by corbels and a frontispiece adorned with a hermes's head overhangs the gate.

The building has been put on the Kuyavian-Pomeranian Voivodeship Heritage List Nr.601310 Reg.A/893, on November 12, 1992.

== Gallery ==
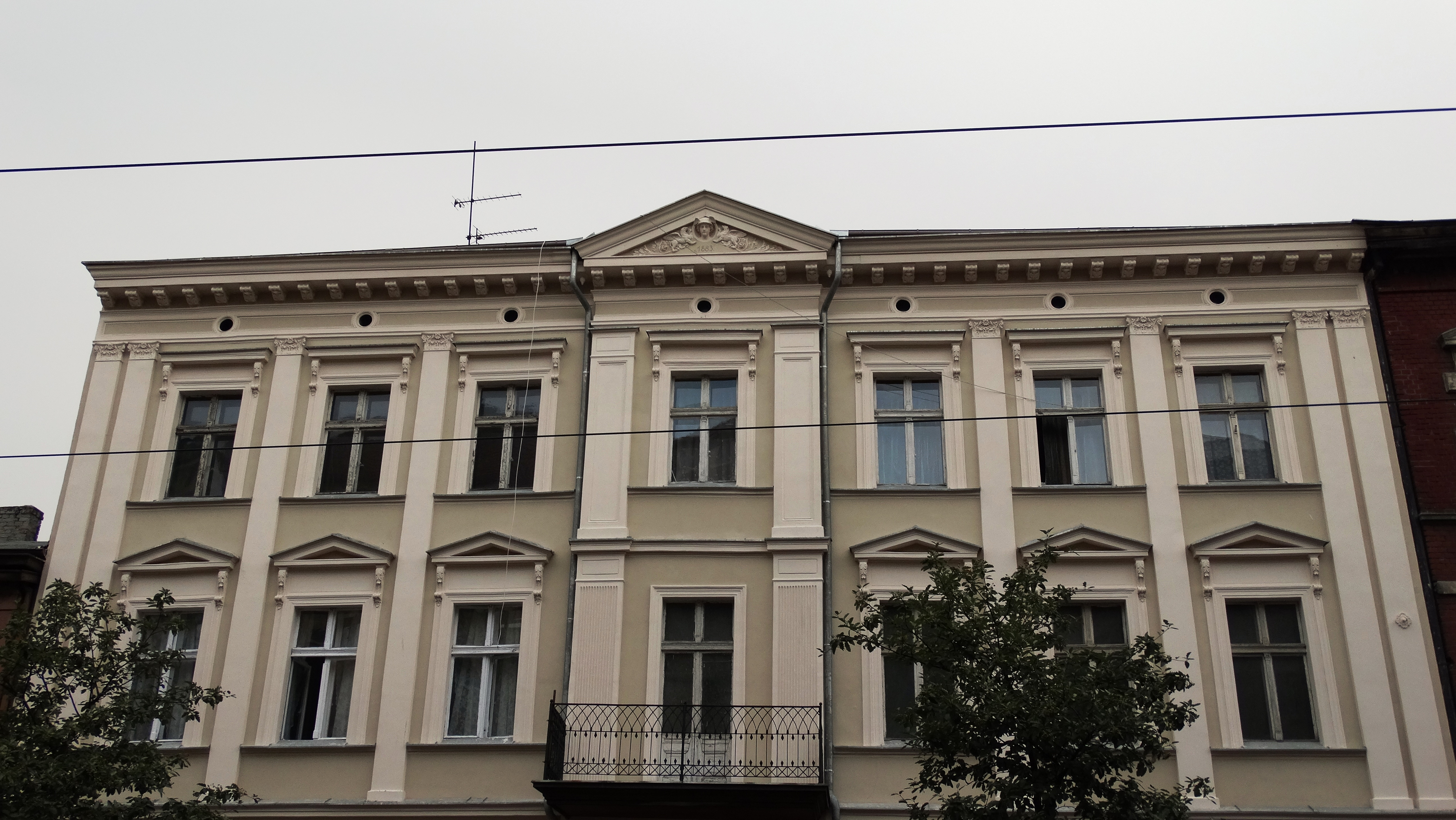
Details of the upper levels

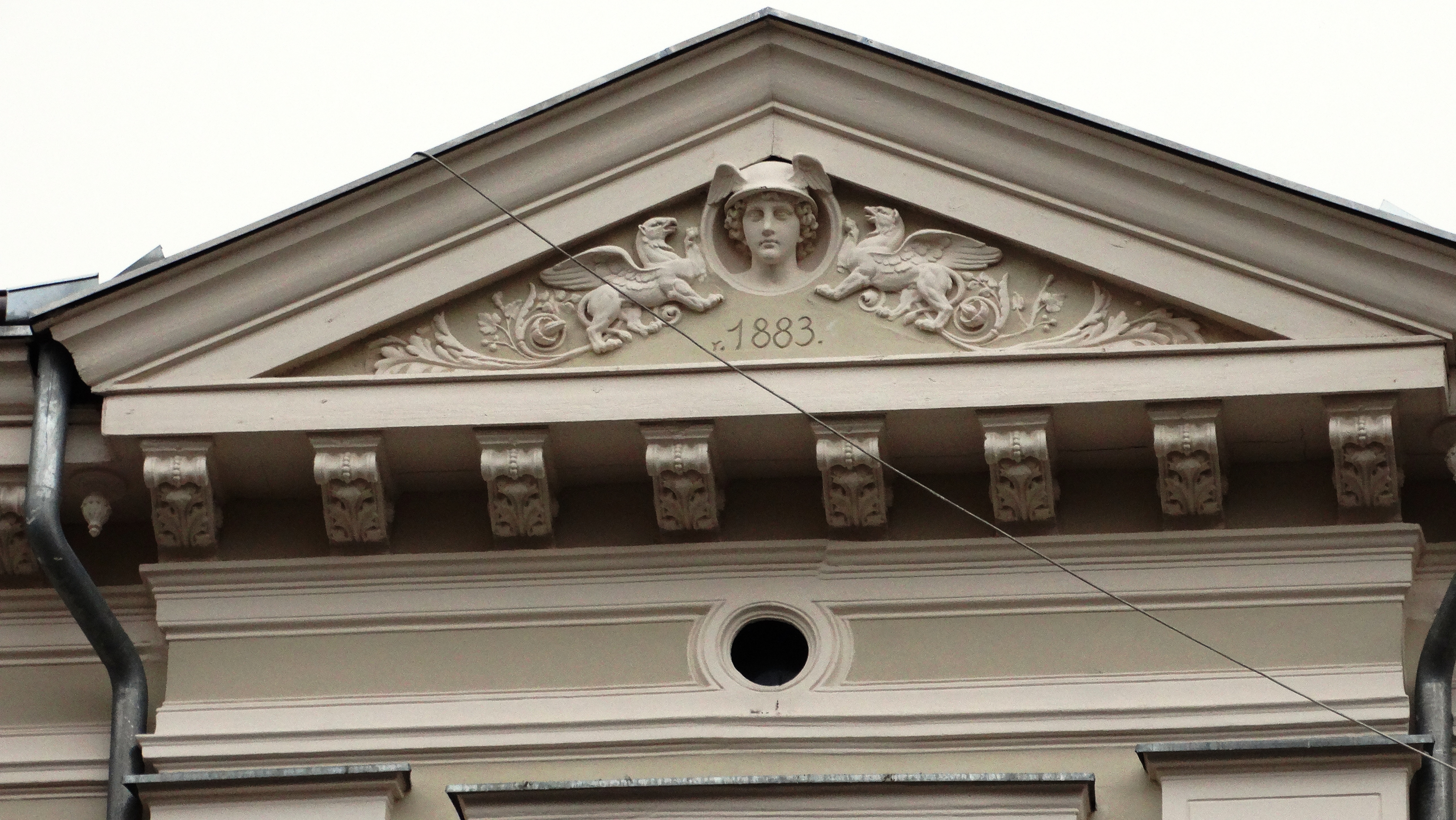
Frontispiece

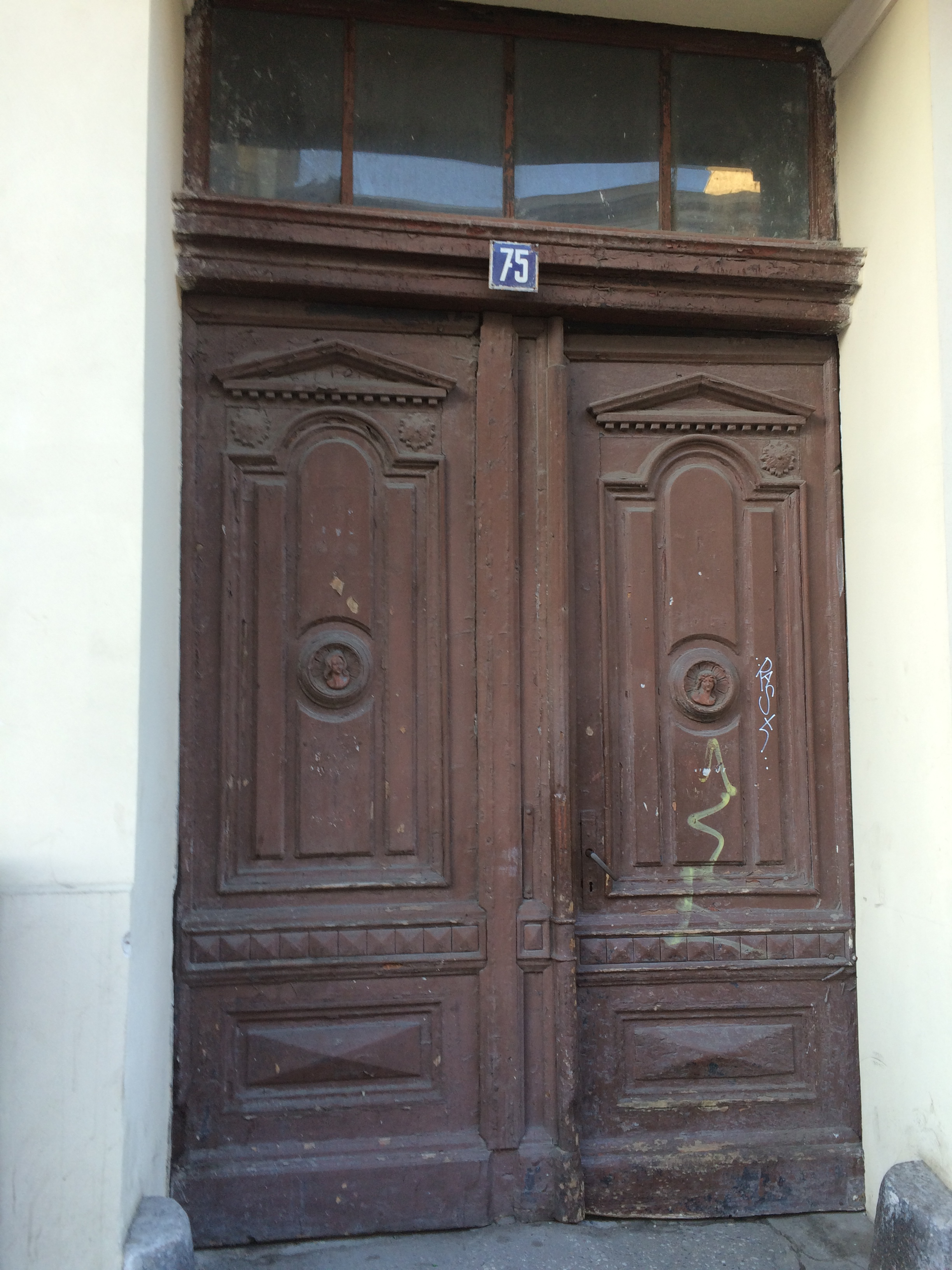
Gate detail

== See also ==
- Bydgoszcz
- Gdanska Street in Bydgoszcz
- (in Polish) Downtown district in Bydgoszcz

== Bibliography ==
- (in Polish) Bręczewska-Kulesza Daria, Derkowska-Kostkowska Bogna, Wysocka A. (2003). Ulica Gdańska. Przewodnik historyczny. Bydgoszcz: Wojewódzki Ośrodek Kultury w Bydgoszczy. ISBN 9788386970100.
