= Rudolf Kern =

German architect and builder (1871–1952)

- Born: Rudolf Richard Hermann Kern; 14 June, 1871; Thorn, German Empire (now Poland)
- Died: 2 February 1952 (aged 80); Bremen, West Germany
- Occupation: Architect
- Years active: 1903–1952
- Spouse: Franziska Johanna Preiss
- Children: Werner and Günther-Heinz

Rudolf Richard Hermann Kern (14 June 1871 – 2 February 1952) was a German architect and builder who worked in Bydgoszcz during the late Prussian era. Between 1903 and 1914, he designed a series of tenements and villas, several of which have been preserved.

== Early life ==
Kern was born on 14 June 1871 in Thorn (now Toruń, Poland), which was a part of the German Empire. He received his early education in local Prussian schools before pursuing technical and architectural studies.

== Career ==
Kern is believed to have trained in the studio of Józef Święcicki. From 1903 to the early 1920s, Kern operated his own architectural and construction office, which designed and built several tenement buildings that were later sold to real estate brokers, including several located on Cieszkowskiego Street.

In 1907, Kern published an article on the design of a villa made for Max Eichenberg in the architectural journal Ostdeutsche Bauzeitung. Kern lived in Bydgoszcz in the Rudolf Kern Building at the corner of Gdańsk Street and Adam Mickiewicz Alley until 1922.

== Architectural style ==
Kern’s architectural work is associated with the Art Nouveau style, incorporating both stylistic and functional elements characteristic of the movement. In 1912, one of his projects was recognized in a municipal architectural competition, alongside a design by Fritz Weidner.

== See also ==
- Bydgoszcz
- Architects from Bydgoszcz (1850-1970s)
- List of Polish people
