= Alfred Schleusener Tenement =

- Polish: Kamienica Alfreda Schleusenera w Bydgoszczy
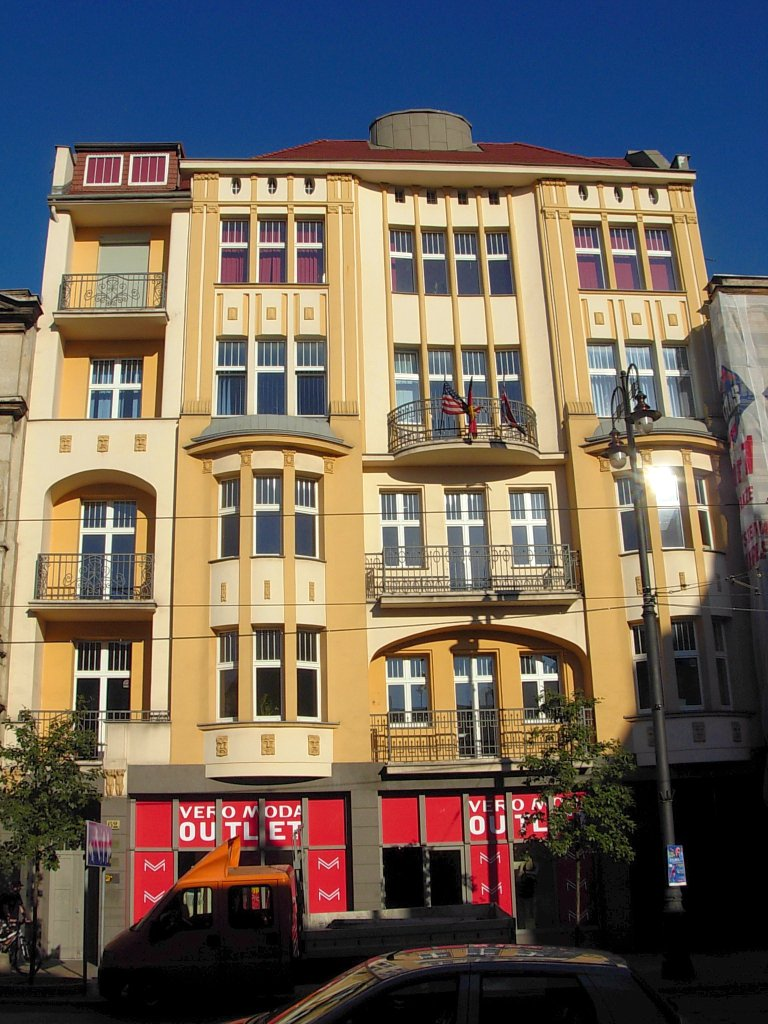
- View from Gdańska Street
- Interactive map of the Alfred Schleusener Tenement area

General information
- Type: Tenement
- Architectural style: Modern architecture
- Location: 62 Gdańska Street, Bydgoszcz, Poland
- Coordinates: 53°7′52″N 18°0′32″E
- Groundbreaking: 1910
- Completed: 1911
- Client: Alfred Schleusener

Technical details
- Floor count: 5

Design and construction
- Architect: Alfred Schleusener

Alfred Schleusener tenement is a tenement located at 62 Gdańska Street in Bydgoszcz.

== Location ==
The building stands on the eastern side of Gdańska street, between Słowackiego street and Adam Mickiewicz Alley. It is adjacent to:

- Carl Meyer tenement at 60;
- Eduard Schulz Tenement at 66/68;

both historical buildings in Bydgoszcz.

== History ==
The edifice has been designed and built by Alfred Schleusener as a house for his own use, which address was then Danzigerstraße 137.

This type of realization (an architect building his own house) is pretty common in Gdańska Street, since other builders did the same at this time:

- Carl Meyer, at 60;
- Carl Rose, at 51;
- Fritz Weidner, at 34;
- Józef Święcicki, at 63.

The building has a distinctive urban character and was erected in 1910-1911. It had a residential wing distinct from the business and trade premises.

In the same area of Bydgoszcz, Alfred Schleusener has also realized :

- Tenement Carl Meinhardt at 27 Gdańska street, in 1909;
- Robert Grundtmann Tenement at 1 Słowackiego street, in 1906.

== Architecture ==
The building has been realized in the style of early, classic modernism.

On the one hand, vertical elevations are highlighted as structural elements of the building by using strings loggias, balconies and bay windows. On the other hand, vertical divisions are highlighted using pilaster and friezes between windows.

== Gallery ==
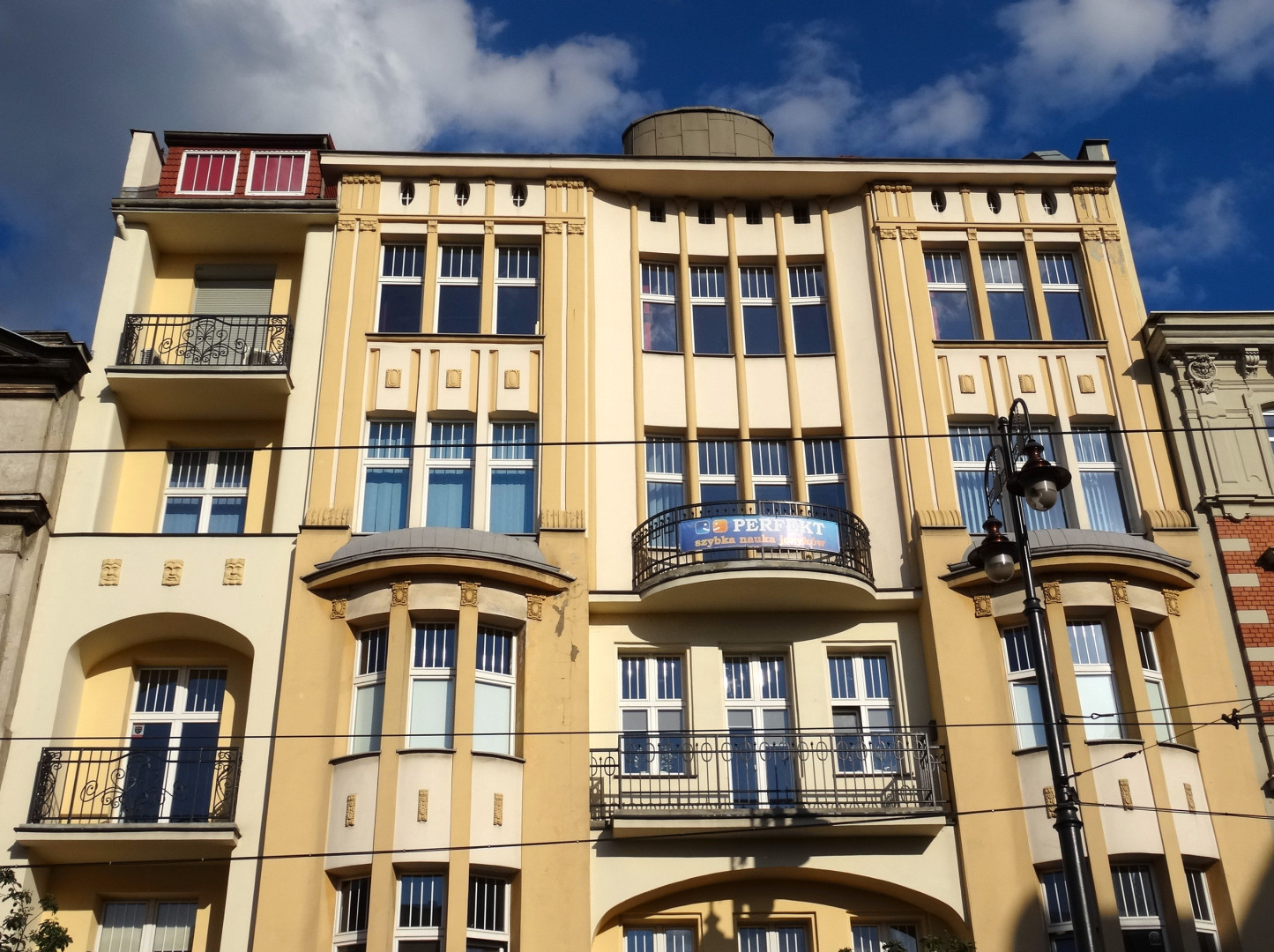
Detailed view of the upper facade

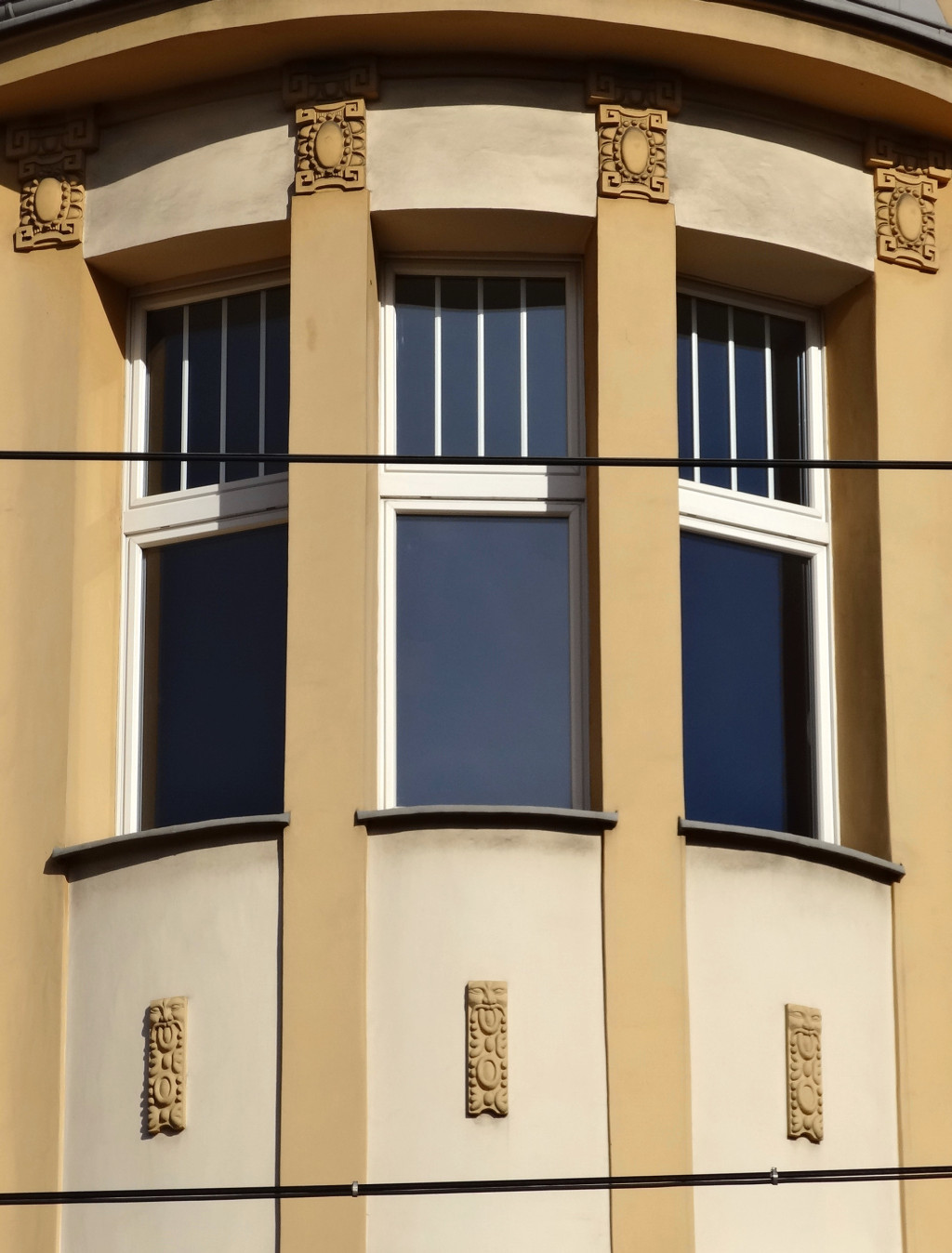
Detail on a bay window

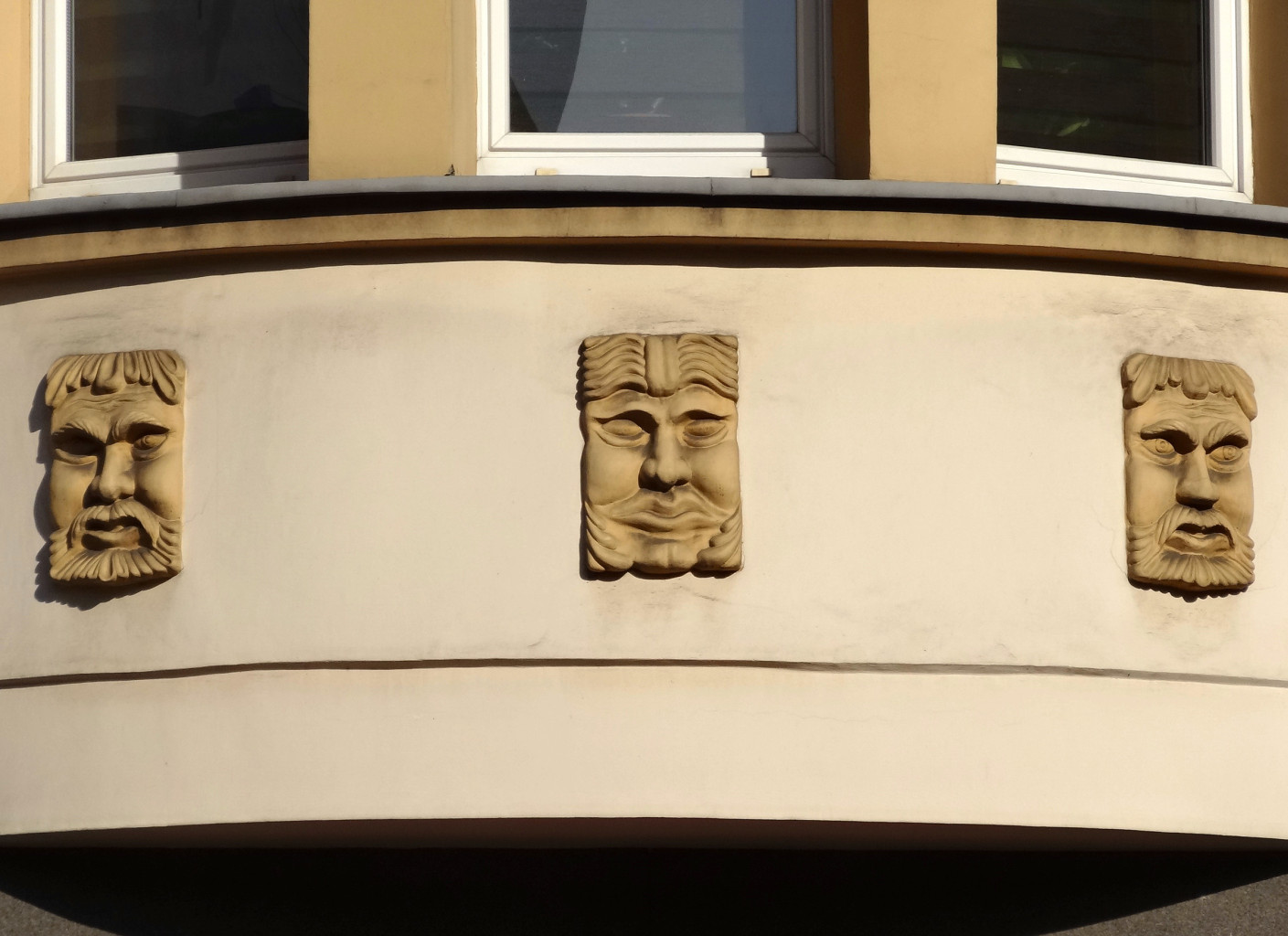
Low-Relief

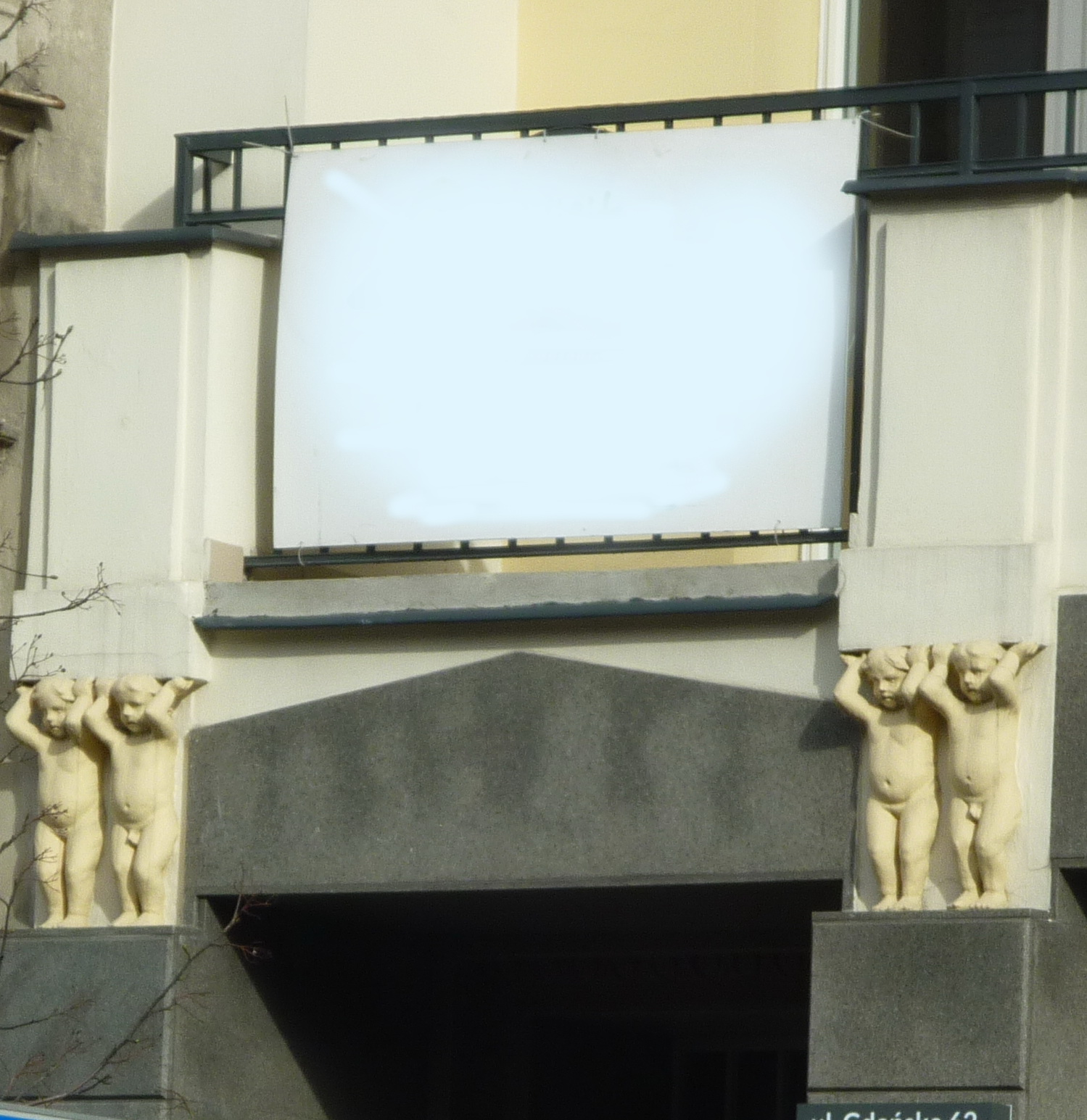
Detail of the gate adornement

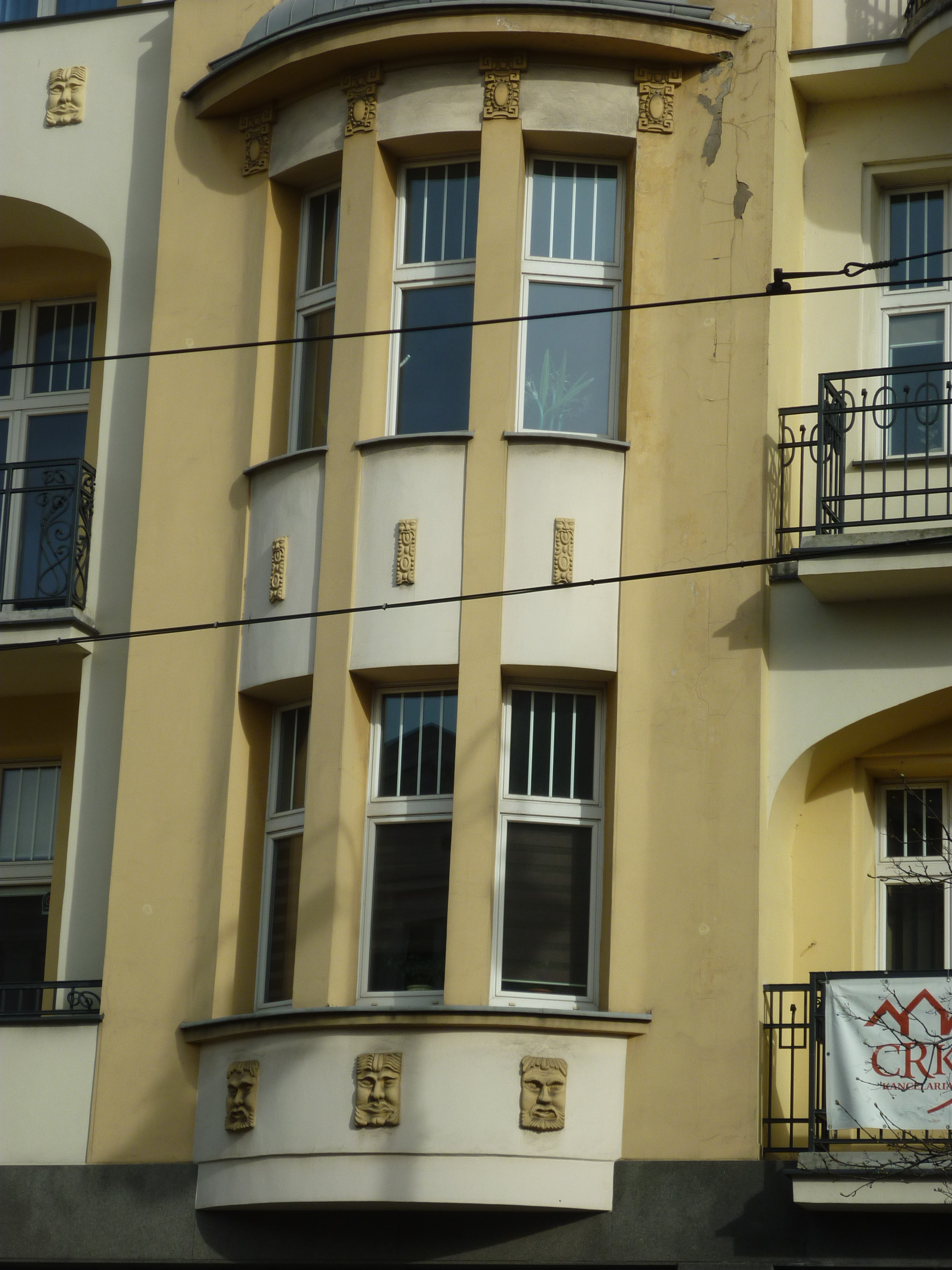
Facade details

== See also ==
- Bydgoszcz
- Gdanska Street in Bydgoszcz
- Alfred Schleusener
- (in Polish) Downtown district in Bydgoszcz

== Bibliography ==
- (in Polish) Bręczewska-Kulesza Daria, Derkowska-Kostkowska Bogna, Wysocka A. (2003). Ulica Gdańska. Przewodnik historyczny. Bydgoszcz: Wojewódzki Ośrodek Kultury w Bydgoszczy. ISBN 9788386970100.
