= Gdańsk Street 67, Bydgoszcz =

Coordinates: 53°7′51″N 18°0′29″E

Tenement at 67 Gdańska street
- Polish: Kamienica przy ul. Gdańskiej 67 w Bydgoszczy
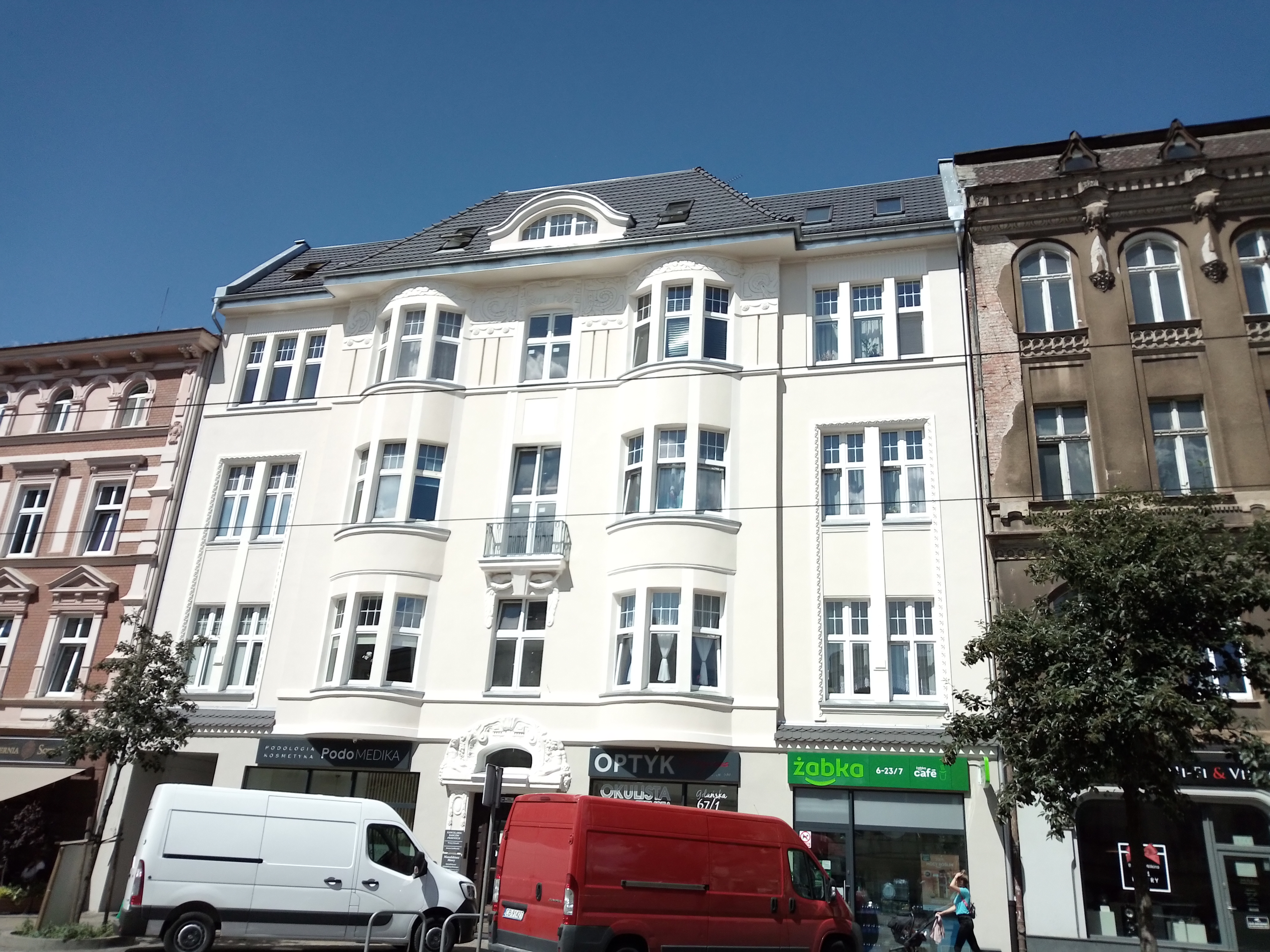
- Tenement from Gdańska Street
- Interactive map of the Tenement at 67 Gdańska street area

General information
- Type: Tenement
- Architectural style: Modern architecture with Art Nouveau elements
- Location: 67 Gdańska Street, Bydgoszcz, Poland
- Groundbreaking: 1910
- Completed: 1911

Technical details
- Floor count: 5

Design and construction
- Architect: Rudolf Kern

Tenement at Gdańska street 67 is a habitation house located at 67 Gdańska Street, in Bydgoszcz. It displays early forms of Modern architecture, with elements of Art Nouveau.

== Location ==
The building stands on the western side of Gdańska Street, between Cieszkowskiego and Świętojańska streets.

It is also close to remarkable historical tenements in the same street:

- Józef Święcicki tenement at 63;
- Eduard Schulz Tenement at 66/68;
- Alfred Schleusener Tenement at 62.

== History ==
The house was built in 1910-1911, on a design by the architect Rudolf Kern, who also erected or redesigned other buildings in Gdańska Street:

- August Mentzel Tenement at 5;
- Tenement at 71 Gdańska street.

Initial address was 40 Danziger Straße, first registered landlord in 1910 was Carl Ernst, a butcher

In 1915, Hermann Boettcher purchased the building. Boettcher was a successful entrepreneur of metalworking initially established in the 1890s in Chodkiewicza Street.

In 1932, at the location of a cafe, Kresowa, Klement Kwaśniewski opened a patisserie and bakery specialized in cakes. Other relatives had their office in the building:

- Marta Kwaśniewska as a photographer;
- Ignacy Kwaśniewski as a businessman.

Today, a pharmacy occupies the ground floor premises and a hotel is located in the backyard of the tenement.

== Architecture ==
The building presents characteristics of the first decade of the 20th century with early forms of Modern architecture and elements of Art Nouveau.

The facade is richly decorated with:

- a portal entrance, with children figure and vegetal forms;
- round bay windows
- peacocks balcony bas-relief;
- friezes surrounding openings;
- third floor windows are enhanced by high quality Art Nouveau vegetal motifs;
- a large eyelid dormer crowns the frontage.

The building has been renovated in 2020.

== Gallery ==
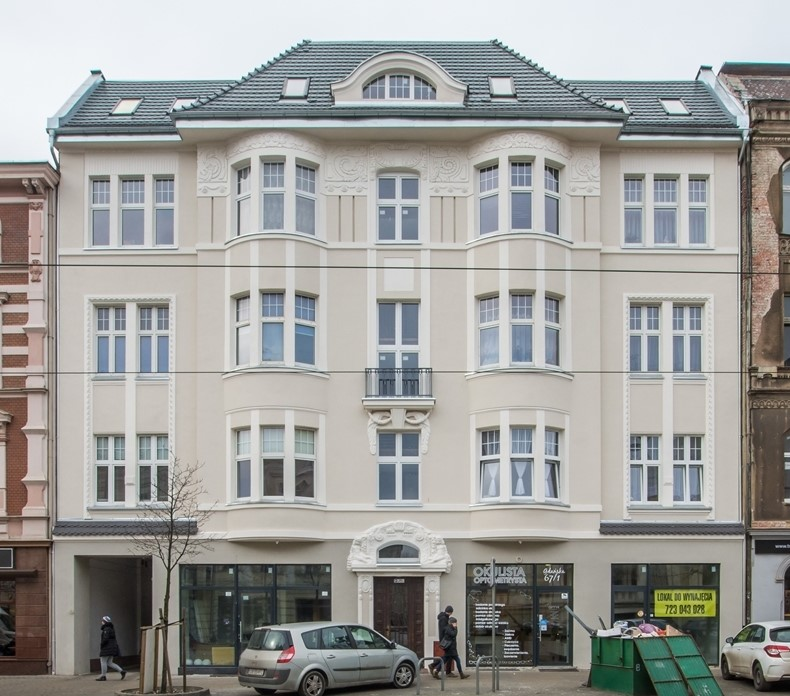
Facade after renovation

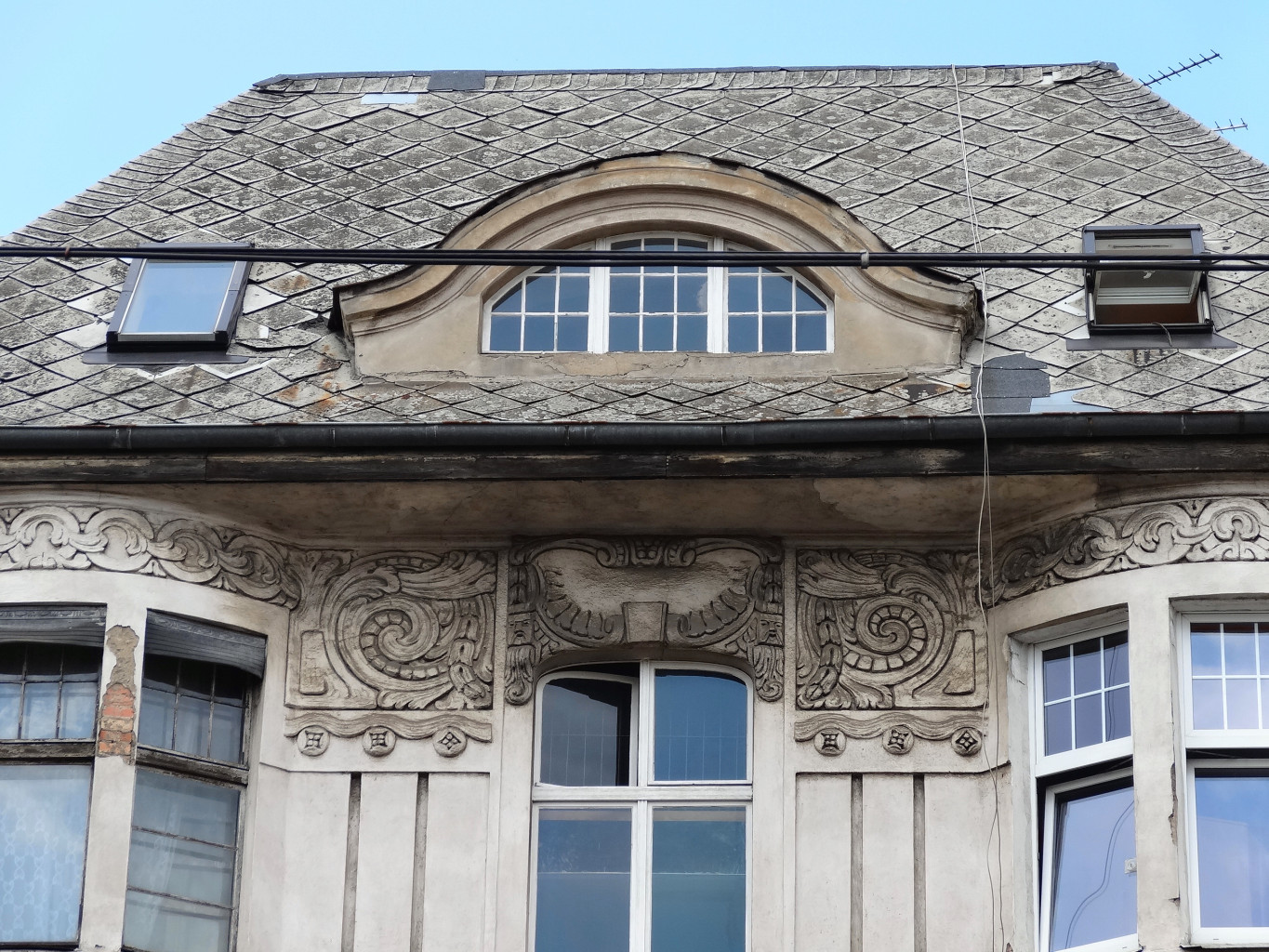
Roof and adornements

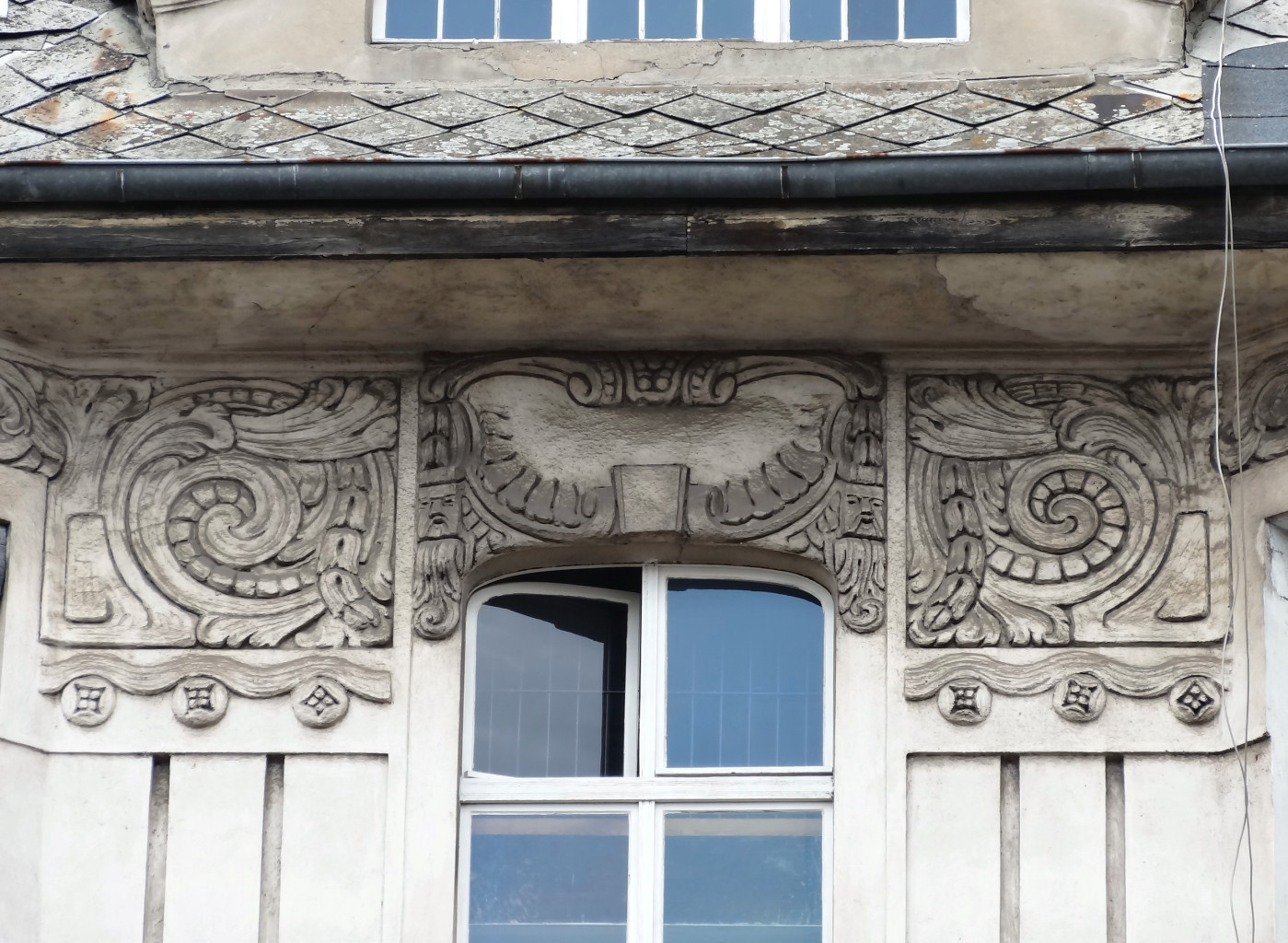
Frieze beneath the roof

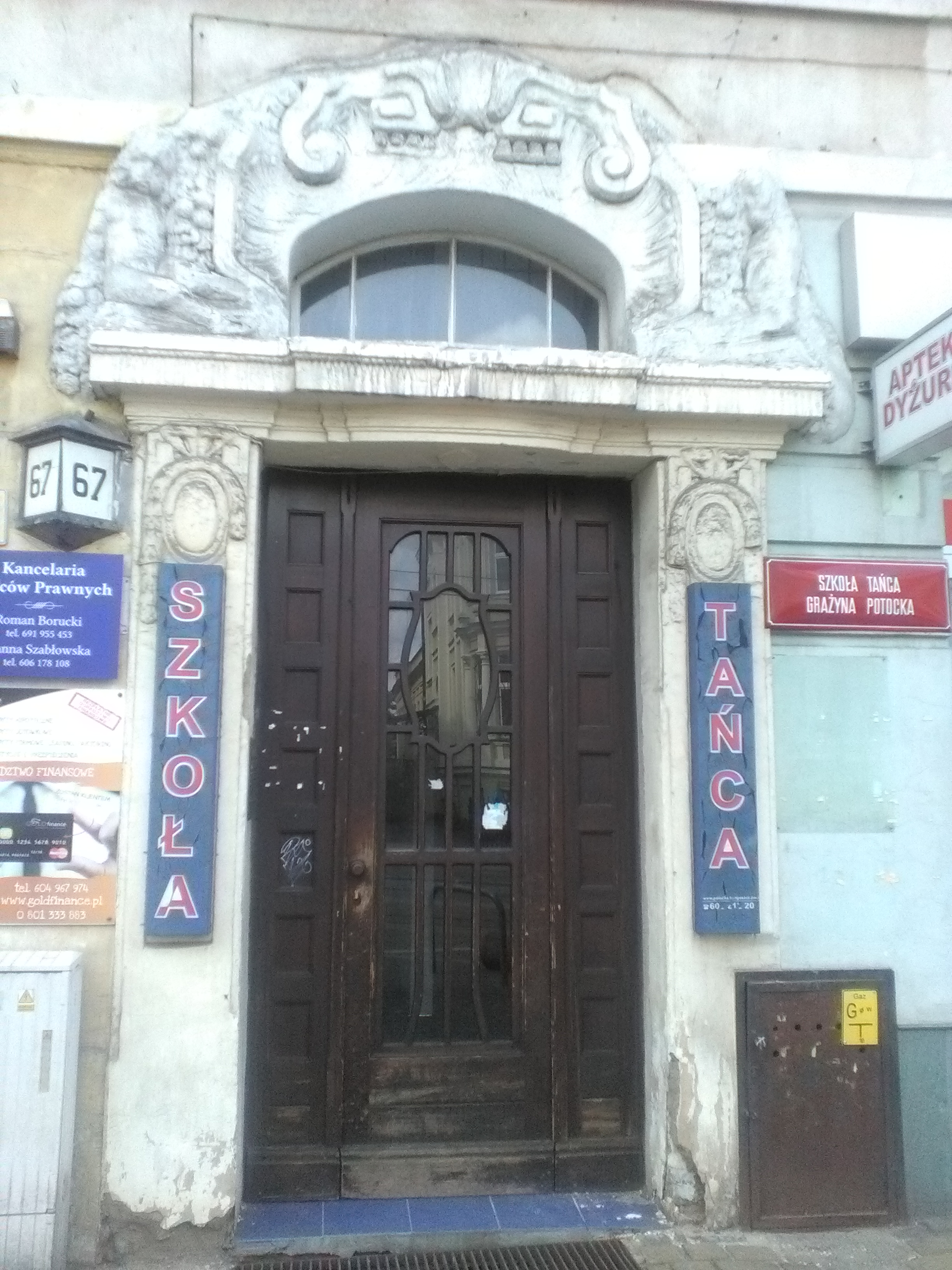
Main portal

== See also ==
- Bydgoszcz
- Gdanska Street in Bydgoszcz
- Rudolf Kern
- (in Polish) Downtown district in Bydgoszcz

== Bibliography ==
- (in Polish) Bręczewska-Kulesza Daria, Derkowska-Kostkowska Bogna, Wysocka A. (2003). Ulica Gdańska. Przewodnik historyczny. Bydgoszcz: Wojewódzki Ośrodek Kultury w Bydgoszczy. ISBN 9788386970100.
