= Robert Grundtmann Tenement =

Robert Grundtmann Tenement in Bydgoszcz
- Polish: Kamienica Roberta Grundtmanna w Bydgoszczy
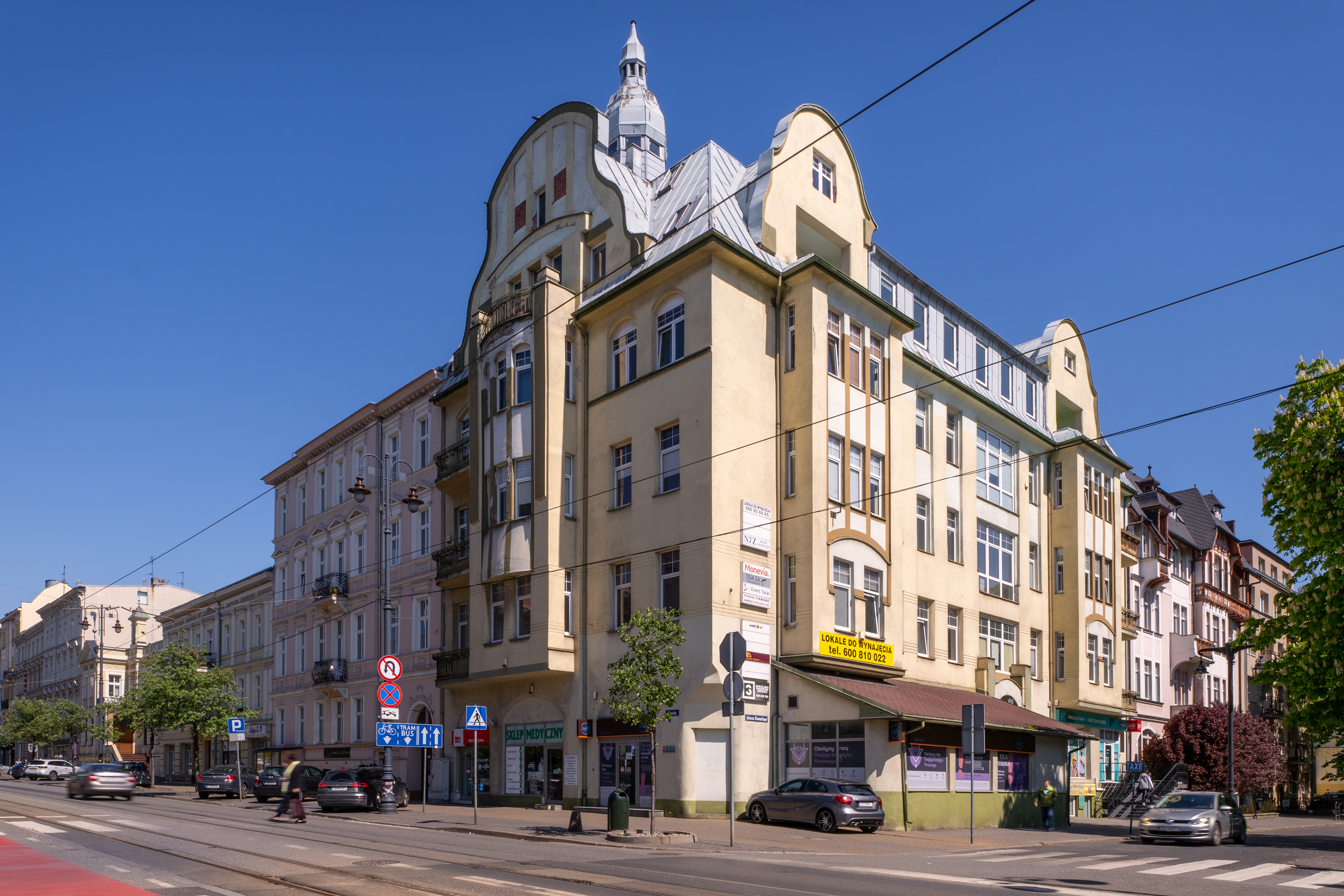
- View from Gdańska street
- Interactive map of the Robert Grundtmann Tenement in Bydgoszcz area

General information
- Type: Tenement
- Architectural style: Modern architecture
- Location: 1 Słowackiego Street, Bydgoszcz, Poland, Poland
- Coordinates: 53°7′49″N 18°0′29″E
- Construction started: 1905
- Completed: 1906
- Client: Robert Grundtmann
- Owner: City of Bydgoszcz

Technical details
- Floor count: 5

Design and construction
- Architect: Alfred Schleusener

Robert Grundtmann Tenement is a building in downtown Bydgoszcz, at 1 Słowackiego Street.

== Location ==
The habitation house stands on eastern side of Gdańska Street at the intersection with Słowackiego street.

== History ==
The house was built in 1905-1906 by architect Alfred Schleusener, for a retired colonel of the Prussian army, Robert Grundtmann. The initial address was 1 Bismarckstraße/137 Danzigerstraße. Alfred Schleusener has been working in Bydgoszcz between 1902 and 1944. Among other realizations, he designed also:

- His own house standing at 62 Gdańska street;
- Tenement Carl Meinhardt standing at 27 Gdańska street.

The building housed one of the most famous Bydgoszcz's cafe: Cafe Metropol then Elite.

From 1909 till the end of WWI, a photographer studio Samson & Co. was active (cf Gallery).

During the interwar period, Paweł Dzionara, a member of the Supreme People's Council, independence activist and city councilor had his office in the building.

During Polish People's Republic, the tenement housed the restaurant SIM.

== Architecture ==
The building is decorated in the style of early modernism, characterized by a desire to simplify and find geometrical forms of elevation. The building has a massive body, with simple details and axial composition components. The metal roof is highlighted by a ridge turret.

Inside, there is an original elevator dating back from the time of construction, with a wrought iron decoration in Art Nouveau style.

== Gallery ==
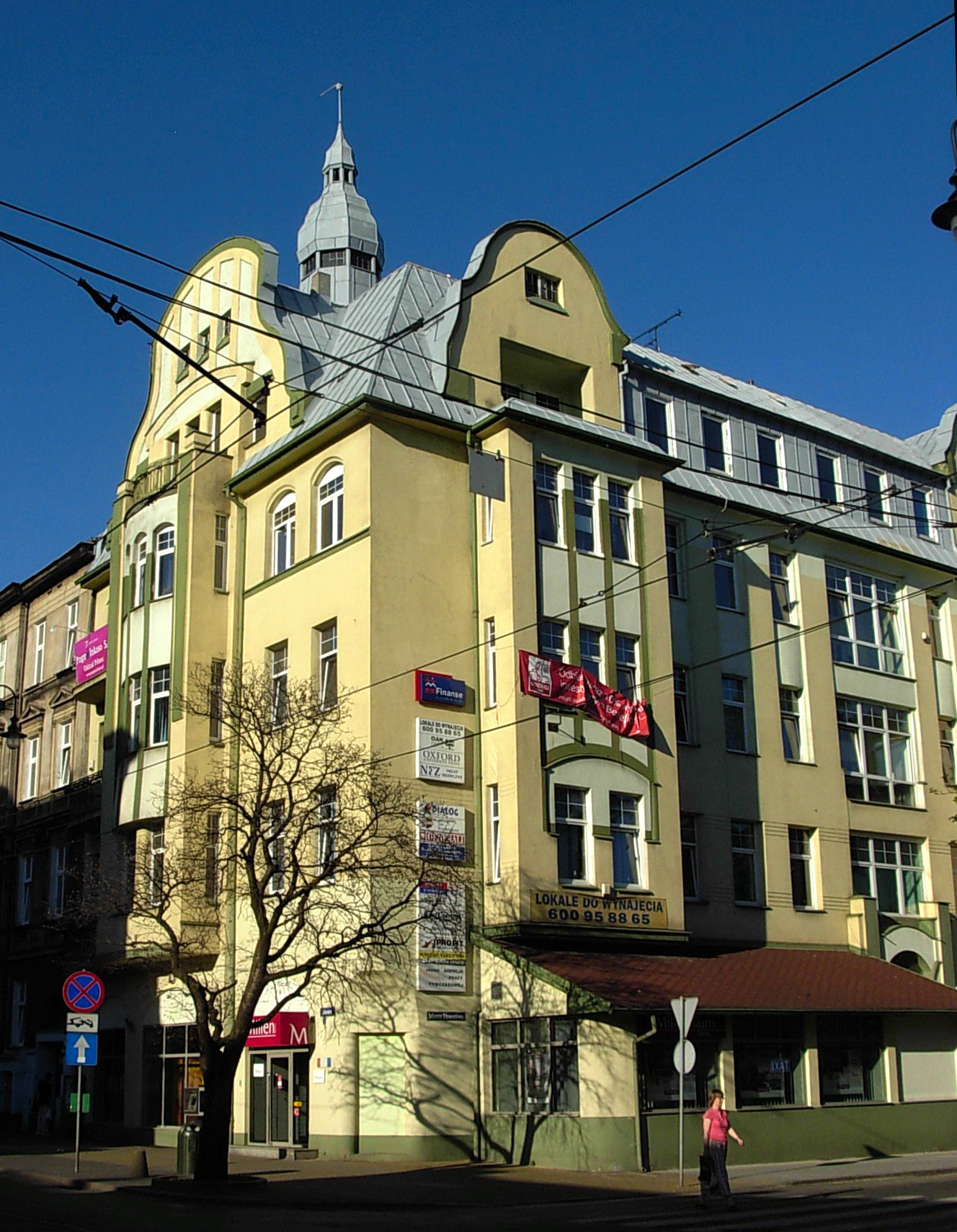
View of the building corner

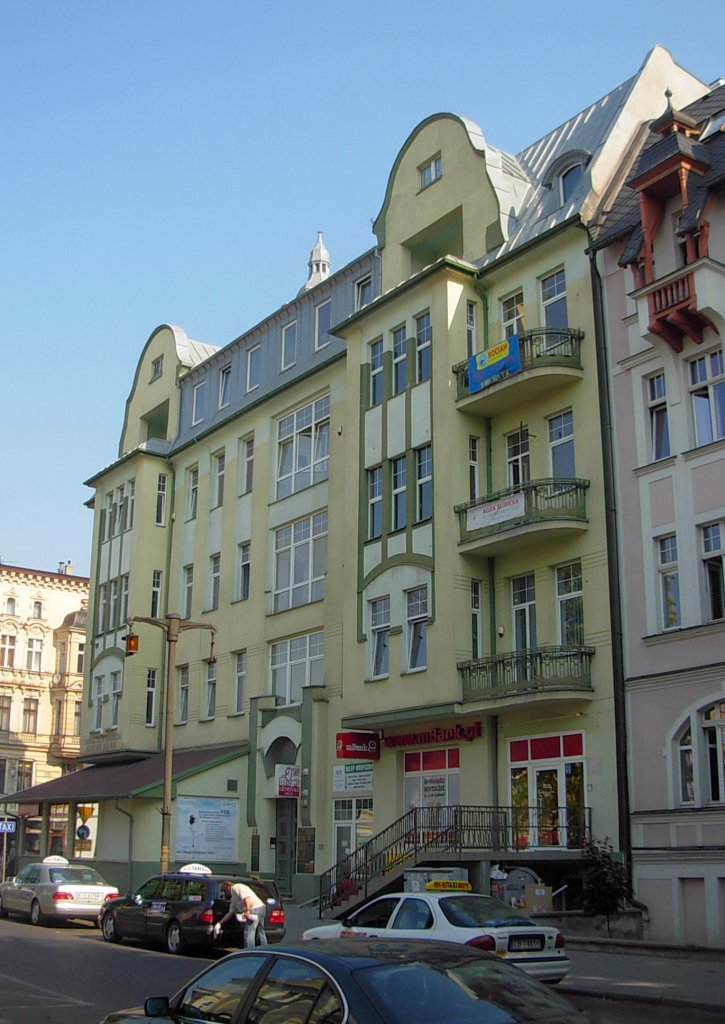
View from Słowacki street

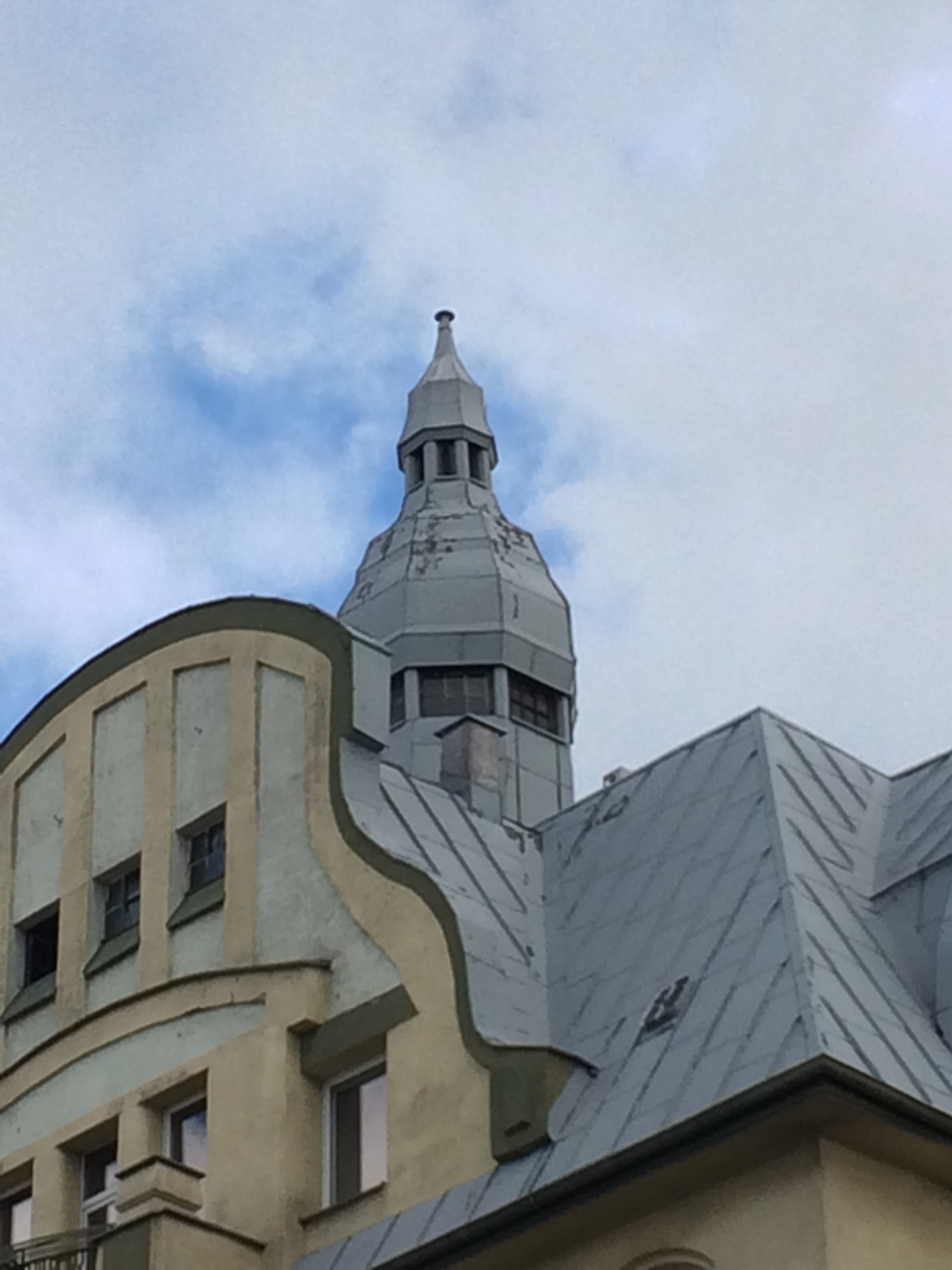
Detail of the ridge turret

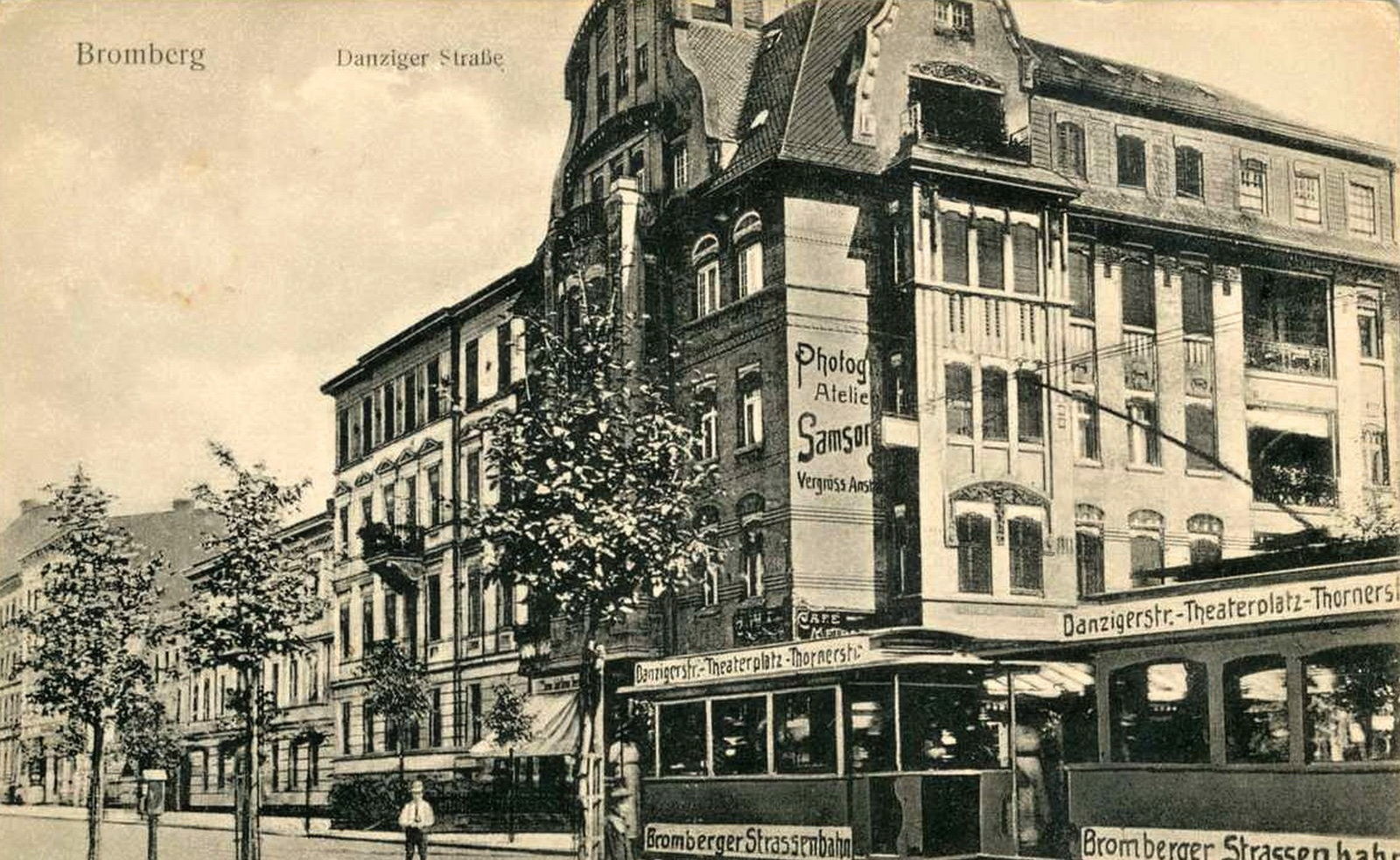
Tenement in 1907 - Notice the Advertising for photographer studio "Samson & Co."

== See also ==
- Bydgoszcz
- Gdanska Street in Bydgoszcz
- Słowackiego Street in Bydgoszcz
- Alfred Schleusener
- (in Polish) Downtown district in Bydgoszcz

== Bibliography ==
- (in Polish) Bręczewska-Kulesza Daria, Derkowska-Kostkowska Bogna, Wysocka A. (2003). Ulica Gdańska. Przewodnik historyczny. Bydgoszcz: Wojewódzki Ośrodek Kultury w Bydgoszczy. ISBN 9788386970100.
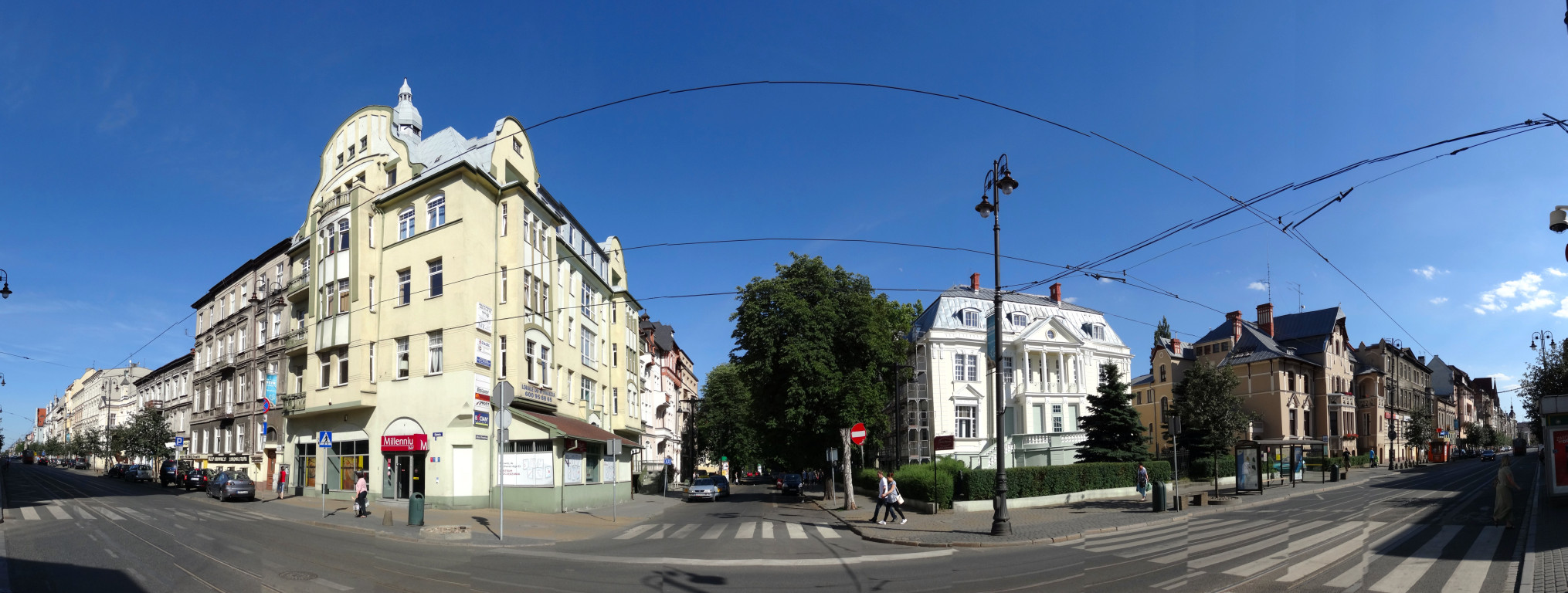
Panorama of Gdańska street in the vicinity of Robert Grundtmann Tenement (left side)
