= Carl Rose Tenement =

Carl Rose Tenement in Bydgoszcz
- Polish: Kamienica Carla Rose w Bydgoszczy
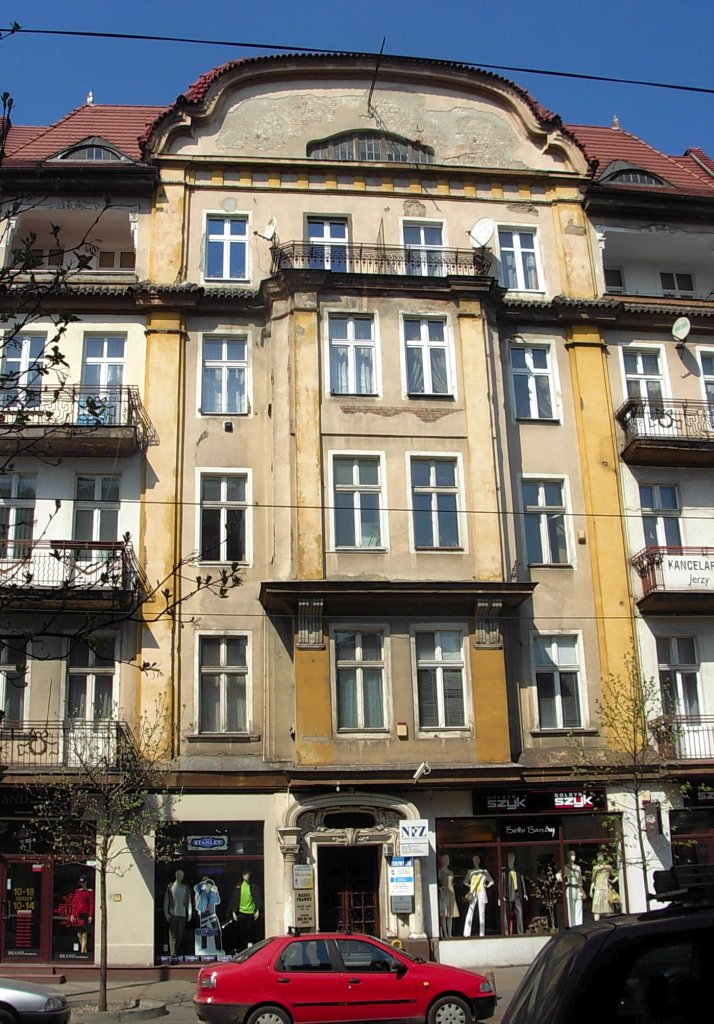
- View from Gdańska street
- Interactive map of the Carl Rose Tenement in Bydgoszcz area

General information
- Type: Tenement
- Architectural style: Eclecticism & elements from Art Nouveau
- Location: 51 Gdańska street, Bydgoszcz, Poland, Poland
- Coordinates: 53°7′46″N 18°0′24″E
- Construction started: 1903
- Completed: 1904
- Client: Carl Rose

Technical details
- Floor count: 5

Design and construction
- Architect: Carl Rose

The Carl Rose Tenement is a historical building in downtown Bydgoszcz.

== Location ==
The tenement stands on the western side of Gdańska Street at Nr.51, between Śniadeckich and Cieszkowskiego streets.

== History ==
The edifice has been built in 1903–1904, according to the project owner, architect Carl Rose. Its initial address was 29 Danzigerstaße. Carl Rose was born on December 11, 1864, in Barth, Germany. He has attended high school in Stralsund. In 1882, he began apprenticeship in Bromberg in the company of Albert Rose his uncle, a master mason in the city since 1866. For further education he traveled to Denmark, Sweden and Norway. Later, he worked as a construction manager in the construction of government buildings in Berlin.

In September 1890, Rose returned to Bydgoszcz to take over the company his defunct uncle. He took part to the construction of the house in the courtyard of Emil Bernhardt tenement in Bydgoszcz. Professionally, he was active in Bromberg at least until 1920. As of 7 June 1898, he belonged to the masonic lodge "Janus" in Bydgoszcz.

=== Interwar period ===
After World War I, the tenement was the property of Roman Lisiecki from Żnin. In the building in July 1926, next to cafe "Kawiarni Wiejskiej" opened an "Orbis" agency, which sold train tickets home and abroad. Both the Cafe and the agency were run by two women displaced from the Eastern Borderlands at the end of WWI, Janina Zabłocka and her friend Kicińska.

Also in 1926, Zygmunt Grabowski from Warsaw opened "Zygmunt", a barber salon and a shop selling perfumes and cosmetics.

== Architecture ==
The facade, though worn out by time, display several details, related to Art Nouveau style. The portal is flanked by columns that joins above a transom light adorned with vegetal motifs. The main wooden door is intertwined with a delicate wrought-iron lace. Overhanging the portal, a large bay window towering through three levels ends up with a terrace. On both side, on can notice wrought-iron balconies, bearing different motifs, crowned at the hird floor by loggias. The top gable of the elevation is curved, enhanced on each side by eyelid dormers.

== Gallery ==
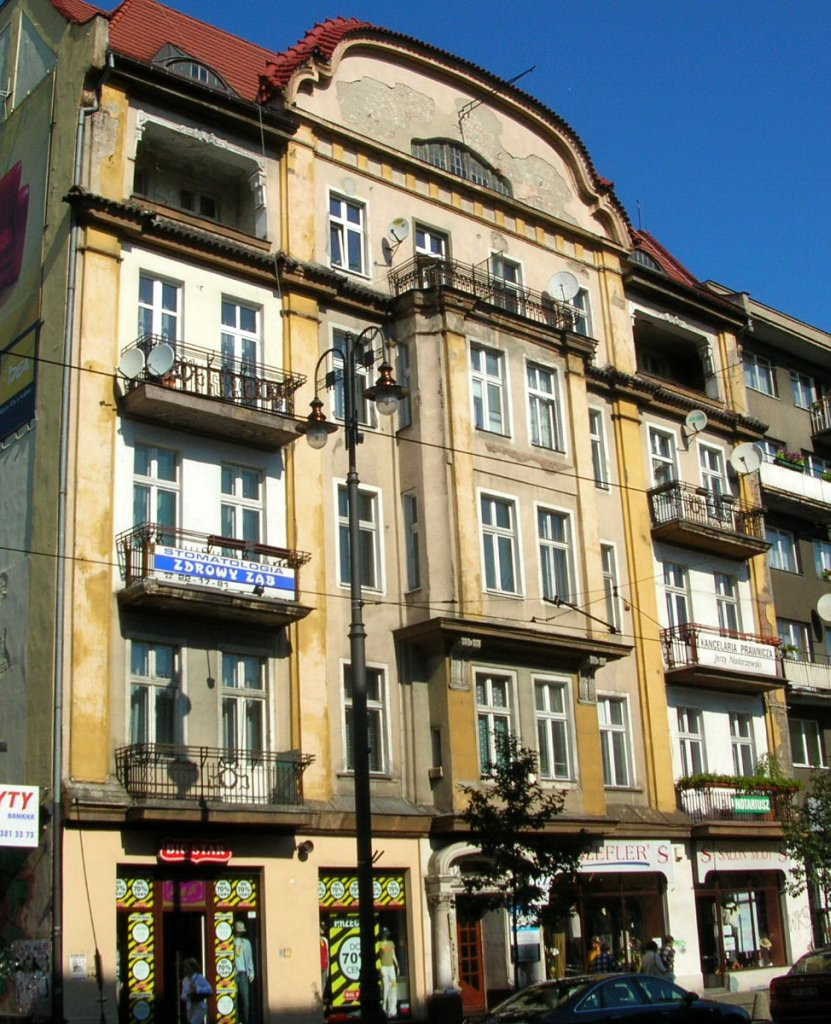
Main elevation from Gdańska street

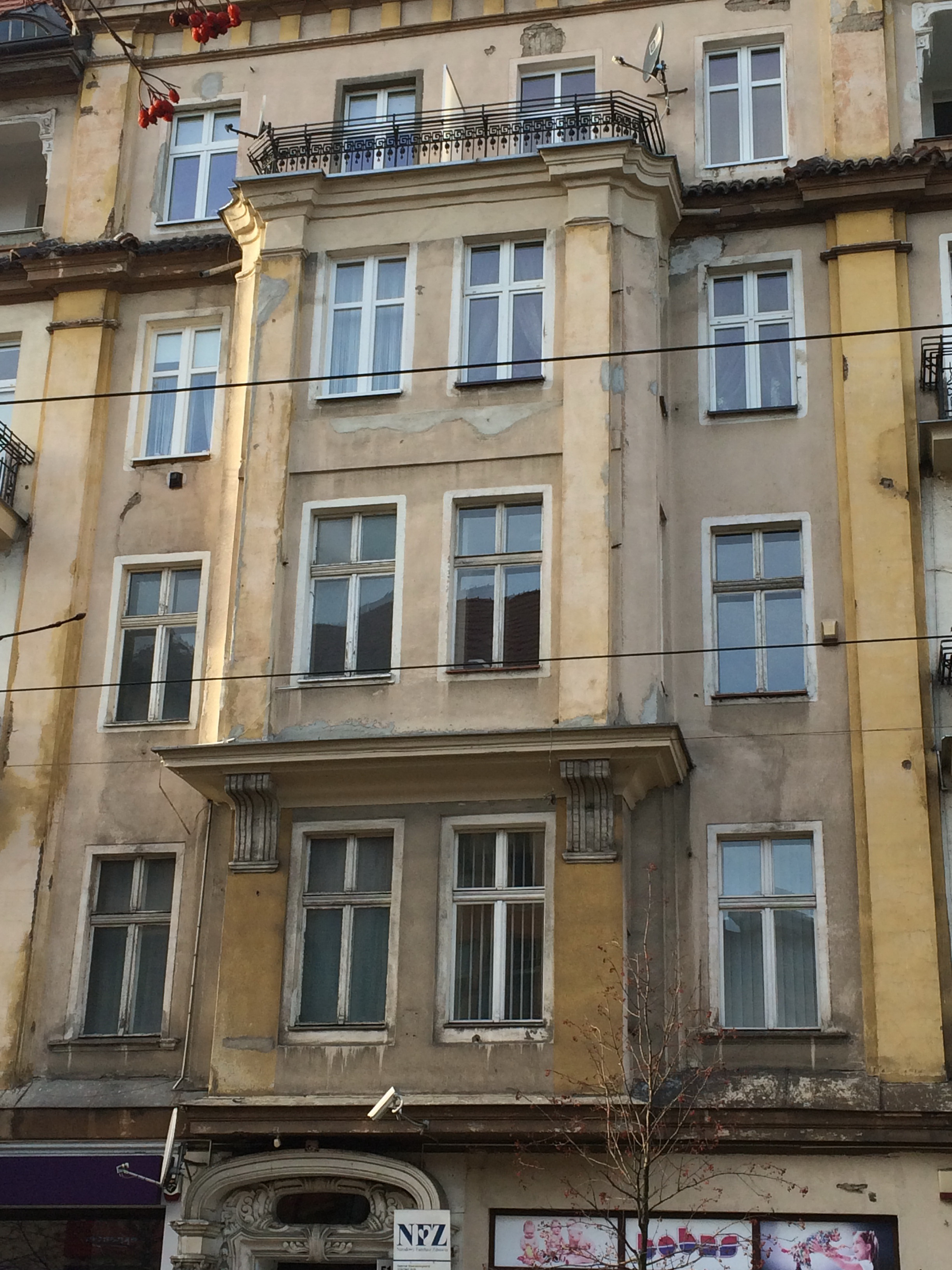
Detail of the bay-window

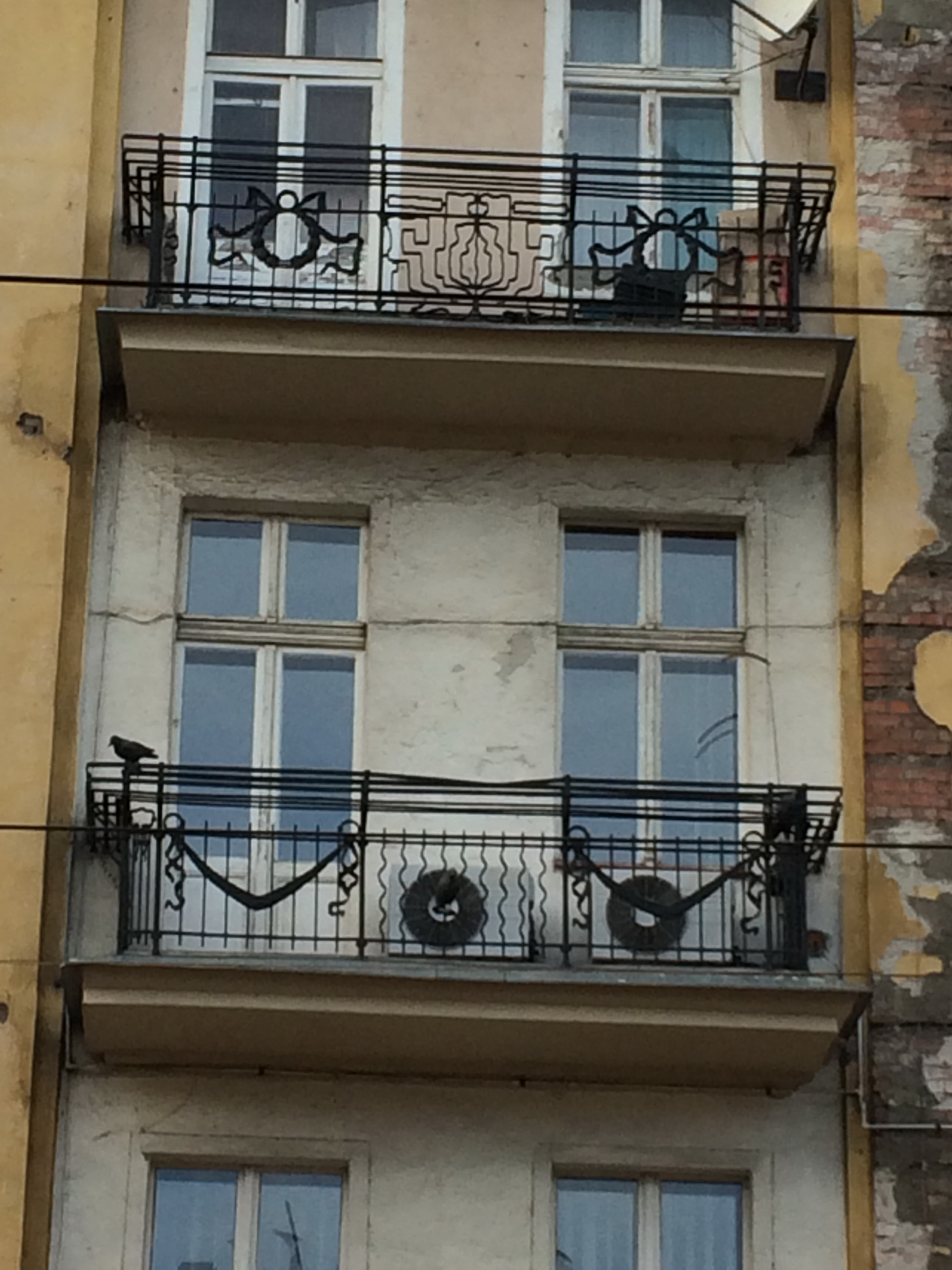
Wrought-iron balconies

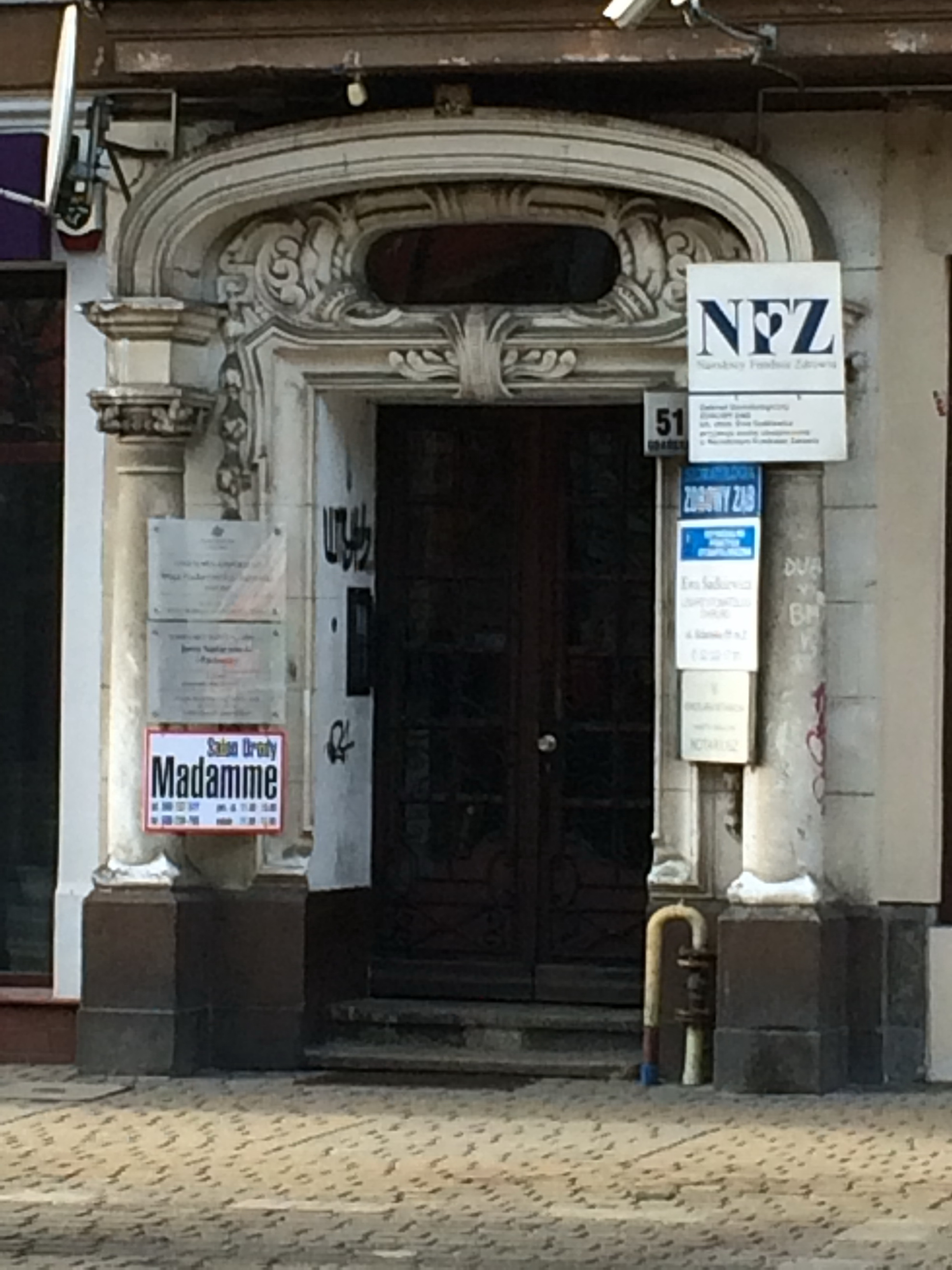
Art Nouveau Portal

== See also ==
- Bydgoszcz
- Carl Rose
- Gdanska Street in Bydgoszcz
- (in Polish) Downtown district in Bydgoszcz

== Bibliography ==
- (in Polish) Bręczewska-Kulesza Daria, Derkowska-Kostkowska Bogna, Wysocka A. (2003). Ulica Gdańska. Przewodnik historyczny. Bydgoszcz: Wojewódzki Ośrodek Kultury w Bydgoszczy. ISBN 9788386970100.
