= Carl Meinhardt Tenement =

Tenement Carl Meinhardt
- Polish: Kamienica Carla Meinhardta w Bydgoszczy
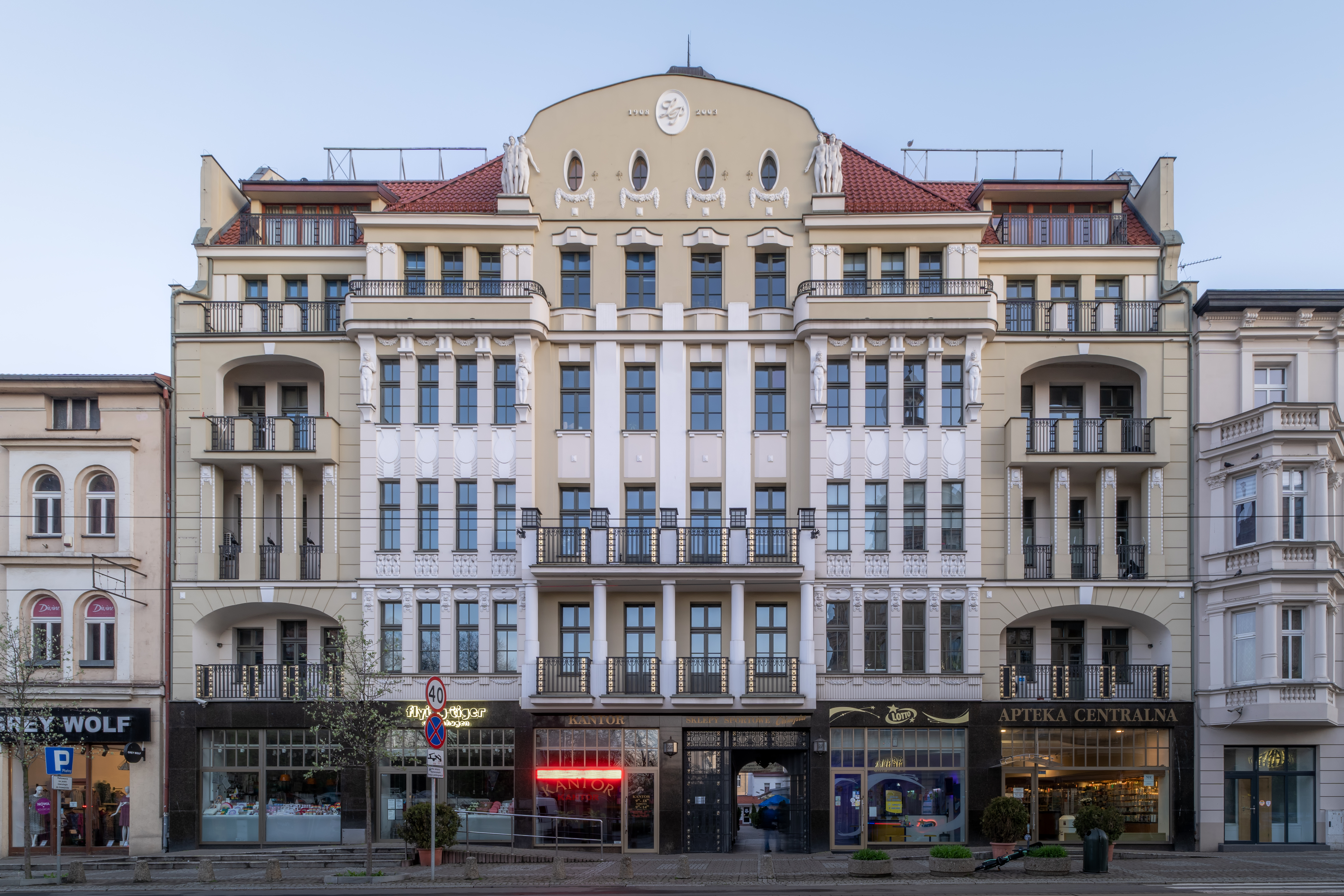
- View from Plac Wolności
- Interactive map of the Tenement Carl Meinhardt area

General information
- Type: Tenement
- Architectural style: Modern architecture
- Location: Bydgoszcz, 27 Gdańska Street, Bydgoszcz, Poland, Poland
- Coordinates: 53°7′38″N 18°0′16″E
- Construction started: 1908
- Completed: 1909
- Landlord: Carl Meinhardt

Technical details
- Floor count: 6

Design and construction
- Architect: Alfred Schleusener

Tenement Carl Meinhardt is a building located at 27 Gdańska Street, in Bydgoszcz, Poland.

== Location ==
The building stands on the western side of Gdańska Street, opposite the Plac Wolności.

== History ==
The house was built between 1908 and 1909 for a restaurateur, Carl Meinhardt. Previously on this site, stood the villa of Georg Minde-Pouet (1871-1950), first director of the Provincial and Municipal Public Library in Bydgoszcz. Minde-Pouet lived two years there (1904-1906).

The building was designed by Bydgoszcz architect Alfred Schleusener. It stands out as one of the most typical houses of urban character of its age.

In the 1910s, it housed on the ground floor the office and workshop of Carl August Franke, a chemist and owner of the factory on Mill Island. The building displayed initially a highly decorated façade as well as interiors. On 19 January 1934, a statue adorning the summit (20m high) of the façade fell and killed two people. As a consequence, city authorities decided to remove from the building all outside decorations, figures and cornices which were considered as "unnecessary".

During the interwar period, the building belonged to Jan Ostrowski, a co-owner of Behring shoe factory. Since the 1920s, the pharmacy Central is standing on the ground floor. Jakub Hechliński, a local furniture designer, worked entirely on its original decor. During this time, the building housed the medical facility of Dr. Szymanski, including baths, massage facilities and gymnasium. Later on, in the 1930s, the company Sanitas used the premises to offer ordinary baths, therapeutics and hydrotherapy.

The building also housed Tint, a dye workshop run by the family Kłamajski.

In the 1940s, the tenement house was rebuilt according to original designs of Alfred Schleusener, and after World War II it went through renovation until 1974, when happened the official visit to the city of Edward Gierek, the 1st secretary of the Central Committee of the Polish United Workers' Party. For this occasion, all the sculptures and decorations were removed from the façade.

In 2003, the building was completely renovated, restoring the frontage with stucco decoration. Once the renovation completed, the editors of the Bydgoszcz branch of "Gazeta Wyborcza", which has its headquarters in the building, organized the first "Feast of Gdańska Street" (Polish: Święto Ulicy Gdańskiej).

== Architecture ==
The building was designed in the style of early Modern architecture. The footprint is horseshoe shaped, with the main façade giving onto Gdańska Street. Since the 2003 renovation, the stucco decorations are back, including:

- Life size figures of angels on the upper part of the gable;
- Naked figures;
- Gargoyles;
- Monkey sculptures;
- Balconies embellished by restored wrought handrails.

Interiors still held their preserved historic elevator and fragments of original stuccoes. The pharmacy "Central" still retains its historic pharmaceutical instruments, including weights, glass eye bath, bottle opener and mortar.

== Gallery ==
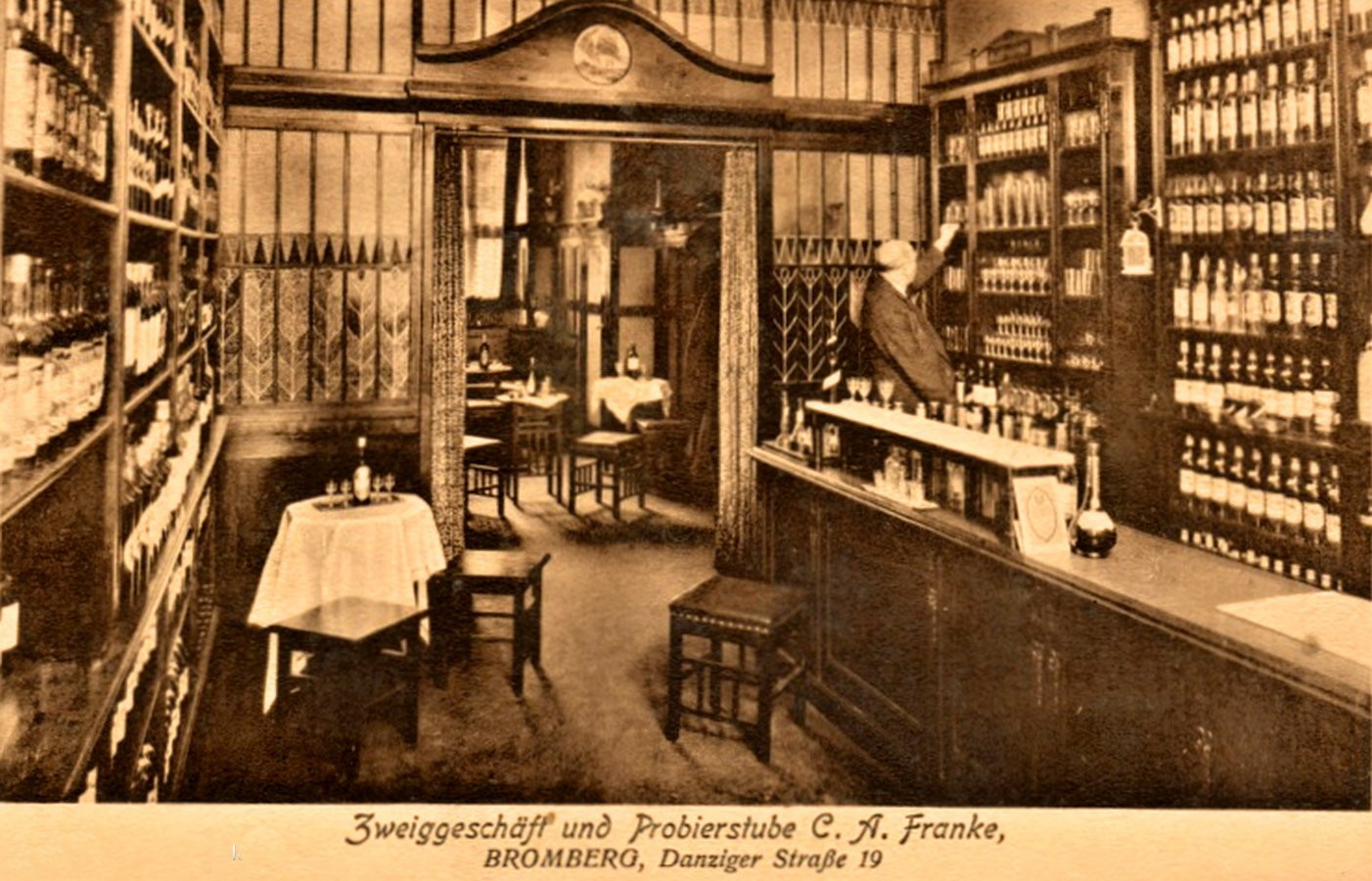
The office of Carl August Franke in 1914

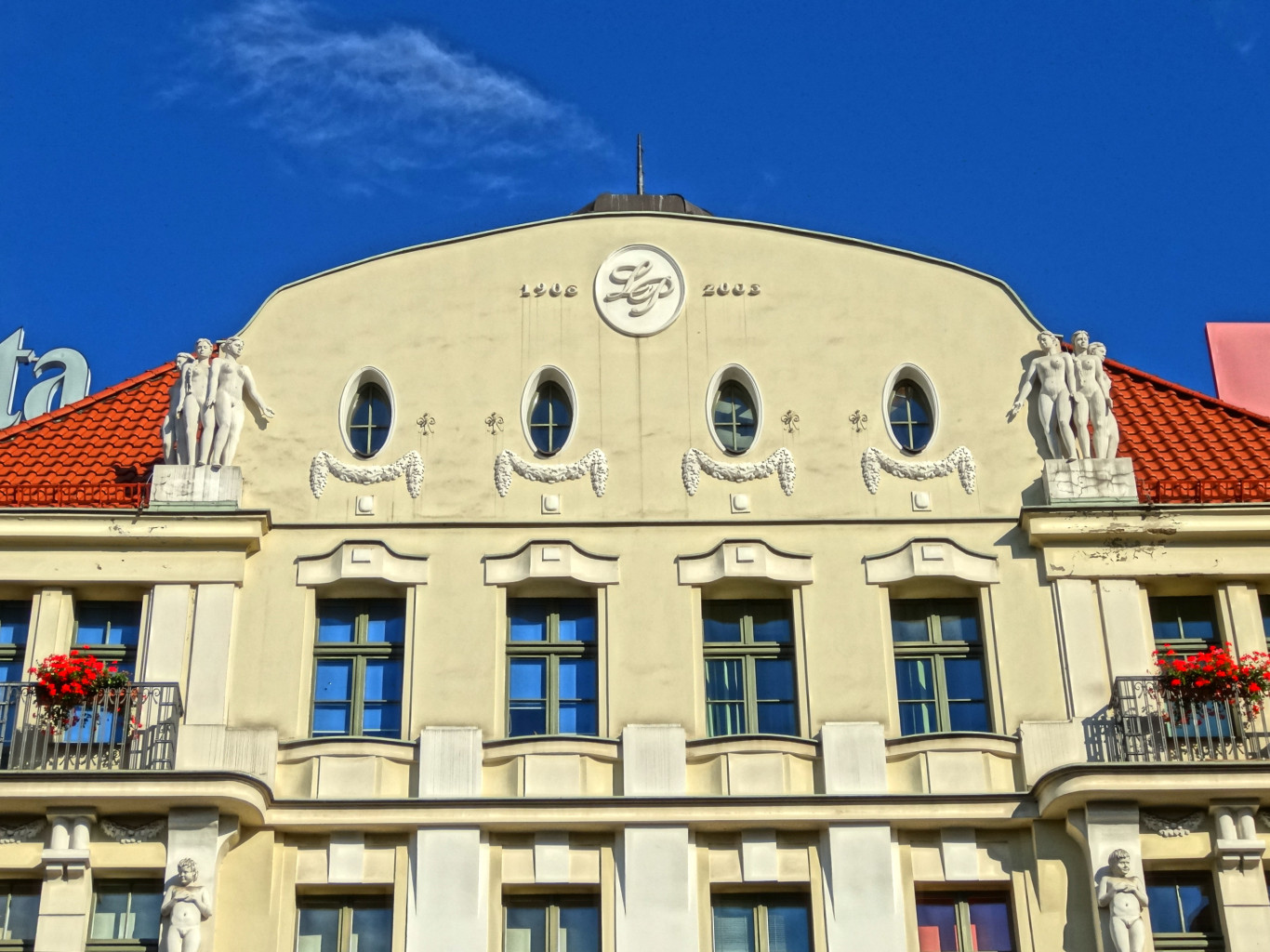
Facade gable

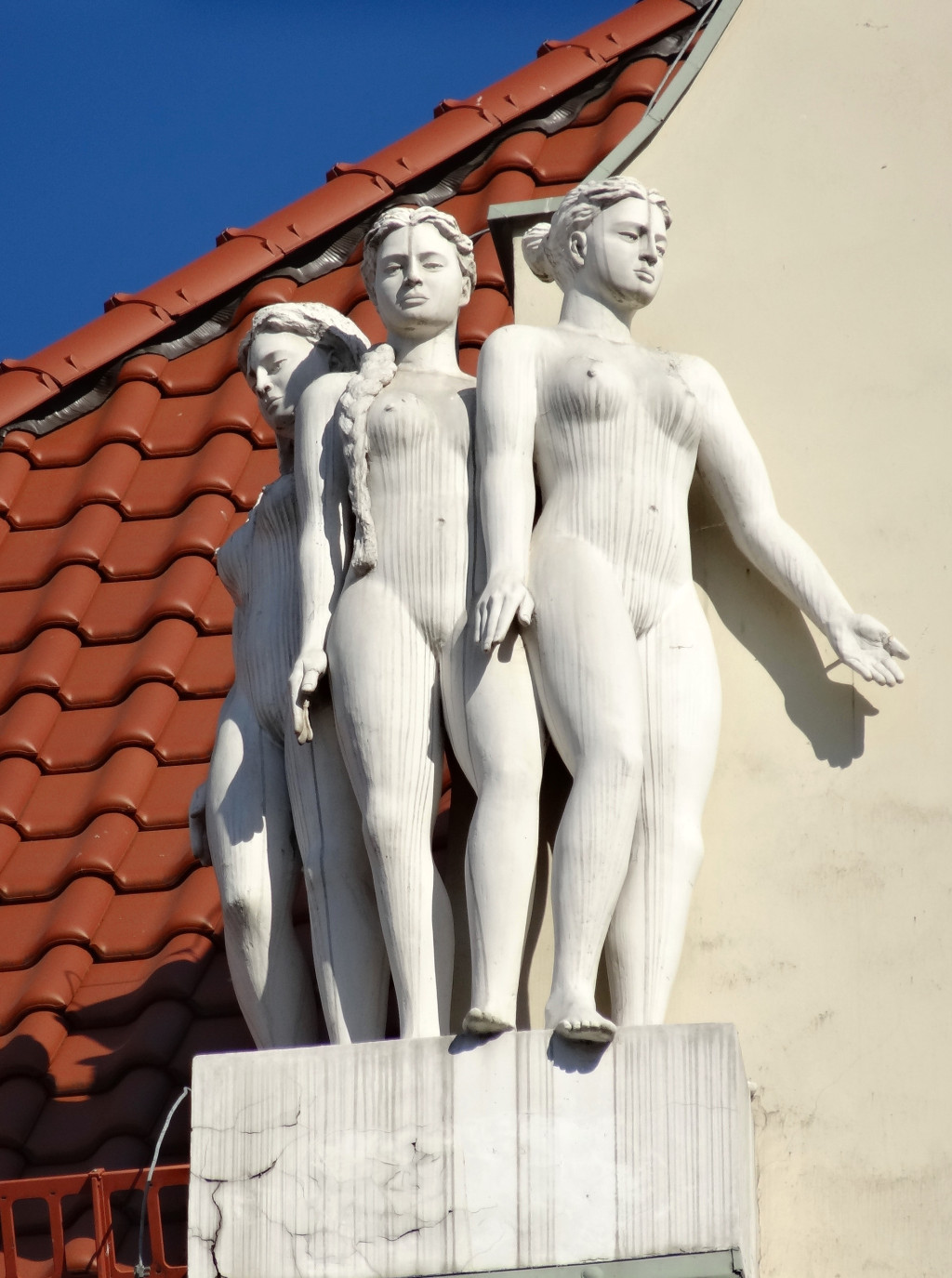
Allegorical sculptures

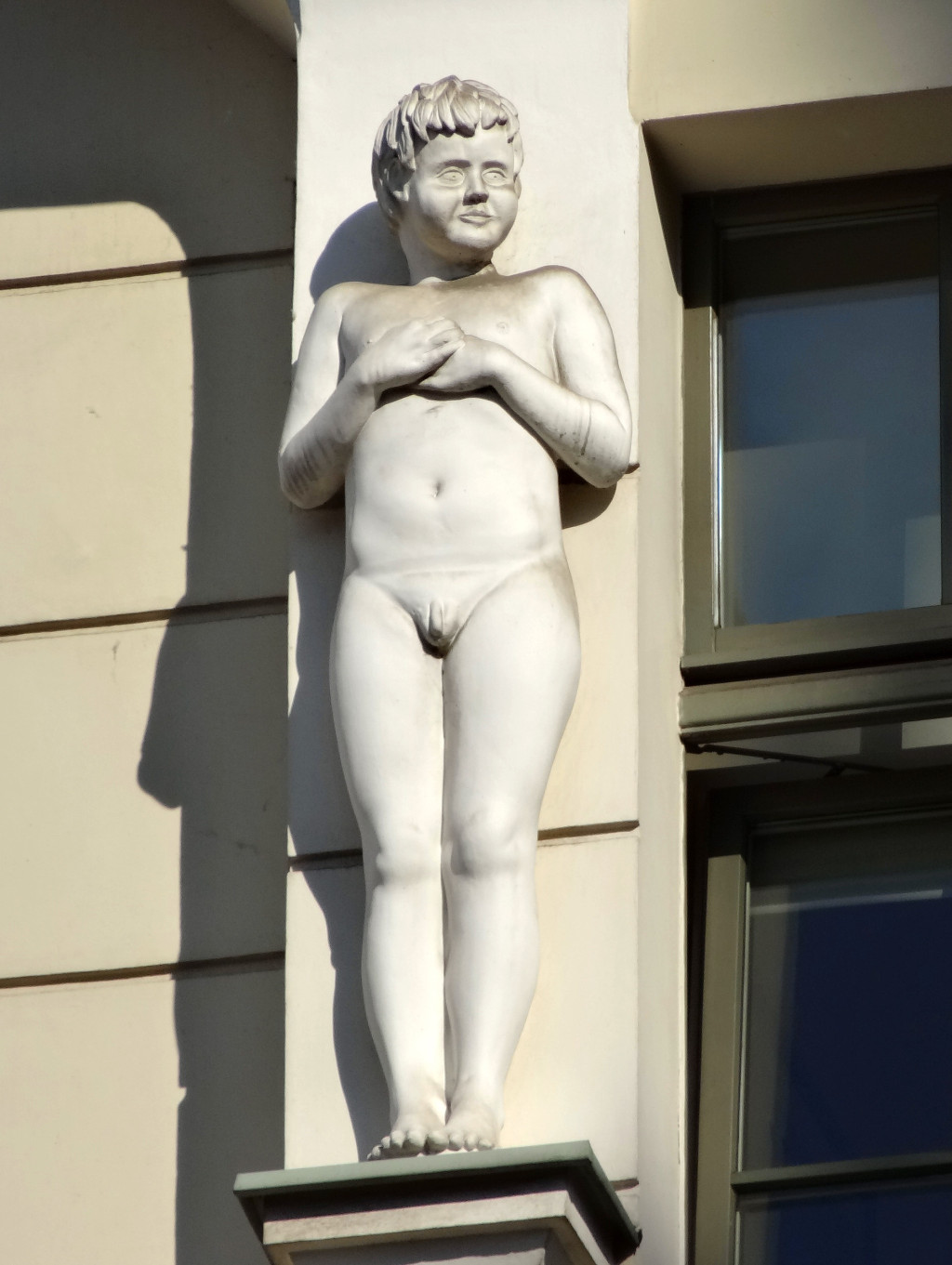
Young Man

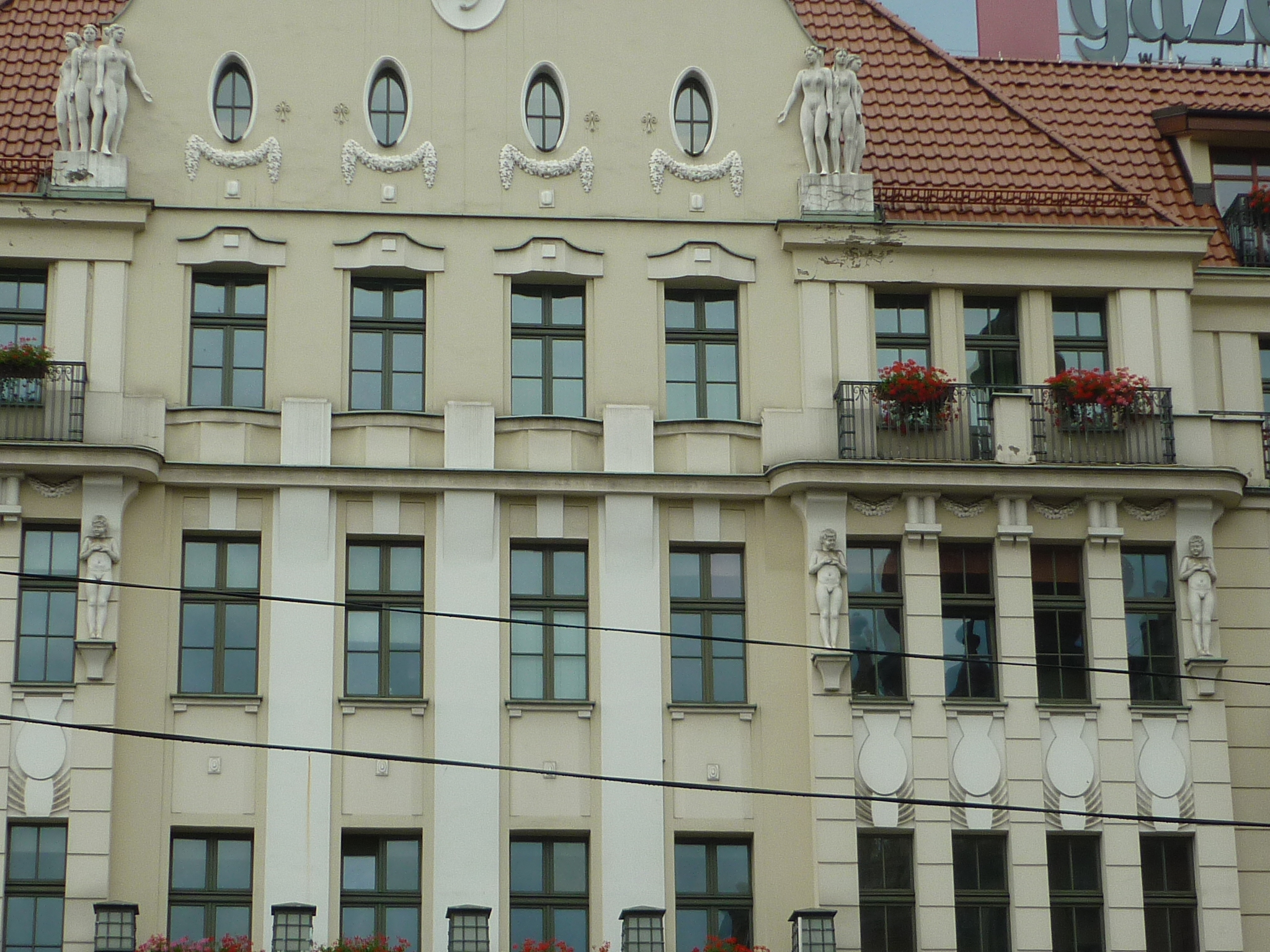
General view of Carl Meinhardt building facade

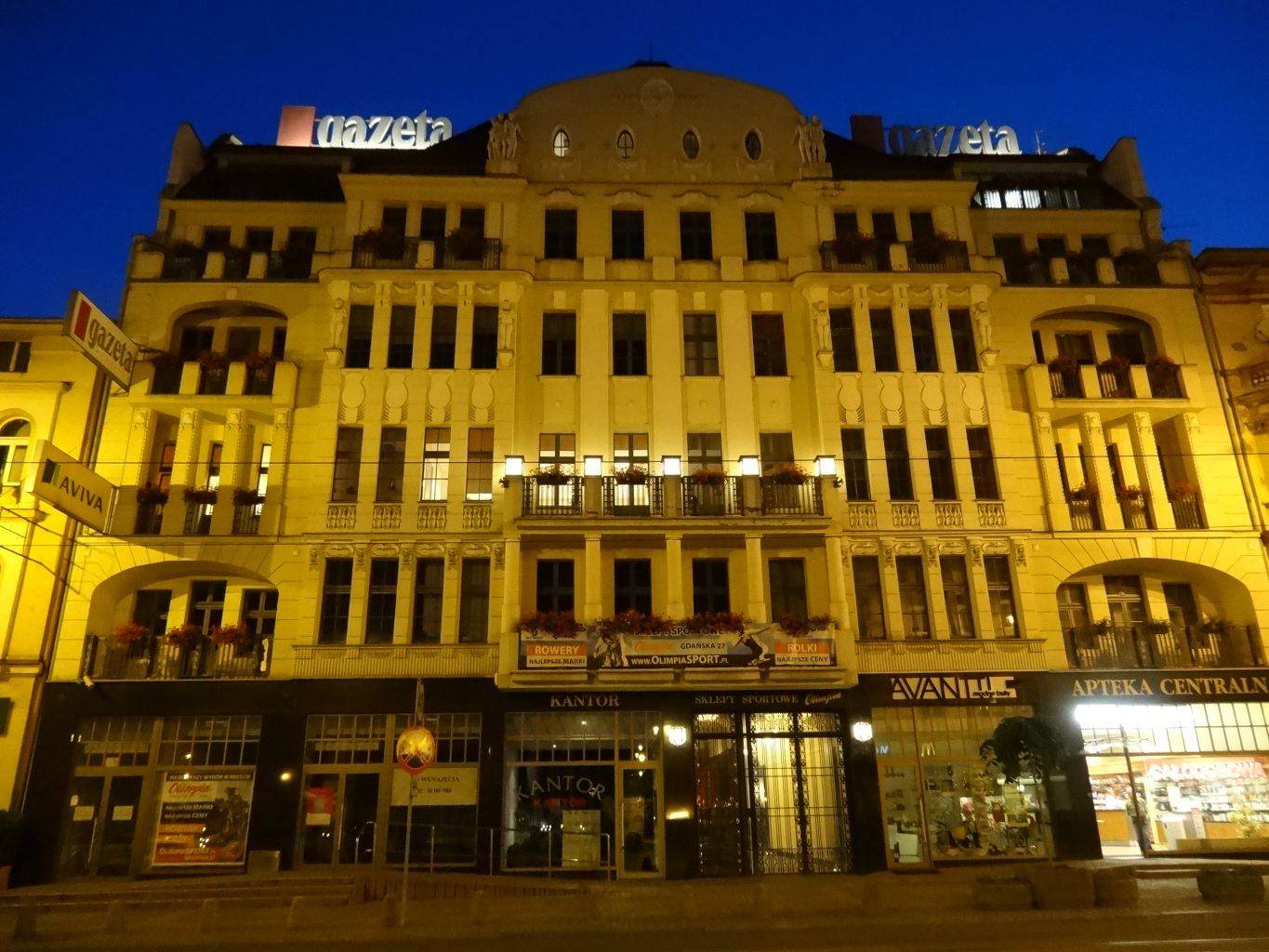
By night

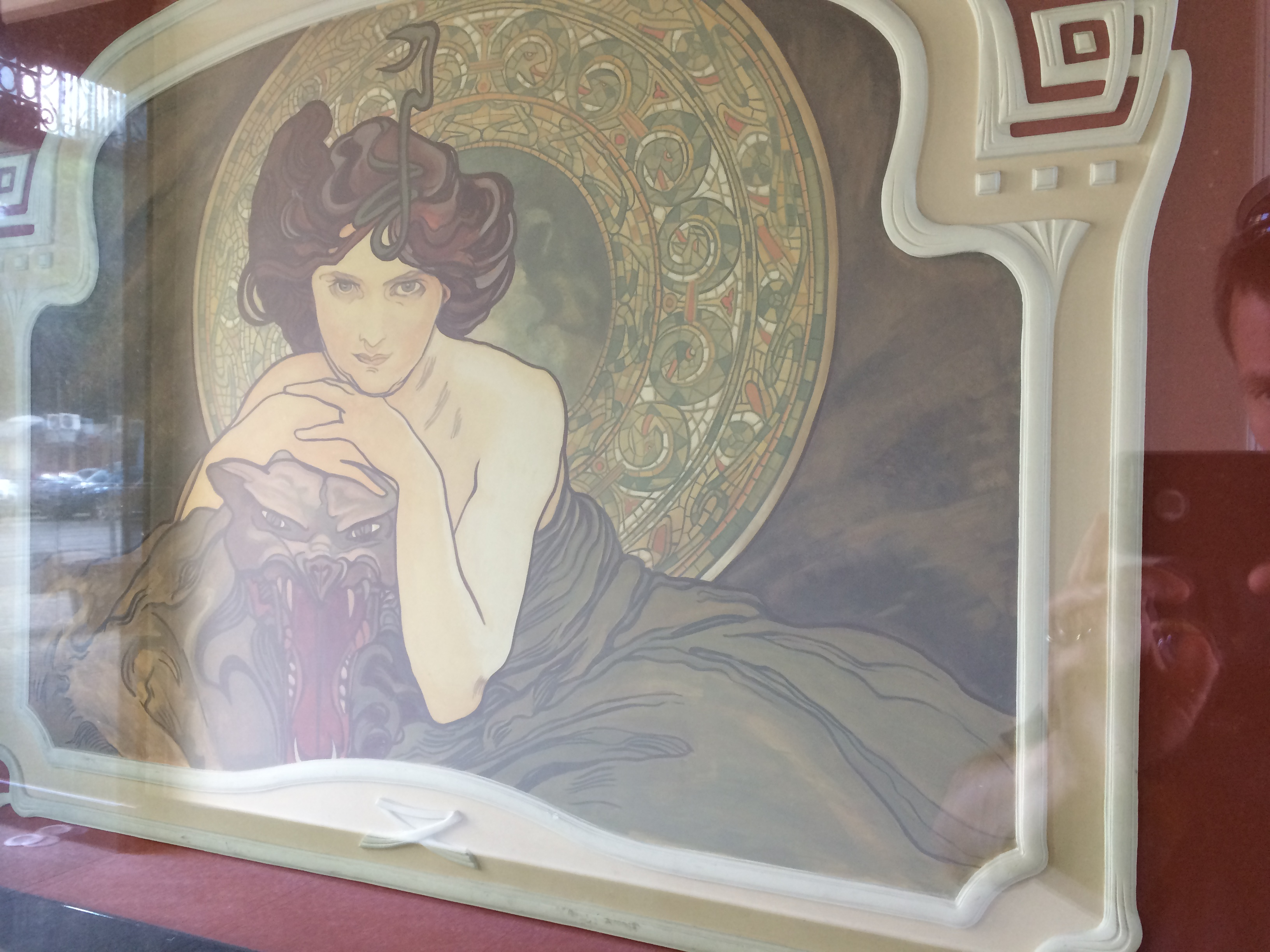
Art Nouveau wall picture

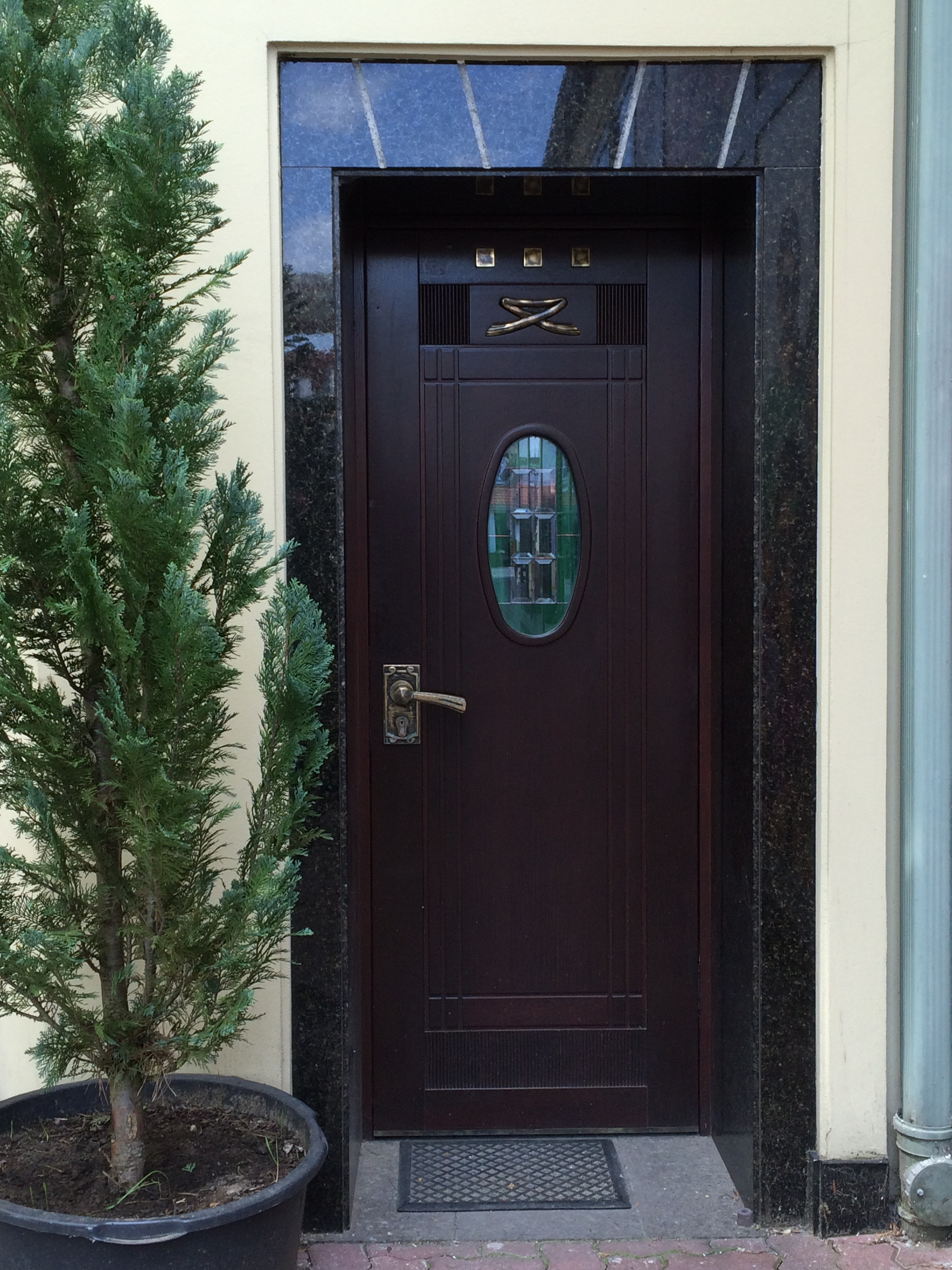
Backyard door

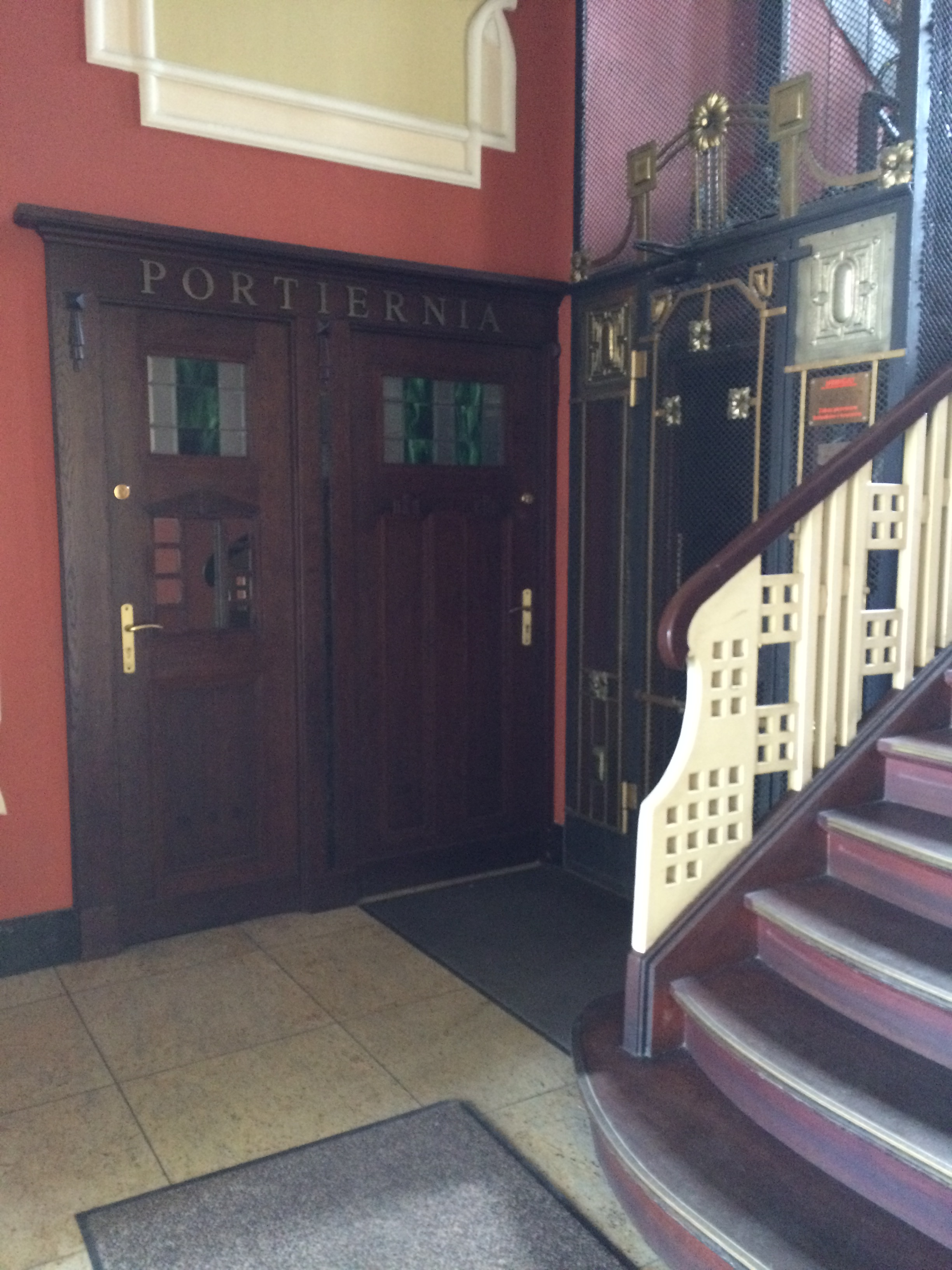
Historic elevator

== See also ==
- Bydgoszcz
- Gdanska Street in Bydgoszcz
- Freedom Square, Bydgoszcz
- Alfred Schleusener
- (in Polish) Downtown district in Bydgoszcz

== Bibliography ==
- (in Polish) Bręczewska-Kulesza Daria, Derkowska-Kostkowska Bogna, Wysocka A. (2003). Ulica Gdańska. Przewodnik historyczny. Bydgoszcz: Wojewódzki Ośrodek Kultury w Bydgoszczy. ISBN 9788386970100.
- (in Polish) Piórek, Magda (2006). Salon miasta. Kalendarz Bydgoski. Bydgoszcz: Towarzystwo Miłośników Miasta Bydgoszczy.
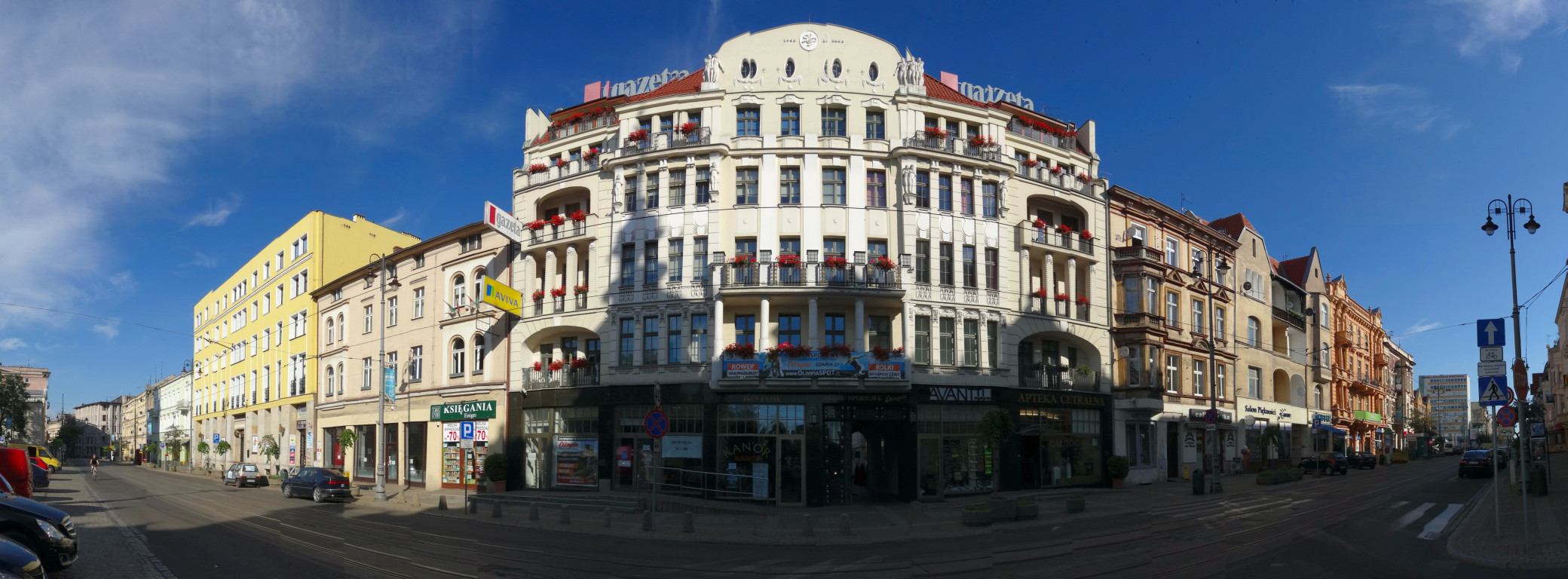
Panorama at 27 Gdańska Street, Tenement Carl Meinhardt
