= Henryk Grabiński =

Polish painter (1843–1903)

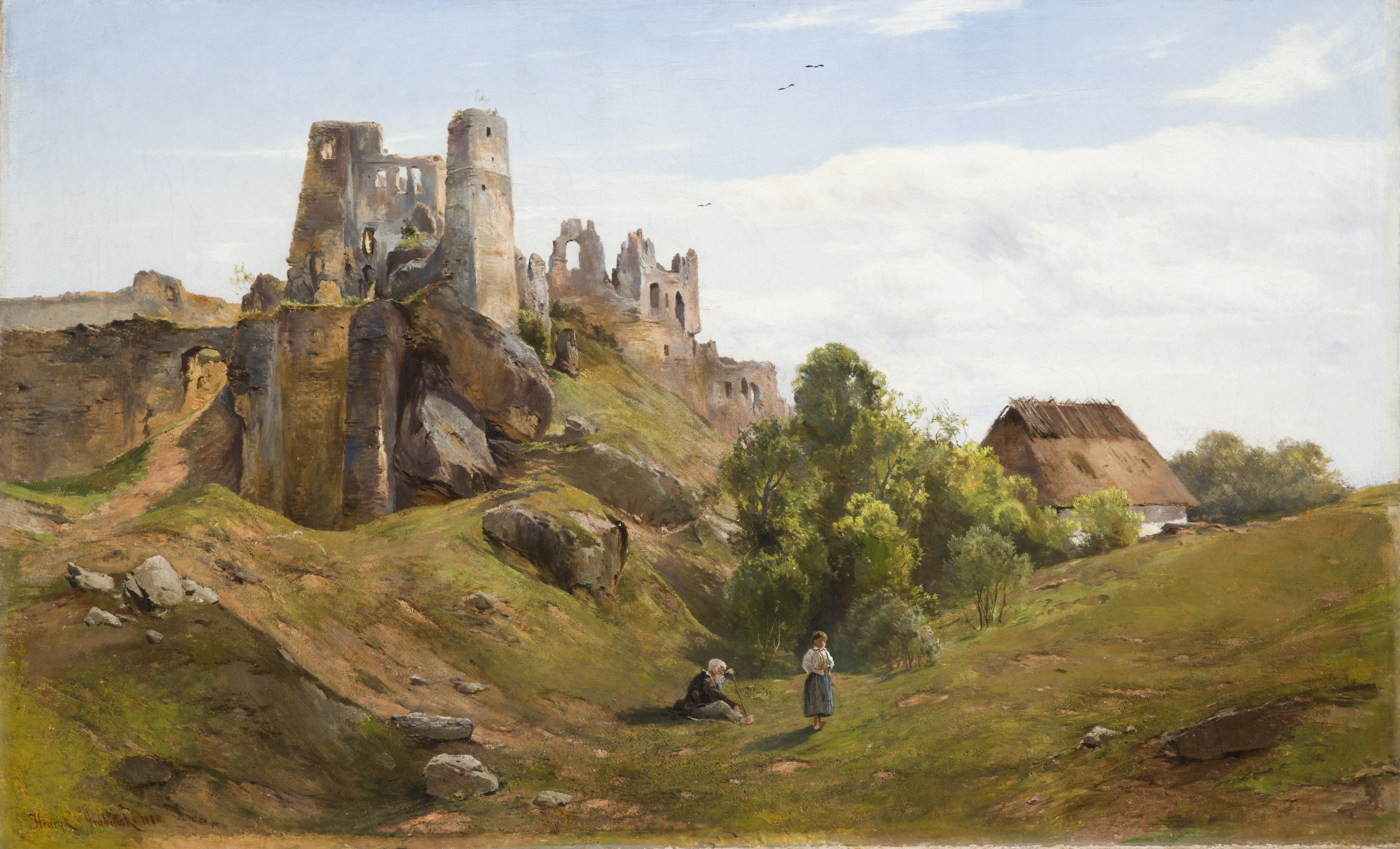
The Ruins of Kamieniec Castle, near Odrzykoń

Henryk Grabiński (1843, Lwów - 22 January 1903, Lwów) was a Polish landscape painter.

== Life and work ==
After training as a jeweller and goldsmith, he decided to pursue an artistic career instead, so he went to Vienna, where he studied at the Academy of Fine Arts from 1861 to 1866. His primary instructor there was the landscape painter, Albert Zimmermann. He was awarded first prize for one of his landscapes in 1865. He continued his studies at the Academy of Fine Arts, Munich, from 1868 to 1869. This was followed by trips to Paris, Italy, Tyrolia and Bavaria.

Upon returning to Poland, he divided his time between Kraków and Lwów; continuing to travel throughout Galicia, the Tatras and the Pienins, making sketches. From 1873 to 1877, he taught a basic course in landscape painting and drawing at the Academy of Fine Arts in Kraków. Jacek Malczewski was one of his best-known students there. Roman Kochanowski and Maurycy Gottlieb also studied with him.

After 1879, he settled permanently in Lwów. He suffered a serious illness in 1882, which left him unable to walk, but he continued to paint. In 1884, he wrote a textbook on landscape painting.
