= Polish Theatre, Bydgoszcz =

Theatre in Bydgoszcz, Poland

Polish Theatre in Bydgoszcz
- Polish: Teatr Polski im. Hieronima Konieczki
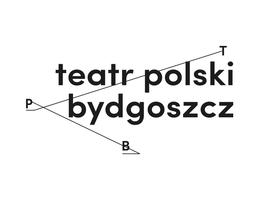
- Logo of the Polish Theatre in Bydgoszcz

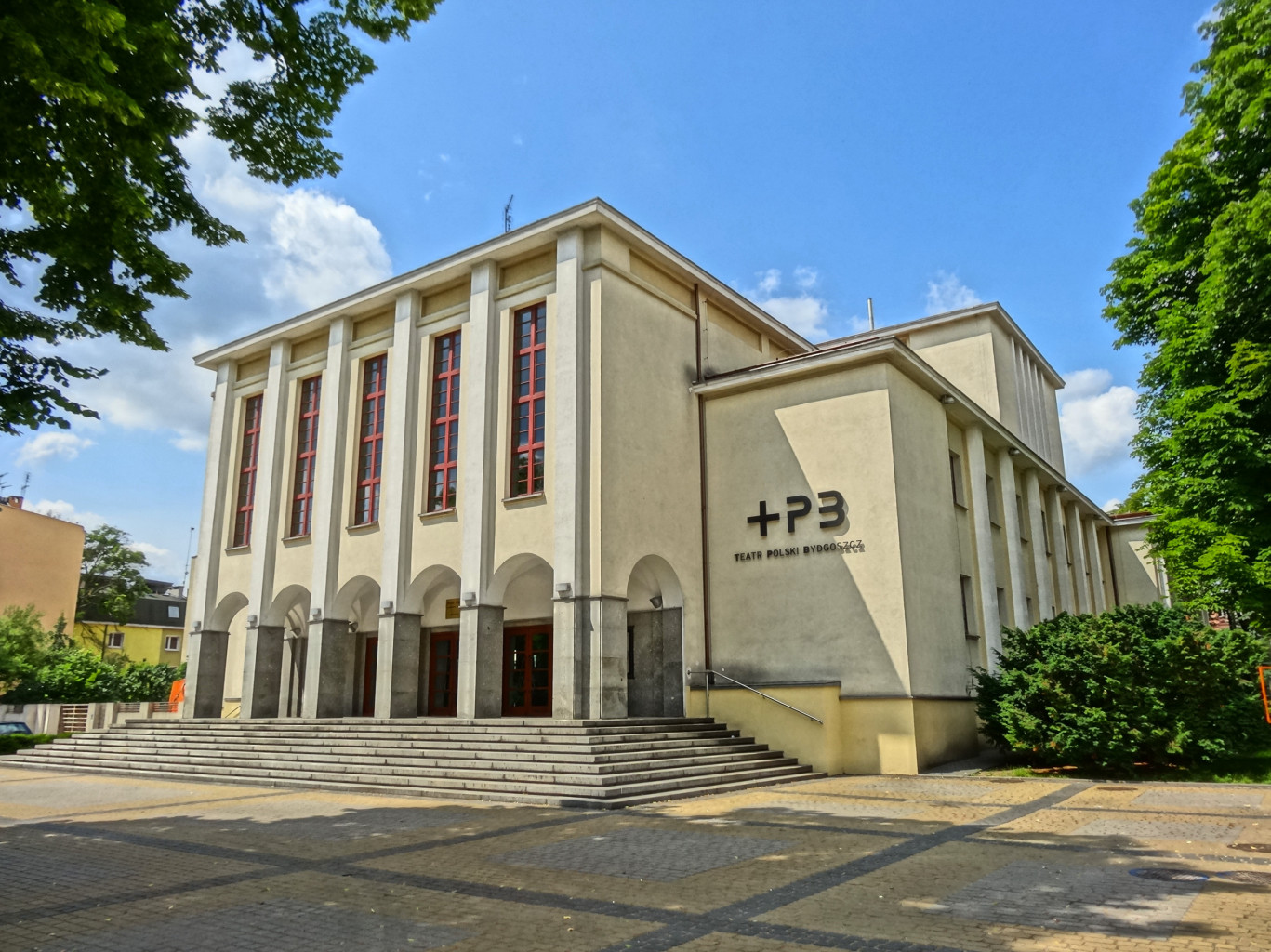
- View from Adam Mickiewicz Alley
- Interactive map of Polish Theatre in Bydgoszcz
- Full name: "Hieronim Konieczka" Polish Theatre in Bydgoszcz
- Address: 2 Adam Mickiewicz Alley
- Location: Bydgoszcz, Poland
- Coordinates: 53°06′43″N 18°00′48″E
- Owner: City of Bydgoszcz
- Type: Theatre
- Event: Theatre

Construction
- Groundbreaking: 1948
- Built: 1949
- Architect: Alfons Licznerski

Website
- teatrpolski.pl/publikacje.html

Polish Theatre in Bydgoszcz (Polish: Polski Teatr) is a theatre in Bydgoszcz, Poland. It has been established in 1949, at 2 Adam Mickiewicz Alley, in downtown district. It is the outcome of a long and rich tradition of plays and performance in the city.

== Location ==
The Polish Theatre building is located on a main thoroughfare of Bydgoszcz, at the crossing with 20 Stycznia 1920 Street, just a hundred metres from Gdańska Street. Its surroundings include:

- Jan Kochanowski Park, where the iconic statue The Archer stands facing the main elevation of the theatre;
- The building of the Pomeranian Philharmonic;
- Many Heritage-listed and historical edifices of downtown Bydgoszcz.

== History ==
=== Early times (17th century) ===
The first staging activity in Bydgoszcz occurred in 1623 when Jesuit school students acted (singing and dialogues) to welcome King Sigismund III Vasa to the city, on his way to Gdańsk. The same event happened in 1643 for the bishop of Chelmno Kasper Działyńsk. In 1648, at the occasion of the end of the Lent and also in 1649, a pastoral play was performed by a Jesuit scene and in 1680 a play relating the martyrdom of St. Stanislaus of Szczepanów was realized. In the following years, occasional theatre performances happened, celebrating school year, Corpus Christi, Christmas, etc. In 1696, was held a stage event prepared in honor of Jan Komorowski, founder of a new school building in Bydgoszcz. Jesuit Theatre was even run during the Great Northern War (1700–1721), culminating with the performance in honor of King Stanisław Leszczyński in 1734.

The transition to Prussian rule coincided exactly with Pope Clement XIV's decision to suppress the Society of Jesus. However Frederick the Great allowed them to continue to reside in the building college and lead a school. Performances were still held by students, but on a more modest scale. Besides, between 1773 and 1806, German professional theatre troupes started to tour:

- in 1788, a team created by children Karol Steinberg, Charlotte Schuh and Friedrich Bachmann;
- in 1790–1791, a troupe led by Miss Koppi and Mr. Runga (in Bromberg and Thorn);
- in 1805, theatre troupe of Karol Dobbelin;
- in 1806, Jan Gottlieb Heckert company.

The period of Duchy of Warsaw (1807–1815) raised Bydgoszcz as the capital of the new administrative unit (Bydgoszcz Department), bringing a revival of cultural life: theatre troupes performances flourished on a stage built in the ex-Jesuit college building, in the facility of the Society "Harmony". Amateurs (so-called "Social theatre"), but also professional companies presented plays for specific occasions (e.g. the birthday of Napoleon). In 1815, three professional troupes existed in Bydgoszcz: Kasper Kaminski, Wilhelm Vogel and Bernard Seibt. They presented, among others, Polish: Krakowiacy i Górale by Wojciech Bogusławski, and The Robbers (German: Die Räuber) by Friedrich Schiller.

=== Prussian period ===
In 1824, a theatre building was built on the foundations of the church of the Carmelites, on today's Theatre Square: it burned down in 1835 and rebuilt a year later. The repertoire presented professional theatrical and opera troupes from Königsberg, Gdańsk, Poznań, with actors performing in German and Polish language. Poles took part in all cultural events, as well as those organized by Prussia, and were also members of theatrical amateur teams of music and singing. An intensification of Germanisation inhibited the activity of Polish population in this cultural area.

The second half of the 19th century saw an increased cultural activity, with individual instances like Julian Prejs, a Bromberg writer and journalist (1865) or Tomasz Śniegocki who founded a Polish bookstore and reading room (1867), which helped Polish society to regain its own lost culture. In 1869, was founded "Reading Poland" – Polish: Czytelnia Polska – an important cultural and educational movement, aiming at disseminating Polish literature. In the years 1870–1871, following the military victory over France, German superiority culminated also in cultural field, with the movement called "Kulturkampf" (Fight for Culture). In reaction, appeared Polish companies and organizations, like the Singing Society "Halka" (1883), the People's Libraries Society (1881) or the Society for Popular Education (1873). Following this trend, Poles in Bydgoszcz performed Krakowiacy i Górale by Wojciech Bogusławski on April 15, 1894 for the 10th anniversary of the Battle of Racławice, and celebrated the centenary of Adam Mickiewicz's birth on December 8, 1898, by staging his ballads and romances. One of the most important institutions in this cultural flourish was the Municipal Theatre.

The creation of a permanent professional theatre in Poznań, on the initiative of Wladyslaw Bełzy in 1870 allowed Bydgoszcz audience to attend Polish plays: the Poznań troupe first toured the city on May 17, 1870, under the direction of Milosz Sztengel. The repertoire offered:

- Mazepa by Juliusz Słowacki, two years before the premiere in Warsaw;
- Zemsta (The Revenge), by Aleksander Fredro;
- Opera Jaunutis by Stanisław Moniuszko.

The entire repertoire listed exclusively Polish songs by, among others, Józef Ignacy Kraszewski, Józef Korzeniowski, L. A. Dmuszewski and Wojciech Bogusławski. Prussian authorities of Bromberg region looked negatively at Poznań troupes performances. Many times they declined the permit for them to perform in the city, arguing that Bromberg had "already three theatres", but all in German language. For Bydgoszcz audience, artists from Poznań have been a constant attraction, especially when staging "Kosciuszko songs" and patriotic texts.

Despite competition from professional actors, Bydgoszcz amateurs still gathered to play in associations. In 1859, W. H. Gehrmann, leading a German itinerant troupe briefly launched a summer theatre in Bydgoszcz. He reopened it in 1870, under the shape of a wooden building, realized by Bydgoszcz carpenter Adolf Berndt. On August 16, 1882, was built a new building, used by both German and Polish troupes, the "Theatre Viktoria". It stood in the backyard of today's 68 Gdanska Street. From 1892, the scene acted under the name "Elysium", then at Dantziger straße 134. There were presented mostly farces, operettas and vaudevilles, the decor displayed a painted panorama of the Old Market in Bydgoszcz.

In 1902, Prussian authorities banned Polish teams from acting occurrence in the Municipal Theatre. It was only in 1918 that this ban was lifted. Meanwhile, diverse group of amateurs staged in various places, such as the garden of the tenement at 35 Dworcowa Street: there were performed celebrations in honor of Henryk Sienkiewicz (1916) and the centenary of Kosciuszko (1917). In 1919 Polish troupe led by Ludwik Dybizbański arrived in Bromberg.

=== From 1920 to 1939 ===
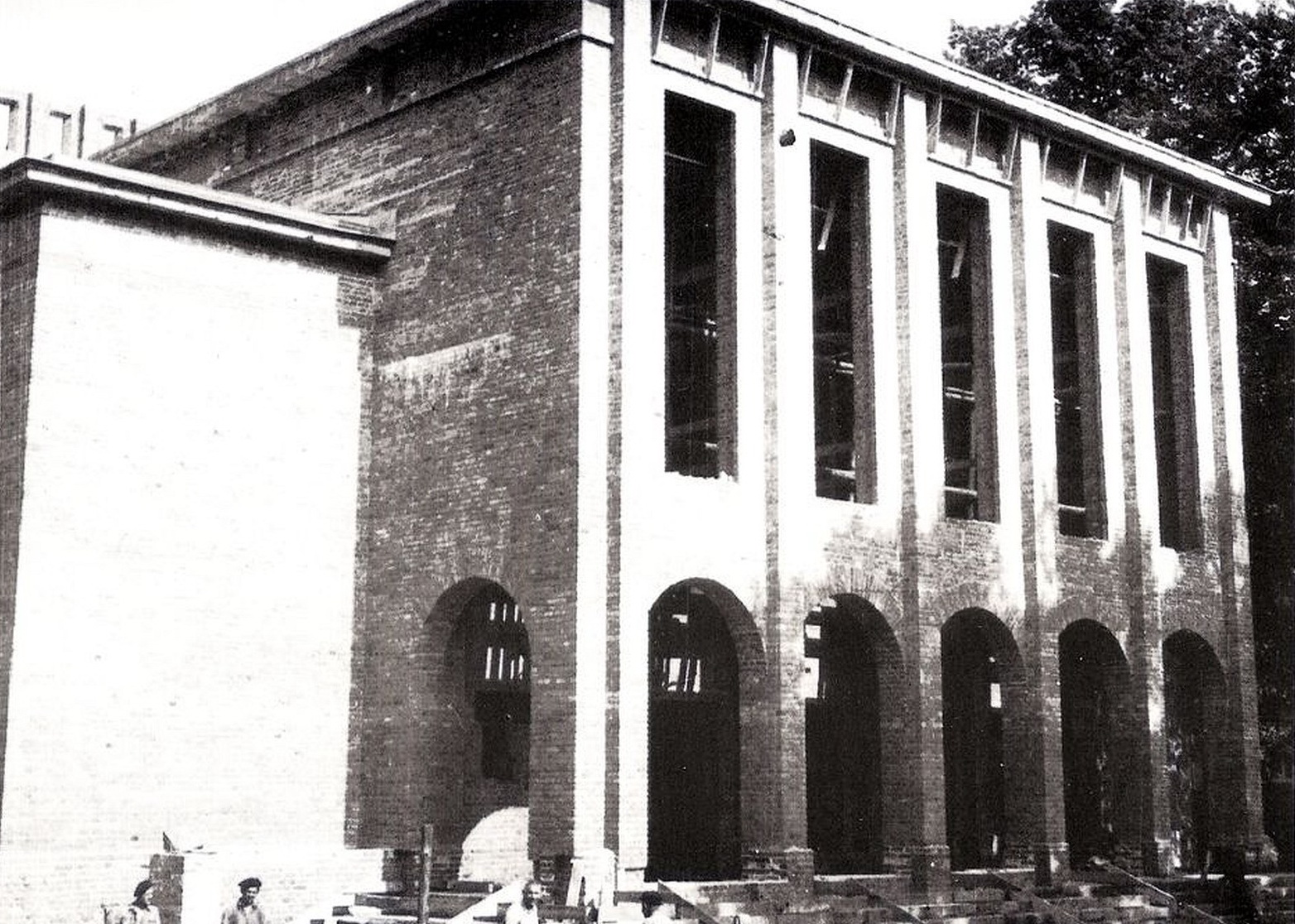
The current building under construction, c. 1948

- January 23, 1920: To celebrate the re-creation of the Polish state, DybizBański and his team played extracts of Adam Mickiewicz's Dziady and Warszawianka at the Municipal Theatre.
- August 24, 1920: Wanda Siemaszkowa was appointed as new director (until end of season 1921/1922).
- September 4, 1920: Season opened with Władysław Ludwik Anczyc's Kosciuszko at Raclawice. Ludwik Solski, a famous actor is present for the premiere.
- 1922: Józef Karbowski as new director.
- 1925: Bydgoszcz scene part of the newly created "United theatres of Bydgoszcz-Toruń-Grudziądz". Bydgoszcz stage under the leadership of Józef Krokowski.
- 1926–1927: Ludwik Dybizbański as director.
- 1927–1938: Wladyslaw Stoma as director.
- 1938–1939: Aleksandr Rodziewicz as director.

=== Polish People's Republic Period ===
The performance of Aleksander Fredro's Zemsta (The Revenge), on March 24, 1945 by Aleksandr Rodziewicz's troupe was the first after Nazi occupation. It was played 44 times and gathered 14000 audience, Polish and Soviet people together. The play, prepared within a month time, was held in the premises of the summer theatre "Elysium", which could only host 350 spectators and was lacking any proper professional equipment. It was a real revival of the Polish scene in the city.

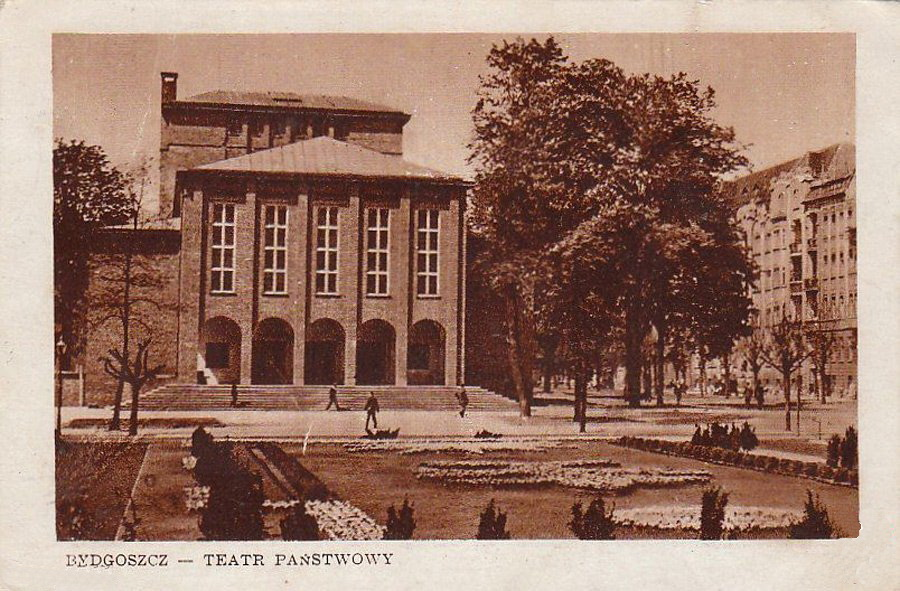
The theatre in the 1950s

After 1945, the scene moved from the Elisium, called the Little theatre (Polish: Teatr Mały), to the Chamber theatre at 14 Grodzka Street (1947).

In October 1949, a new association of state-owned scenes was established, "The Pomeranian State Theatres Bydgoszcz-Toruń" under lead of A. Rodziewicz: it lasted 10 years before each theatre troupe regained its independence. At the time, most of the performances were focused on contemporary drama, and mostly Soviet-mind oriented. Eventually, in autumn 1949, the construction of the Polish Theatre's current seat in Adam Mickiewicz Alley was finished: the construction of the building, projected by Alfons Licznerski, was funded by public collects. The inauguration occurred on October 6, with a premiere of Juliusz Słowacki's Mazepa .

In 1960, Bydgoszcz scene got back its name of Teatr Polski, while remaining part of the state company became the "Dramatic Theatres of Bydgoszcz and Toruń." The same year, on November 5, the Chamber theatre in Grodzka Street was reopened as another city scene, initially conceived as a stage for cabaret-theatre.

=== Since 1989 ===
On June 28, 2000, the Polish Theatre was christened Hieronim Konieczka, who was an actor, director and culture animator associated with Bydgoszcz.

Adam Orzechowski, then director, launched in 2002 a national theatre festival, the Premiere Festival in Bydgoszcz (Polish: Festiwal Prapremier). It occurs at the Polish Theatre in Bydgoszcz every autumn and its program includes world premieres. It is now directed by Paul Łysak.

Another festival, Camera Obscura, promoting documentary films, is held annually since 2004: it is organized by Bydgoszcz association Fundację Sztuki Art House.

== Gallery ==
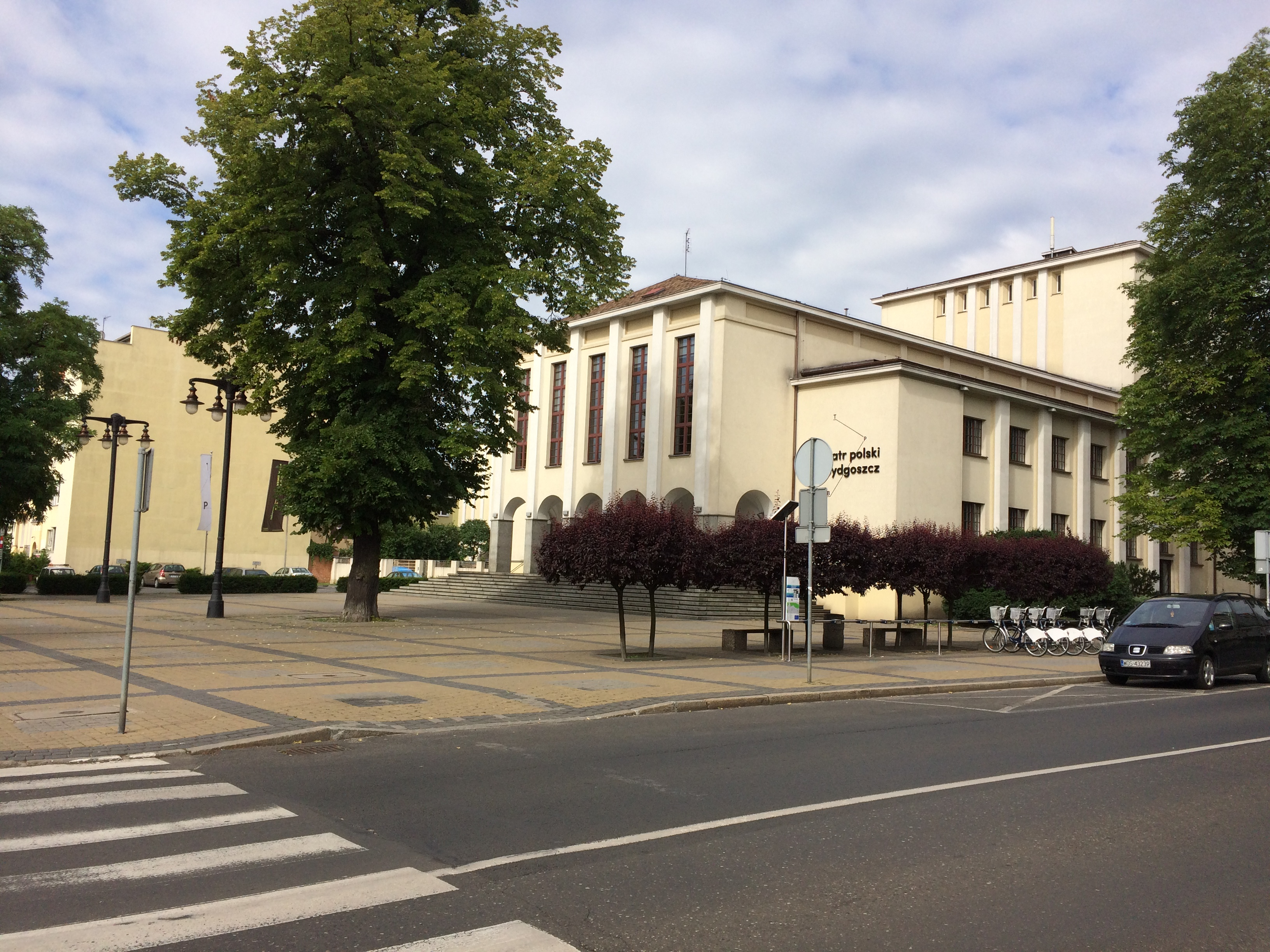
View from Adam Mickiewicz Alley

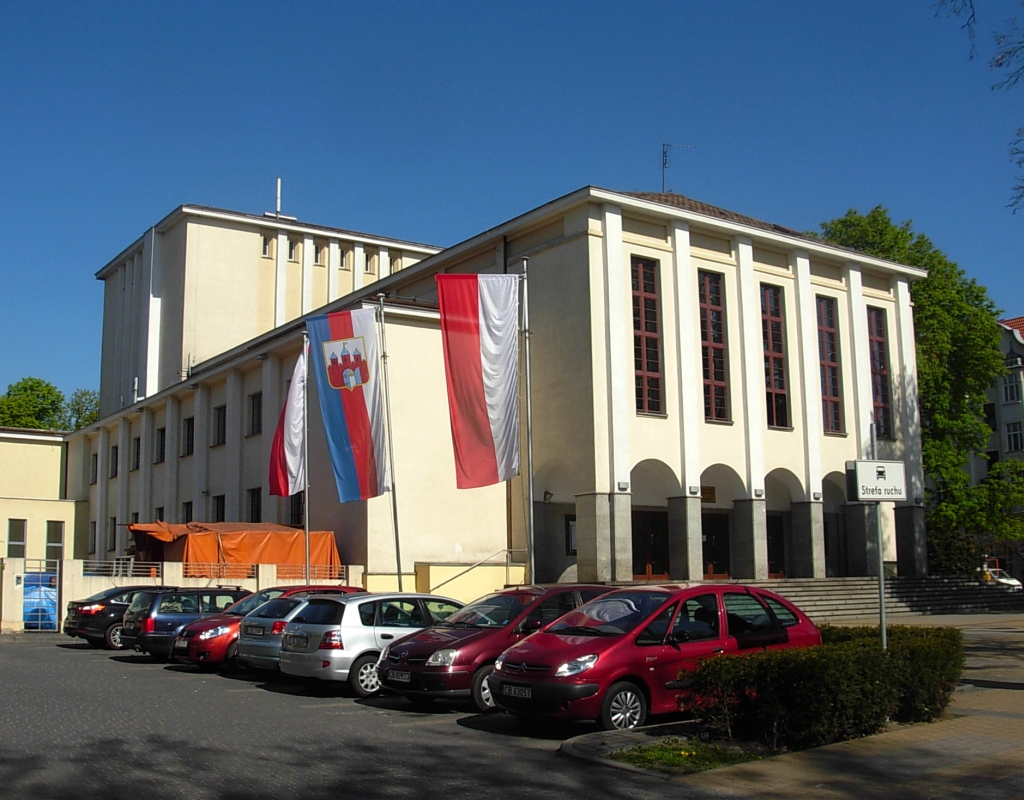
Main entrance

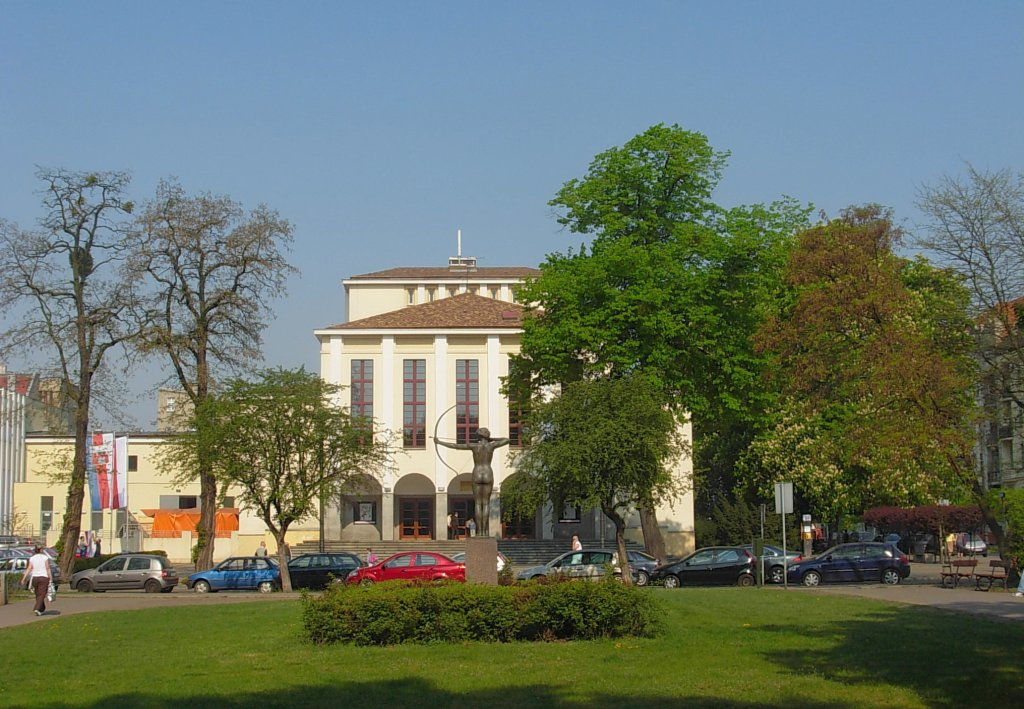
View from Jan Kochanowski park

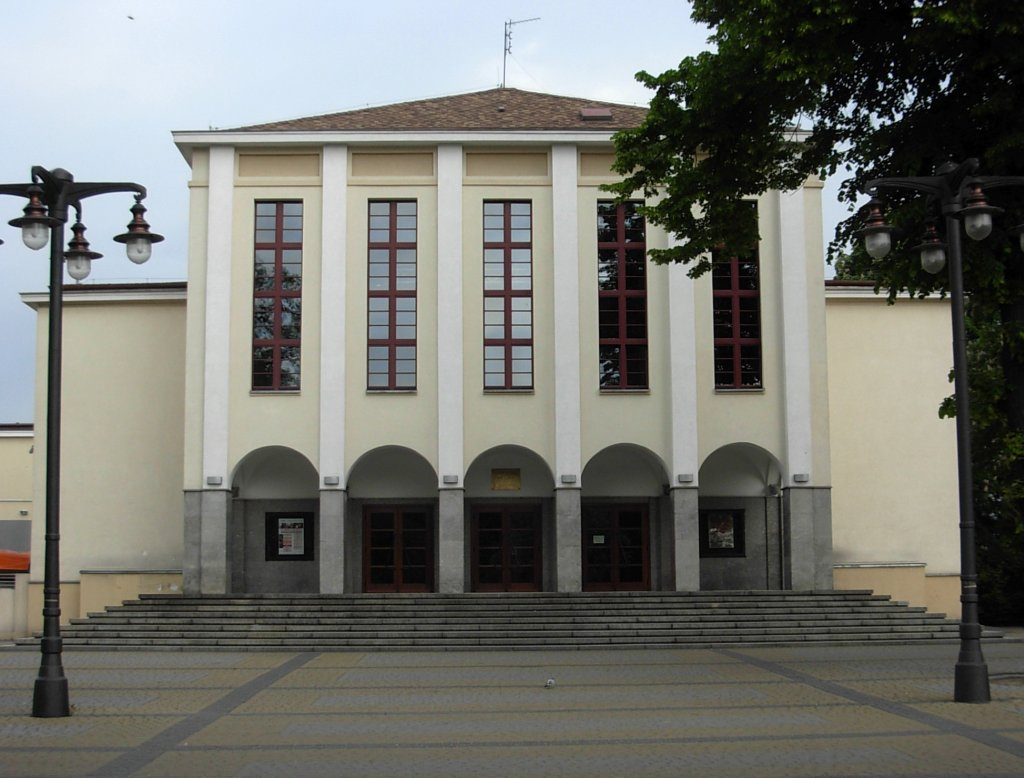
Main frontage

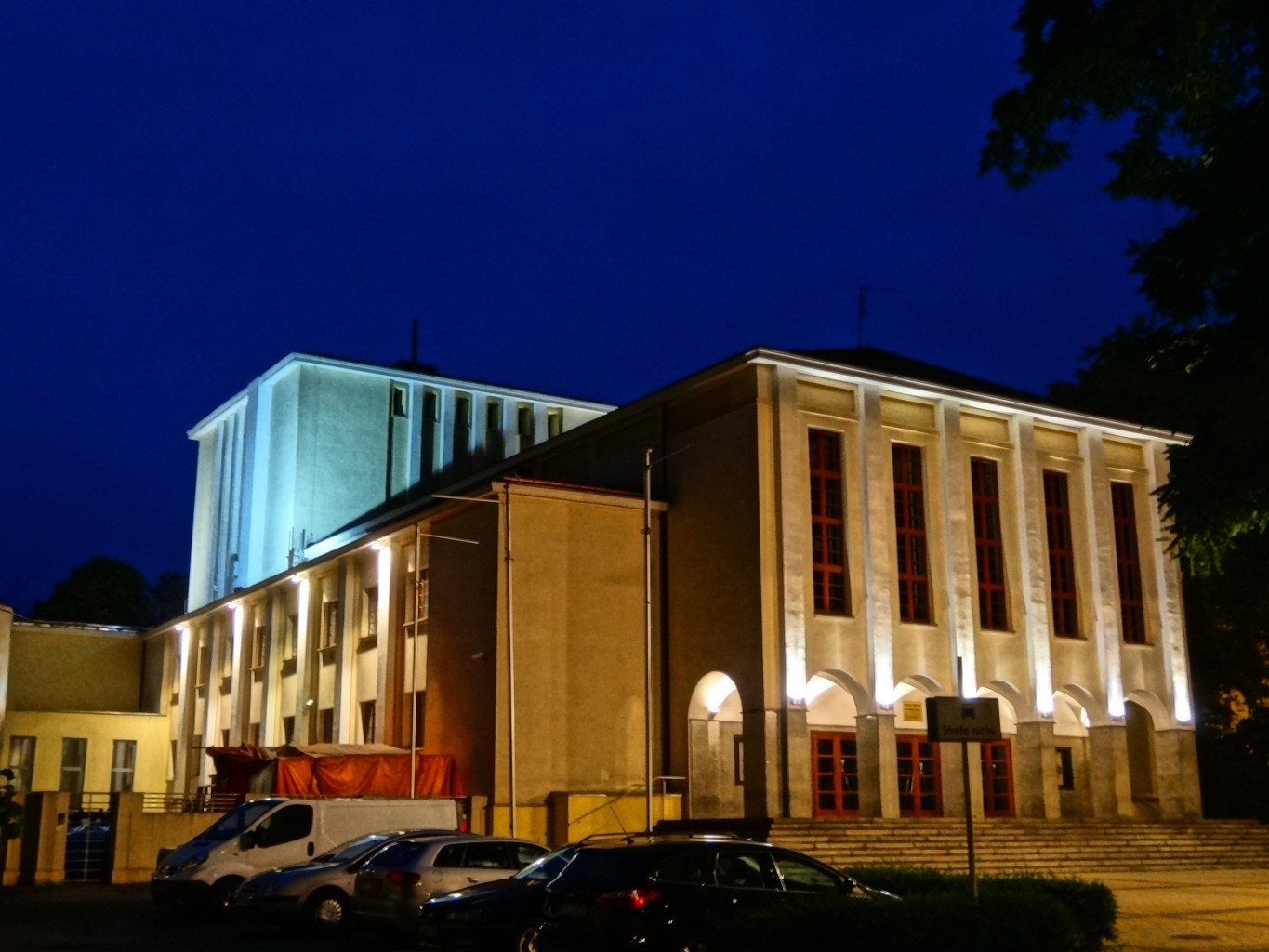
By night

== See also ==
- Theatre of Poland

== Bibliography ==
- Piechocka, Ewa (1984). Bydgoski teatr w latach 1945-1958.Kalendarz Bydgoski. Bydgoszcz: Towarzystwo Miłosnikow Miasta Bydgoszczy. pp. 120–124. (in Polish)
- Gabrusiewicz, A (1969). Teatr w Bydgoszczy. Kalendarz Bydgoski. Bydgoszcz: Towarzystwo Miłosnikow Miasta Bydgoszczy. pp. 116–120. (in Polish)
- Sucharska, Anna (1982). Z dziejów teatru w Bydgoszczy po 1945 r. Kalendarz Bydgoski. Bydgoszcz: Towarzystwo Miłosnikow Miasta Bydgoszczy. pp. 93–96. (in Polish)
- Mrozek, Zdzisław (1993). Z tradycji teatralnych Bydgoszczy (do roku 1918). Kalendarz Bydgoski. Bydgoszcz: Towarzystwo Miłosnikow Miasta Bydgoszczy. pp. 87–94. (in Polish)
