= Roman Kochanowski =

Polish painter (1857–1945)

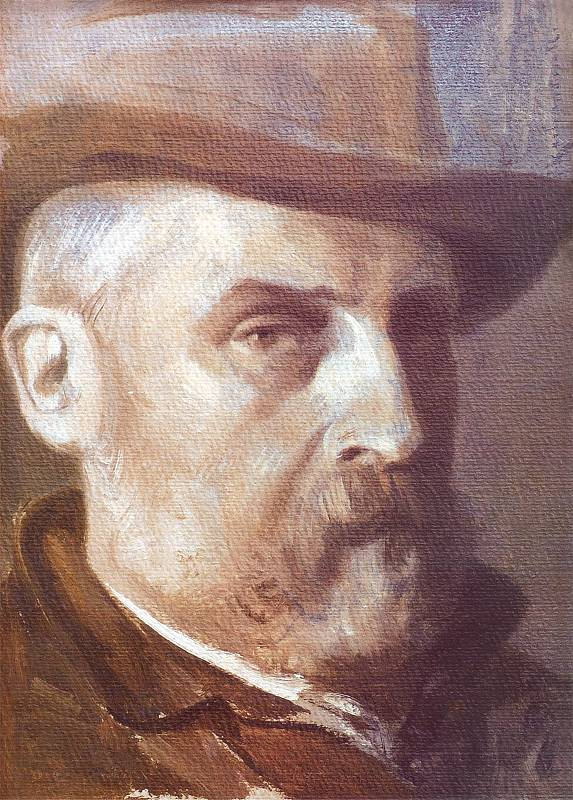
Self-portrait (1900)

Roman Kochanowski (28 February 1857 – 3 August 1945) was a Polish painter and illustrator who lived in Germany. He is mostly known for his landscapes, although he occasionally did portraits as well.

== Biography ==
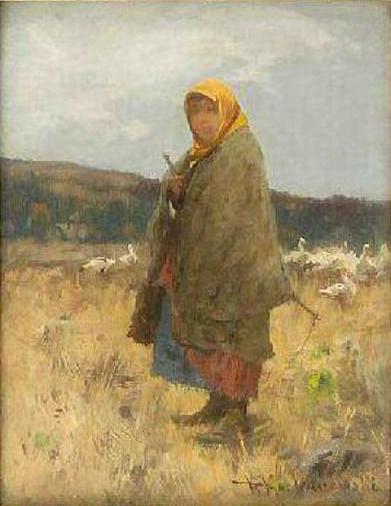
Goose Girl

Kochanowski was born in Kraków. His father was a well-to-do craftsman. His first drawing lessons were with Maksymilian Cercha. He began his formal studies in 1874 at the Kraków Academy of Fine Arts with Władysław Łuszczkiewicz and Henryk Grabiński.

The following year, he transferred to the Academy of Fine Arts, Vienna, where he studied with Christian Griepenkerl then, from 1876 to 1878, with Eduard von Lichtenfels in the landscape department. While there, he exhibited at home with the Kraków Society of Friends of Fine Art and its counterparts in Warsaw and Lwów. In 1881, he moved to Munich, and remained until his death, although he maintained close ties with Poland. In 1892, he married Maria Keffel.

Throughout his early career, he exhibited internationally; including shows in Vienna (1886–1899), Salzburg (1891, 1895) and London (1891). In 1888, at an exhibition in Vienna, his painting Winter in Poland was purchased by Emperor Franz Joseph I. He was also one of several Polish artists who participated in providing illustrations for The Austro-Hungarian Monarchy in Word and Picture (Kronprinzenwerk), a 24-volume encyclopedia. He also regularly provided illustrations for Polish periodicals; notably Tygodnik Illustrowany.

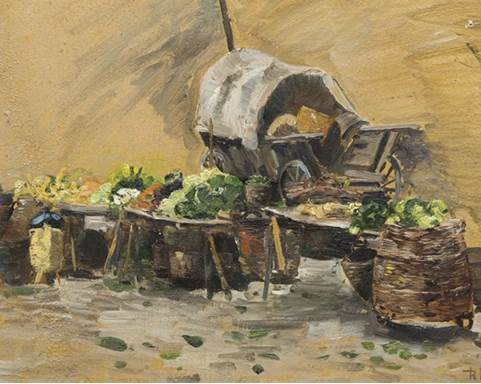
Market Stall

He was a member of the "Munich Kunstverein" (art society) and the "Künstlergenossenschaft" (cooperative society) and sat on their contest juries after 1901. Five years later, he became a corresponding member of the "Union Internationale des Beaux-Art".

Kochanowski died in 1945 in Freising. In 1951, his son donated a large collection of his works to the National Museum, Warsaw. In 2009, the Historical Museum of Kraków mounted a large retrospective of his work and life, including documents and memorabilia.
