= Eduard Schulz Building =

Eduard Schulz Tenement
- Polish: Kamienica Eduarda Schulza w Bydgoszczy
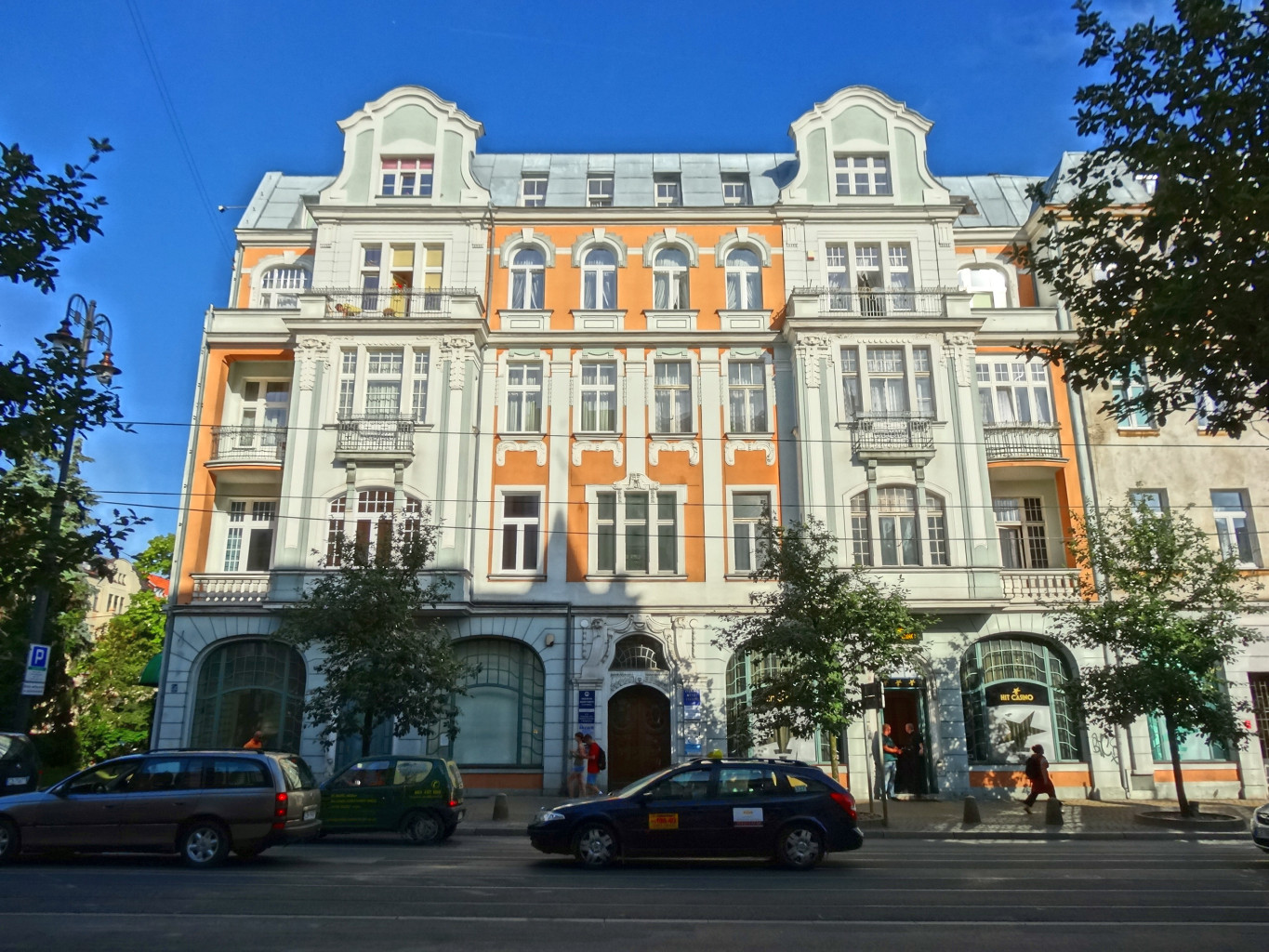
- Tenement from Gdańska Street

- Location within Poland

General information
- Type: Tenement
- Architectural style: Art Nouveau
- Location: 66/68 Gdańska Street, Bydgoszcz, Poland
- Coordinates: 53°7′54″N 18°0′34″E
- Groundbreaking: 1904
- Completed: 1905
- Client: Eduard Schulz

Technical details
- Floor count: 4

Design and construction
- Architect: Rudolf Kern

Eduard Schulz Tenement is a habitation house located at 66/68 Gdańska Street in Bydgoszcz, Poland.

== Location ==
The building stands on the eastern side of Gdańska Street, between Słowackiego street and Adam Mickiewicz Alley. It is close to Alfred Schleusener Tenement at Nr.62, another historical building in the same street.

== History ==
=== 19th century ===
In the middle of the 19th century, Karl Hildebrandt a judicial executor opened in the back yard a summer garden and a bowling. In 1882, in the garden at the back of the property was built a wooden summer theater, originally called Victoria, on the design of architects Józef Święcicki and Anton Hoffmann. Theater and concerts performances were held here.

The new house was standing on a previous building where Eduard Schulz was living since 1893. He had there his restaurant, Elysium.

=== Eduard Schulz's period ===
The tenement has been built in 1904-1905 for the restaurateur Eduard Schulz by the architect Rudolf Kern.

The building is stretched along Nr.66 and Nr.68 of Gdańska Street: both houses formed a complex network for house and business purposes. Its address was, in Bromberg's time, 134 Danzigerstrasse.

Eduard Schulz opened there a new restaurant, Zum Reichskanzler (To the Reich Chancellor).

=== 1920s till today ===
In 1922, the Company Deutsches Haus became the new owner of the lot: it ran in the premises a restaurant, a German theater Deutsche Bühne and a hotel until 1945.

After World War II, a new restaurant, Słowianka, has been set up there. In the period 1947-1949 at the very place of the old wood theater was built the actual Polish Theatre by architect Alfons Licznerski.

In the upper levels a disco club opened in November 1975.

Today, Nr.68 houses the District Chamber of Legal Advisers of Bydgoszcz.

== Architecture ==
Eduard Schulz tenement has got an Art Nouveau decorated facade decoration, significantly impoverished as a result of renovation and rehabilitation.

Initial decoration of Nr.66 frontage have been revived by a refurbishment during summer 2016. Likewise, on the facade of Nr.68, one can still notice gargoyles and stylized floral motifs. Inside are still preserved a staircase with its original door, railings and stuccoes.

== Gallery ==
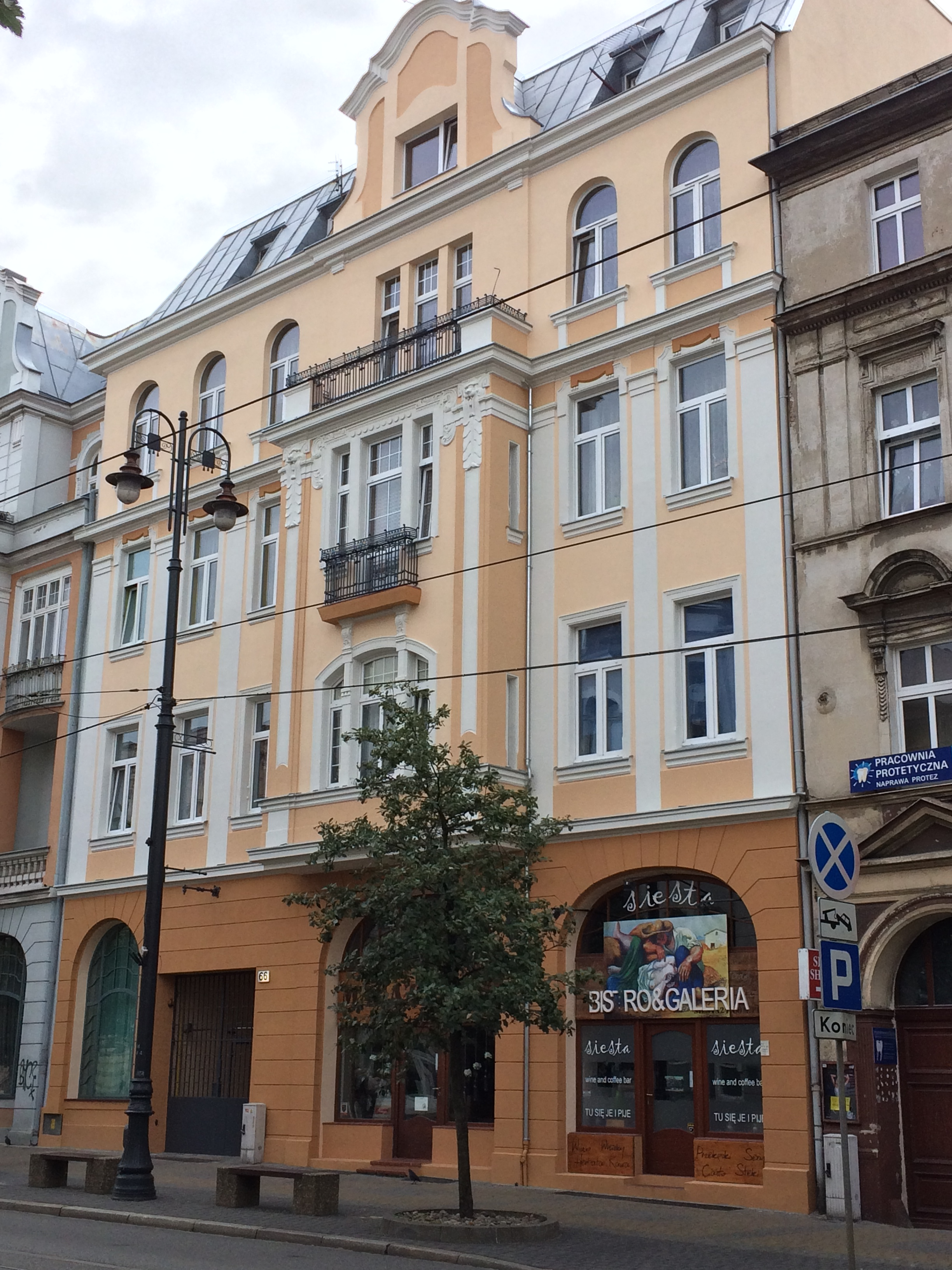
Gdańska 66 building

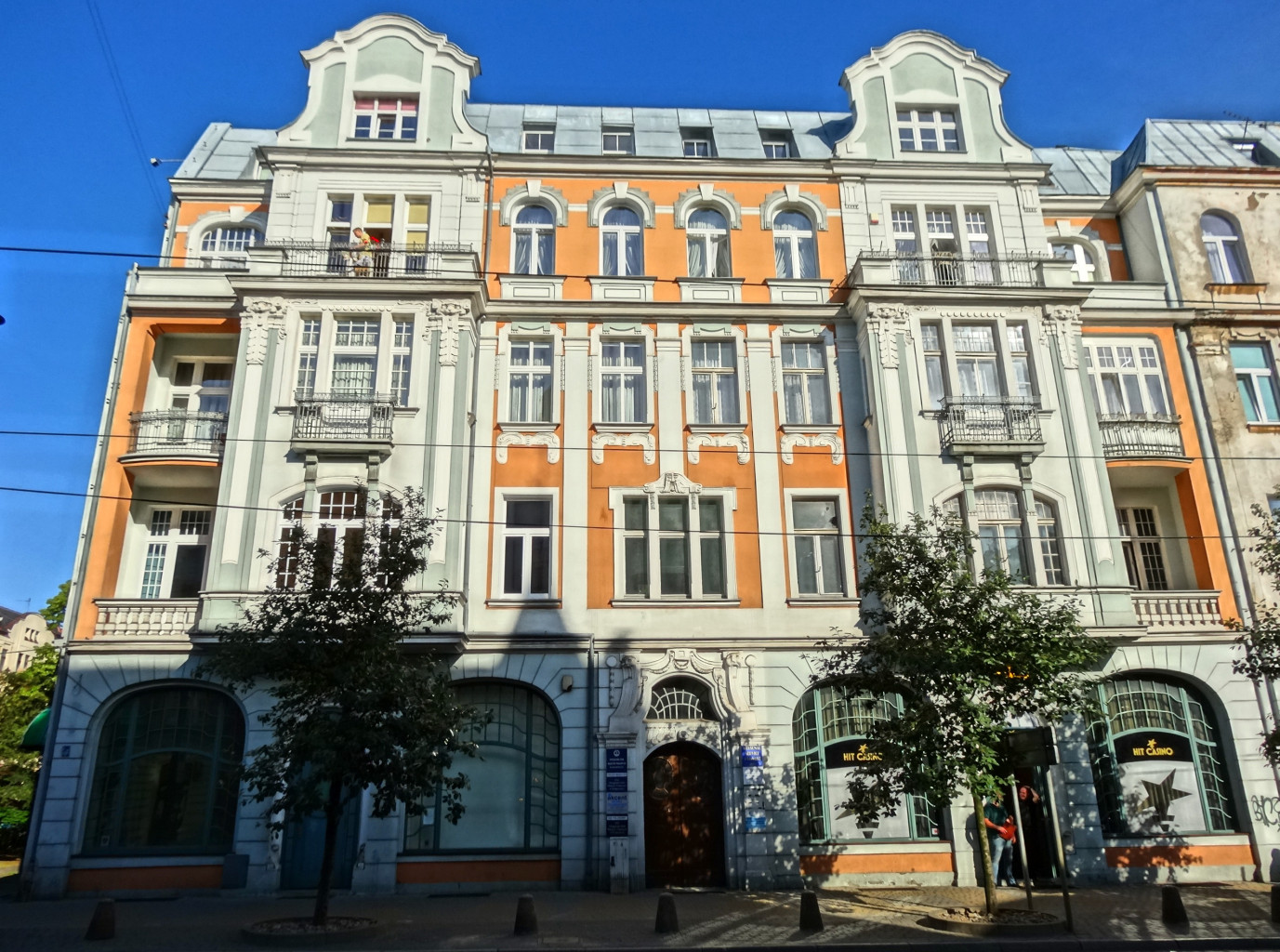
Gdańska 68 building

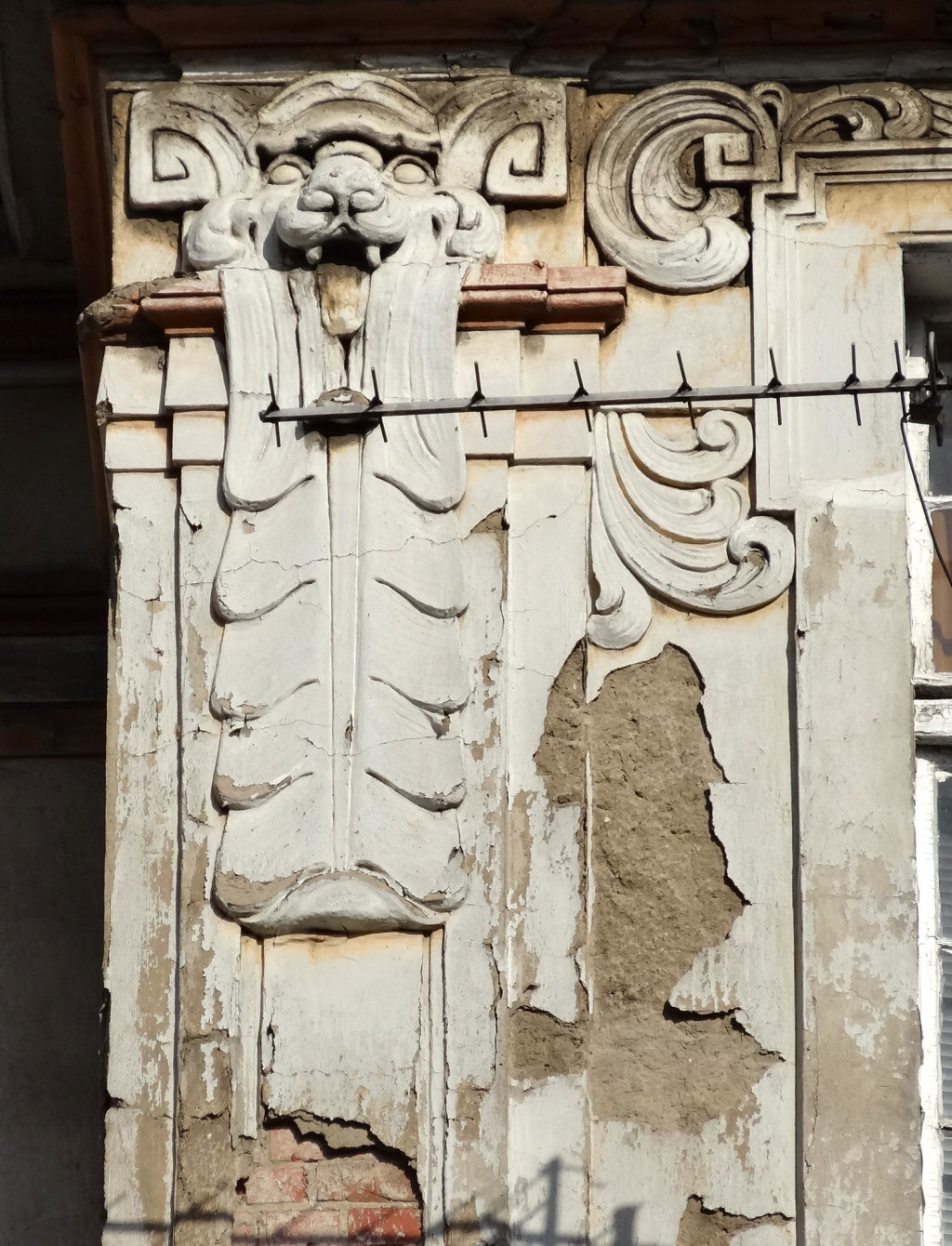
Art Nouveau elements on the building at 66

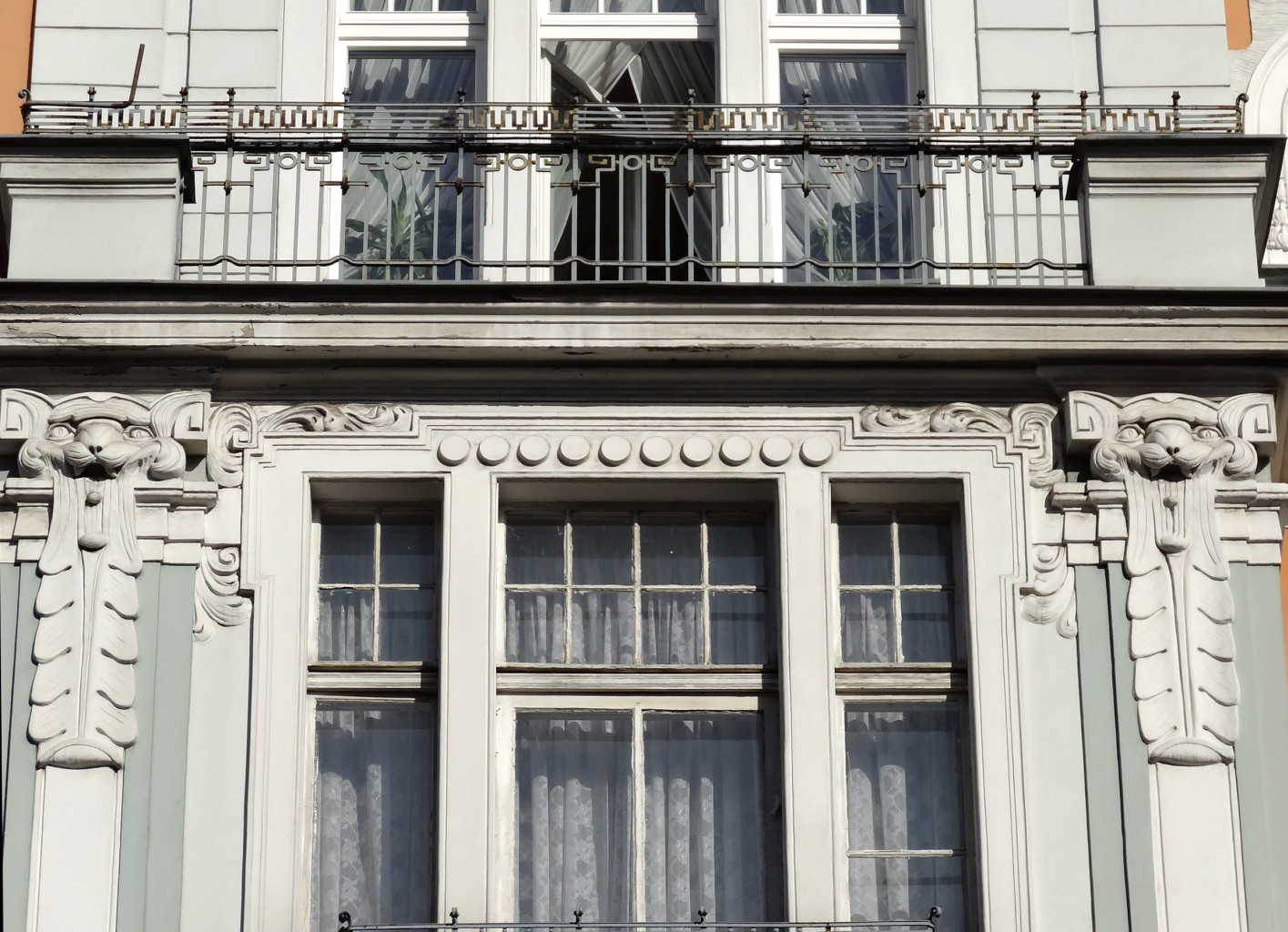
Decorations on Nr.68 building facade

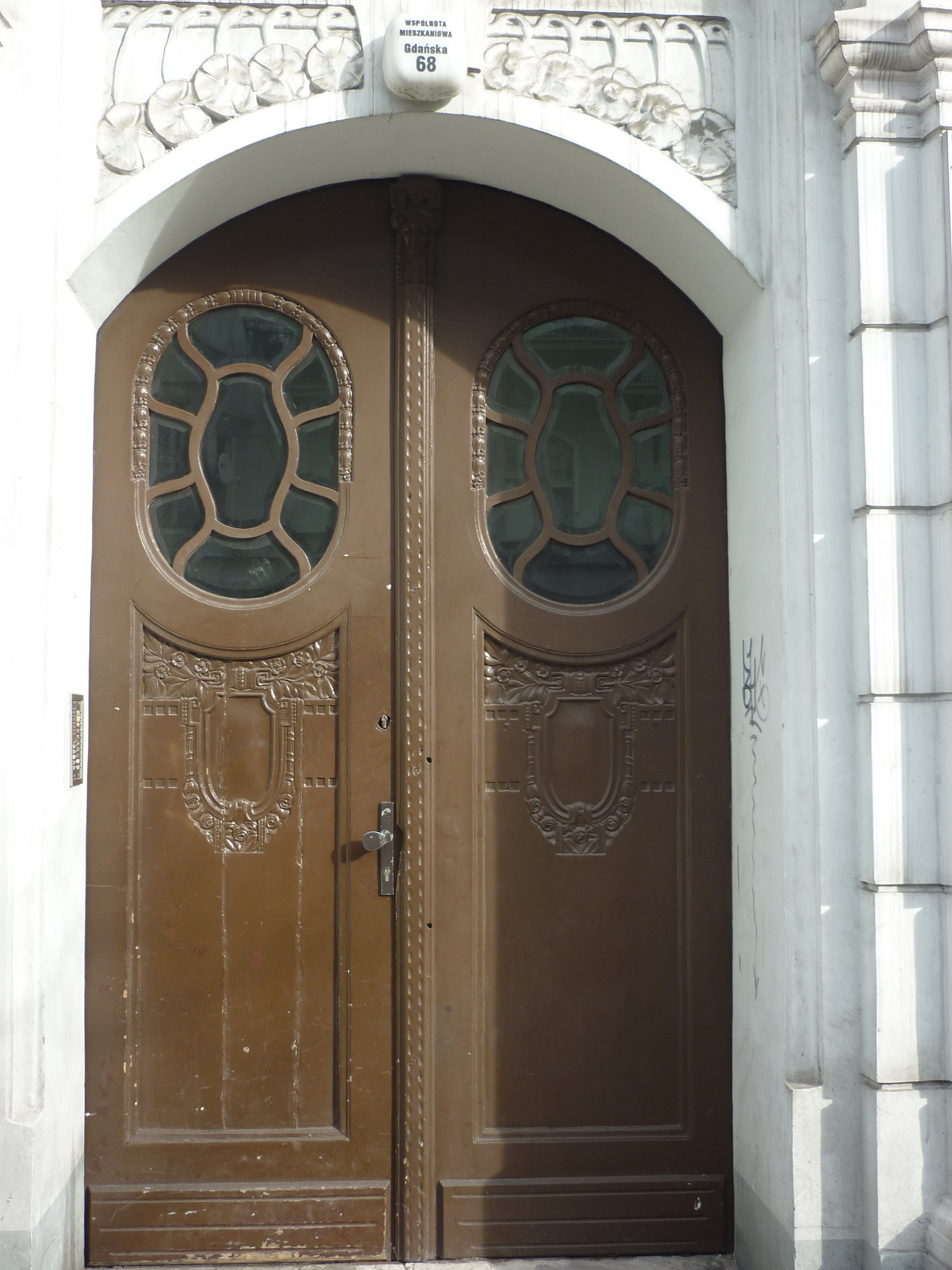
Door detail (Nr.68)

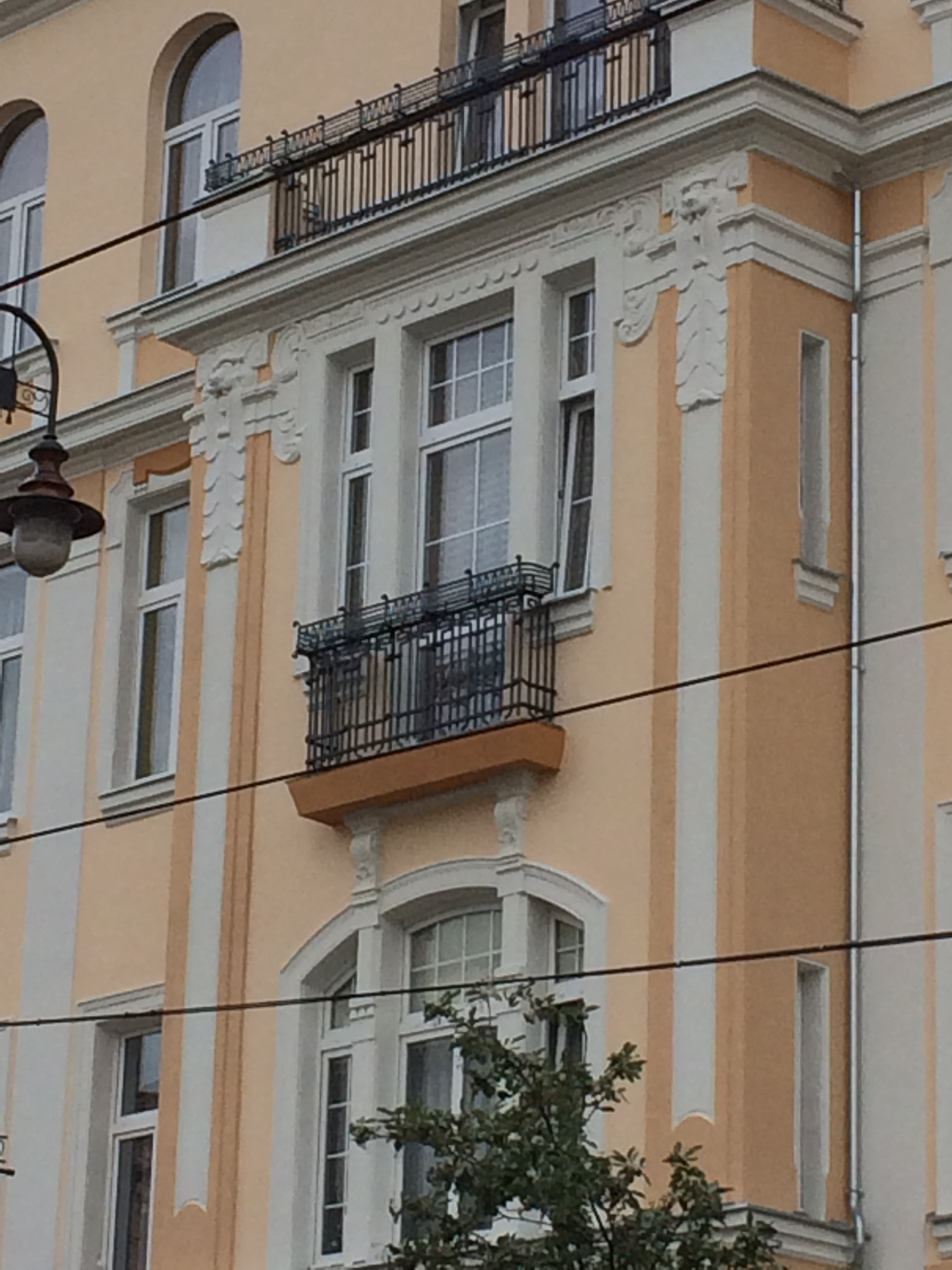
Bay window at Nr.66

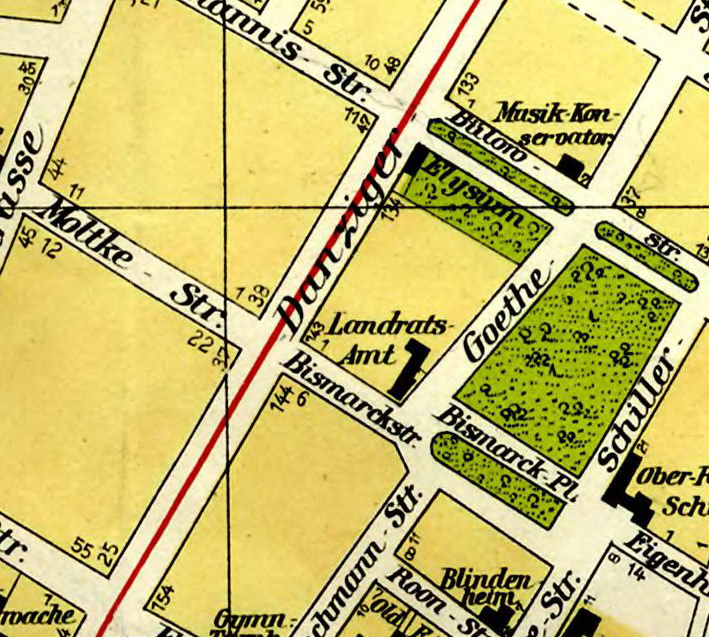
Detail of 1914 Bromberg map with the restaurant "Elysium"

== See also ==
- Bydgoszcz
- Gdanska Street in Bydgoszcz
- Polish Theatre in Bydgoszcz
- Rudolf Kern
- Alfons Licznerski

== Bibliography ==
- (in Polish) Bręczewska-Kulesza Daria, Derkowska-Kostkowska Bogna, Wysocka A. (2003). Ulica Gdańska. Przewodnik historyczny. Bydgoszcz: Wojewódzki Ośrodek Kultury w Bydgoszczy. ISBN 9788386970100.
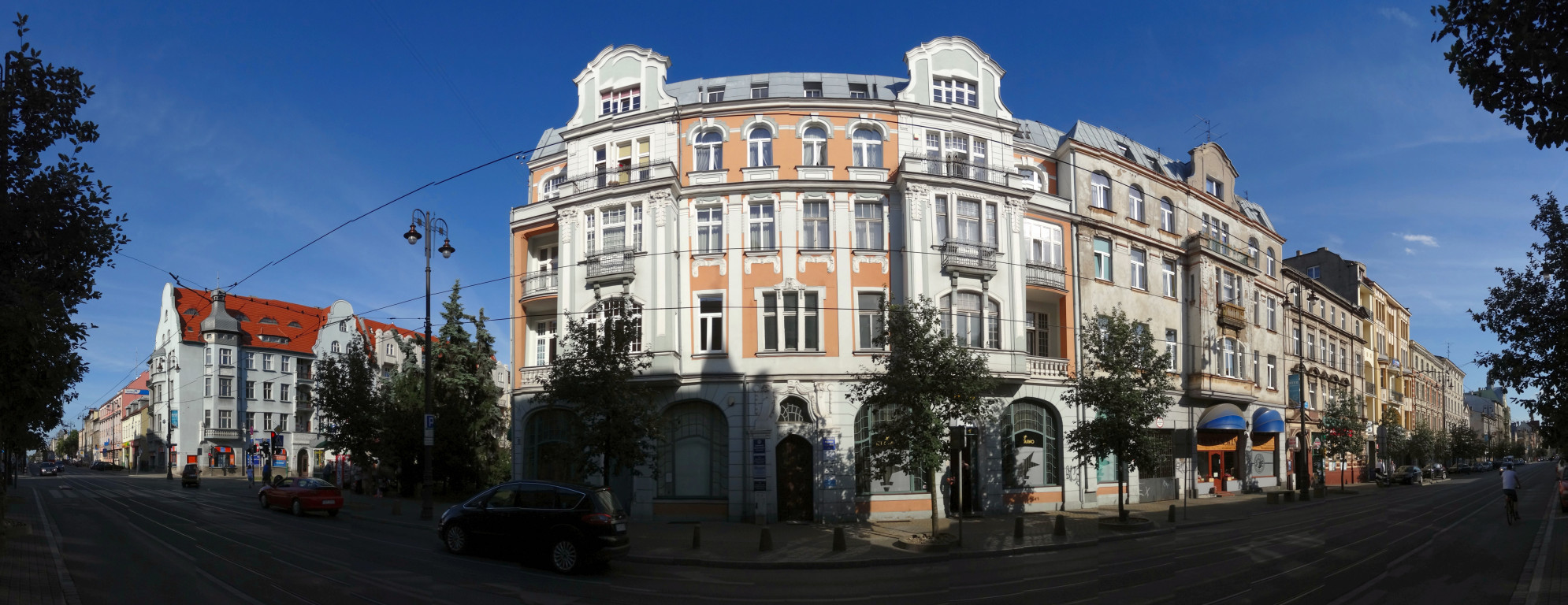
Panorama on Eduard Schulz's building
