= Odrzykoń =

Village in Krosno County, Podkarpackie Voivodeship, Poland

- Village
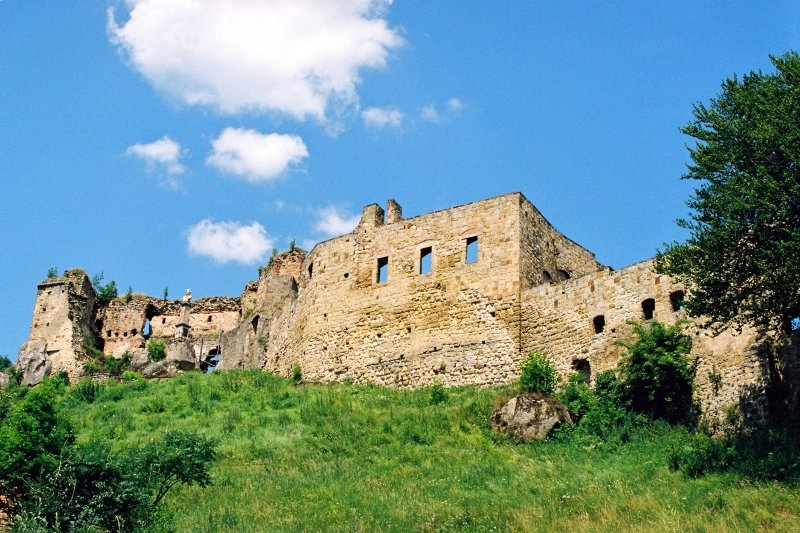
- Ruins of Kamieniec Castle, first recorded mention in 1348

- Location within Poland
- Coordinates: 49°45′N 21°45′E
- Country: Poland
- Voivodeship: Subcarpathian
- County: Krosno
- Gmina: Wojaszówka

Population
  - Total: 2,900
- Time zone: UTC+1 (CET)
  - Summer (DST): UTC+2 (CEST)

Odrzykoń [ɔˈdʐɨkɔɲ] is a village in the administrative district of Gmina Wojaszówka, within Krosno County, Podkarpackie Voivodeship, in south-eastern Poland.

== History ==
The history of human settlement here dates back to the period known as the Lusatian culture. In early Middle Ages, a Slavic gord existed here, later replaced with a wooden castle. The castle was burned during the Mongol invasions of Poland, first in 1241 and again in 1259. In a 1348 document, the village was spelled Kamieniec; in 1402 - Ehremberg alias Orzykon; and in 1446, Odrzykoń.

In 1348, King Casimir III the Great built here Kamieniec Castle, which remained private property of the Kamieniecki family. In 1475, the castle was attacked by Hungarian troops of Matthias Corvinus. On March 12, 1526, Crown Hetman Marcin Kamieniecki invited to the castle Hungarian King John Zapolya, also Fausto Sozzini visited Kamieniec. On December 7, 1655, near Odrzykoń, a choragiew of Gabriel Wojnillowicz defeated Swedes in the Battle of Krosno (see Deluge (history)). On March 16, 1657, the army of George II Rakoczi, allied with the Swedish Empire, entered southern Poland, capturing and burning the Kamieniec Castle. Rebuilt, the complex was once again destroyed by Swedes during the Great Northern War. During Bar Confederation, Polish rebels found refuge in the ruined and neglected castle.

In 1828, following the marriage of Aleksander Fredro with Zofia Skarbowa, the famous writer became owner of half of the ruined complex. Fredro based his Zemsta on a mid-17th century lawsuit between owners of the castle, Piotr Firlej and Jan Skotnicki. In 1831, after the November Uprising, a demented man named Jan Machnik of Dukla resided in the ruins. Seweryn Goszczynski based main character of his book “Król zamczyska” (“King of the Castle”) on Machnik.

Five Polish citizens were murdered by Nazi Germany in the village during World War II.

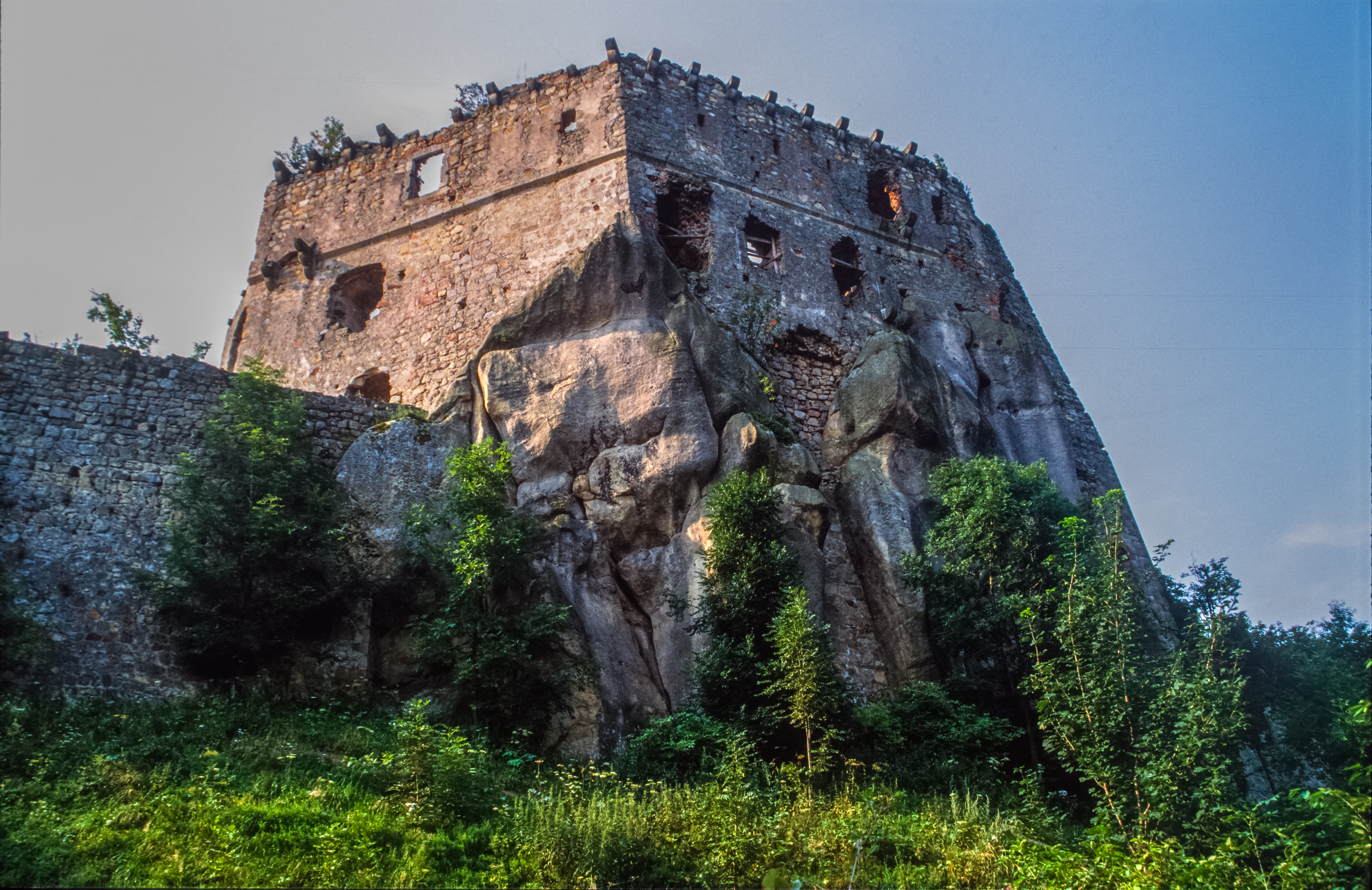

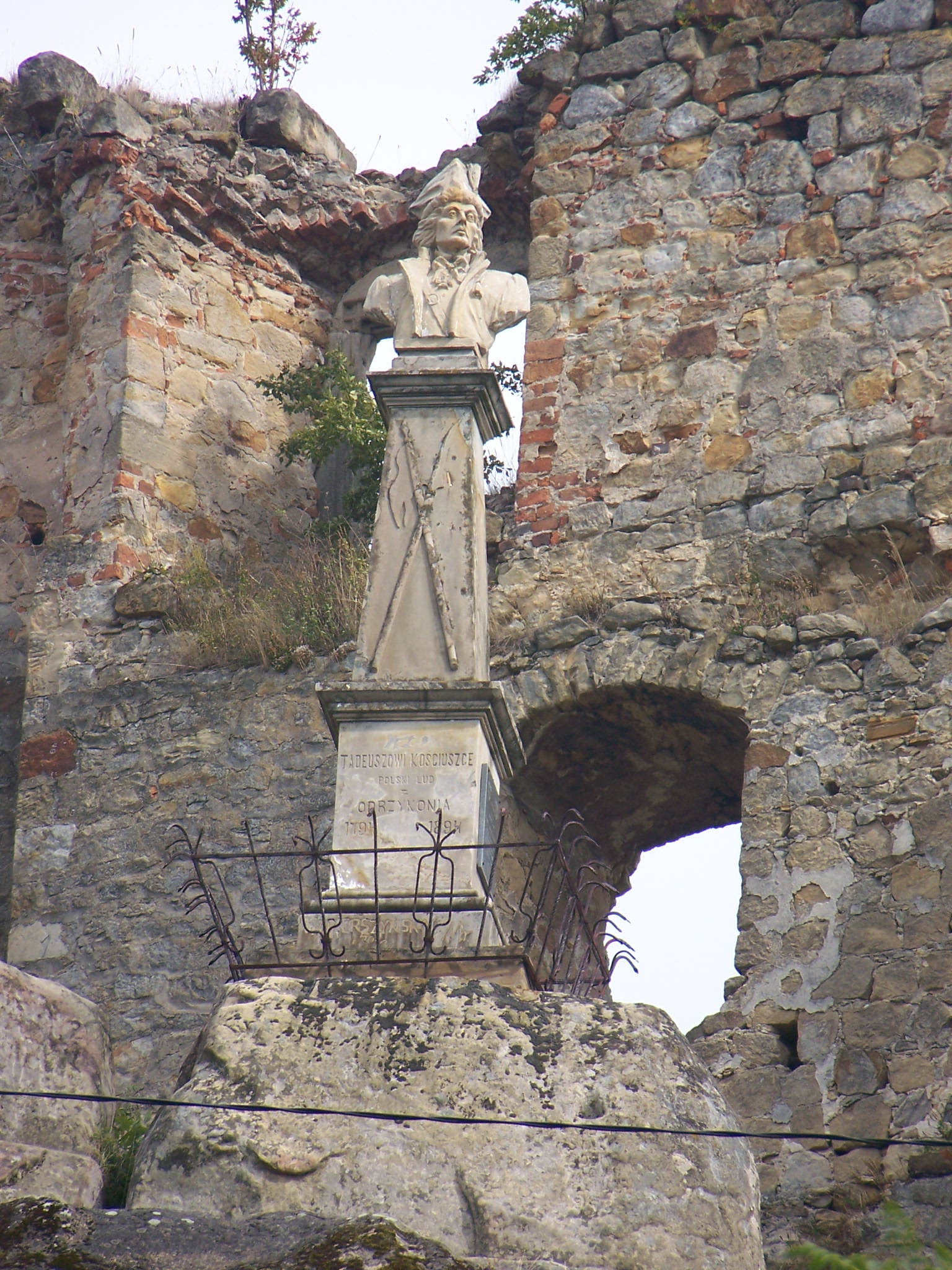
Tadeusz Kościuszko monument, 1894
