= Kamieniec Castle =

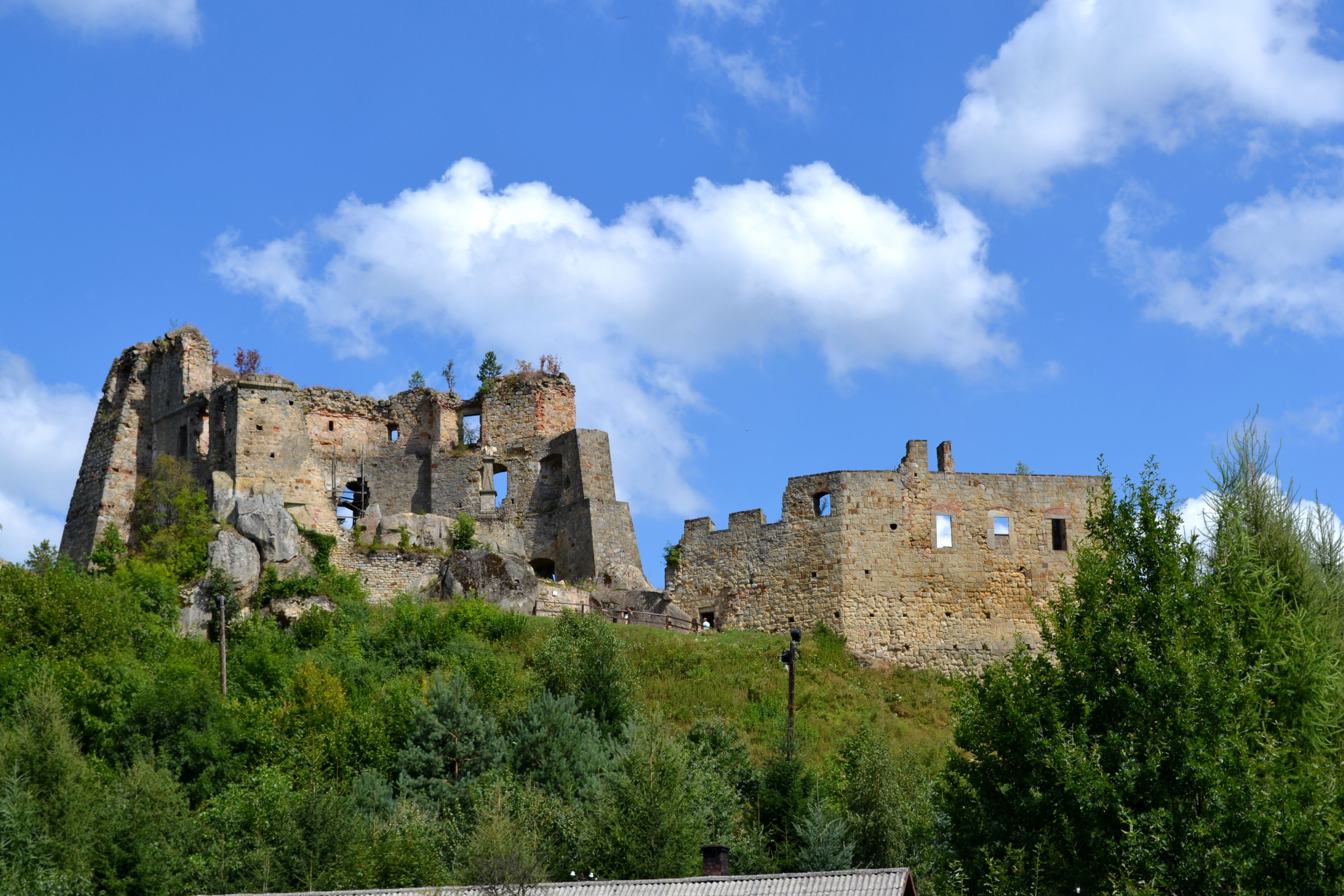
- Kamieniec Castle

- Location of the Kamieniec Castle in Poland
- 49°44′33″N 21°47′10″E
- Location: Korczyna-Odrzykoń borderlands, Podkarpackie Voivodeship, in Poland

History
- Built: 1348

Site notes
- Architectural style: Gothic

Kamieniec Castle is a 14th-century Gothic castle ruin, which was expanded in the 16th century in a Renaissance form. The fortress is located on the borderlands between Korczyna and Odrzykoń in Krosno County, Podkarpackie Voivodeship, Poland.

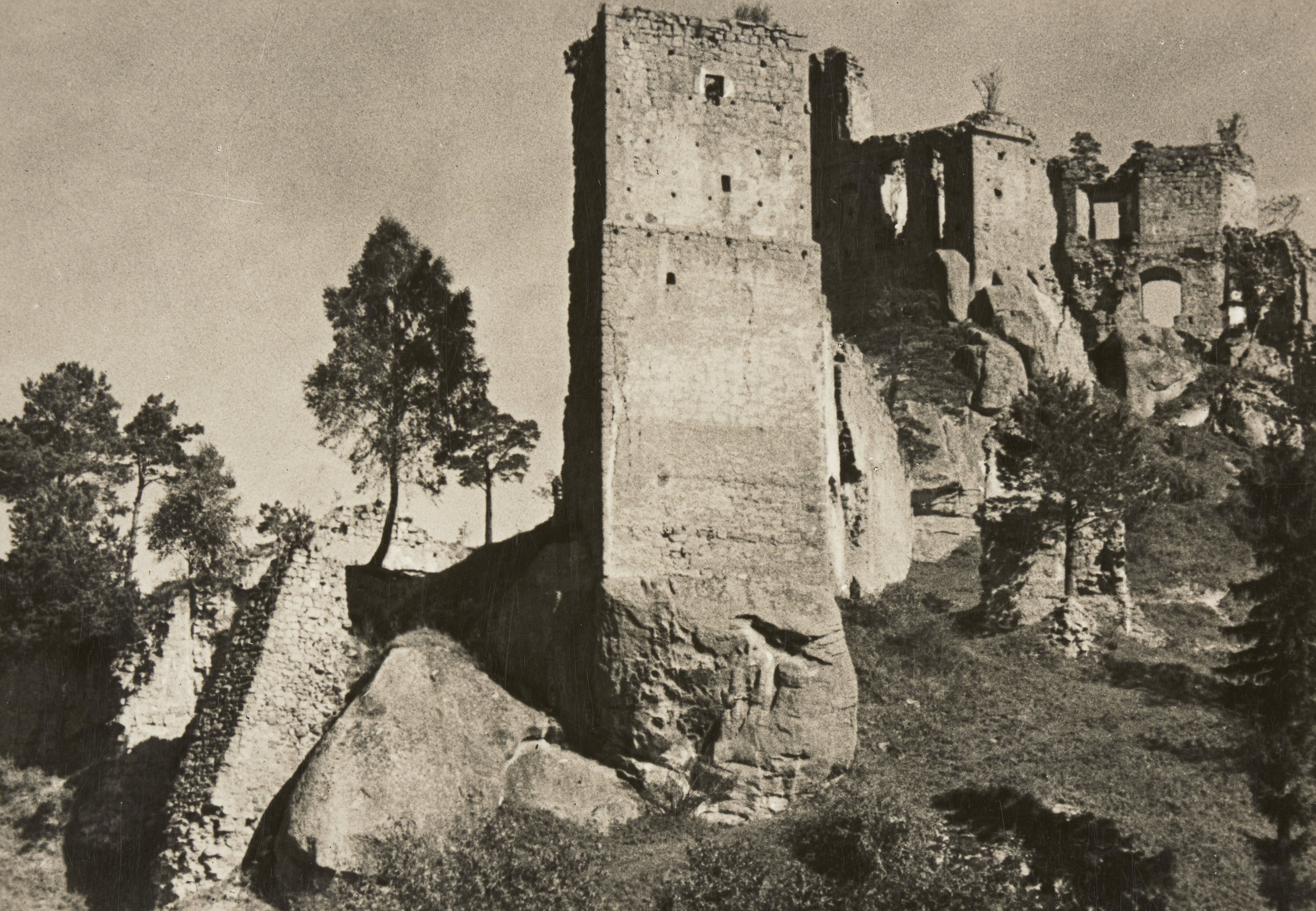
Castle ruins, 1938

== See also ==
- Korczyna
- Odrzykoń
- Castles in Poland
