= The Revenge (Fredro play) =

Polish comedy by Aleksander Fredro

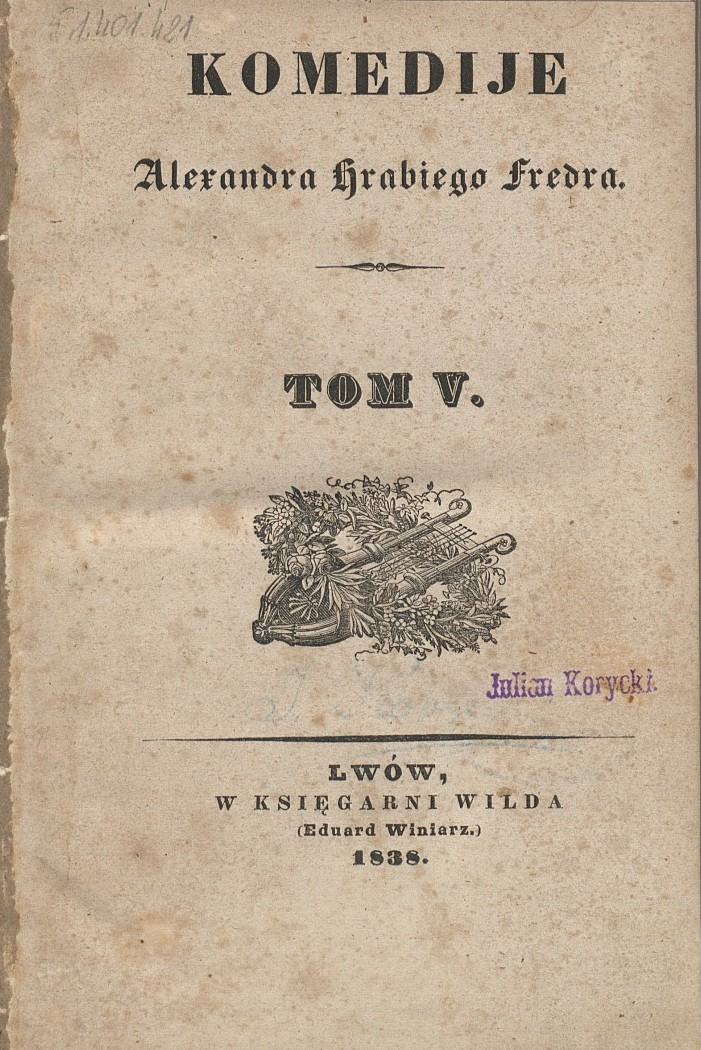
- First edition, 1838
- Original language: Polish
- Written by: Aleksander Fredro
- Genre: comedy
- Setting: Odrzykoń, Poland

Premiere
- Date: 1834
- Place: Lwów

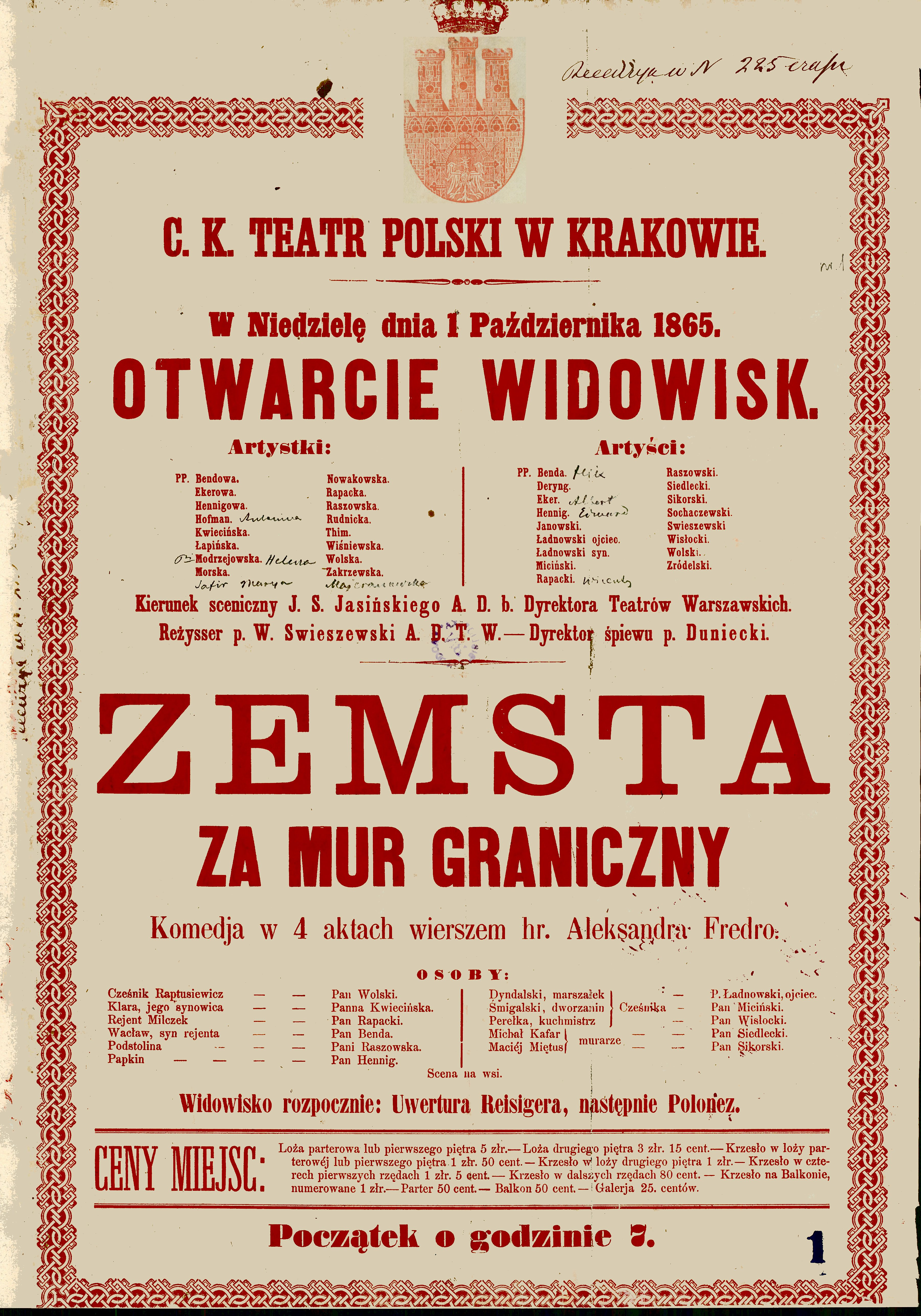
Theatrical poster for Zemsta, 1865

The Revenge (Polish: Zemsta) is a Polish comedy by Aleksander Fredro, a Polish poet, playwright and author active during Polish Romanticism in the period of partitions. Zemsta belongs to the canon of Polish literature. It is a play in four acts, written in the octosyllabic verse mostly in the vernacular of Lesser Poland (Małopolska); filled with proverbs and paraphrased allusions.

== Background ==
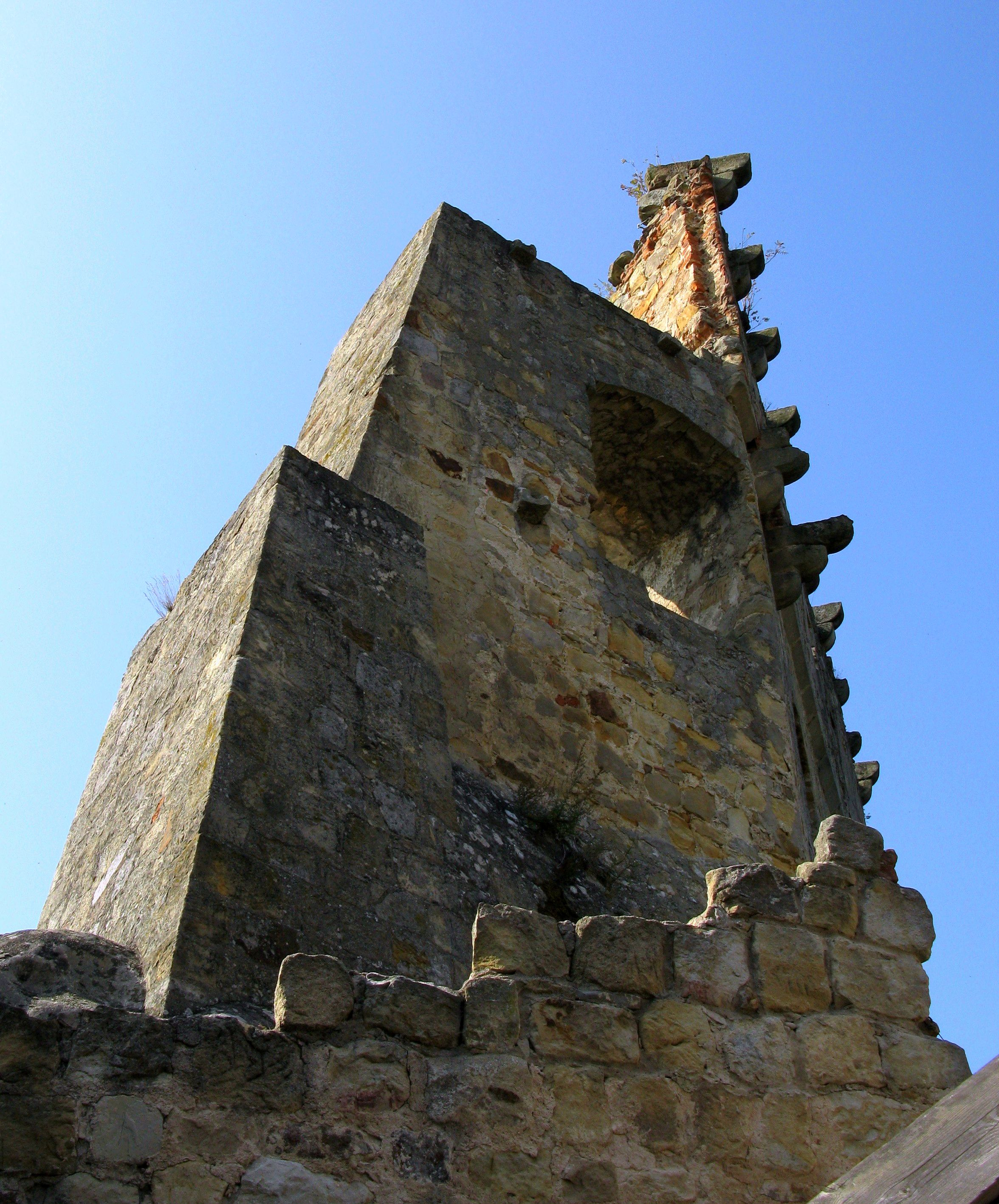
Ruins of Kamieniec Castle in Odrzykoń

Real events inspired Fredro to write the play. In November 1828, Fredro married Zofia Jablonowska, whose dowry included the title to half of a castle located in Odrzykoń in the province of Galicia. In 1829, when looking through the archives of the castle, Fredro came across some old court records related to a dispute dating from the 17th century between the owners of the castle's two halves - Jan Skotnicki and Piotr Firlej. The conflict was long and relentless. It ended after more than thirty years with the marriage of Firlej's son to Zofia Skotnicka, an end similar to that adopted by Fredro in his play.

The play premiered in Lwów on 17 February 1834, with Jan Nepomucen Nowakowski playing Cześnik and Witalis Smochowski playing Rejent.

== Plot ==
=== Act I ===
Two families live in two different castles – Cześnik Raptusiewicz and his niece Klara as well as Rejent Milczek and his son Wacław. Cześnik and Rejent consider each other enemies and do not get on. Cześnik, who administers Klara's lands until she comes of age, is eager to marry a wealthy wife. After a brief consideration of Klara, he settles on the widow Hanna, thinking that she is richer. Although generally of a forthright and brave characters, Cześnik is shy around women, and so sends Papkin, a show-off, to propose to Hanna (called Podstolina because she is the widow of a civil servant) and to be a go-between with Rejent for him. Podstolina herself is looking for a husband because her supposed wealth is only temporary – she is administering it for Klara, her kinswoman, and so agrees to marry Cześnik.

Rejent has hired some bricklayers to fix a wall that segregates his part of the castle from the half of the castle in which Cześnik lives. Cześnik does not approve of this and sends Papkin to shoo them away, offering them however payment for their work being interrupted.

Klara, niece of Cześnik, and Wacław, son of Rejent are in love and secretly meeting up. They despair of ever being allowed to marry due to their families' dislike of each other. Wacław proposes that they run away together, but Klara refuses. In order to be close to her, Wacław presents himself as an employee of the Rejent and gives himself up as a hostage to Papkin, supposedly caught up in the struggle over the wall.

=== Act II ===
Wacław makes an unsuccessful attempt to convince Cześnik to reconcile with his father. Cześnik declares that it would sooner come about that the sun would stop in place and the water dry out of the seas than he and Rejent would have peace. Wacław bribes Papkin to let him stay and agrees with Klara to convince Podstolina, just that day engaged to Cześnik, to intervene on their behalf. When Wacław meets with Podstolina, it turns out that she is a former lover of Wacław, to whom he had presented himself untruthfully as a prince. Despite this, Podstolina decides that she prefers Wacław to Cześnik.

Papkin declares his love for Klara. Klara, who does not love him, demands impossible things of him as 'proof' of his sentiments – to spend half a year in silence, to survive on bread and water for just over a year, and to bring her a crocodile.

Cześnik wants to duel with Rejent and sends Papkin over to arrange this.

=== Act III ===
Rejent Milczek prepares to raise a legal action against Cześnik. He convinces the bricklayers that the very minor scratches that they suffered count as wounds and that they have been deprived of work (because he himself will not pay them). Wacław comes to ask him to allow him to marry Klara. Instead, Rejent announces that he must marry Podstolina, providing an agreement that whichever one of them breaks it off will have to pay the other 100 thousand.

Papkin arrives with a letter from Cześnik inviting Rejent for a duel. Papkin drinks some wine he criticises. Although he starts off bragging, deceived by Rejent's unassuming manner, he begins to be greatly afraid and can barely issue the challenge, after being threatened with being thrown out of the window and the placement of four servants outside the door. Podstolina comes in with the agreement of marriage to Wacław, which she has signed. Papkin finds out that she has jilted Cześnik. Papkin gets thrown down the stairs.

=== Act IV ===
Papkin comes back from Rejent and brags about his courage. Cześnik suggests that the wine he drank was poisoned. Papkin falls into a panic and, thinking himself poisoned, writes his testament. Cześnik is informed of Podstolina's change of mind. He dictates a letter to Dyndalski that is supposed to come from Klara, but eventually decides to send a servant for him instead. Wacław arrives and is given the choice between being imprisoned or marrying Klara. Wacław and Klara are surprised but happy and get married: a priest is already waiting in the chapel.

Rejent comes to Cześnik. He had turned up at the place Cześnik had set up for the appointed duel, but Cześnik himself did not turn up. He is angry to hear of Wacław's marriage to Klara. Podstolina explains that all her wealth is in fact Klara's and by virtue of her marriage is given over to Klara. Klara promises to pay 100 thousand to Podstolina out of her own money. Rejent and Cześnik reconcile.

== Characters ==
- Cześnik Maciej Raptusiewicz - uncle of Klara, administrator of half of the castle, hates Rejent
- Rejent Milczek - owner of the other half of the castle, hates Cześnik
- Klara Raptusiewiczówna - niece of Cześnik, owner of half of the castle, loves Wacław
- Józef Papkin - poor nobleman serving Cześnik, wants to marry Klara
- Wacław Milczek - son of Rejent, loves Klara
- Podstolina Hanna Czepiersińska - widow, briefly Cześnik's fiancée, former lover of Wacław, relation of Klara
- Dyndalski - servant of Cześnik
- Perełka - Cześnik's cook
- Bricklayers

== Adaptation ==
The play serves as the basis for the opera Zemsta za mur graniczny (Revenge for the Boundary Wall) by Zygmunt Noskowski.

The play was adapted into a 2002 film, directed by Andrzej Wajda, featuring Janusz Gajos (as Cześnik), Andrzej Seweryn (as Rejent Milczek), Roman Polanski (as Papkin) and Katarzyna Figura (as Podstolina) among others. Notably, the original story took place in Kamieniec castle, which is currently located in Odrzykoń, while the movie was filmed in Ogrodzieniec castle, located in Silesia province, Poland.
