= Korczyna, Lesser Poland Voivodeship =

Korczyna
- Village
- Location within Poland
- Coordinates: 49°42′N 21°15′E
- Country: Poland
- Voivodeship: Lesser Poland
- County: Gorlice
- Gmina: Biecz
- Population: 960

Korczyna [kɔrˈt͡ʂɨna] is a village in the administrative district of Gmina Biecz, within Gorlice County, Lesser Poland Voivodeship, in southern Poland.

== See also ==
- Walddeutsche
