= Aleksander Fredro =

Polish writer (1793–1876)

Count Aleksander Fredro
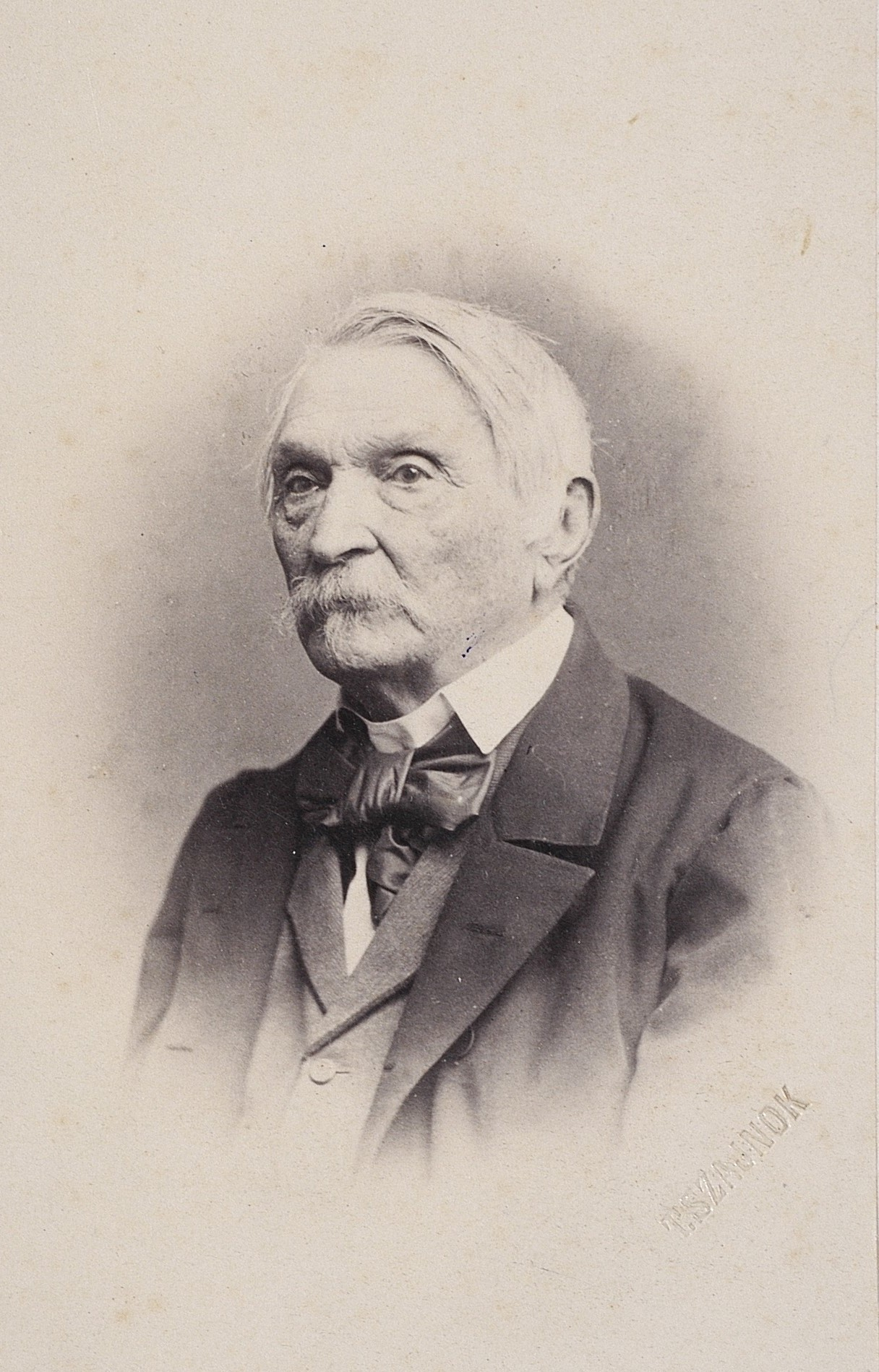
- An 1870 photograph of Fredro
- Born: 20 June 1793; Surochów near Jarosław
- Died: 15 July 1876 (aged 83); Lwów
- Writing career
- Language: Polish
- Notable works: Zemsta (The Revenge), Damy i Huzary, Zapiski starucha

Aleksander Fredro (20 June 1793 – 15 July 1876) was a Polish poet, playwright and author active during Polish Romanticism in the period of partitions by neighboring empires. His works including plays written in the octosyllabic verse (Zemsta) and in prose (Damy i Huzary) as well as fables, belong to the canon of Polish literature. Fredro was harshly criticized by some of his contemporaries for light-hearted humor or even alleged immorality (Seweryn Goszczyński, 1835) which led to years of his literary silence. Many of Fredro's dozens of plays were published and popularized only after his death. His best-known works have been translated into English, French, German, Russian, Czech, Romanian, Hungarian and Slovak.

== Biography ==
Count Aleksander Fredro, of the Bończa coat of arms, was born in the village of Surochów near Jarosław, then a crown territory of Austria. He was the son of a landowner, Fredro was homeschooled during his younger years at his family's residence in where they hired private tutors. He entered the Polish army at age 16 and saw action in the Napoleonic wars, including the Moscow campaign. His memoir Topsy Turvy Talk, which echoes the style of Laurence Sterne's Tristram Shandy, recounts his military experiences during Bonaparte's last campaign. While in France in 1814, he took an active interest in French drama. After leaving the army he settled on his estate and began as a writer.

Fredro made his literary debut in 1817, but he was not interested in the problems of Romanticism. His first work was „Mąż i żona”. He wrote social comedies about the lifestyle of the Polish nobility and is known for his skill in characterization and plot, as well as the flexibility of his language. His work also features humor typical of folk theatre from the Romantic period, and a fast-paced farce with varying degrees of sophistication.

Two of Fredro's fables, The Monkey in the Bath (Małpa w kąpieli) and Paul and Gawel (Paweł i Gaweł), belong to the most popular children's stories in the country. His best-known comedy, Zemsta (The Revenge), was adapted for the screen in Poland by eminent film director Andrzej Wajda in 2002.

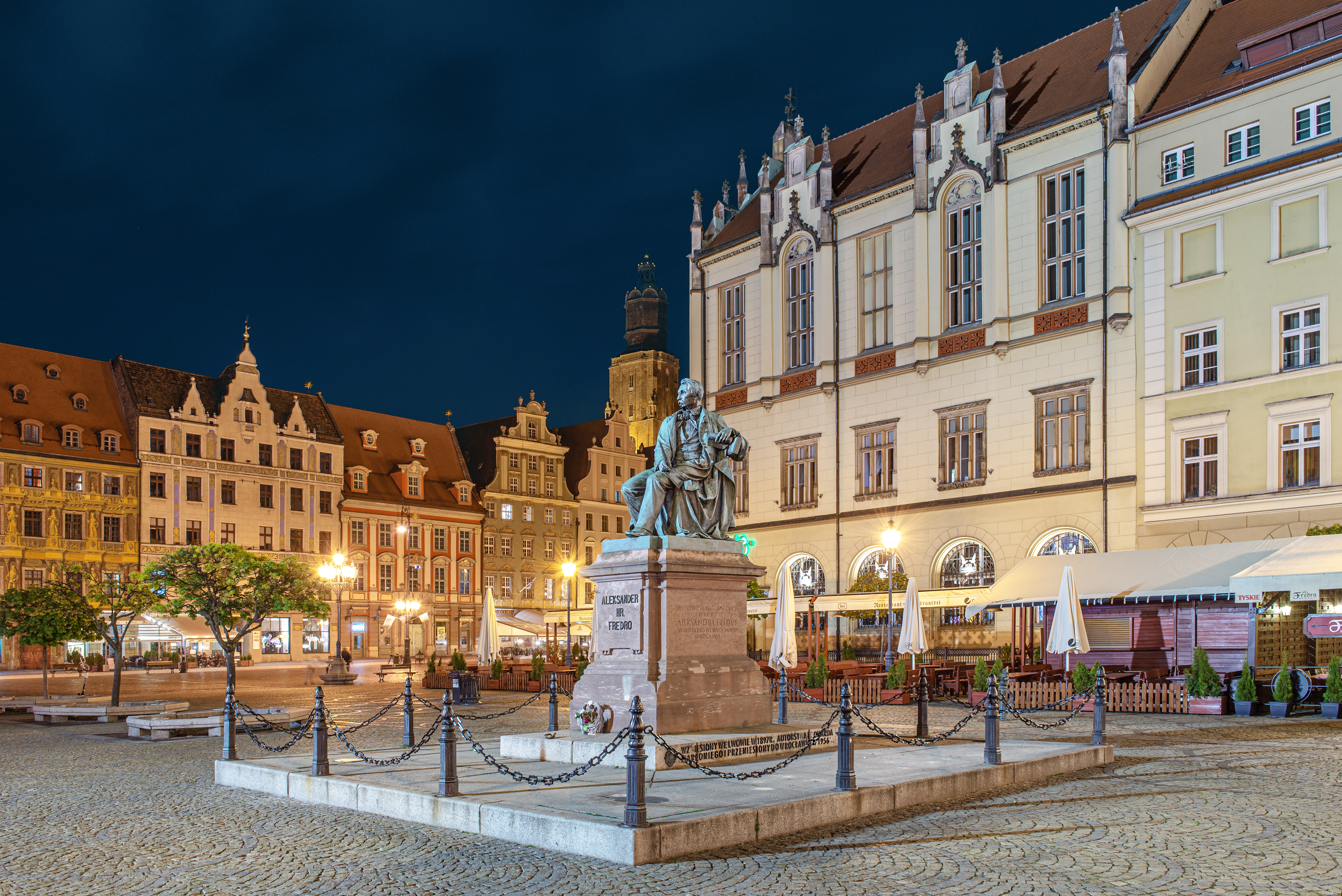
Aleksander Fredro Monument, moved from Lviv (Ukraine) to Wrocław (Poland) after World War II

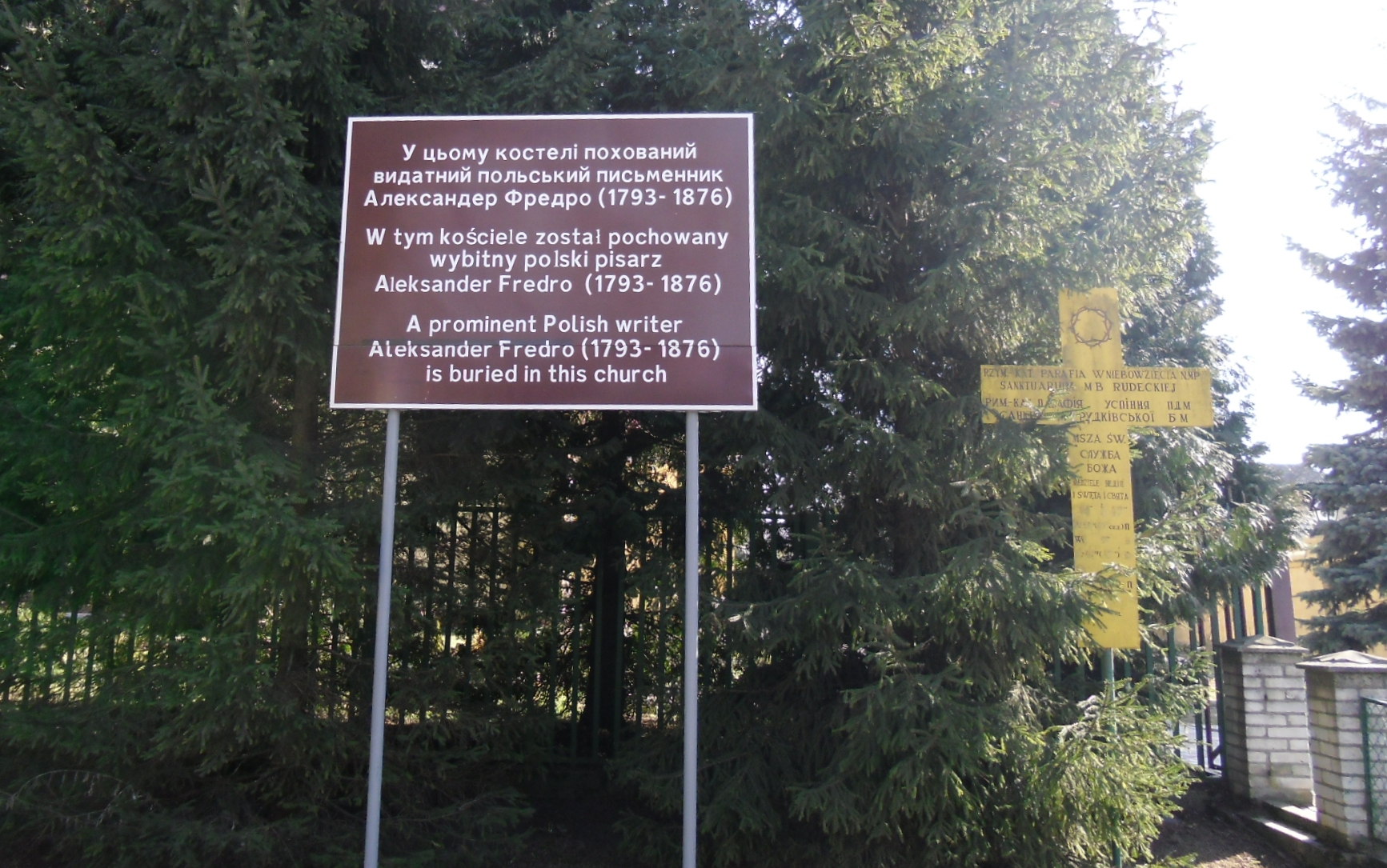
Memorial plaque to Alexander Fredro (1793-1876) at the Roman Catholic Church of the Assumption in Rudky

Fredro was the maternal grandfather of the head of the Ukrainian Catholic Church, Metropolitan Andrey Sheptytsky. He was commemorated on a Polish postage stamp issued in 1978.

He died on 15 July 1876 in Lwów and was buried in a family grave in Catholic Church of the Assumption of Rudky.

== Comedies ==
- Mr. Geldhab (Pan Geldhab, written in 1818 and first performed in 1821)
- Man and Wife (Mąż i żona, performed 1812 or 1822)
- Ladies and Husars (Damy i Huzary, written in 1825)
- Mr. Jovial (Pan Jowialski, written and performed in 1832)
- Maidens' Vows, or the Magnetism of the Heart (Śluby panieńskie, czyli magnetyzm serca, performed 1833)
- The Revenge (Zemsta, written in 1833, first performed in 1834)
- The Annuity (Dożywocie, written and performed in 1835)
