= August Cieszkowski Street, Bydgoszcz =

Street in Poland

Coordinates: 53.1310°N 18.0065°E

August Cieszkowski Street
Bydgoszcz
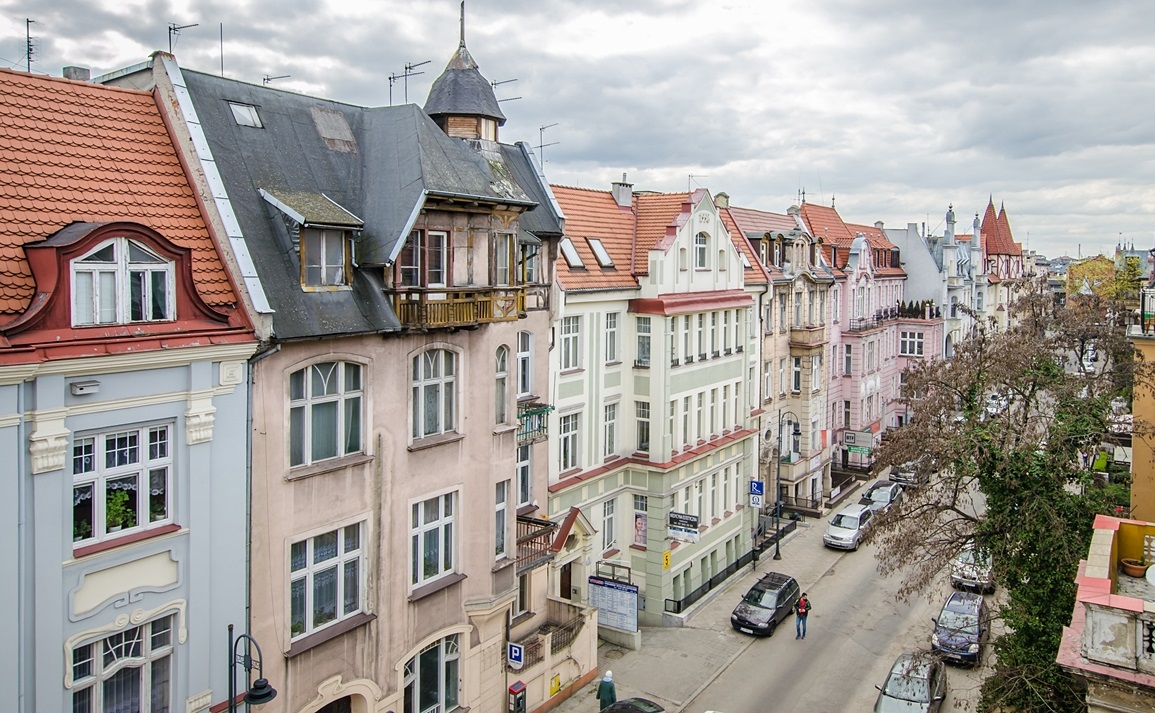
- View of a frontage
- Interactive map of August Cieszkowski Street
- Native name: Ulica Augusta Cieszkowskiego w Bydgoszczy (Polish)
- Former name: Moltkestraße (from Helmuth von Moltke the Elder)
- Namesake: August Cieszkowski
- Owner: City of Bydgoszcz
- Length: 250 m (820 ft)
- Location: Bydgoszcz, Poland

August Cieszkowski Street is a residential street in Bydgoszcz, noted for its cohesive ensemble of Art Nouveau and Fin de siècle tenement houses dating from the late 19th- and early 20th centuries. Most of which are registered on Kuyavian-Pomeranian Voivodeship Heritage register.

== Location ==
The street is located in the middle Downtown district in Bydgoszcz, connecting on a southeast - northwest axis Gdańska Street to Pomorska Street. At its south-eastern end stands an Evangelical Methodist Church, and its opposite tip aims at the so-called Bydgoszcz Musical District.

== History ==
The establishment of the street is associated with the dynamic development of the city in the second half of the 19th century. The location of Bydgoszcz Main train station, away from the current center of Bydgoszcz in 1851, eased the urban expansion of the city to the north and north-west. After the construction of new quarters along Gdańska Street, Dworcowa Street and Pomorska Street, another expansion phase occurred among perpendicular short side streets. 1894 is the first date referring to Moltkestraße, today's Cieszkowski Street, with its lavish buildings erected during economic boom and the consequent revival of construction activity in Bydgoszcz. New frontages were built on a grand scale, using the nascent Art Nouveau design. Special attention has been given at the time to street equipment praised by the local establishment: paving, wide sidewalks with granite, street lighting (gas, then electrical after 1900).

Buildings have been completed within a decade, making August Cieszkowski street a place gathering luxurious tenement houses designed by renowned architects in Bydgoszcz:

- Karl Bergner;
- Józef Święcicki;
- Paul Böhm;
- Carl Meyer;
- Rudolf Kern,
- Fritz Weidner.

Frontages present a variety of stylistic trends, both traditional (Neo-Renaissance, Neo-Baroque) and avant-garde (Historicism, Secession, Modernism).

First houses were completed in 1897, but most of the construction work took place between 1900 and 1903. In 1904, the road had already received a full equipment: forged fences along the northern frontage, pavement including porphyry, walkways, sewer system and gas street lighting. Among residents and landlords -during both the Prussian period (till 1920) and the interwar- were senior officials, merchants, businessmen, teachers and officers.

After 1990, most of the street buildings have undergone repair and restoration. Since 2008 the "August Cieszkowski Street Residents Association" organizes its annual festival "U-Rodziny Augusta Cieszkowskiego" (In the Family of August Cieszkowski), promoting cultural integration and bringing street residents and tourists. In 2011, the municipal council decided, as part of the revitalization plans, to build a parallel street, "Nowomazowieckiej St.", which should relieve the heavy traffic transit in Cieszkowski Street.

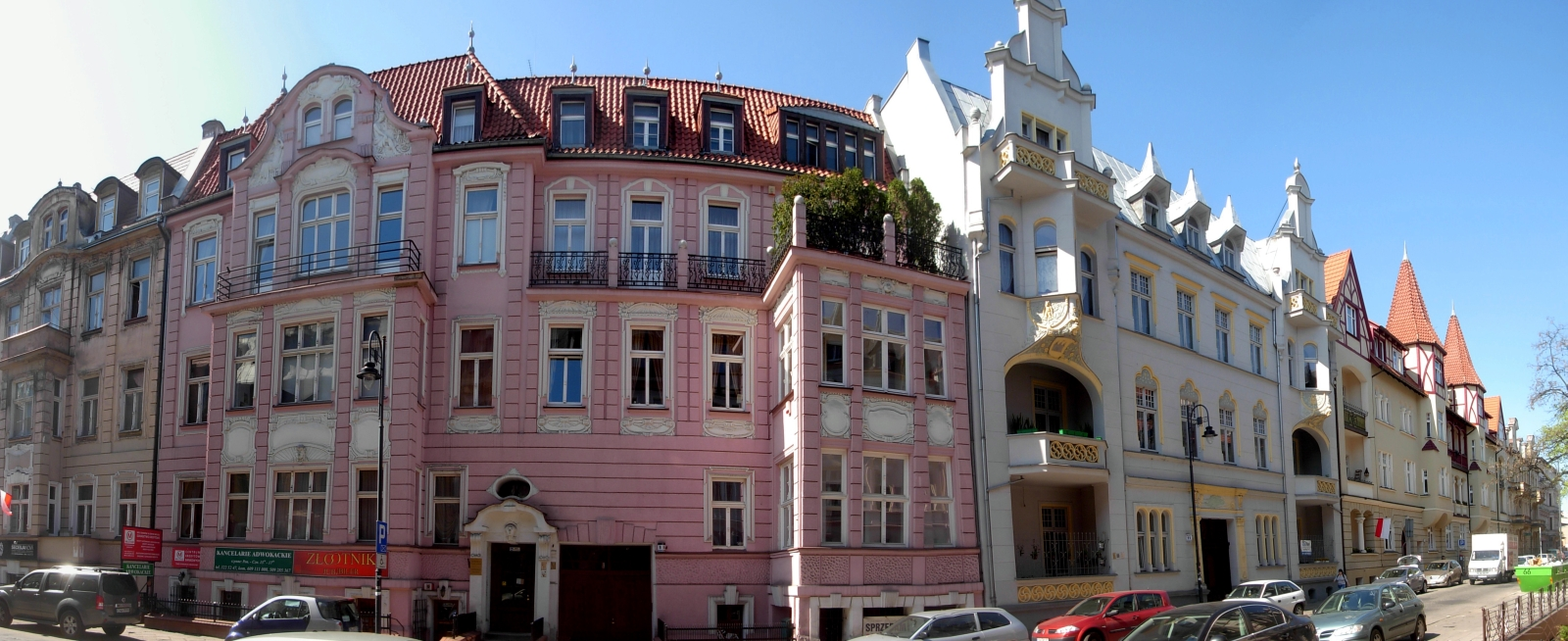
Panorama view on southern frontages

== Architecture ==
August Cieszkowski Street is considered as a showcase of architecture in downtown Bydgoszcz, exalting the style and spirit of Belle Époque. Street frontages are an example of the coexistence of classical forms with avant-garde style. Facades have been designed by the elite architects in Bydgoszcz in the late 19th and early 20th century, including:

- Józef Święcicki, his projects are based on Eclecticism, combining dominant forms and historizing elements (Neo-Renaissance, Neo-Baroque);
- Karl Bergner who designed Eclecticism styled houses with interspersed Art Nouveau details, as was done in Berlin;
- Fritz Weidner, Rudolf Kern and Paul Böhm were influenced by Historicism, and were following new, avant-garde, stylistic choices (Secession, elements of Modernism).

Oldest buildings are located at the intersections with Gdańska Street and Pomorska Street and display Eclecticism forms with details Neo-Renaissance and Neo-Baroque. In younger buildings, especially those erected after 1900, traditional stucco decorations on the facades are reduced to the benefit of enriching architectural forms. Buildings show asymmetrical facades, irregular shapes, with picturesque towers and merging bay windows. These forms are topped with magnificent gables, stressing the picturesque character. In all facades decoration appears stylized and simplified motives, in line with the new trends in art in the late 19th and early 20th century: acanthi, rococo details, Rose windows, herms and others. Most developed sculptural allegorical decorations on houses facades are geometric and floral ornaments, initials, cartouche symbols and carved figural sculptures. The symbolism used generally refers to the house as a "home", a place of peace and rest, and points out the passing and contemplation of life.

== Main places and buildings ==
=== Józef Święcicki's mural ===
In November 2018, the city of Bydgoszcz honored the memory of the architect by dedicating a mural to Józef Święcicki and his works, on a wall located at the corner of Gdańska and Cieszkowskiego streets, in front of his former house.

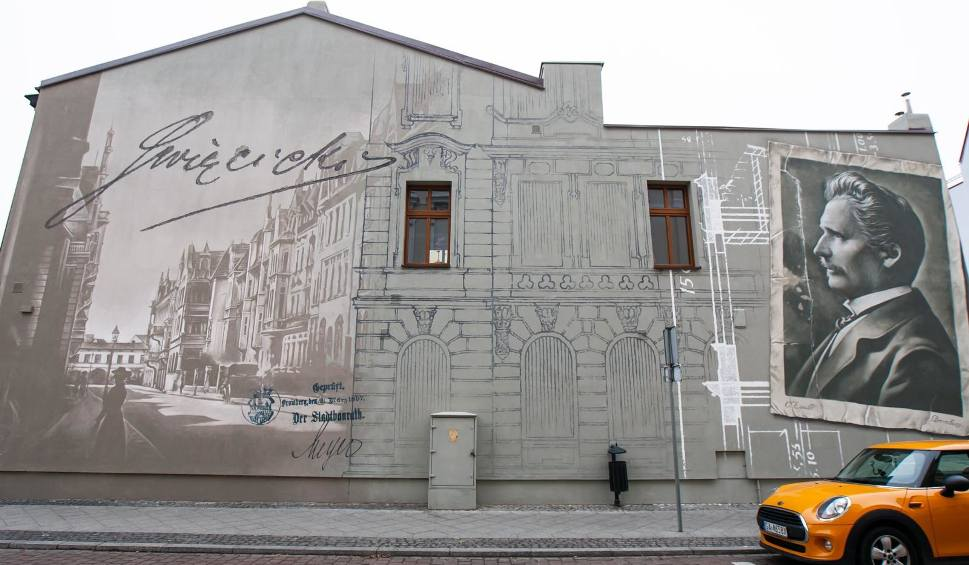
Święcicki's mural

=== House at 1 ===
Registered on Kuyavian-Pomeranian Voivodeship Heritage List, Nr.601268, Reg.A/1104 (18 October 1993)

1903–1904, by Paul Böhm

Art Nouveau

Construction costs exceeded the initial estimations (40,000 DM) and were covered by the architect who hoped to profit from the sale of the finished property. After completion, the tenement was acquired by rentier David Cohn. The address was then "MoltkeStrasse 21". After World War II, building elevation almost completely lost its adornement. Its original appearance has been reconstructed with restored architectural details during the renovation carried out in 1994.

The building has been designed in the spirit of Berlin Art Nouveau. It is a three-storey house, founded on "L" shape footprint. Indoor, a high Mansard roof and dormers protect the residential attic. Symmetrical front elevation is built with stylized Tuscan pilasters supporting a balcony. The ensemble is topped with an undulating gable including a large window opening decorated with stucco volutes of "Berlin" inspiration. Secession style is emphasized on the facade by volutes in the corners of the building, wavy plinth, wavy friezes and wavy uplift cornices.

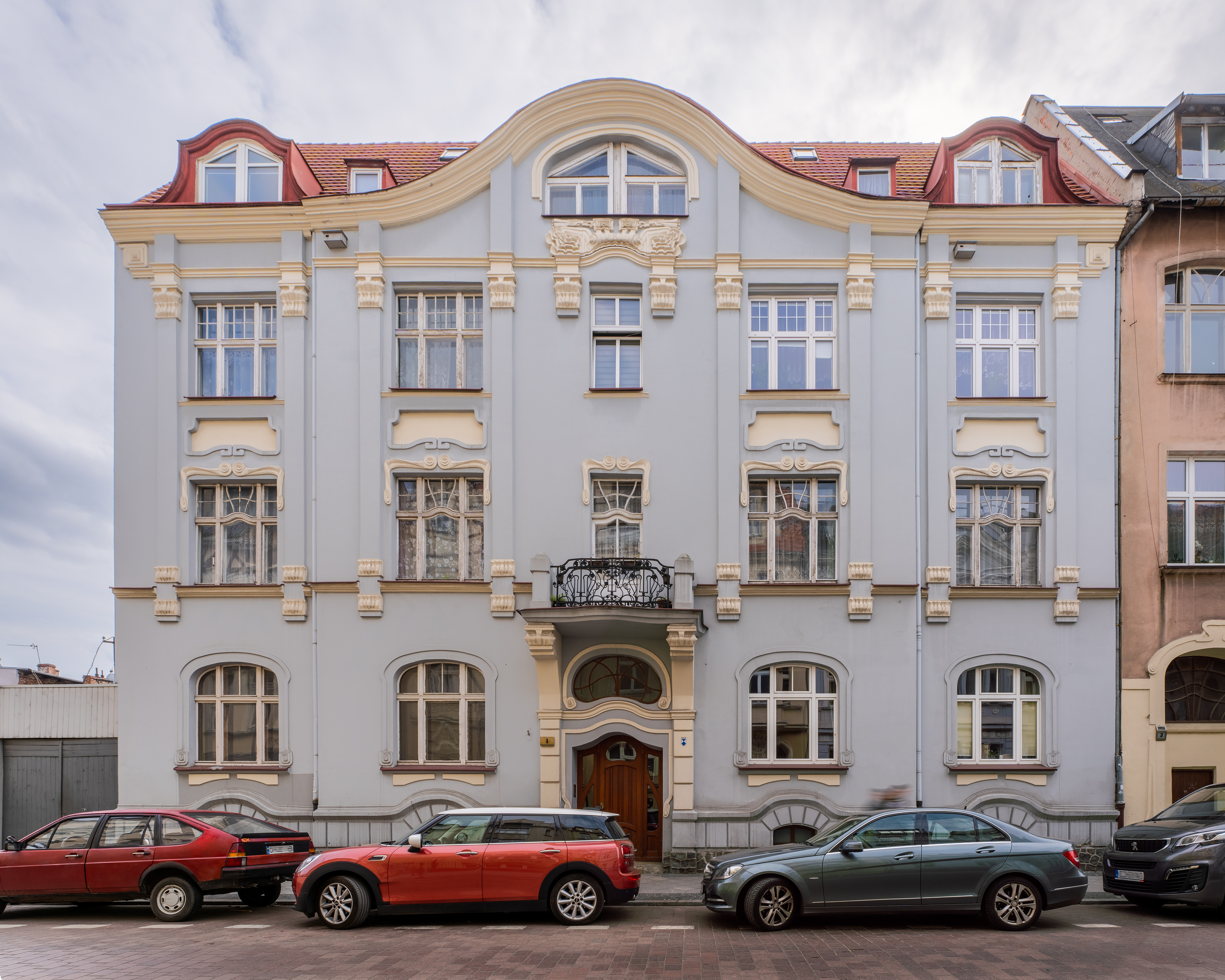
Main Elevation

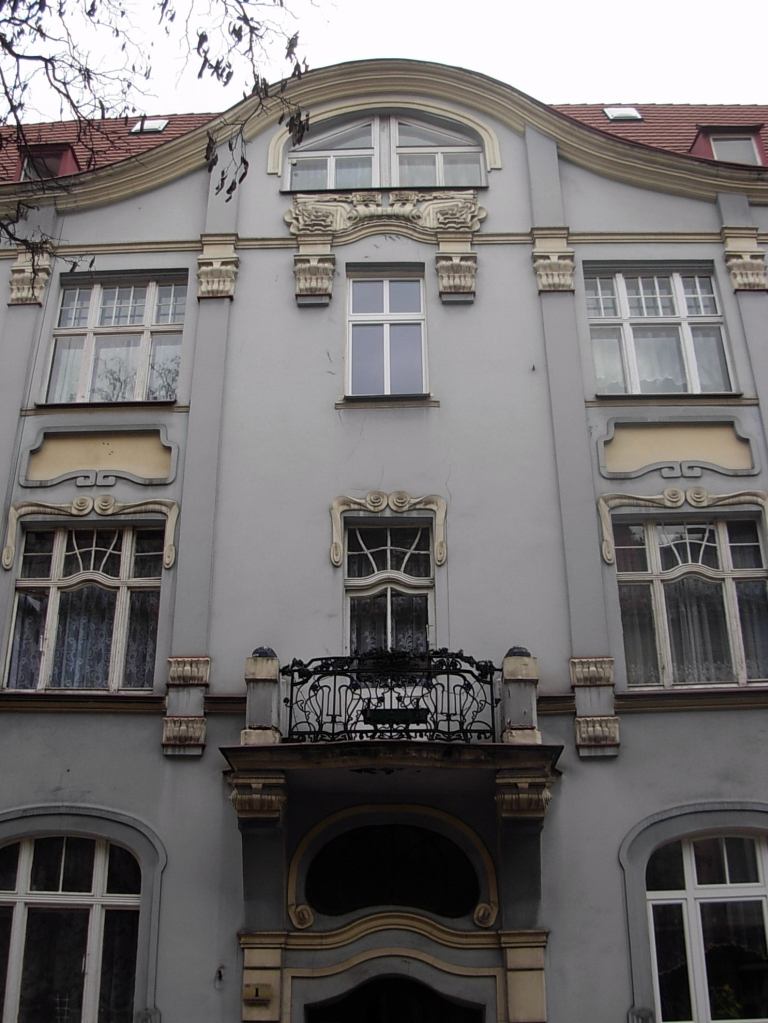
Upper frontage

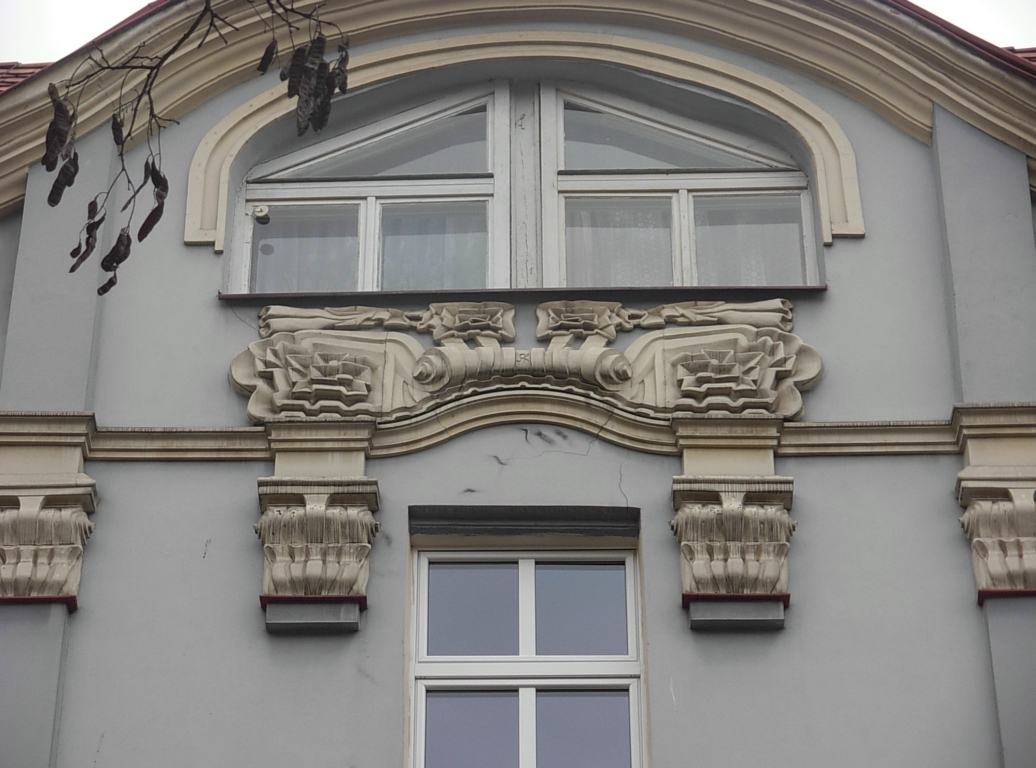
Volutes details

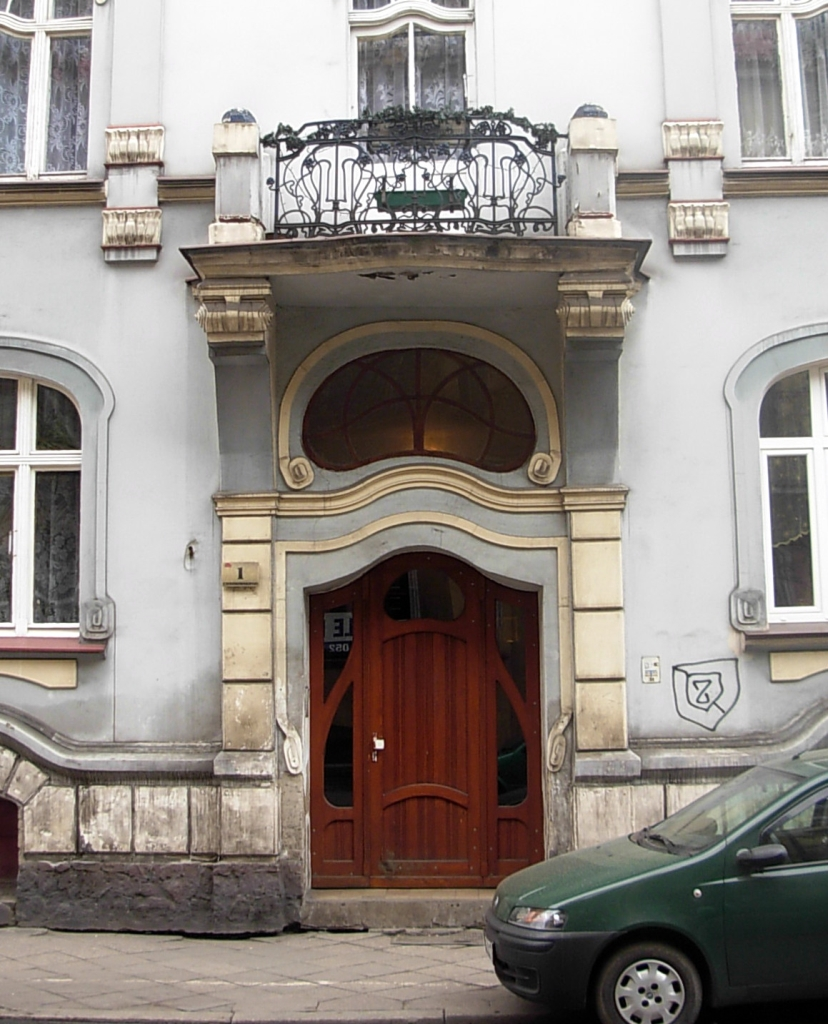
Gate and balcony

=== Józef Święcicki's tenement at 2, corner house with 63 Gdańska Street ===
Registered on Kuyavian-Pomeranian Voivodeship Heritage List, Nr.601309-Reg.A/1046 (25 May 1991)

House of architect Józef Święcicki, from where he ran his business.

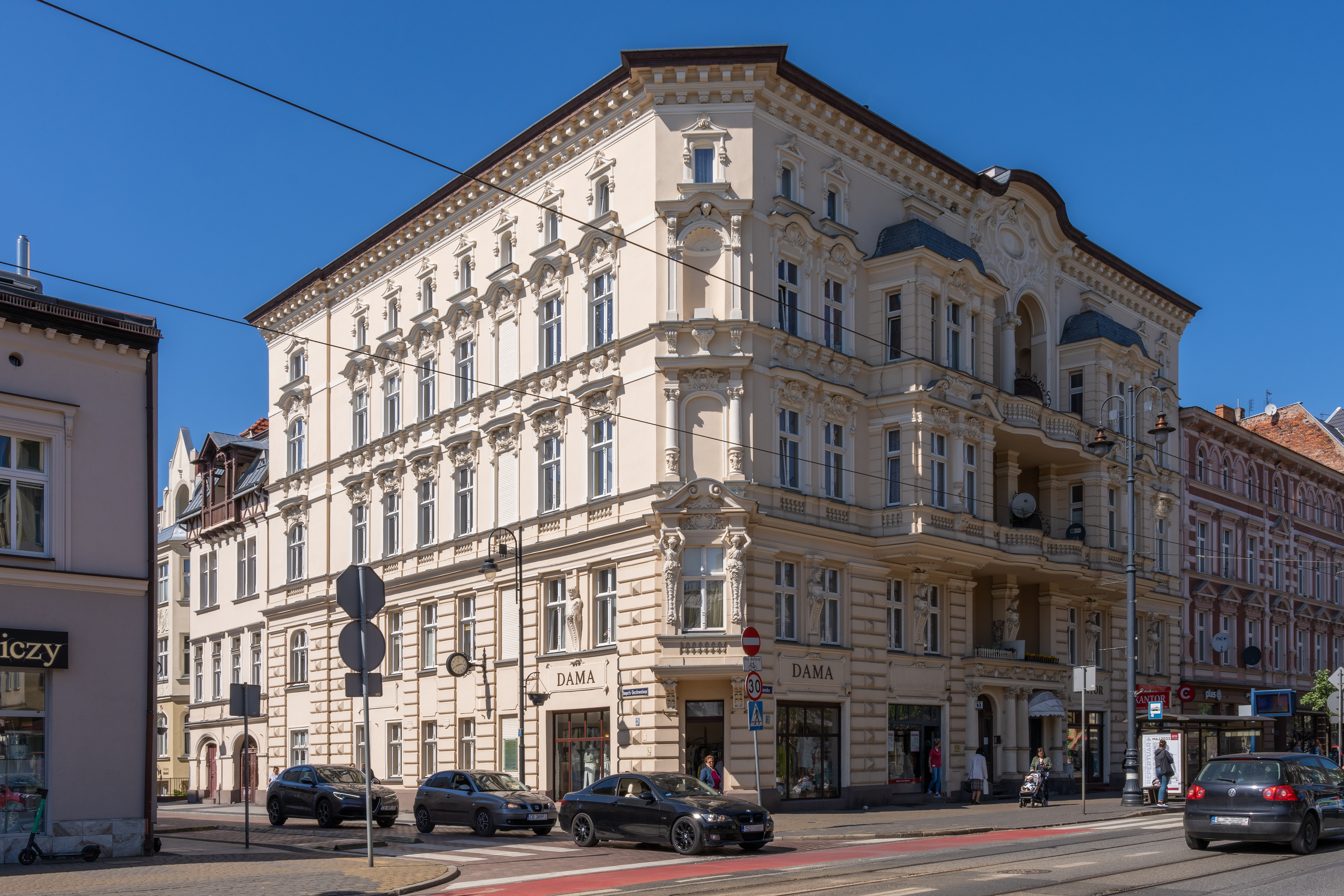
Main facades

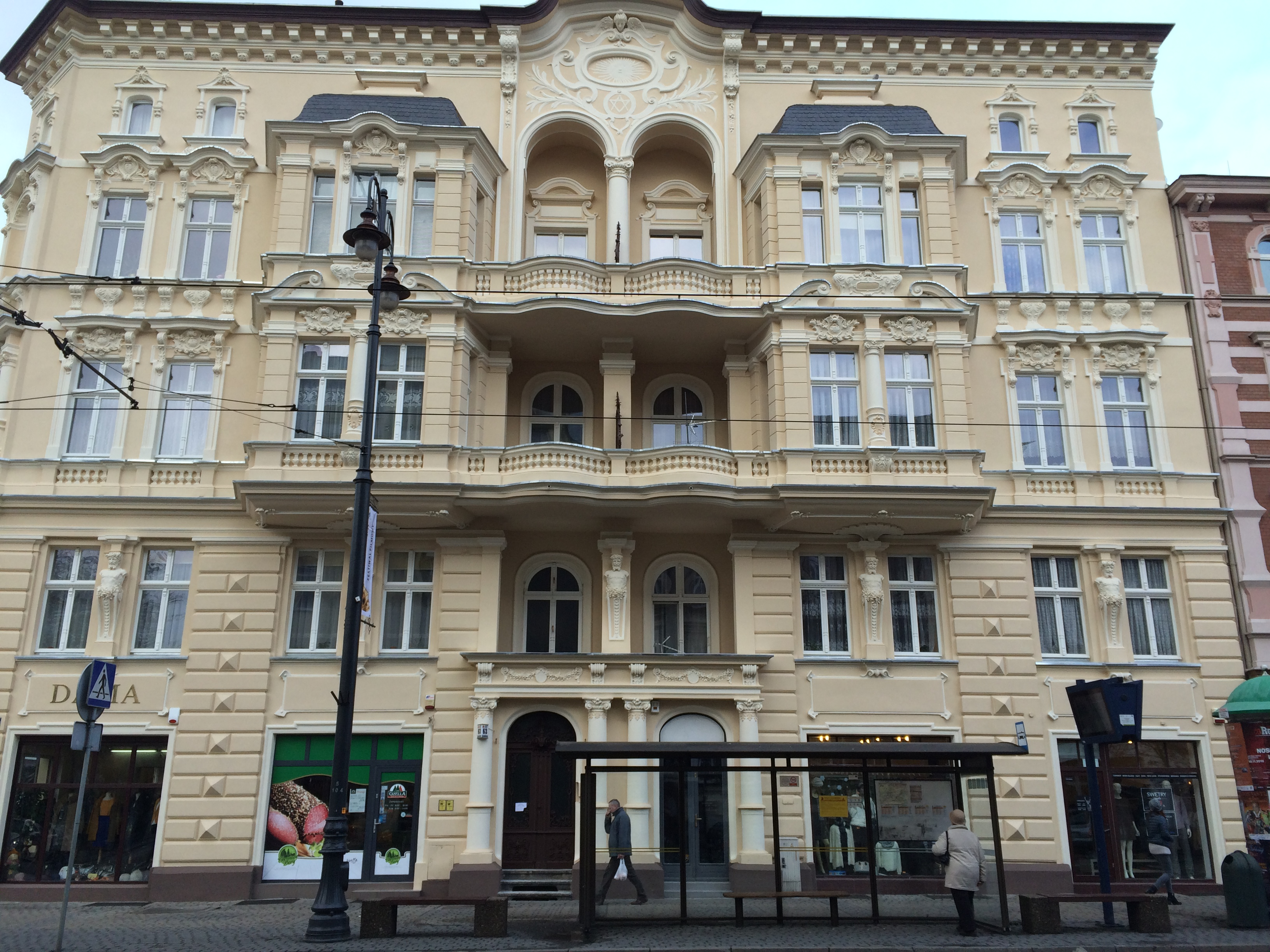
Facade from Gdańska Street

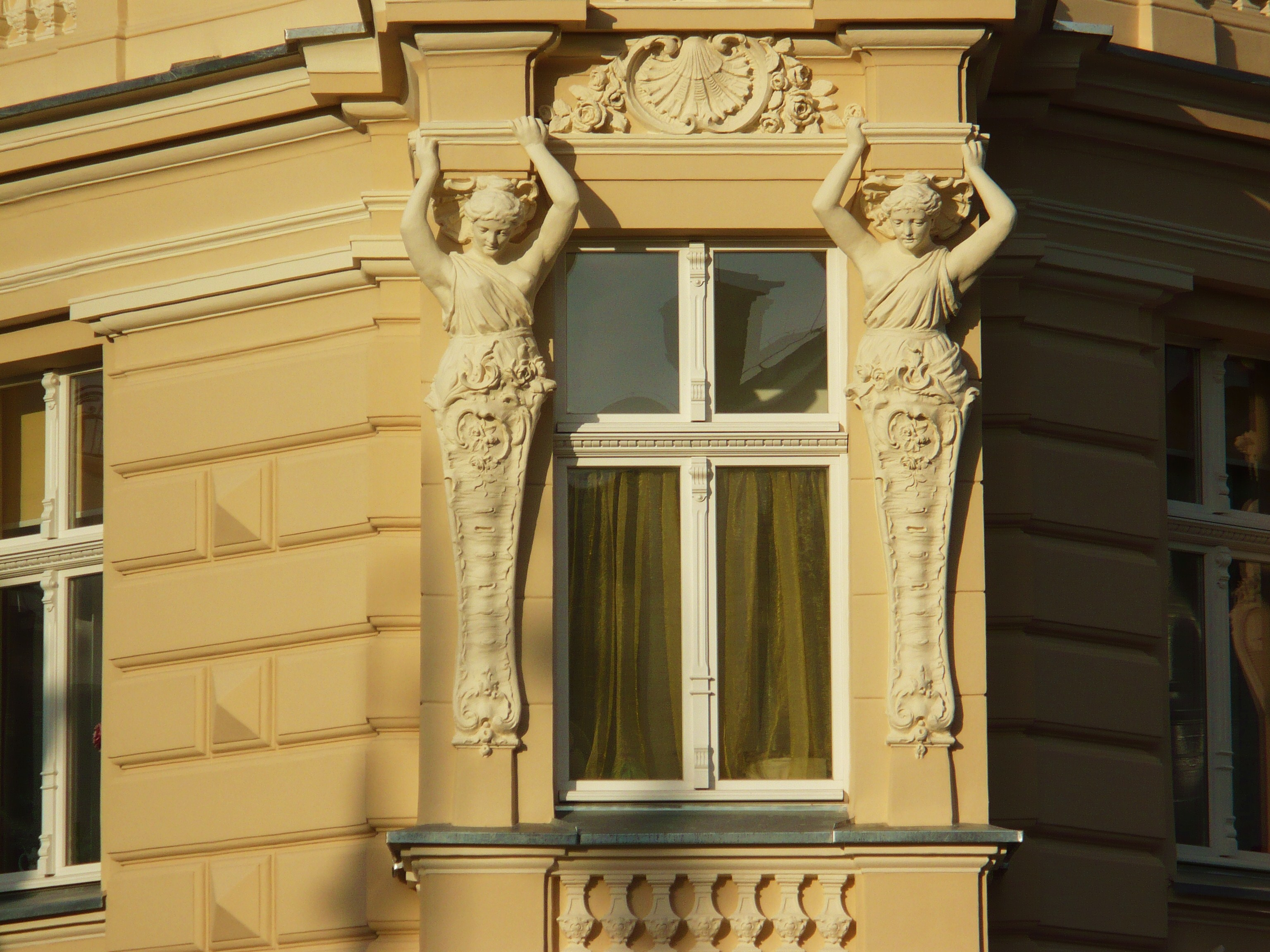
Caryatids on the corner

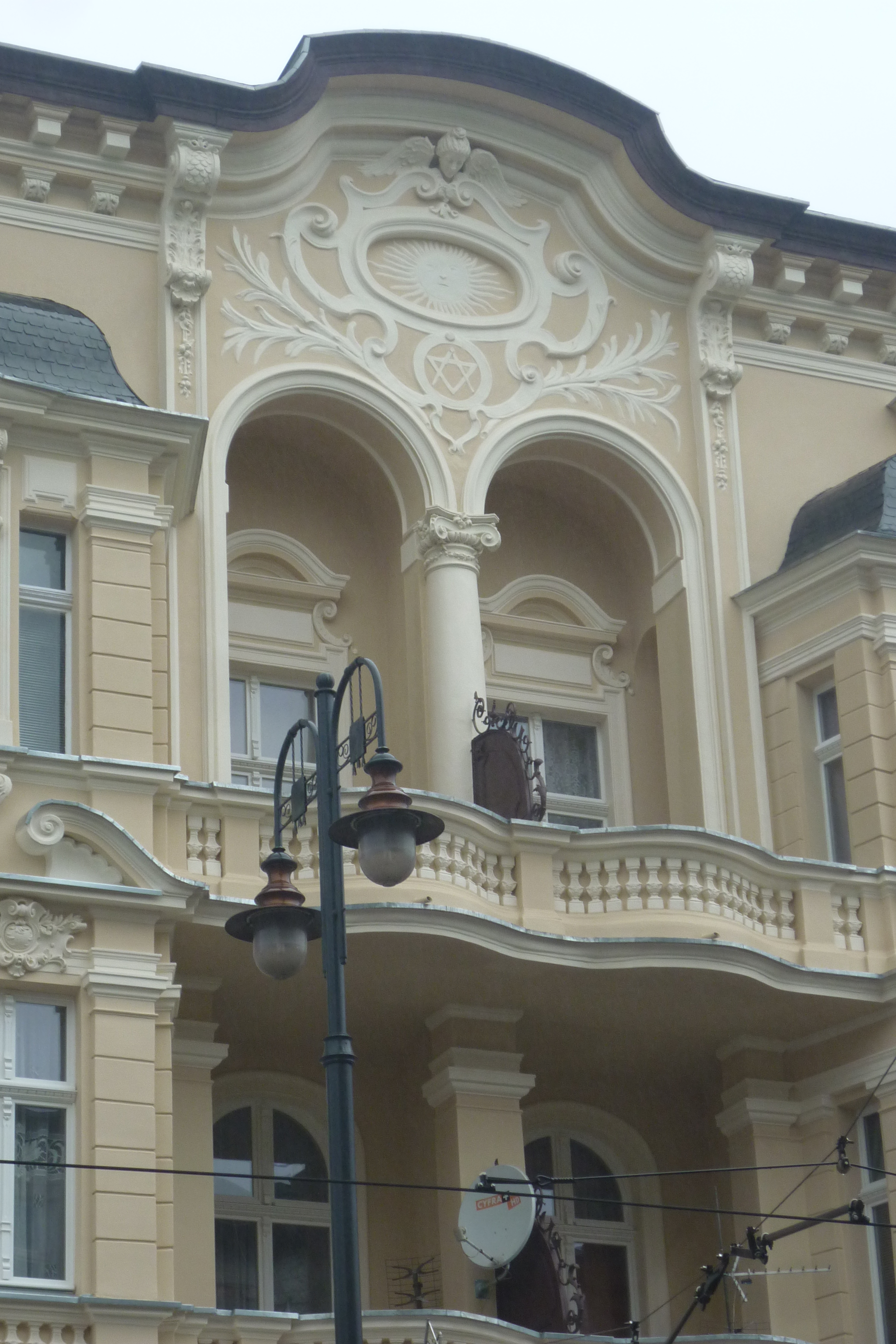
Detail of a balcony

=== Paul Böhm's House at 3 ===
Registered on Kuyavian-Pomeranian Voivodeship Heritage List, Nr.601269-Reg.A/1105 (25 October 1993)

1903–1904, by Paul Böhm

German Historicism & Art Nouveau

The architect Paul Böhm was also the owner of the tenement. In 1906, the house was acquired Mr Schmidt, an engineer. During interwar period, the building housed a Preparatory School, St. Kazimierz. The same year, the physician and activist Jan Biziel moved there with his family to establish his medical practice. He now has a memorial plaque set on house's wall. From October 1924 to July 1934, Ludwik Regamey and his second wife Maria lived there. She opened and ran a French school in their home.

The building was designed on a "U" shape, as a four-storey main building and a residential outbuilding located in the back. Indoor, a high Mansard roof hides an attic apartment. The facade has different balconies, a frame construction in the top floor, and a polygonal tower covered with a tented roof. The ensemble had been restored in 2025.

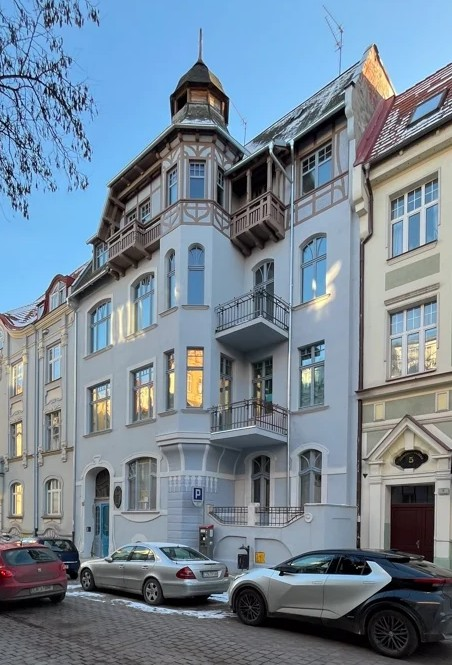
Renovated facade

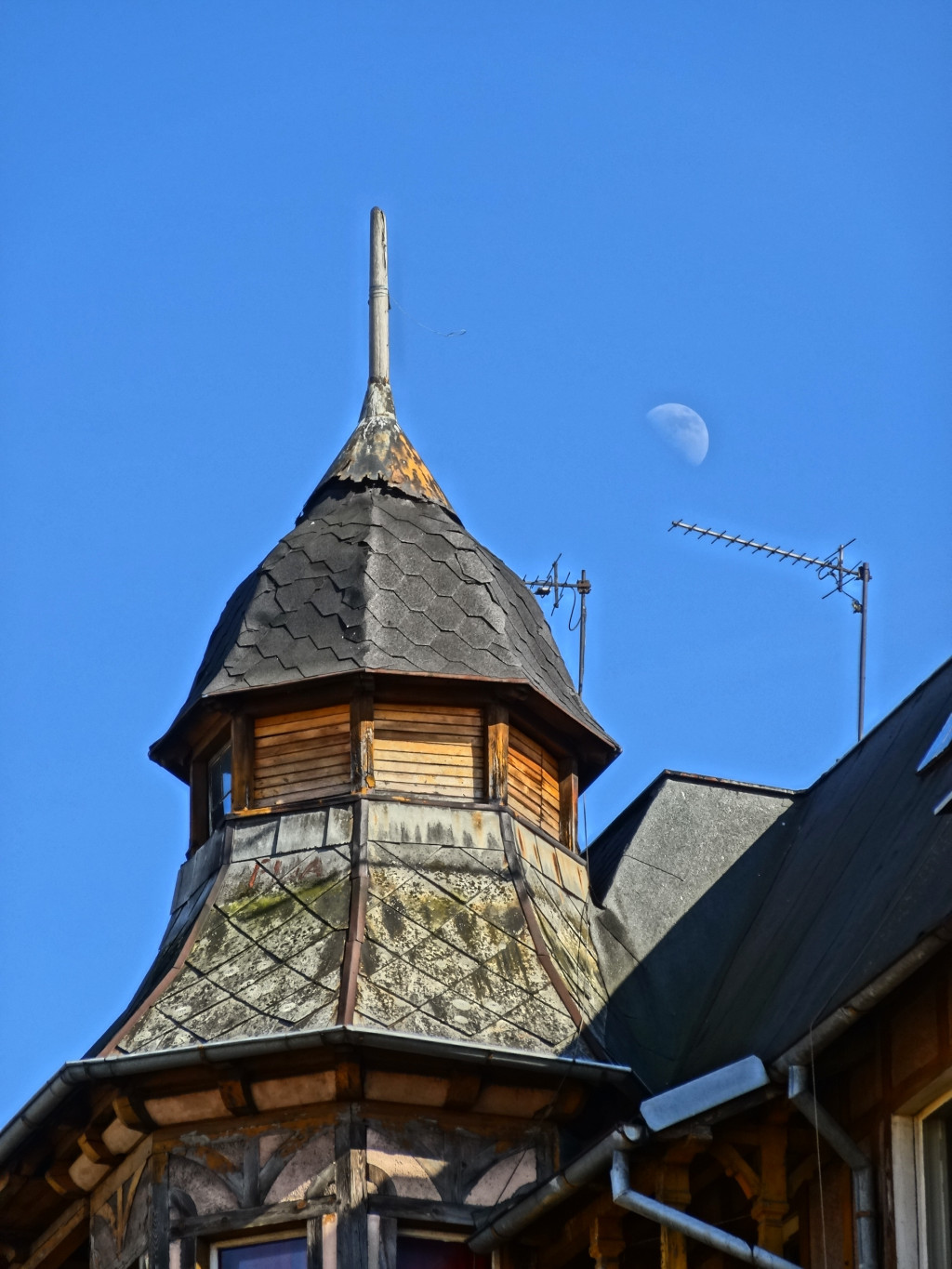
Tented roof

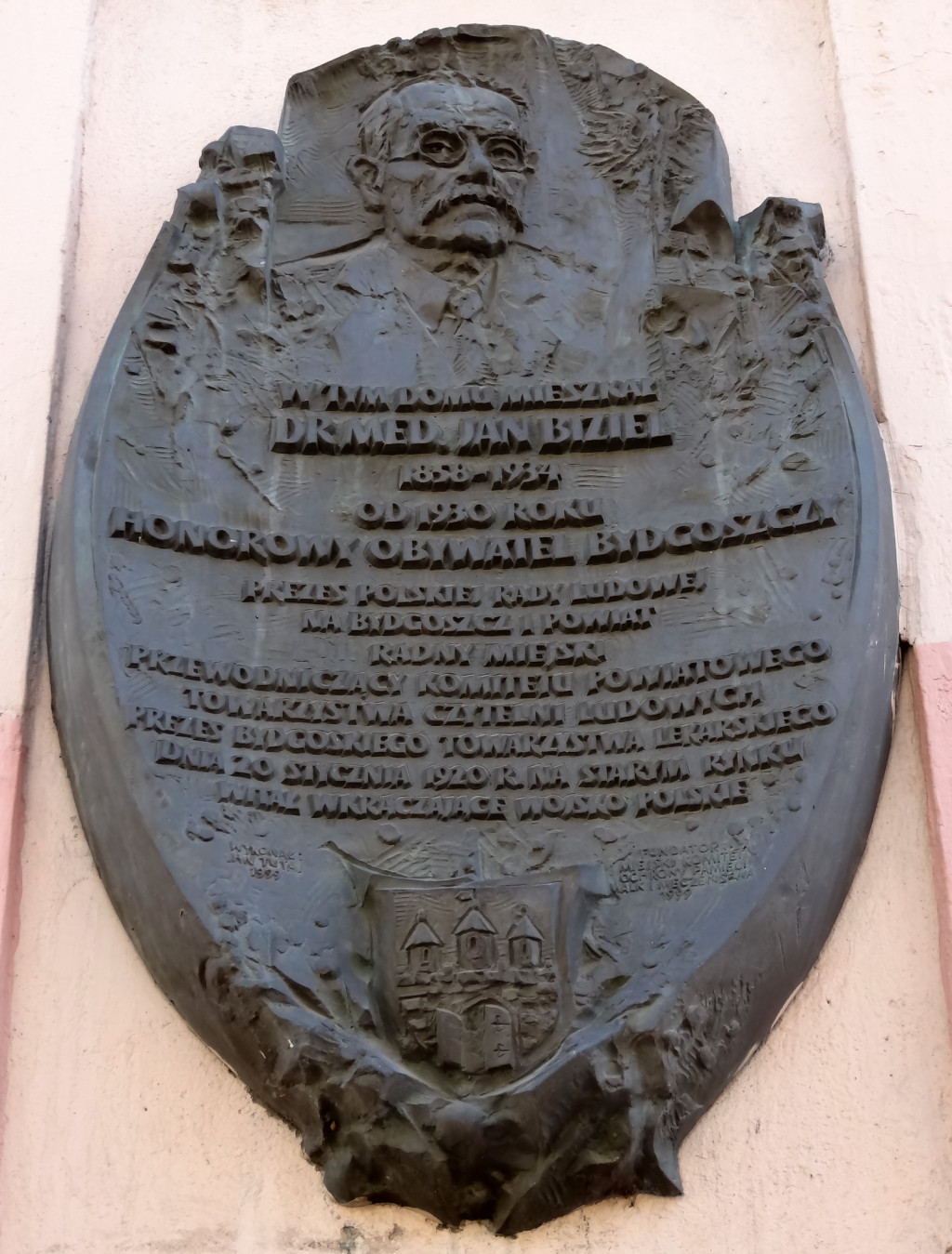
Plaque in memoriam of Jan Biziel

=== House at 4 ===
1899–1900, by Rudolf Kern

Eclecticism, elements of Neo-Gothic and Art Nouveau

The building has been erected between 1899 and 1900, by Rudolf Kern according to the project of Józef Święcicki. He worked as an associate of Święcicki and later on an independent designer, of many townhouses in downtown such as:

- Its own house located at Mickiewicz Alley 1;
- August Mentzel Tenement at 5 Gdanska;
- Eduard Schulz Tenement at Gdanska Nr.66/68;
- Tenement at Gdanska street 71.

In the years 1906–1919, Dr. Heinrich Boksch was the owner (address was then Molkestrasse 2. In 1926, the building housed a branch of Bank Stadthagen (Polish: Bank Stadthagen. Towarzystwo Akcyjne), established in 1892 by Lewin Louis Aronsohn who had his own house downtown. The large opening on the ground floor of the facade has been realized on the initiative of the bank, to allow light to flow from the street. From March 1945 to 1948, the edifice housed "Bydgoszcz Drama School" (Polish: Szkoła Dramatyczna w Bydgoszczy). It had been created by Aleksander Rodziewicz: his successor as headmaster was Adam Grzymała-Siedlecki.

The three-storey building with residential attic is built on a polygon footprint with an interior courtyard. The front elevation is asymmetrical, with avant-corps surmounted by a gable from pinnacles, along with loggias and bay windows. The upper parts of the facade were built with Timber framing method. It is one of the few picturesque achievements of Józef Święcicki avant-garde buildings in the end of the 19th century. Stucco decoration of the facade is dominated by stylized floral elements, branch tracery rose window and decorative cartouches. The tenement has been entirely restored in 2016–2017.

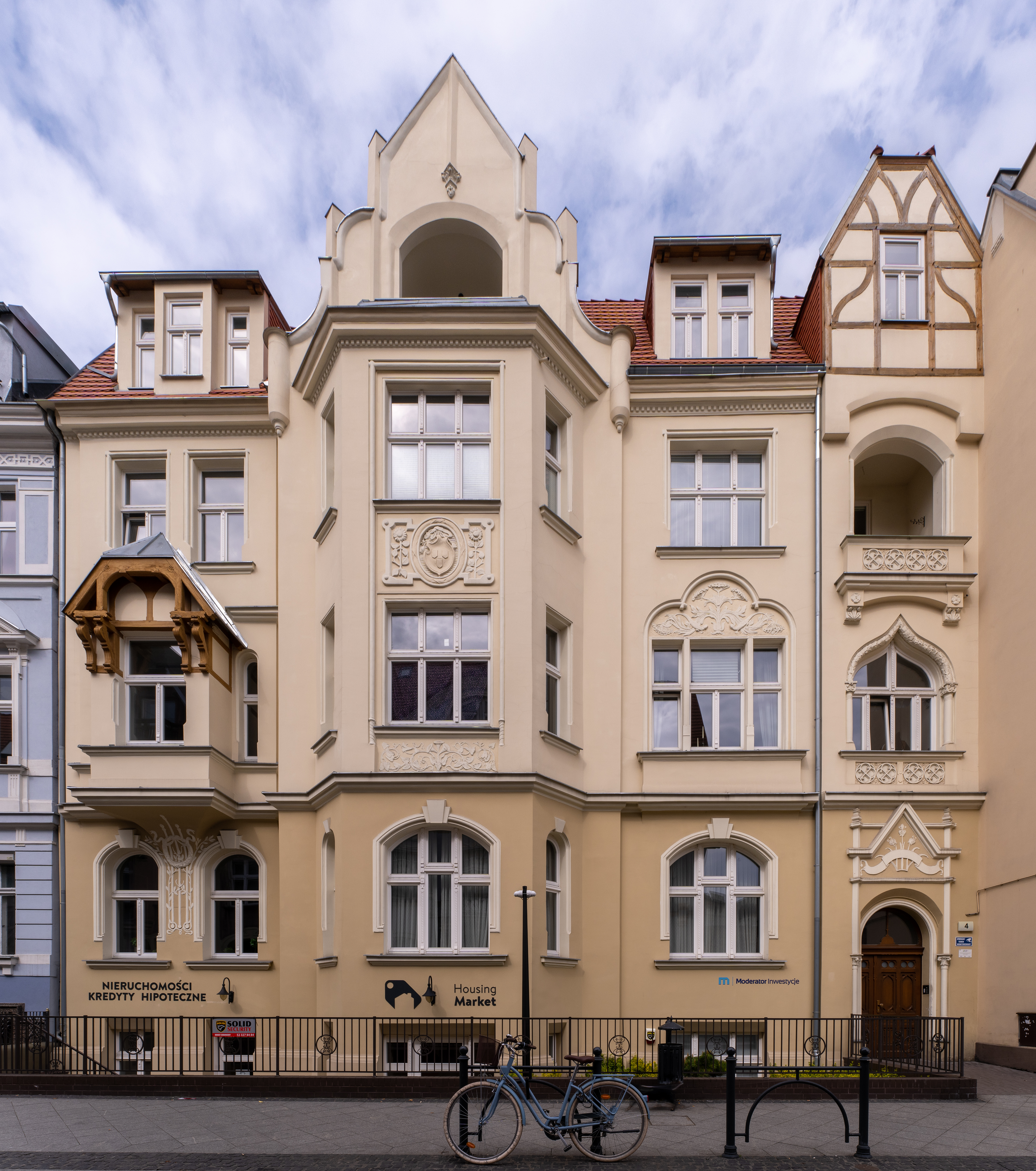
Main front elevation

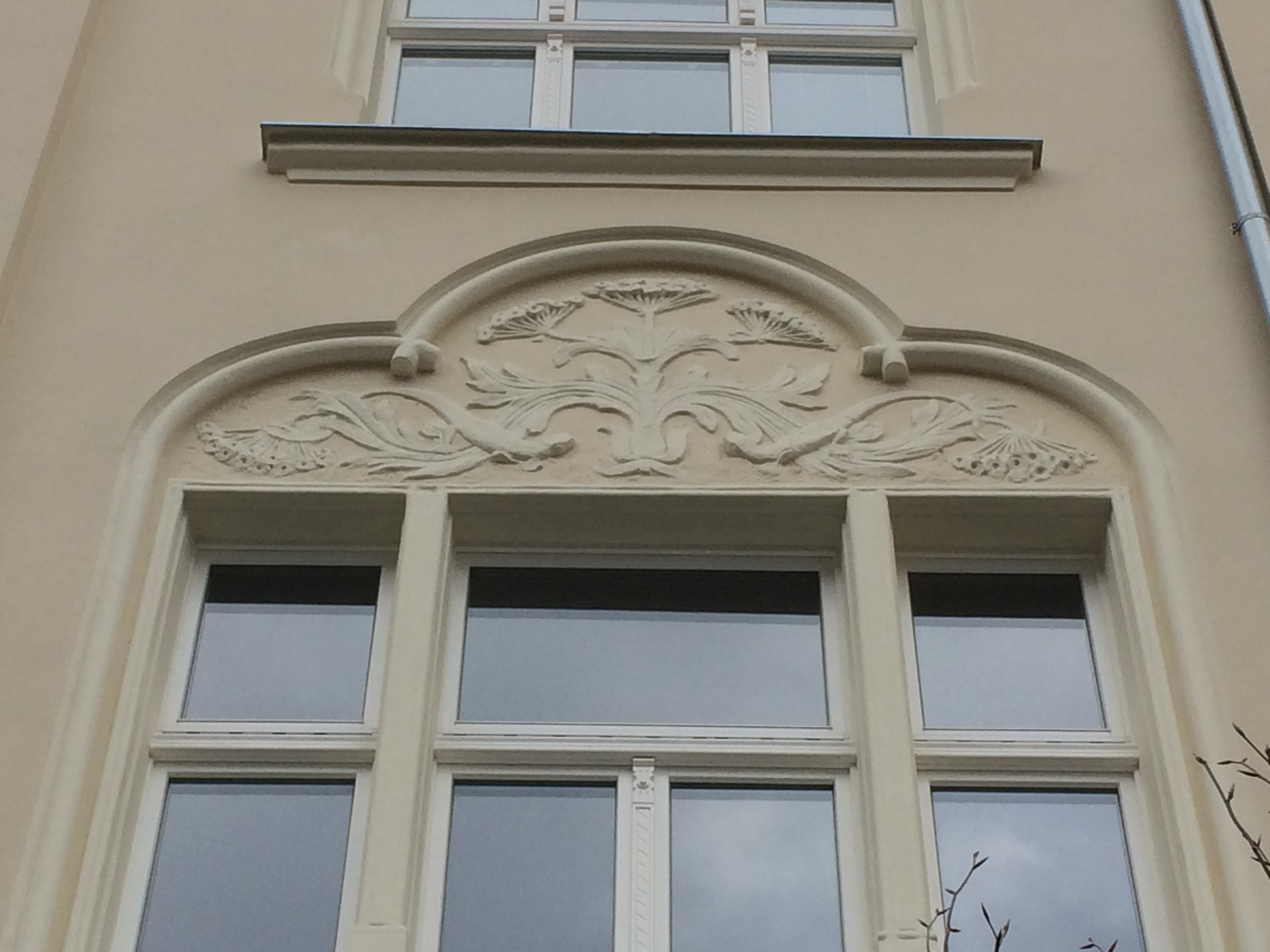
Windows adornement

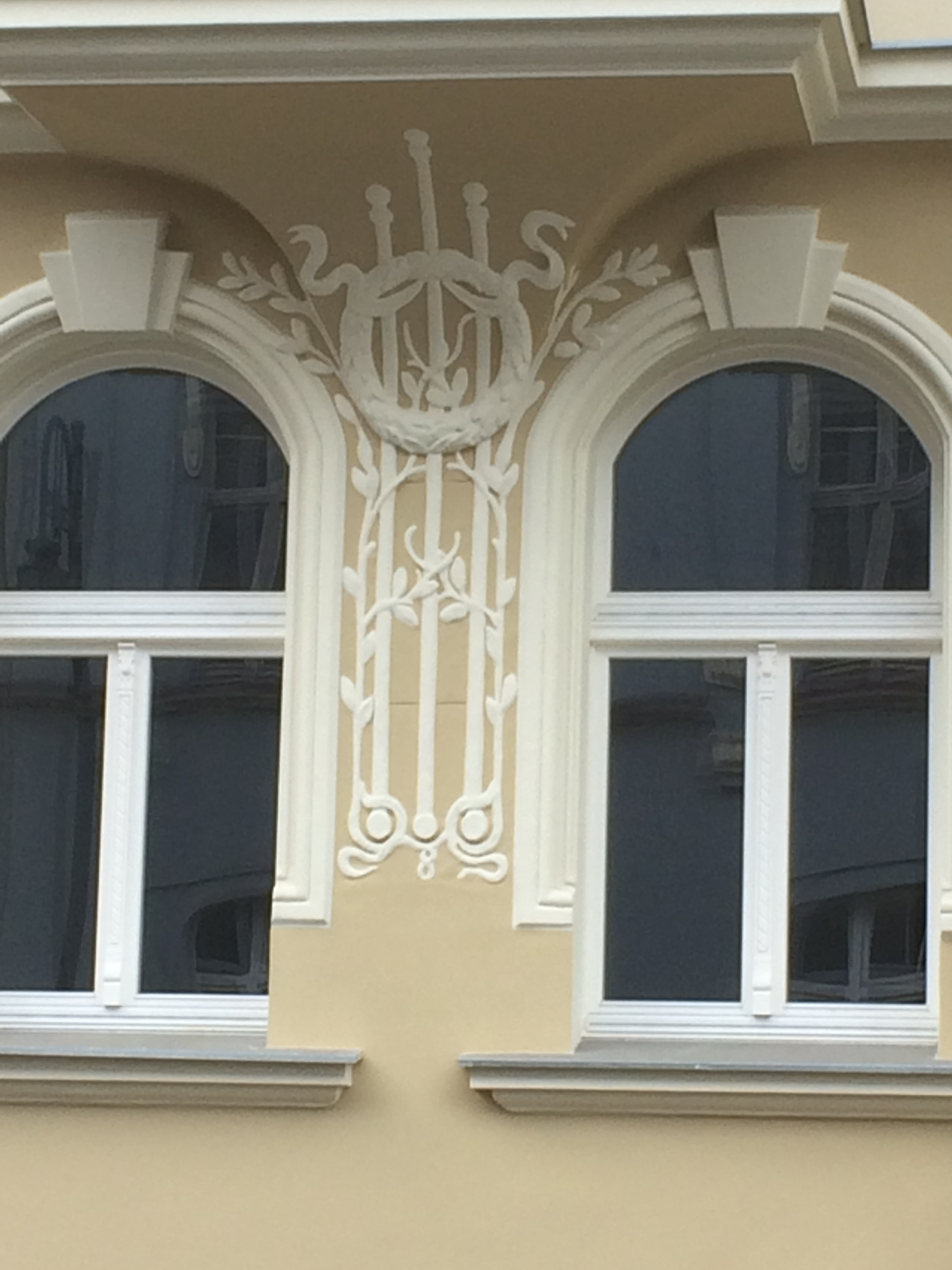
Detail of stylized floral elements

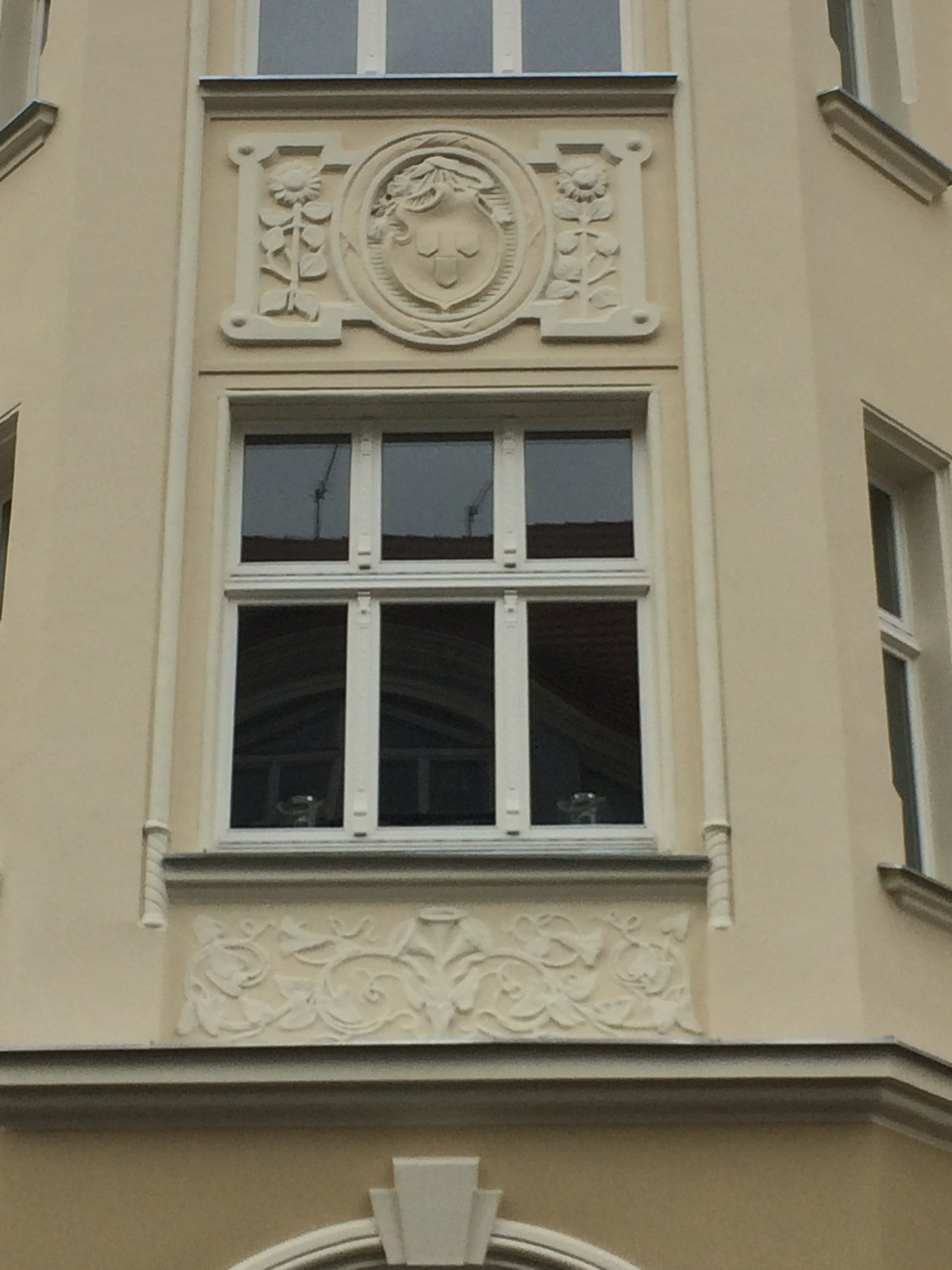
Stucco decoration on the facade

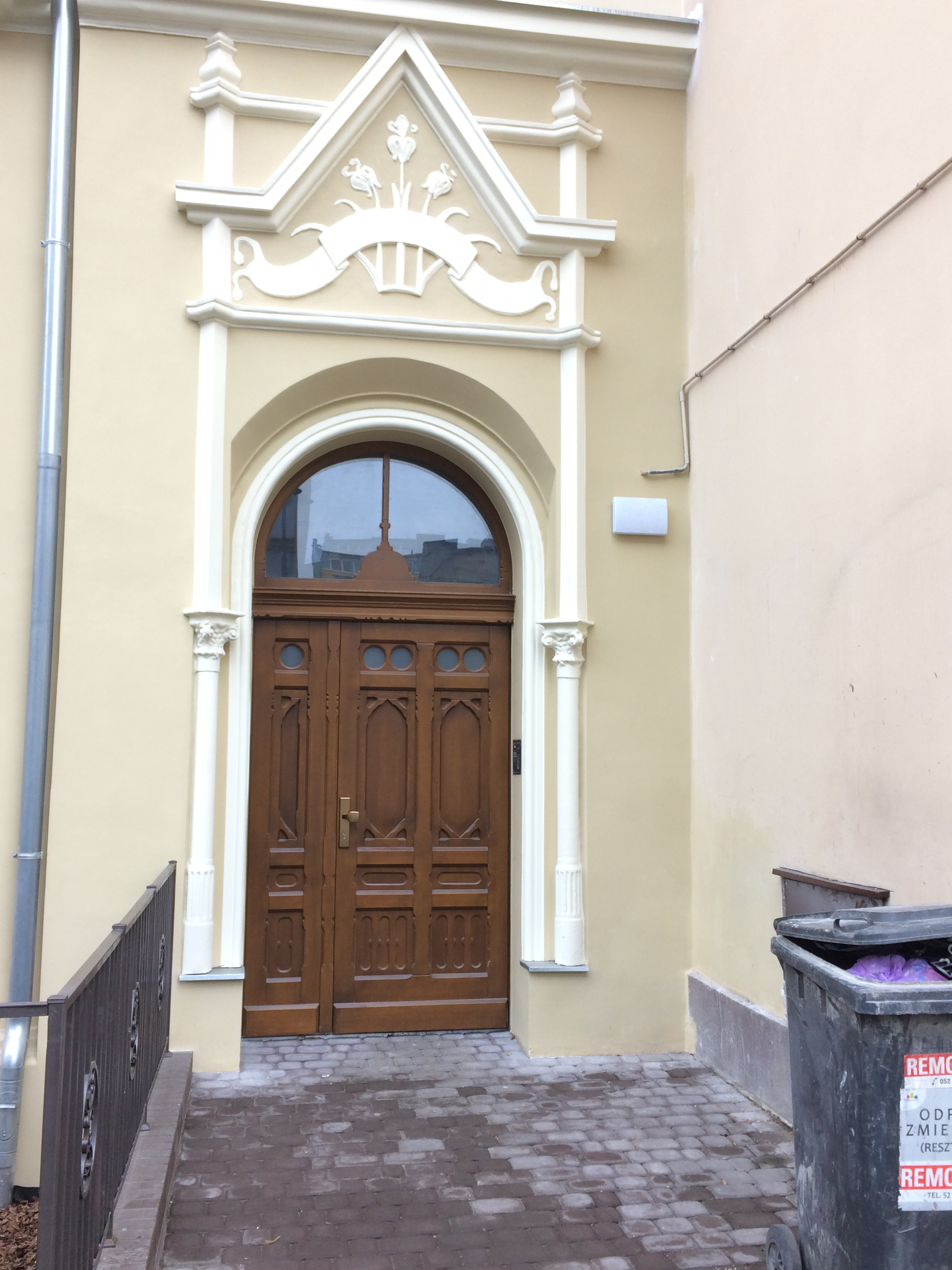
Door portal

=== House at 5 ===
1903–1904, by Ernst Peters

Eclecticism & Modern architecture

The building was erected on a lot covering Cieszkowski Nr.5 and Nr.7 owned by Franz Muhme, a mastermason, at Moltkestrasse 19. It was one of the last tenements built in August Cieszkowski Street as demarcated in 1894. In 1927, the building was bought by the Health District Department, adapting it for clinical use. After World War II, a clinic had been operating here until 1994. The present state of the building reflects the overhaul work carried out from 1987 to 1998.

The three-storey building with a loft has an inverted "T"-shape footprint, with an outbuilding in the wing. The Mansard roof shelters attics. The avant-corps of the front elevation is capped with a triangular gable. Most elements of the original design of the building no longer exists, lacking original stucco decoration. However, part of the interiors by Ernst Peters are still preserved.

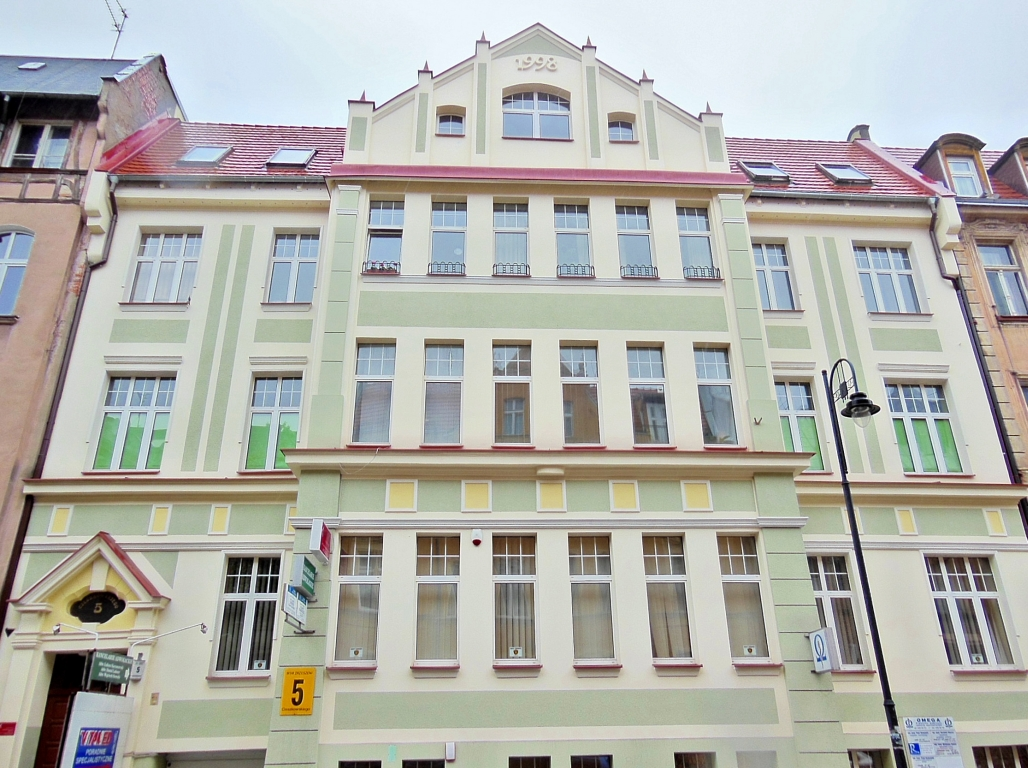
Facade onto the street

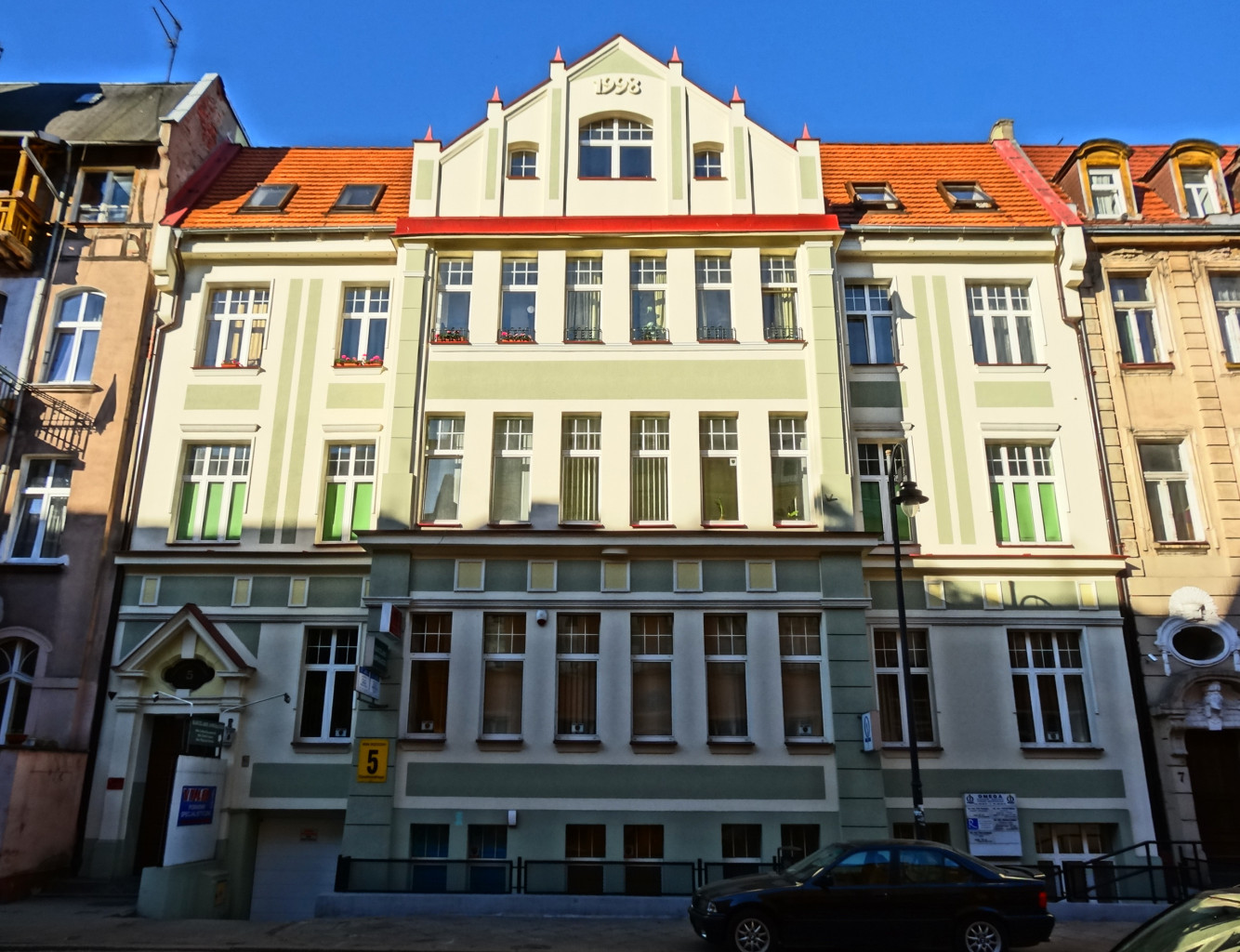
Front elevation

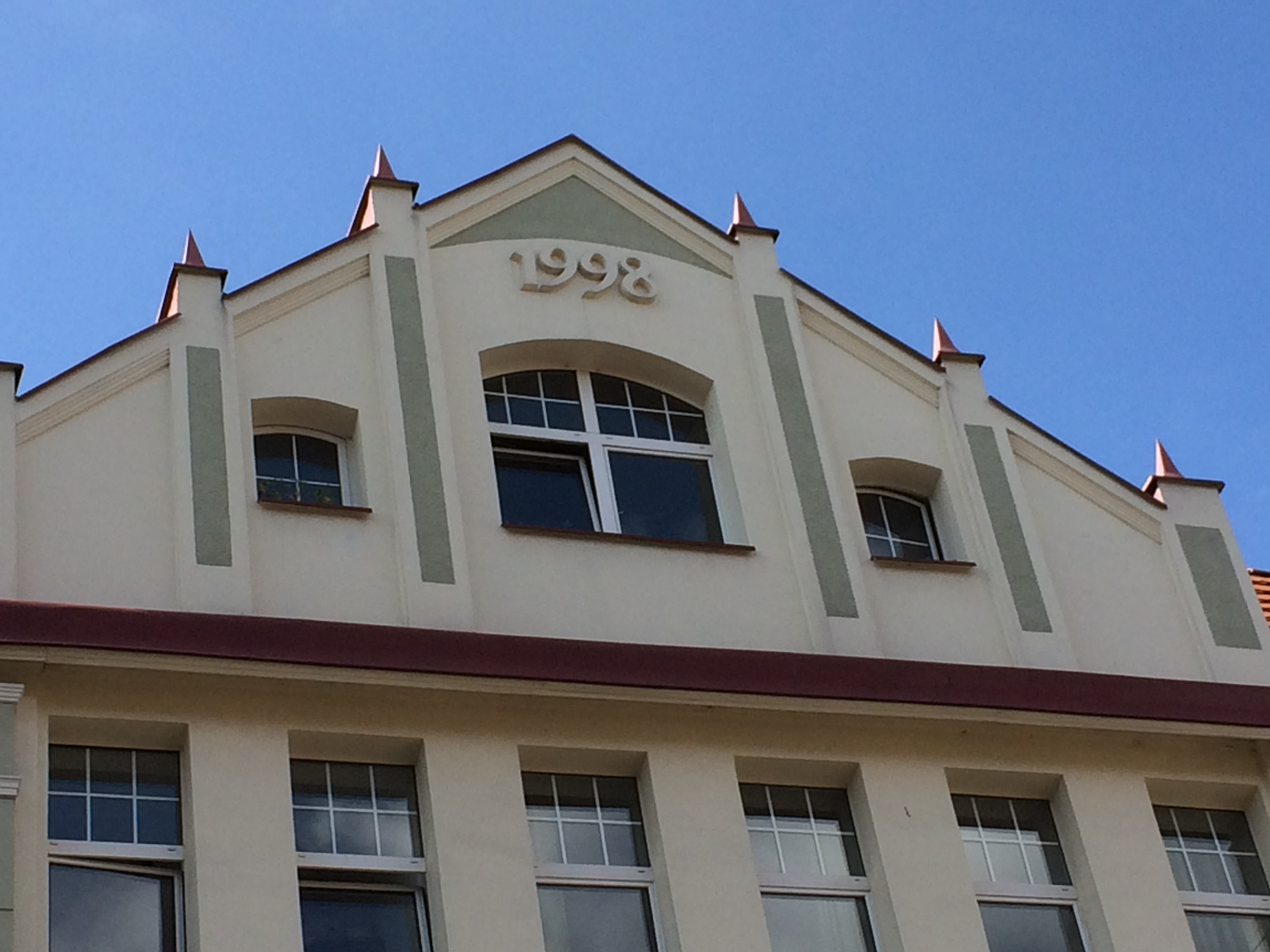
Detail of facade gable

=== Carl Meyer's house at 6 ===
1897–1898 by Carl Meyer

Eclecticism

The building was erected by Carl Meyer for his own use. It was one of the first tenements built in the Cieszkowski Street. Carl Meyer built several other edifices in downtown Bydgoszcz, among others:

- House at Gdanska Street 60;
- Bydgoszcz Water supply station, along with the architect Marshall.

Construction work at Cieszkowski 6 has been carried out by master mason Hermann Lewandowski and master carpenter Rudolf Berndt. In 1941, the house was requisitioned by the Reich Ministry of Labour to house the District Supply Office.

The three-storey building with a loft has a polygon base with avant-corps. The building displays eclecticism, typical in Bydgoszcz at the end of 19th century. Many decoration details are to be mentioned, such as:

- Stylized sun ornaments,
- Cartouches with mask,
- Mantling with palmettes and ribbons.

On the facade are placed cartouches displaying a triangle and a compass, as symbols of Carl Meyer's profession.

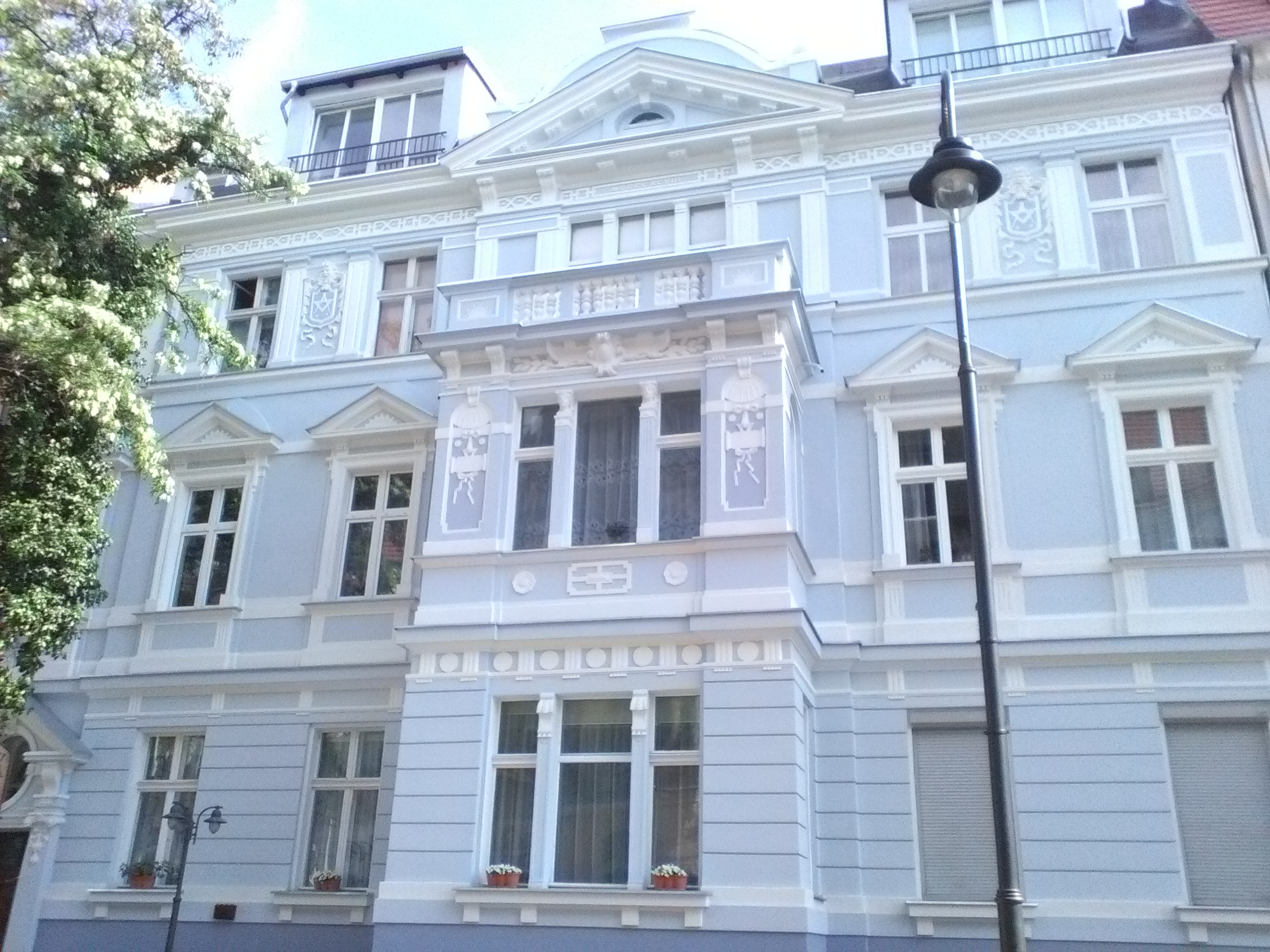
Facade onto the street after renovation

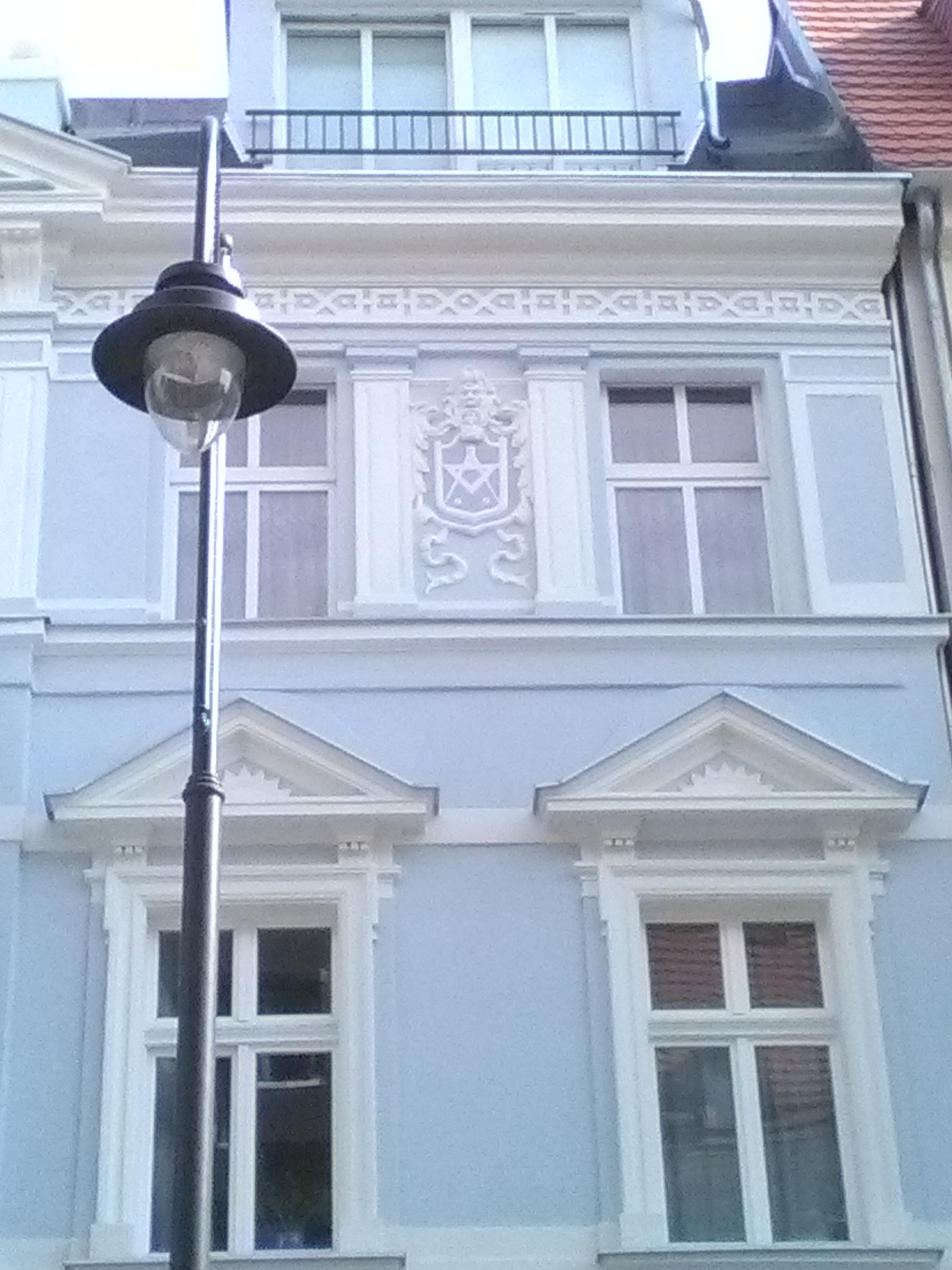
Facade details

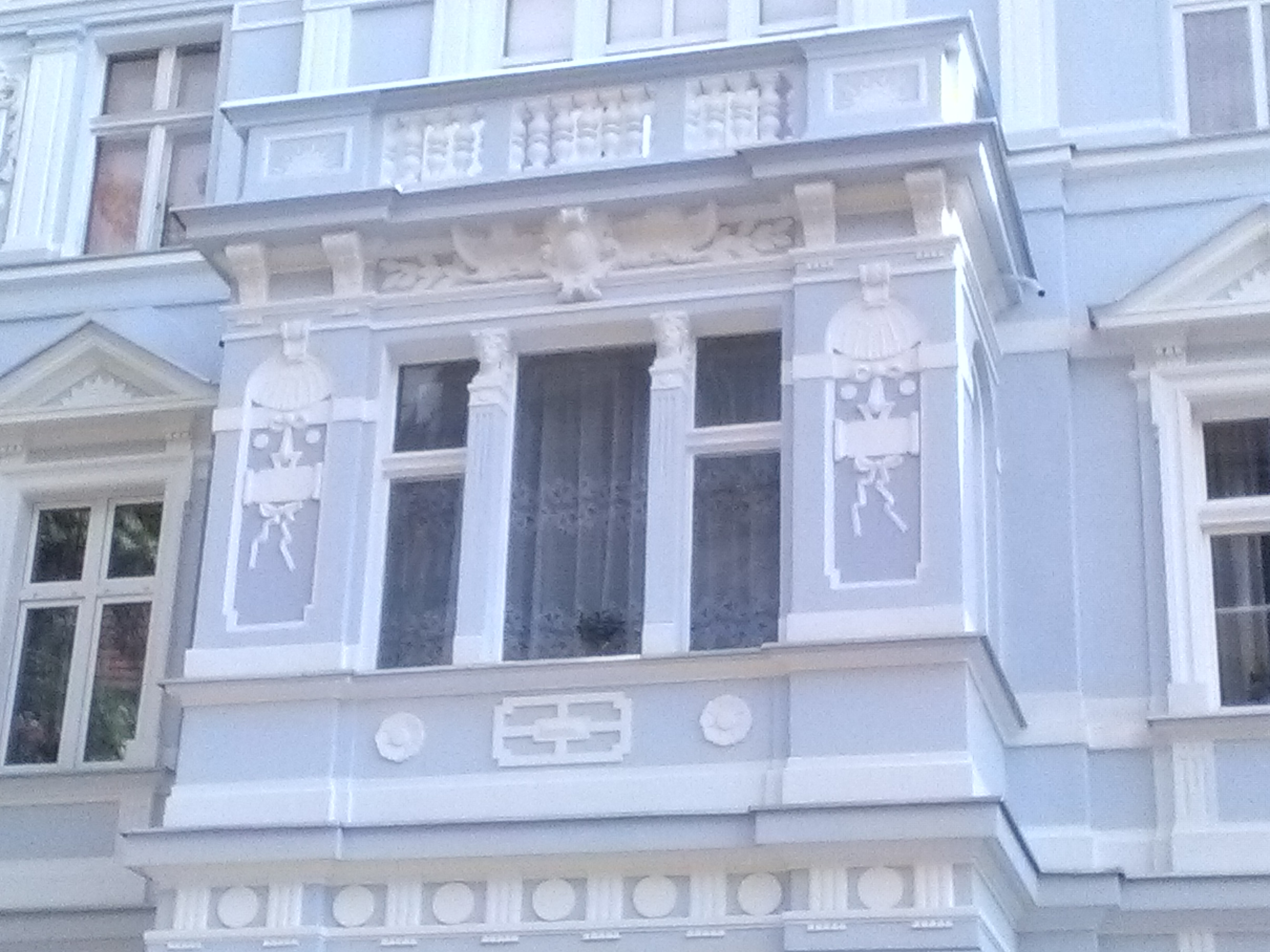
Avant-corps

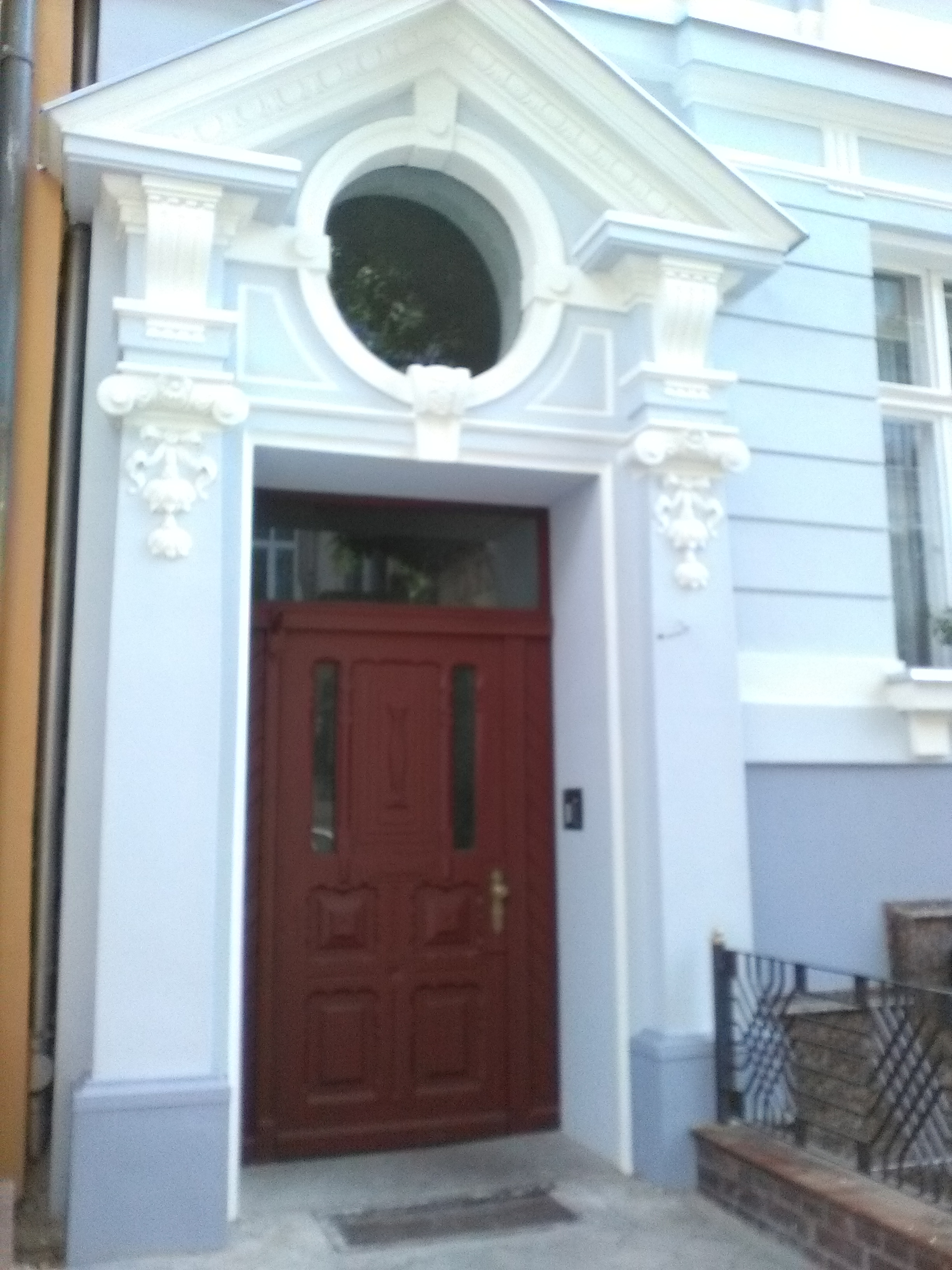
Portal

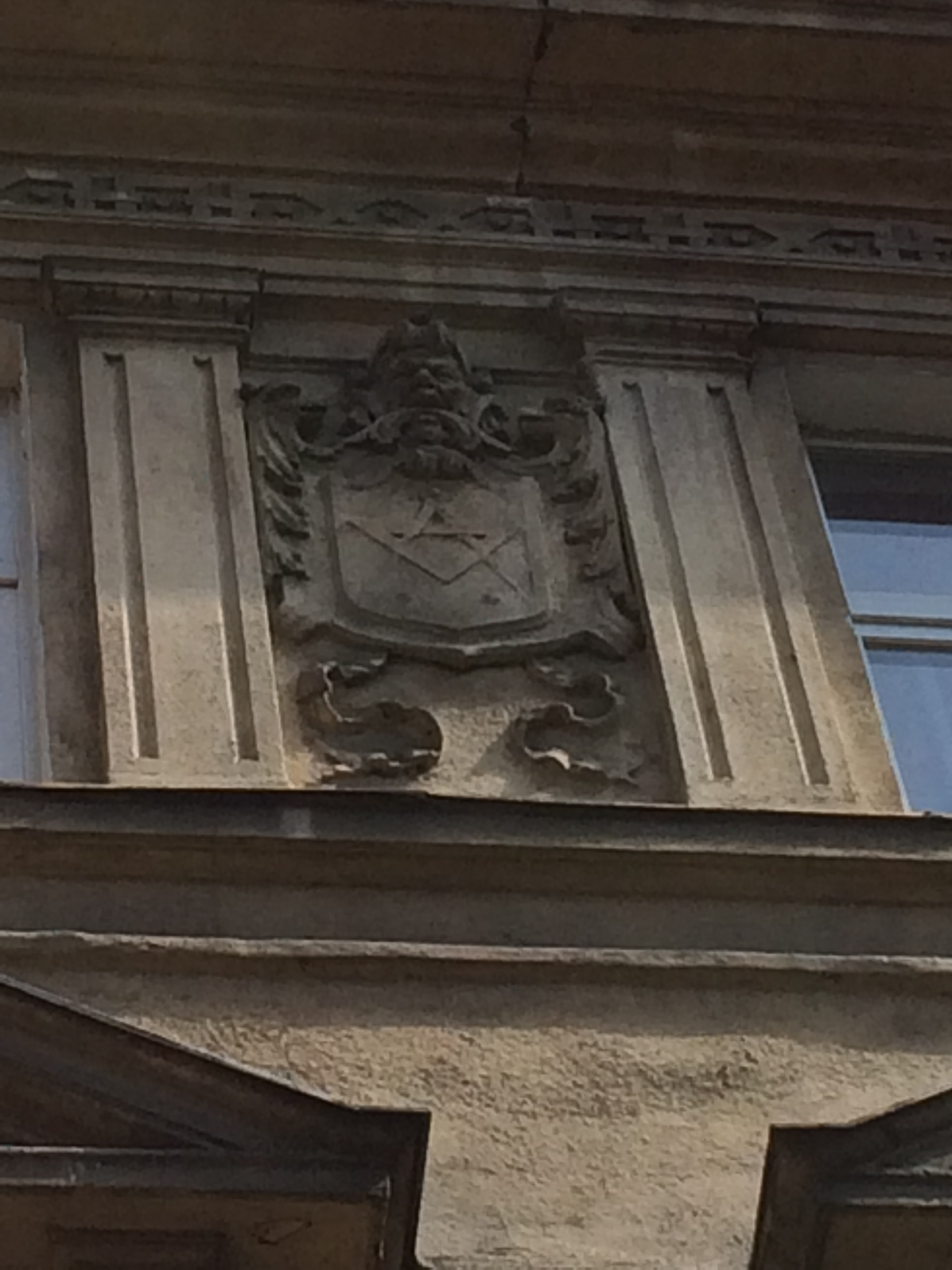
Detail of the cartouche displaying a triangle and a compass

=== House at 7 ===
Registered on Kuyavian-Pomeranian Voivodeship Heritage List, Nr.601270-Reg.A/1106 (15 November 1993)

1900–1902, by Karl Bergner

Eclecticism & Art Nouveau

The building was commissioned by Franz Muhme, owner of plots on Cieszkowski Nr.5 and Nr.7. The architect Karl Bergner had already designed many other buildings in Bromberg at the time:

- Houses at Foch St.2/4 in 1901–1902
- A tenement at Dworcowa St.68
- Several buildings in Cieszkowski St. (Nr. 7,9,14,16/20,24).

It is a four-storey building with a mansard roof attic, with a "L"-shape footprint. The front elevation is symmetrical along five axes, with an avant-corps surmounted by a terrace. The gate is decorated with the head of the woman, capped by a stylized oval-shaped palmette.

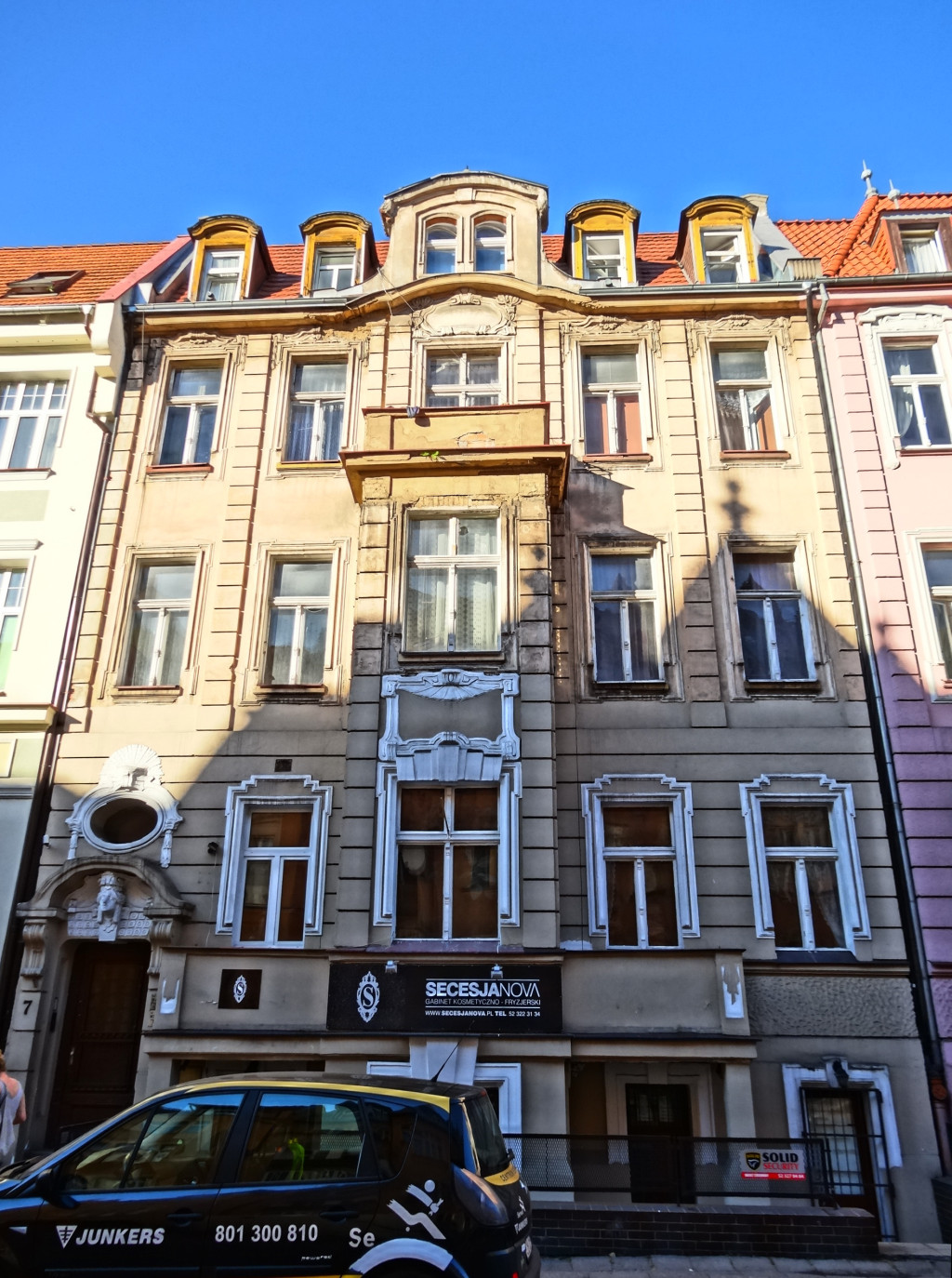
Main facade

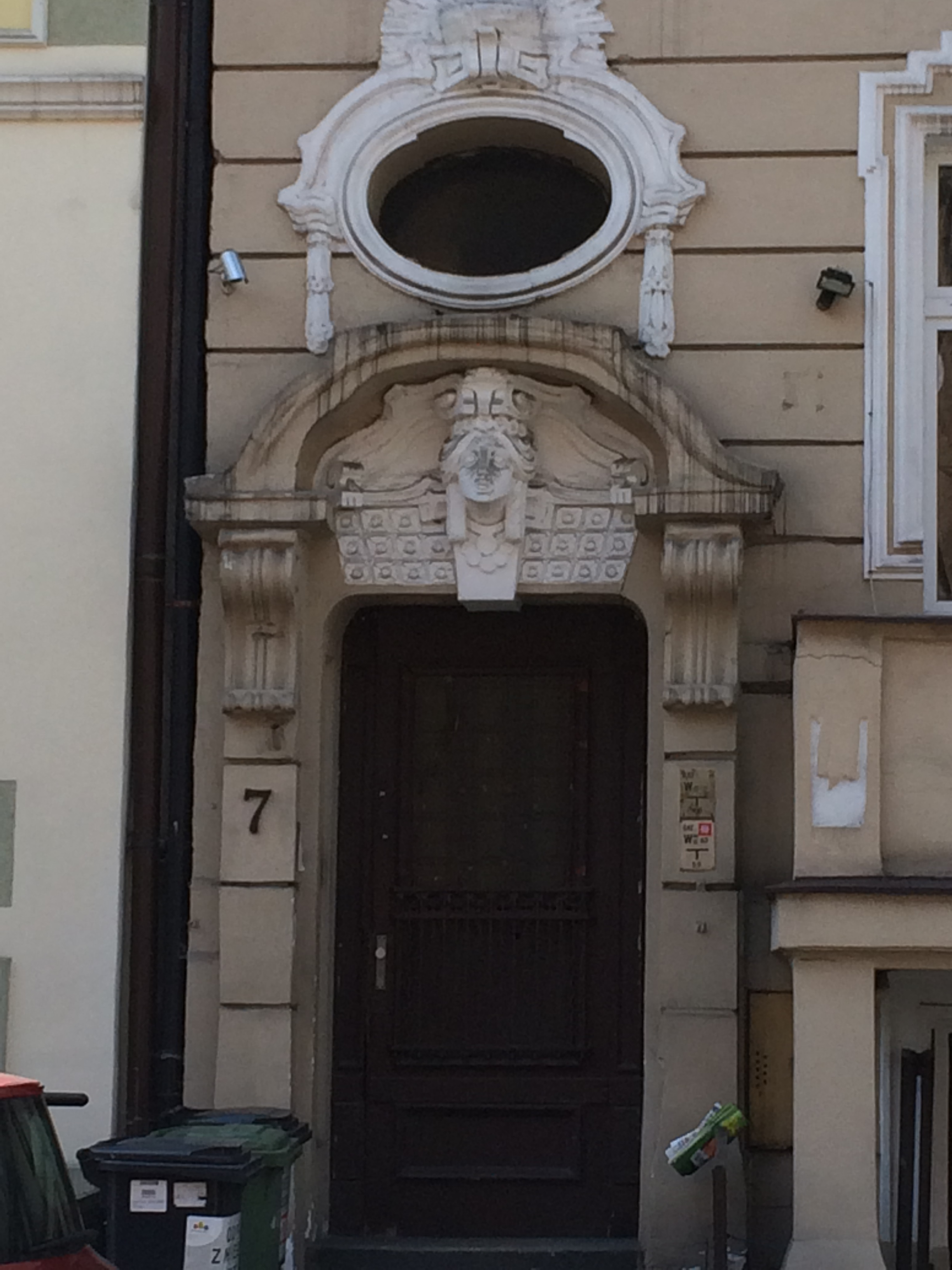
Detail of the gate

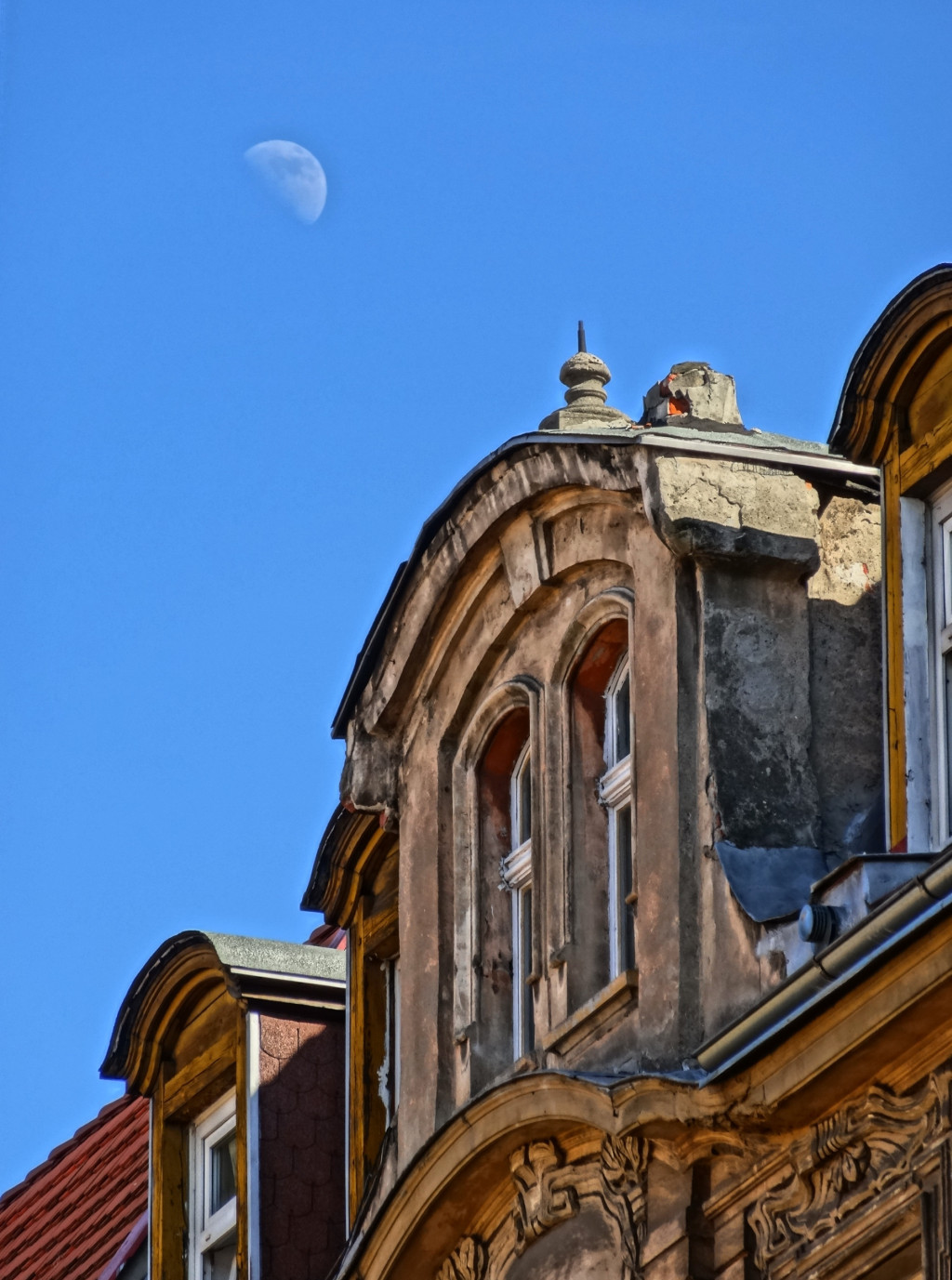
Gable

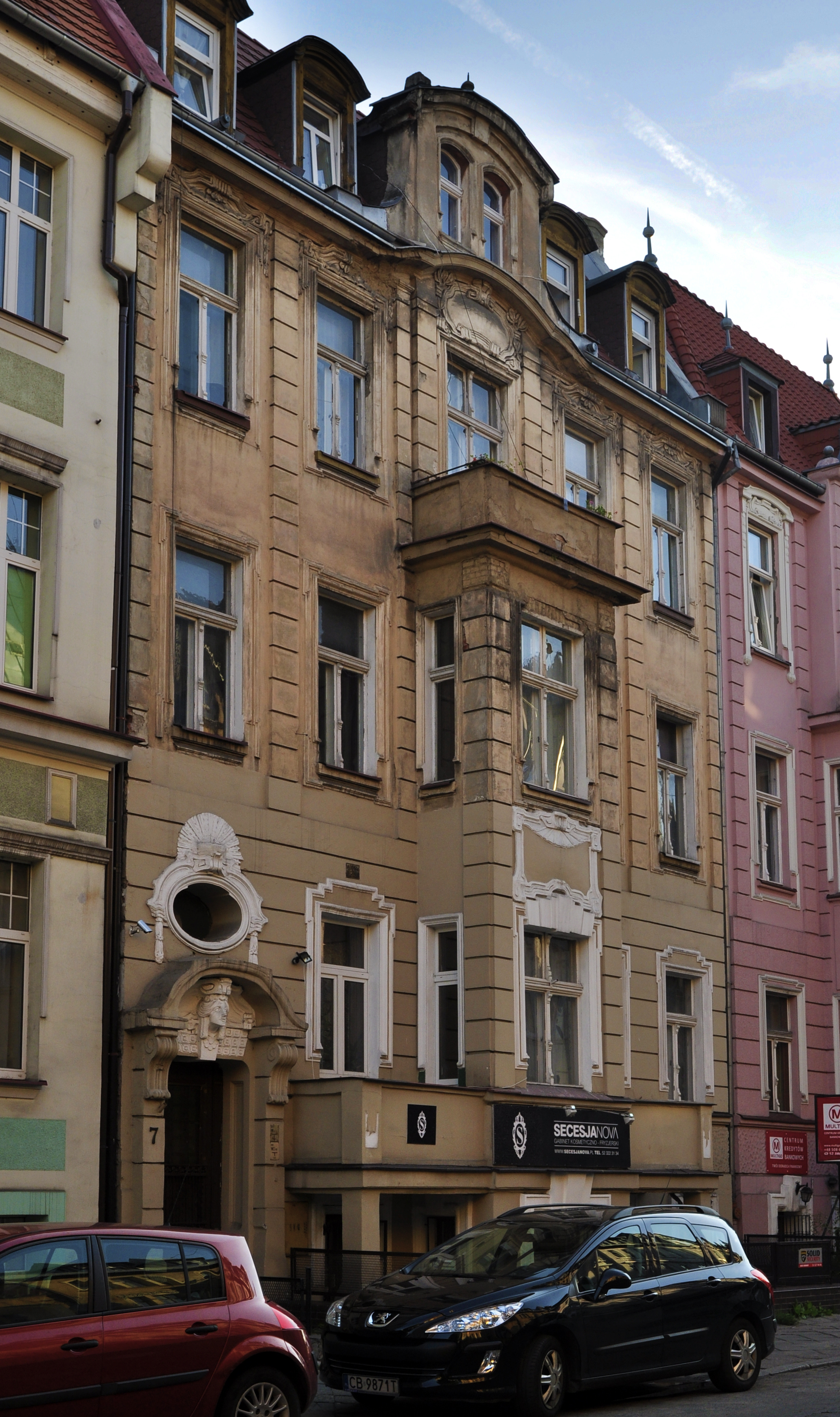
View of the avant-corps

=== House at 8 ===
1899–1900, by Józef Święcicki

Eclecticism & elements of Art Nouveau

Józef Święcicki intended to sell with profit the property once completed. However, during the construction Józef Święcicki sold the plot and the building rights to Alexander Grabowski. At its inception, building address was 4 Moltkestrasse.

Founded on an inverted "T"-shape, the four-storey building has a symmetrical front elevation with two avant-corps. The façade is topped by a triangular gable and a timbered mansard roof. Dominant motifs are stylized stucco ornaments: chestnut leaves, a twig woven into a coat of arms cartouches. At street level, the wall presents is a bas-relief of a heron in rushes, symbol of a peaceful human life existence.

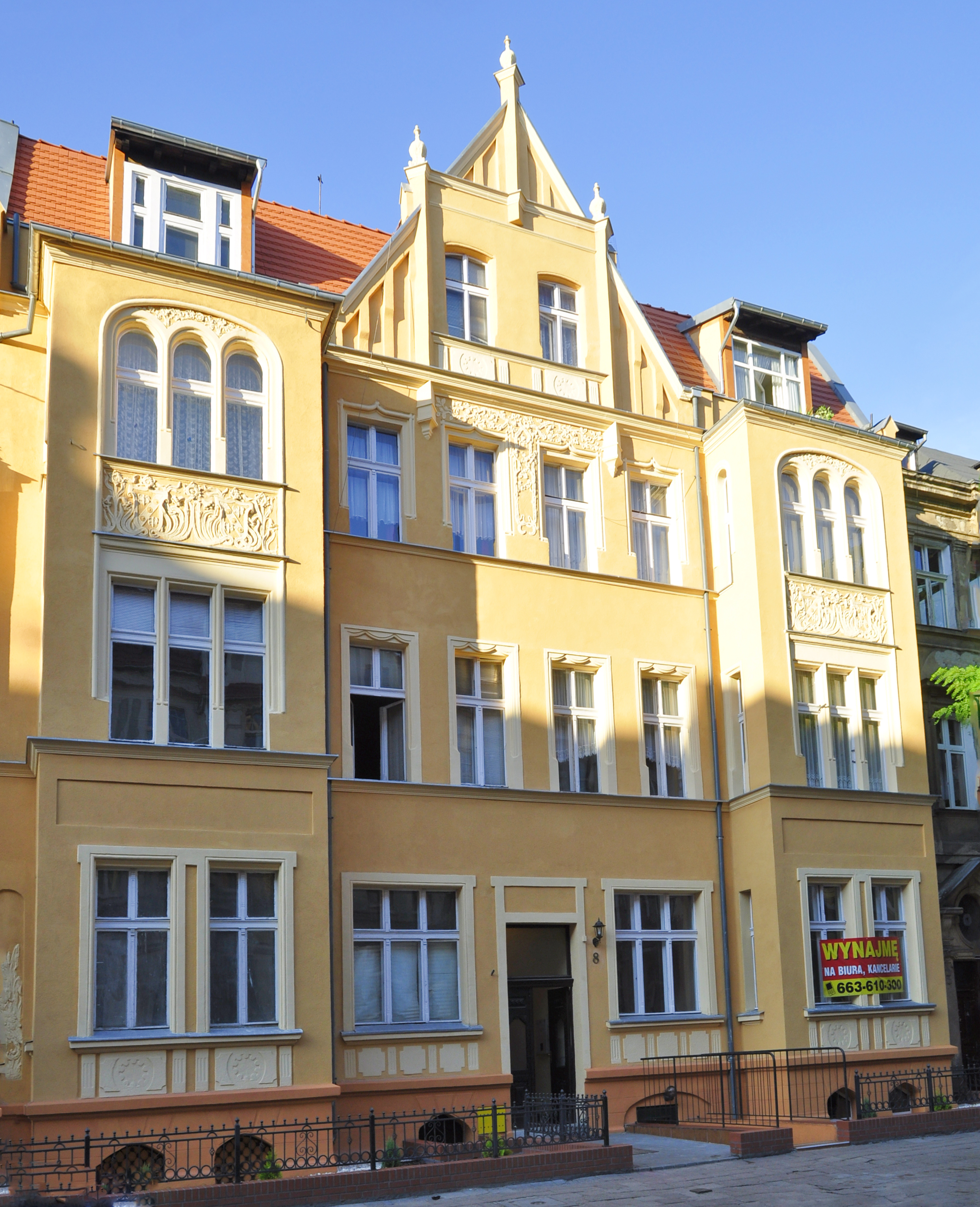
Main facade

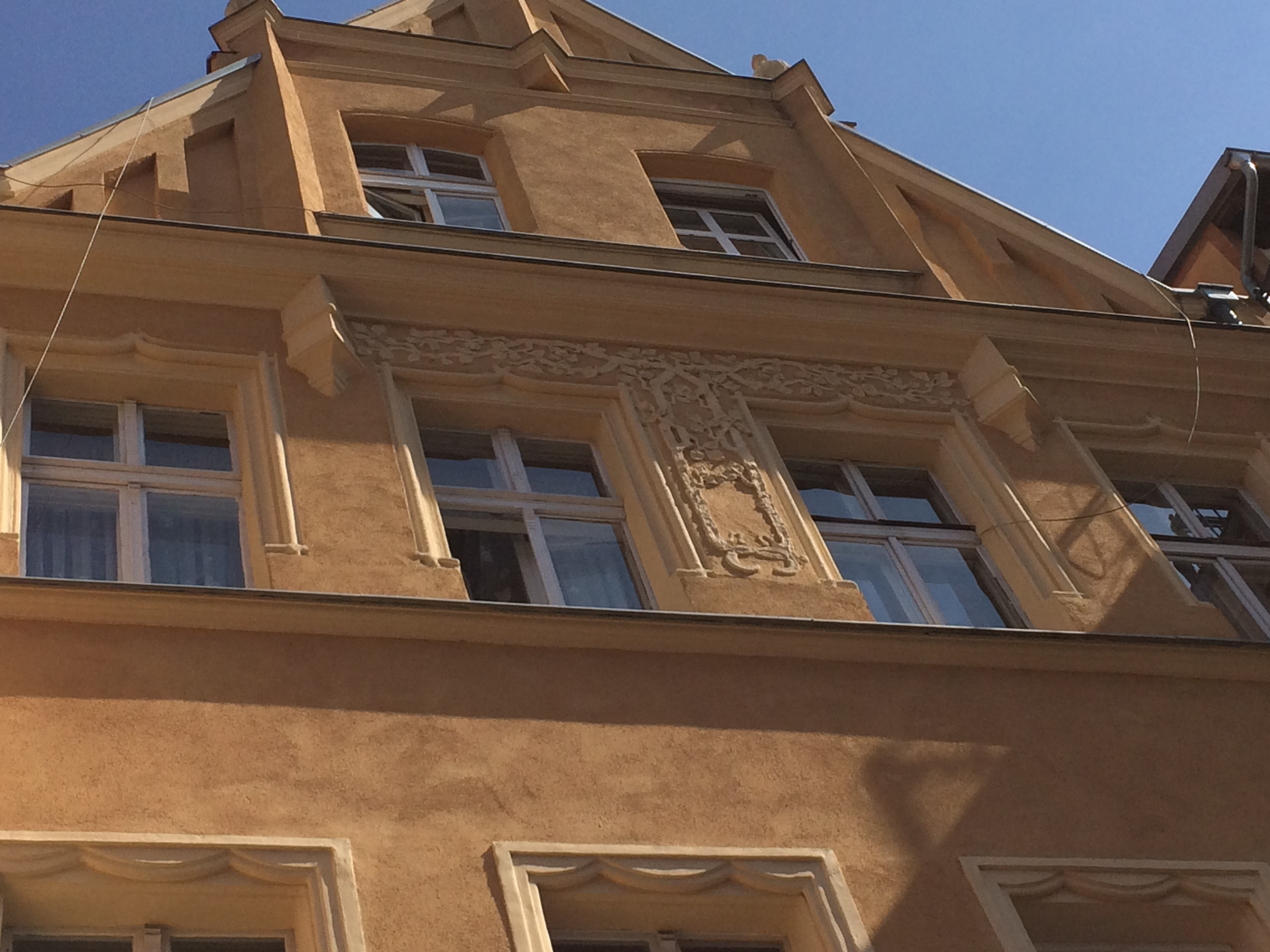
Facade details

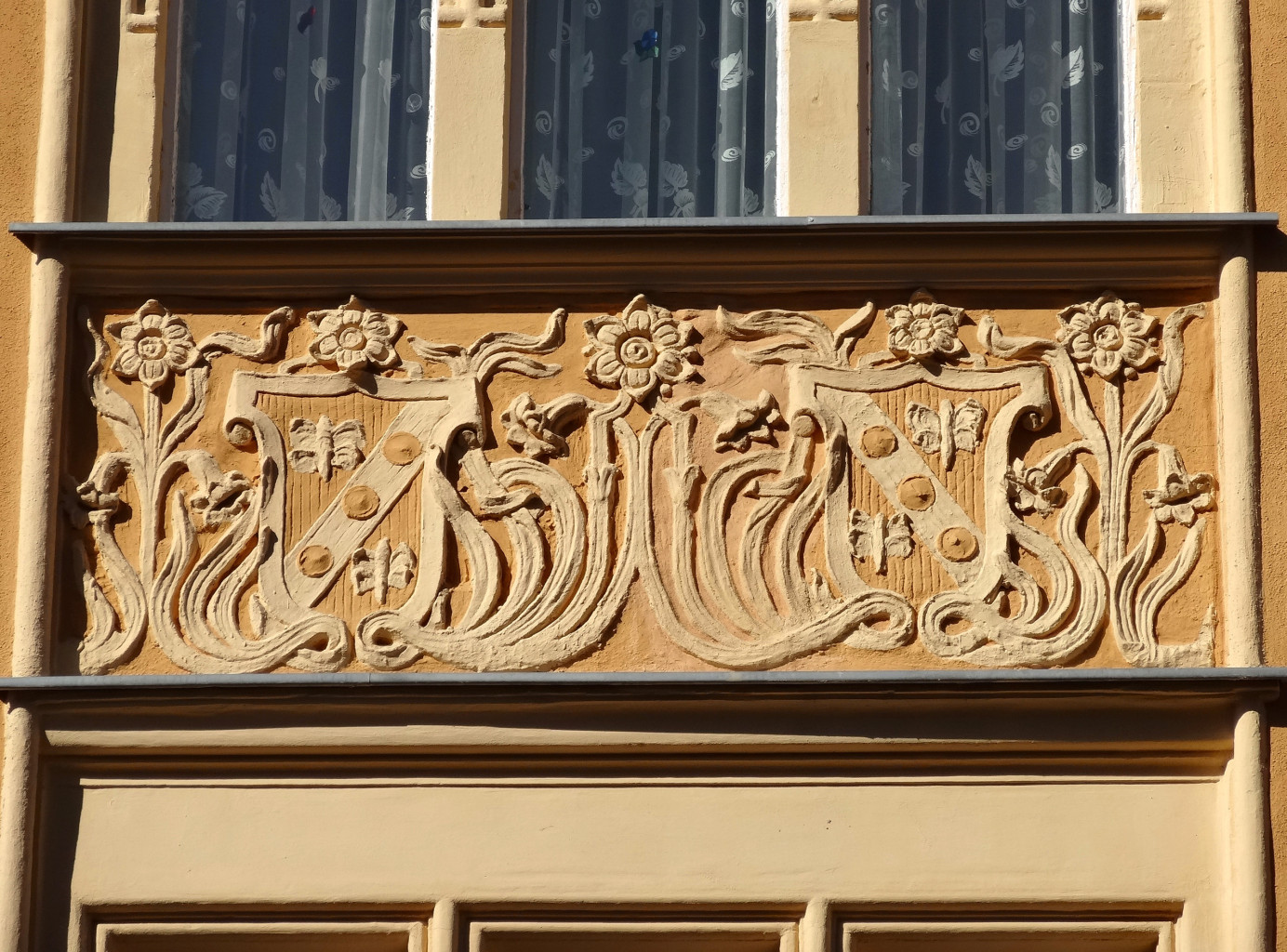
stucco ornaments

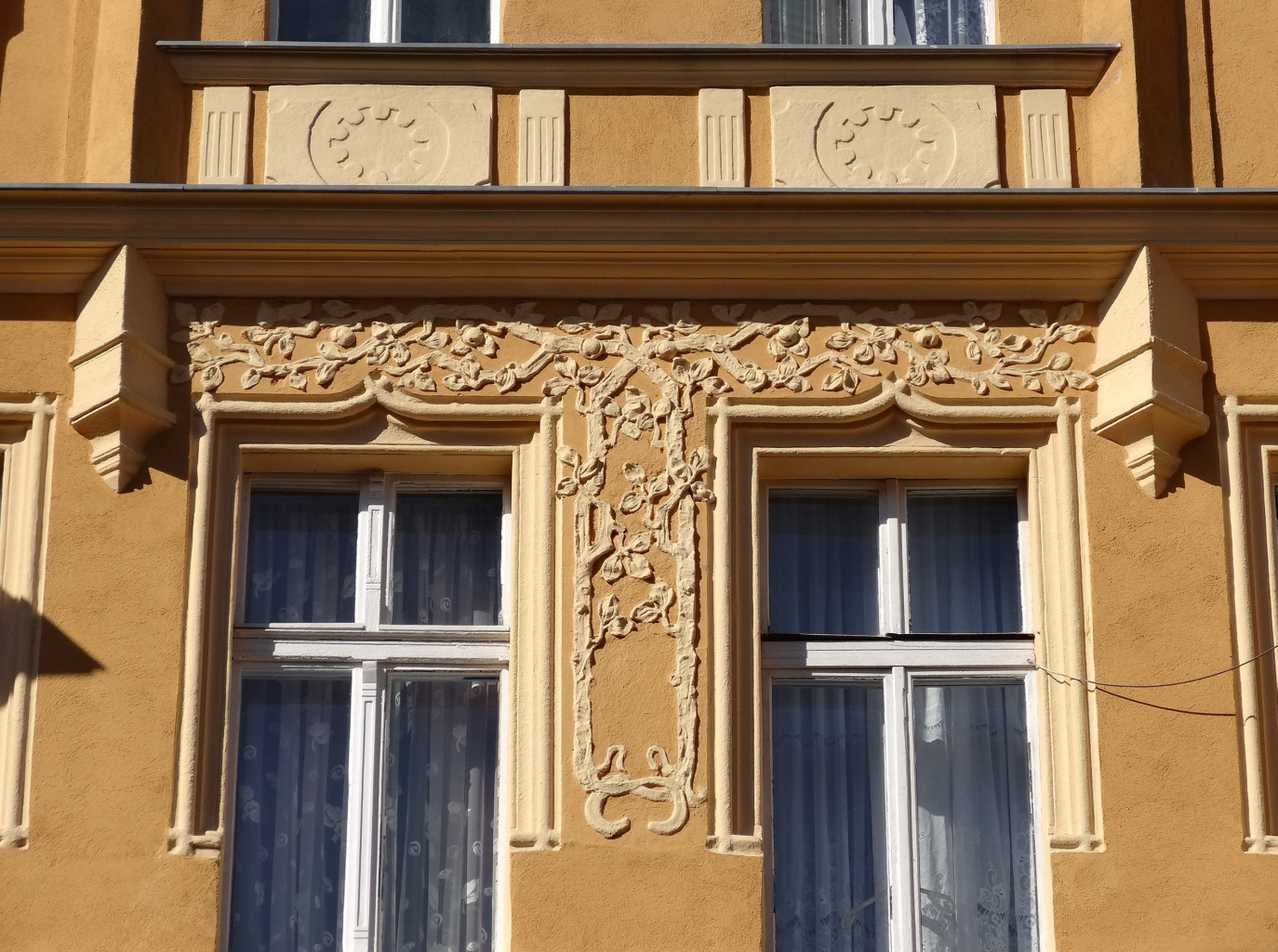
stucco ornaments

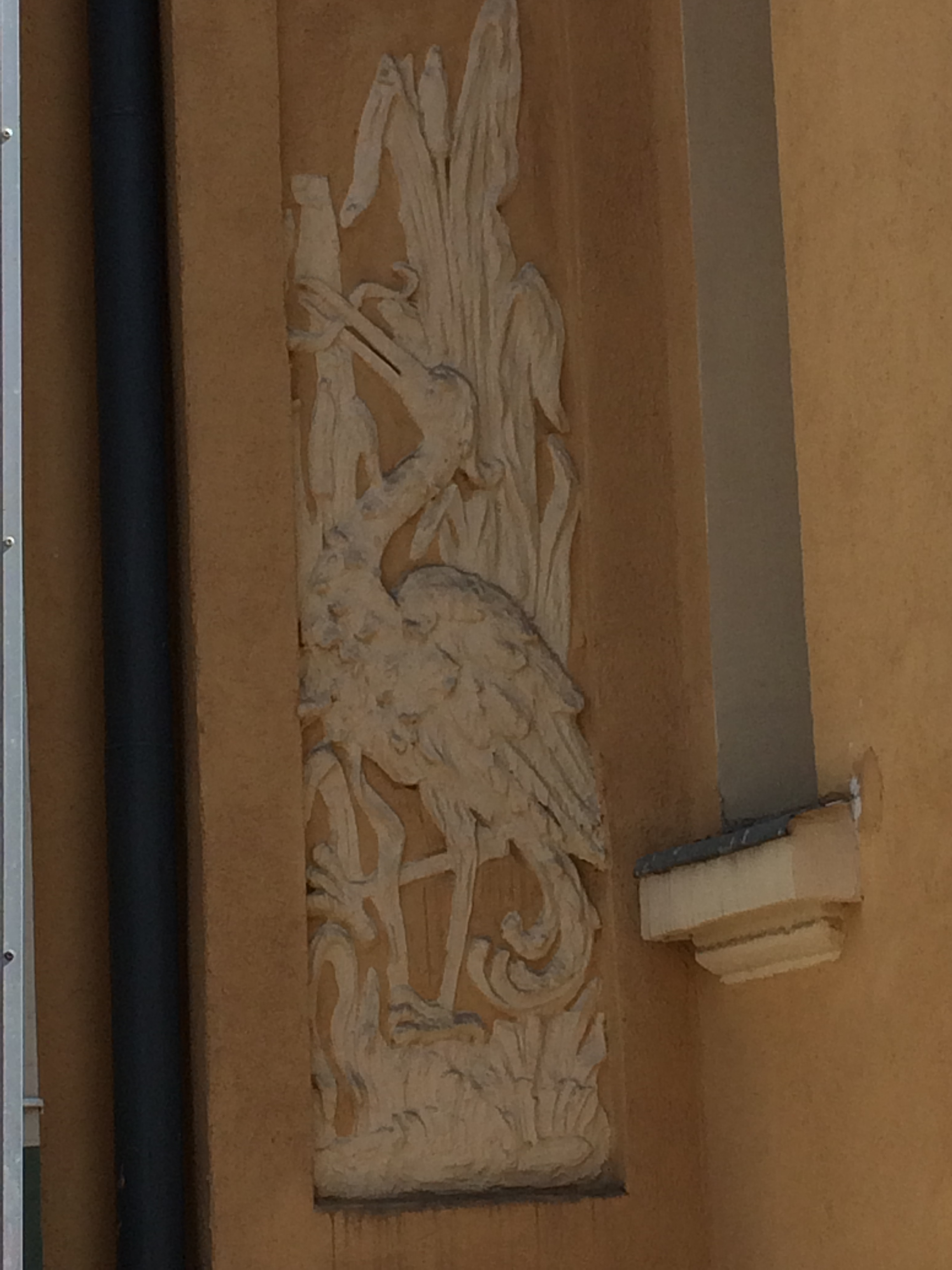
Heron in rushes

=== House at 9 ===
Registered on Kuyavian-Pomeranian Voivodeship Heritage List, Nr.601271-Reg.A/1107 (16 November 1993)

1900–1902, by Karl Bergner

Eclecticism, elements of Art Nouveau

The building was commissioned by a merchant, Ephreim Moritz. After World War II, the building became the property of the Treasury department. The present architectural state of the building is the result of a restoration work carried out in the 1990s.

The four-storey building with a mansard roof has a "U"-shape with outbuildings. The front elevation is asymmetrical, with two avant-corps topped with terraces. The left avant-corps is surmounted by a gable adorned with bas-relief stuccoes: scenes depict allegorical female figures with an owl and a rooster, symbolising "Day and Night". A form of a female head is placed in the portal pediment.

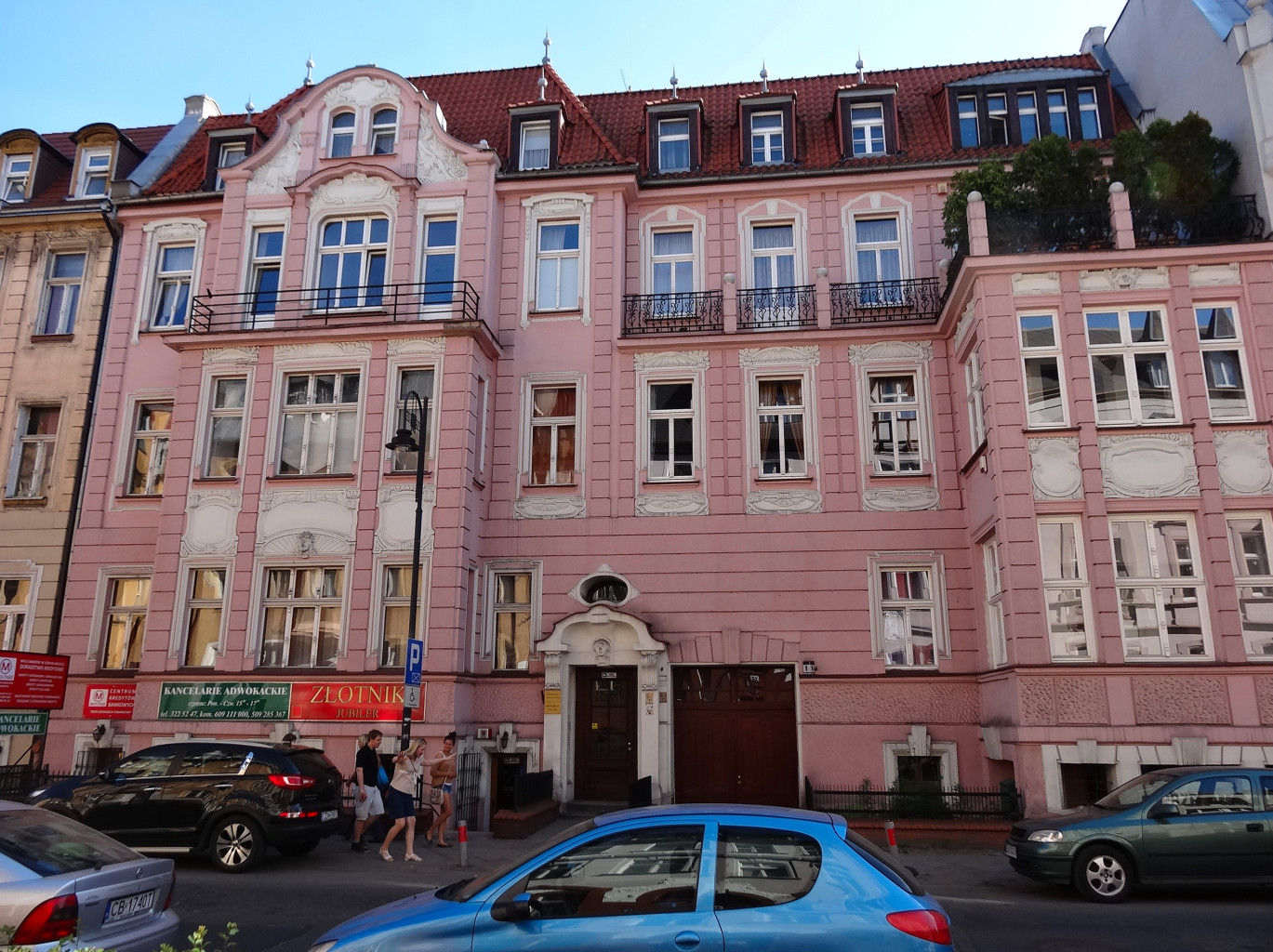
Main facade

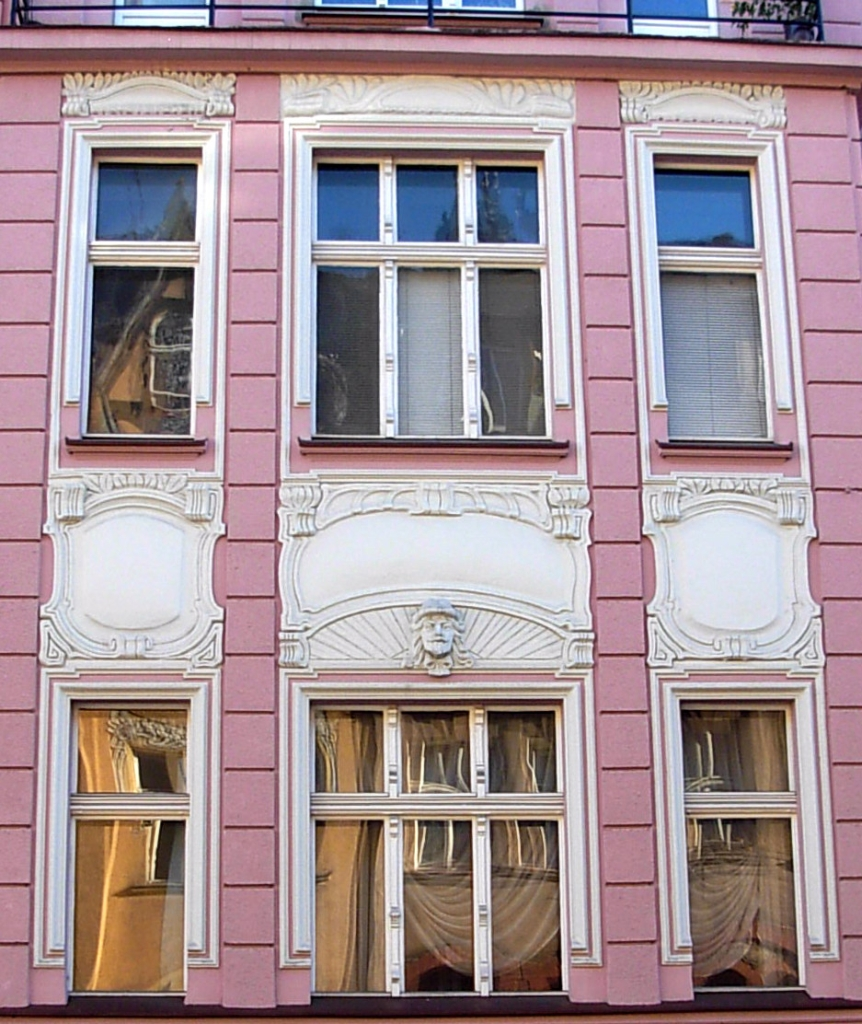
Stucco ornaments

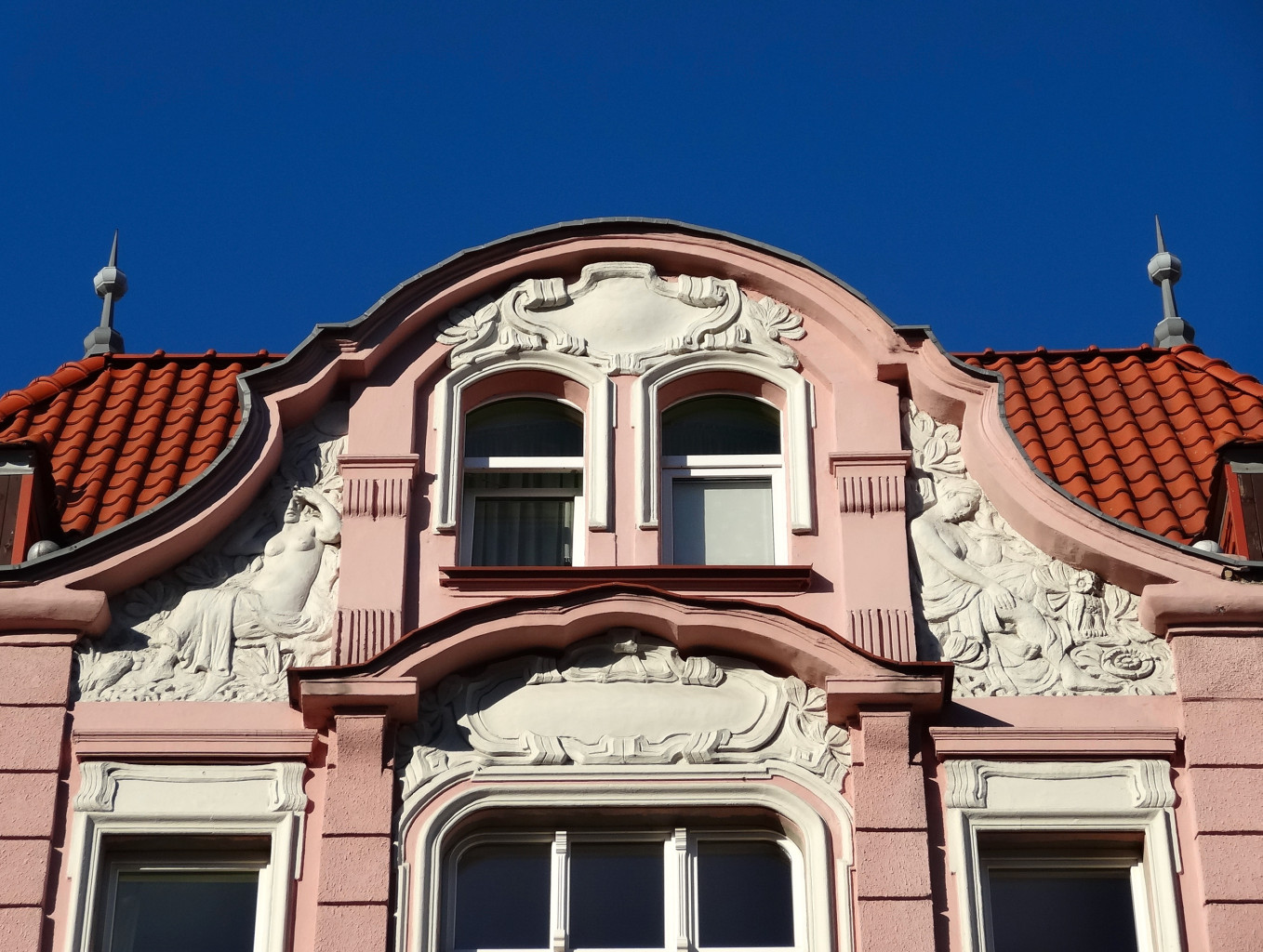
Stucco allegorical female figures

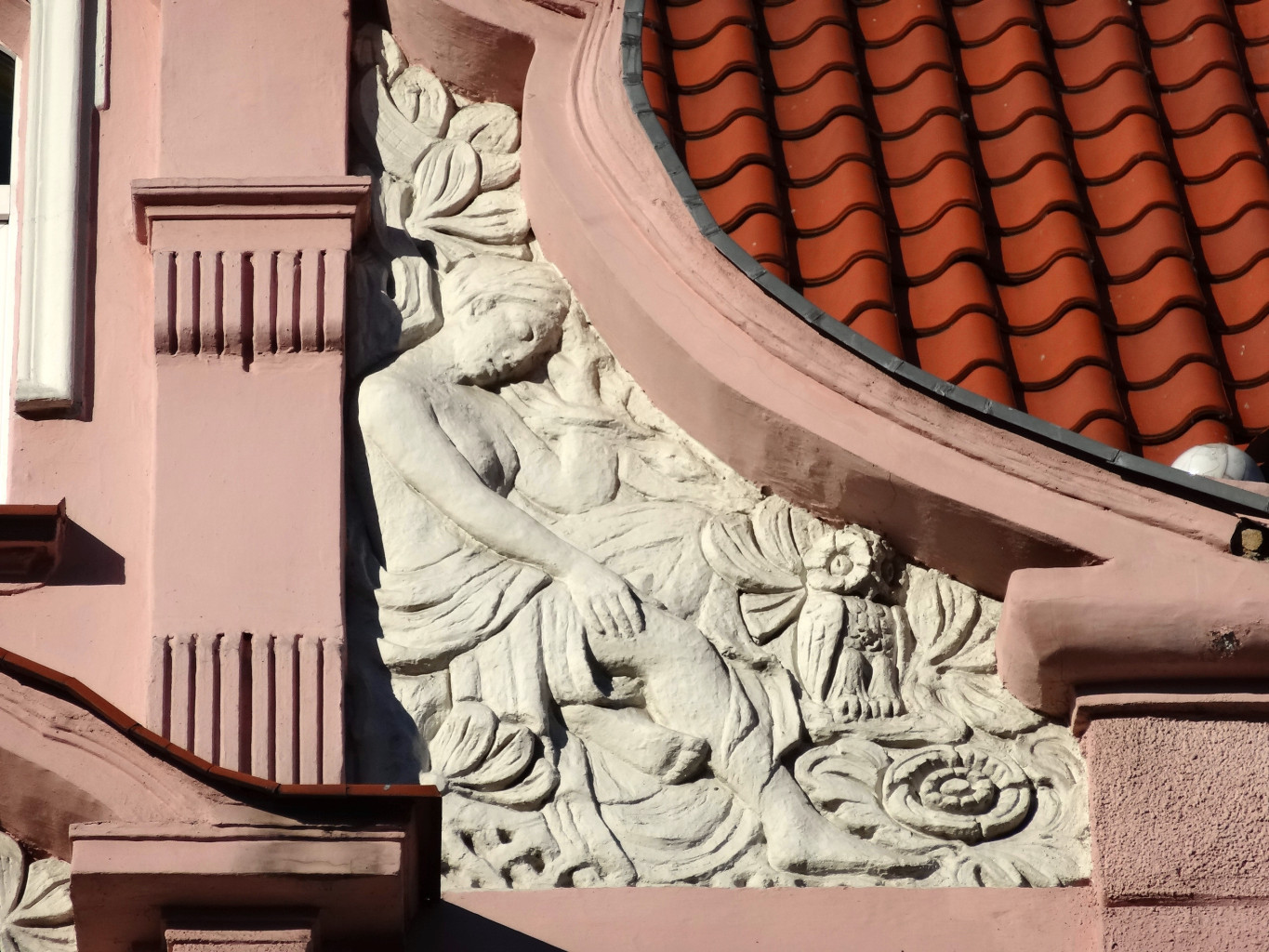
Detail

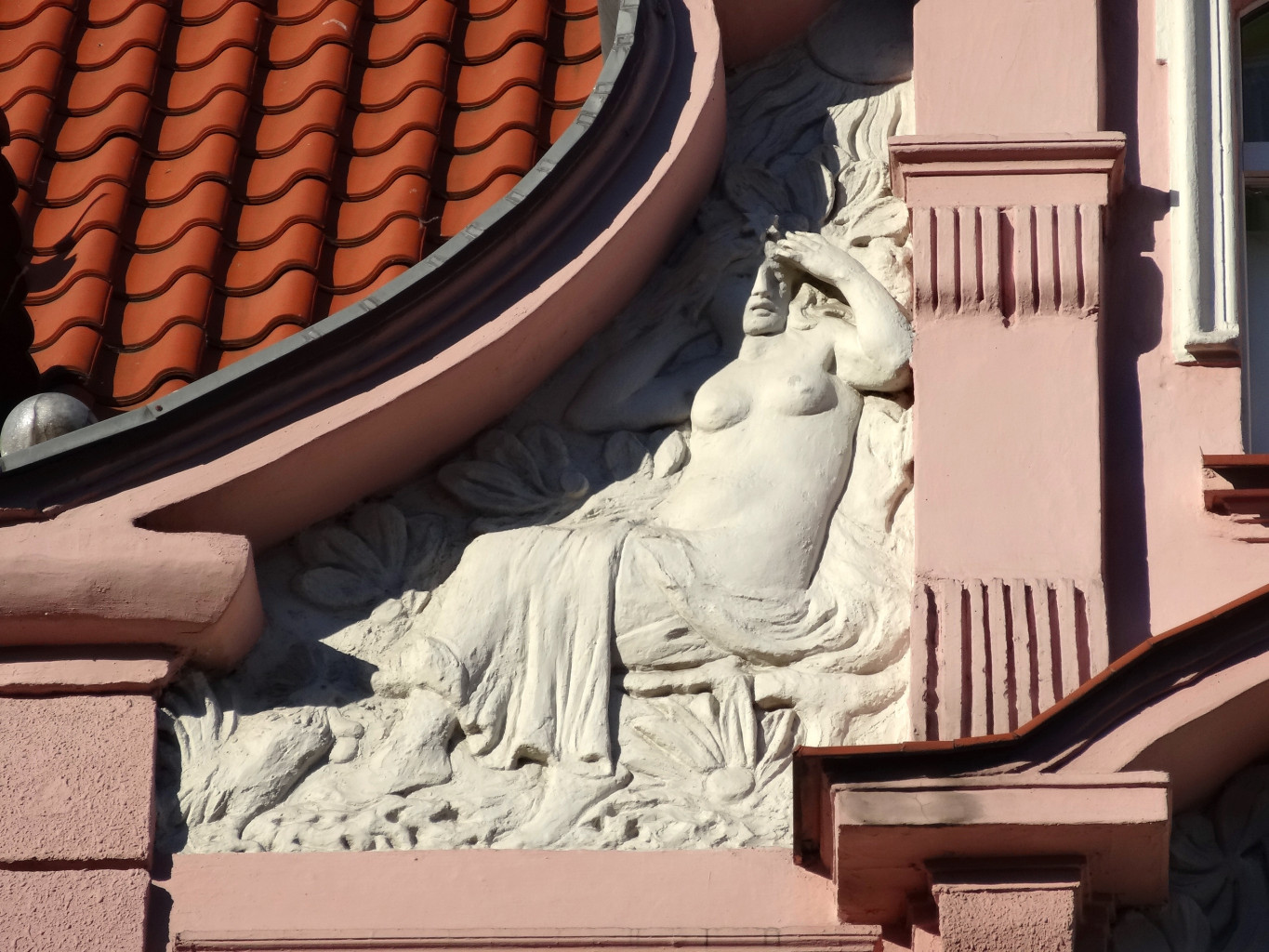
Detail

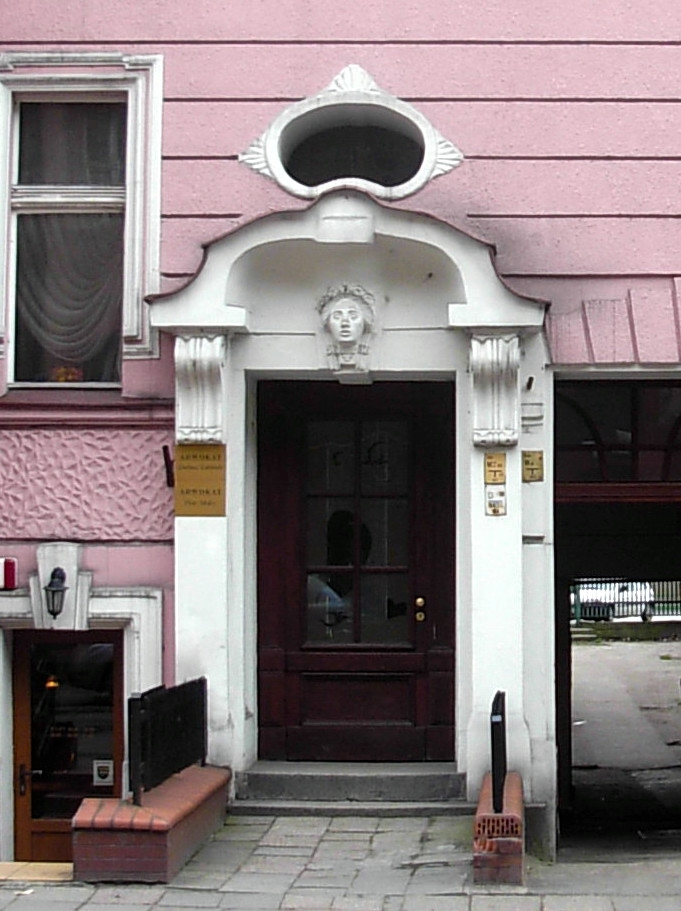
Gate Detail
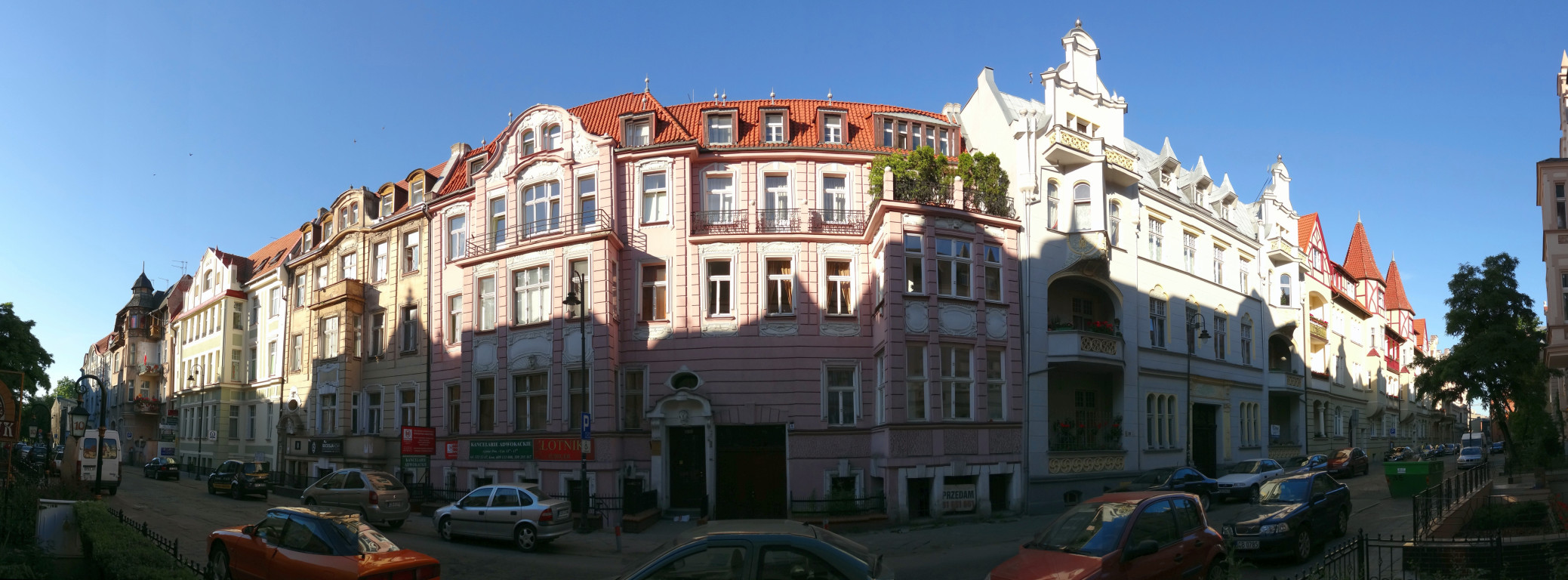
Panorama of Cieszkowskiego St.9 frontage

=== House at 10 ===
1902–1903, by Rudolf Kern & Józef Święcicki

Eclecticism, elements of Art Nouveau

The plot where stands the house belonged to Józef Święcicki: he sold it in 1902, to his colleague Rudolf Kern. Rudolf Kern designed many other edifices in Bydgoszcz, among others:

- His own house at Mickiewicz Alley 1;
- Buildings in Gdańska Street (Nr.5, 24, 66/68, 67, 71, 158);
- Buildings in Zamoyski street (11, 15);
- Buildings in January 20th street (2, 16, 18, 24).

In 1906, the house was sold to Albert Jahnke, a merchant.

The four-storey building with a loft has an inverted "T" shape . The front elevation is topped with a triangular, timbered gable and a conical tented Mansard roof. The entrance opening is decorated with flower volutes stuccoes.

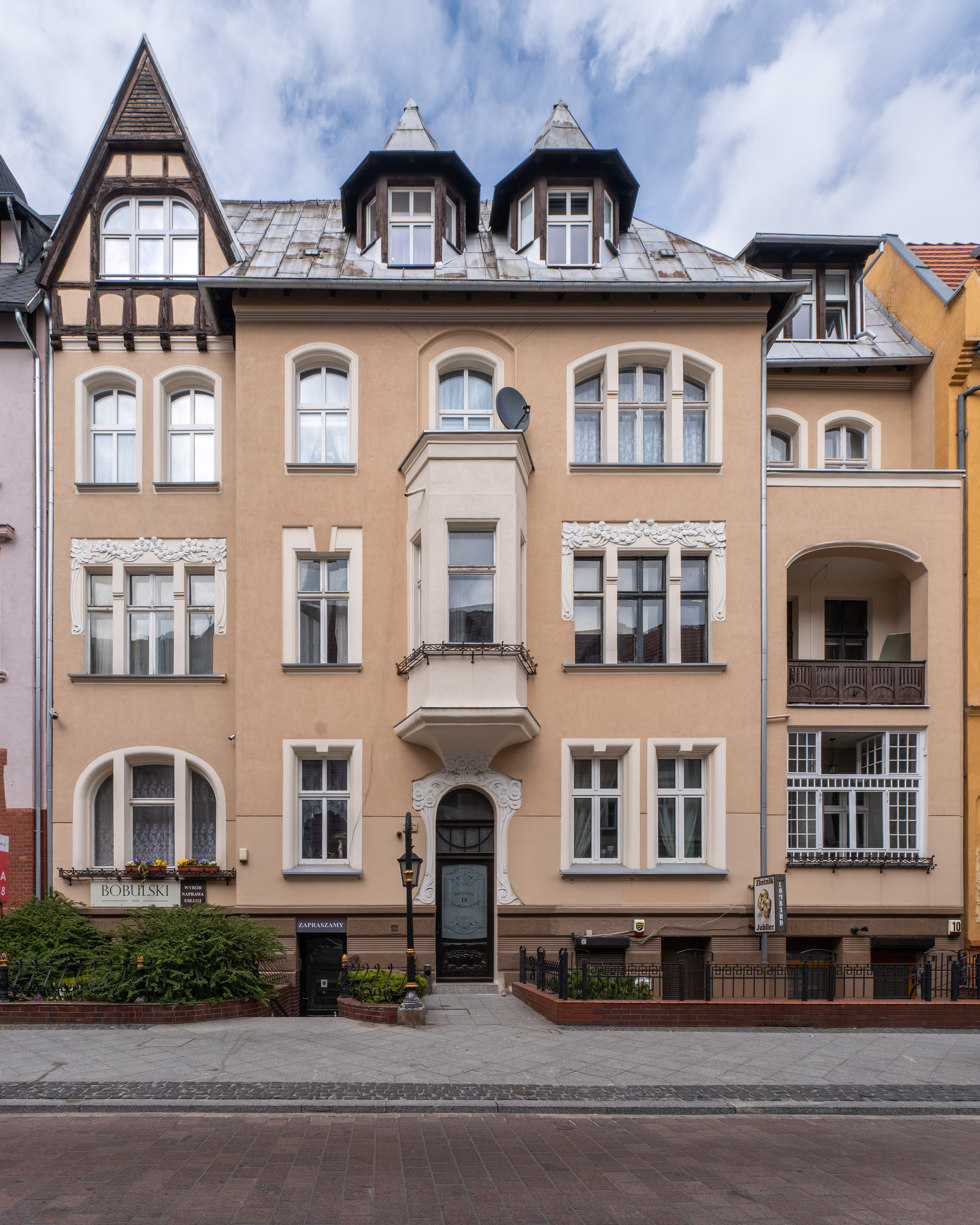
Main facade

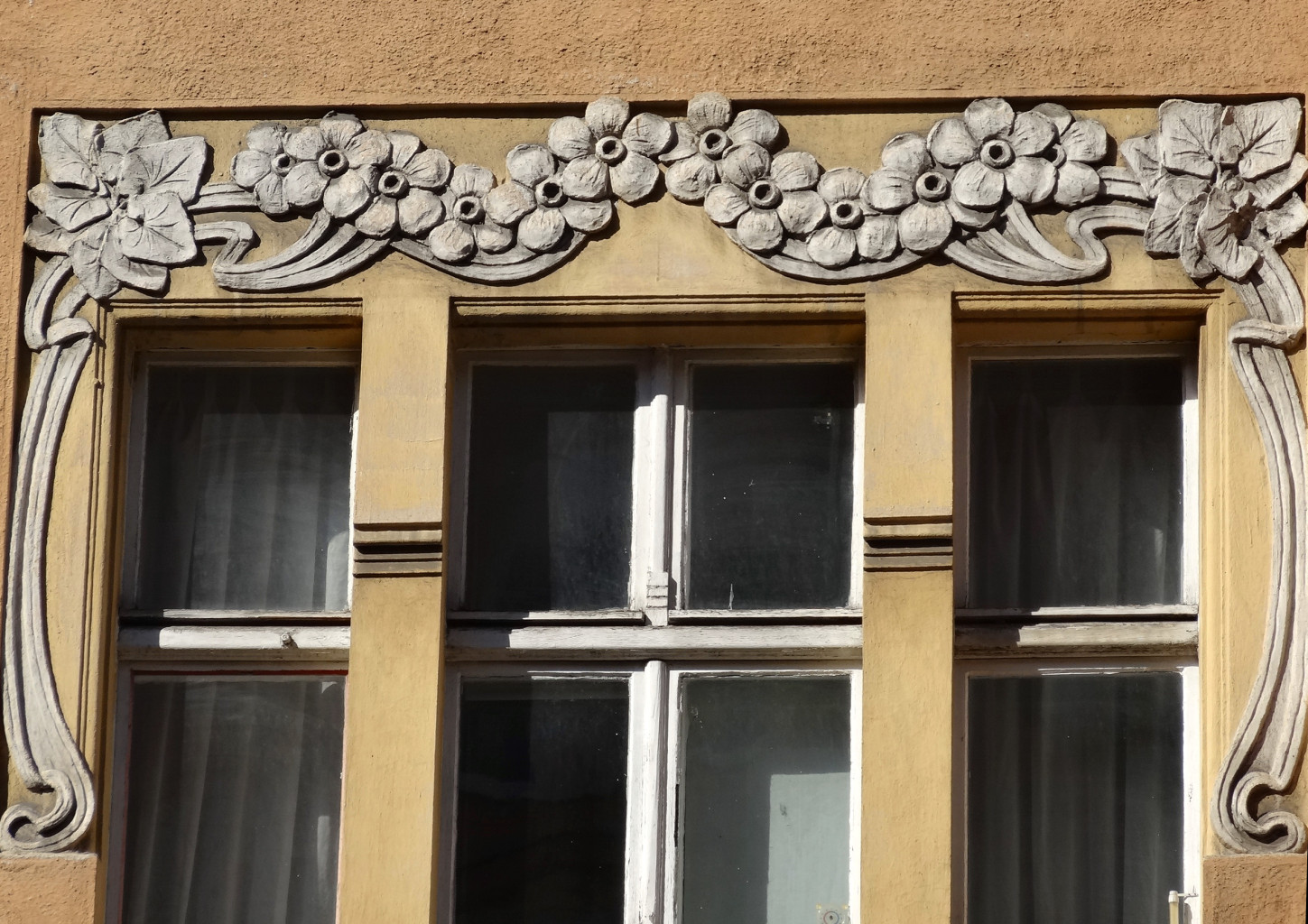
Stucco ornaments

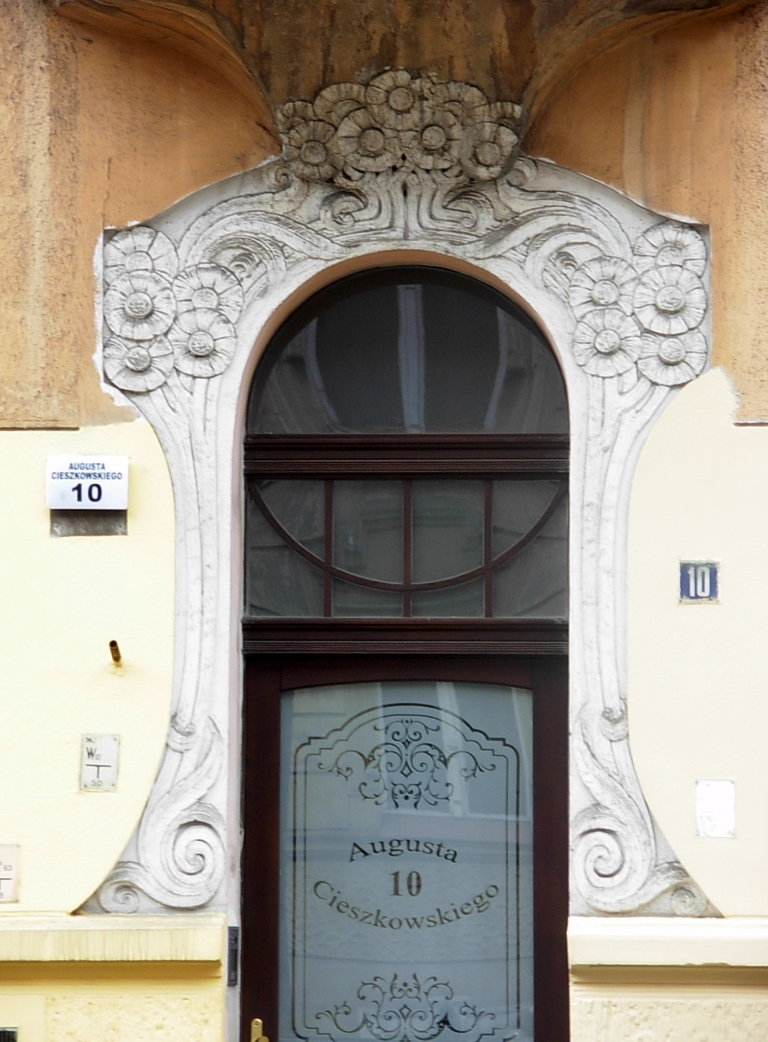
Gate Detail

=== Gustav Reschke's house at11 ===
Registered on Kuyavian-Pomeranian Voivodeship Heritage List, Nr.601272-Reg.A/1108 (16 November 1993)

1898–1899, by Józef Święcicki

Eclecticism & elements of Neo-Gothic

The building was erected on behalf of Gustav Reschke, a rentier. The construction was carried out by master mason Emil Heidemann and master carpenter Friedrich Lork. In 1902, the house at Moltkestrasse 16 was purchased by its builder Józef Święcicki, aspiring to rebuild the interiors. The building has been thoroughly restored during the 1990s and after 2000.

The four-storey building with residential attics has a "U" footprint with two outbuilding wings. The front elevation is symmetrical, flanked by two-storey loggias, topped by triangular bay windows surmounted by balconies. Slight avant-corps can be noticed, capped by gables with semicircular pediments. Bay windows of the second floor are adorned with plant decoration and heraldic cartouches, including a woman head, Bydgoszcz coat of arms, a cog and a head of Hercules. The portal frame displays an allegorical scene with putti blowing clouds, as a symbol of stripping away worries of home residents. The building has preserved most of its original woodwork and windows decoration, but only part of its stuccoes in the residential area.

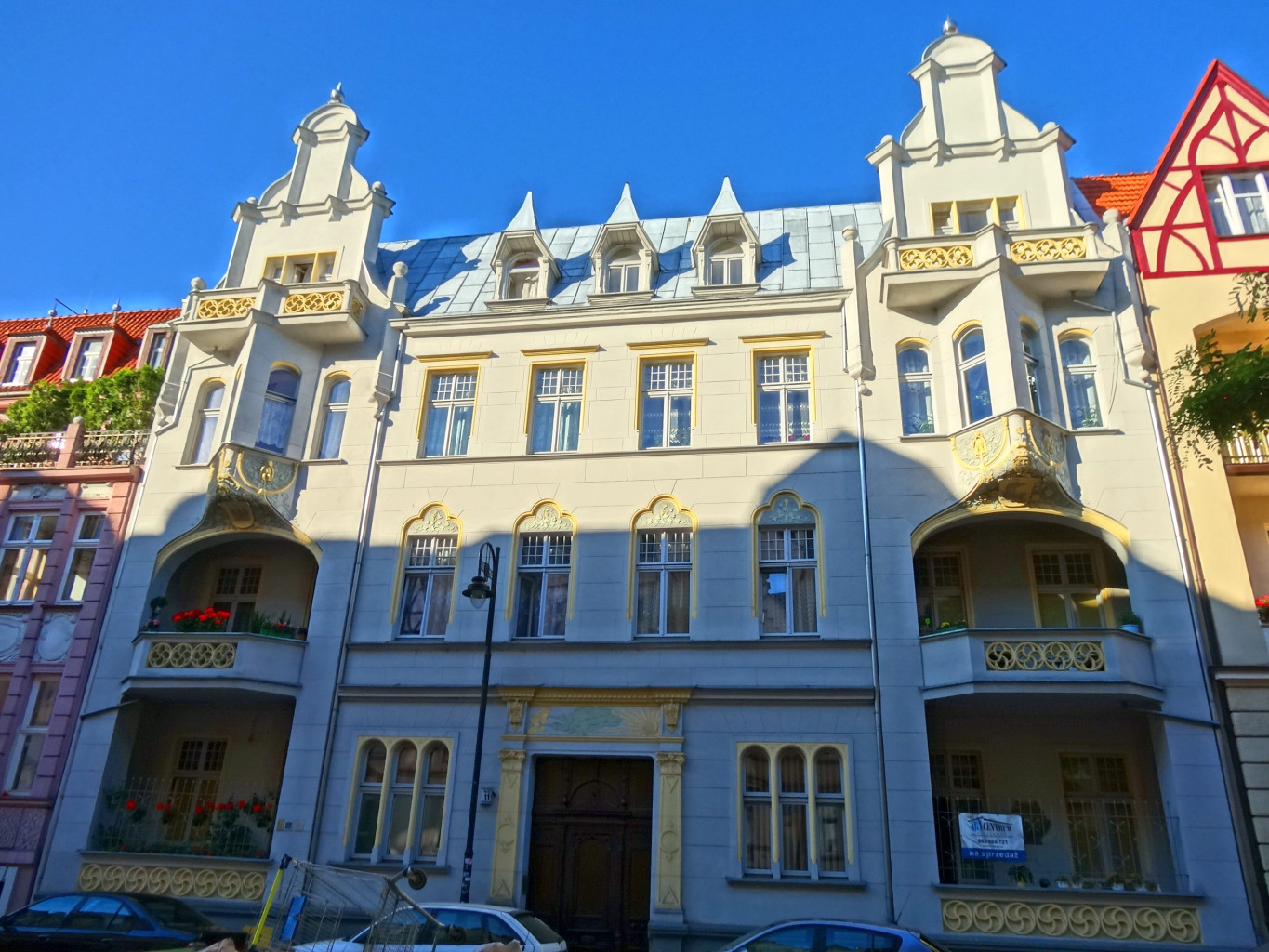
Main facade

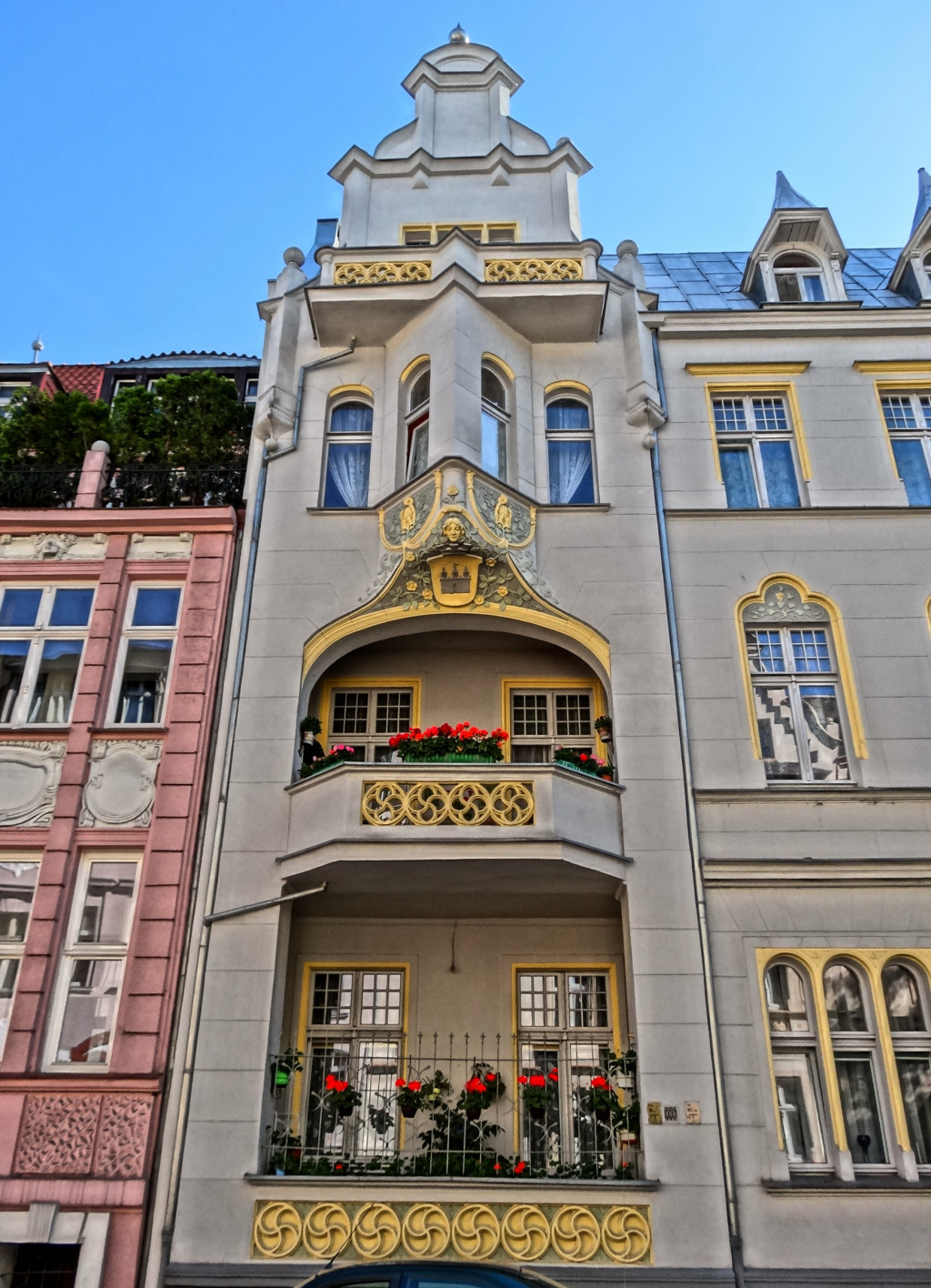
A two-storey loggia

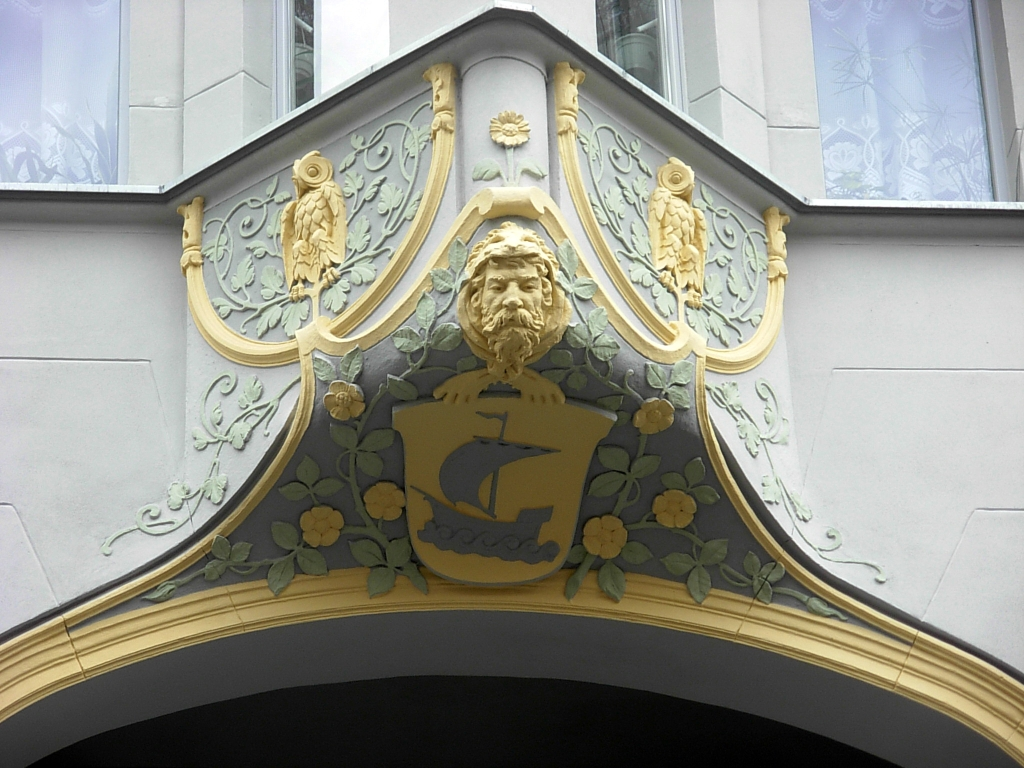
Bay window ornament with a cog and a head of Hercules

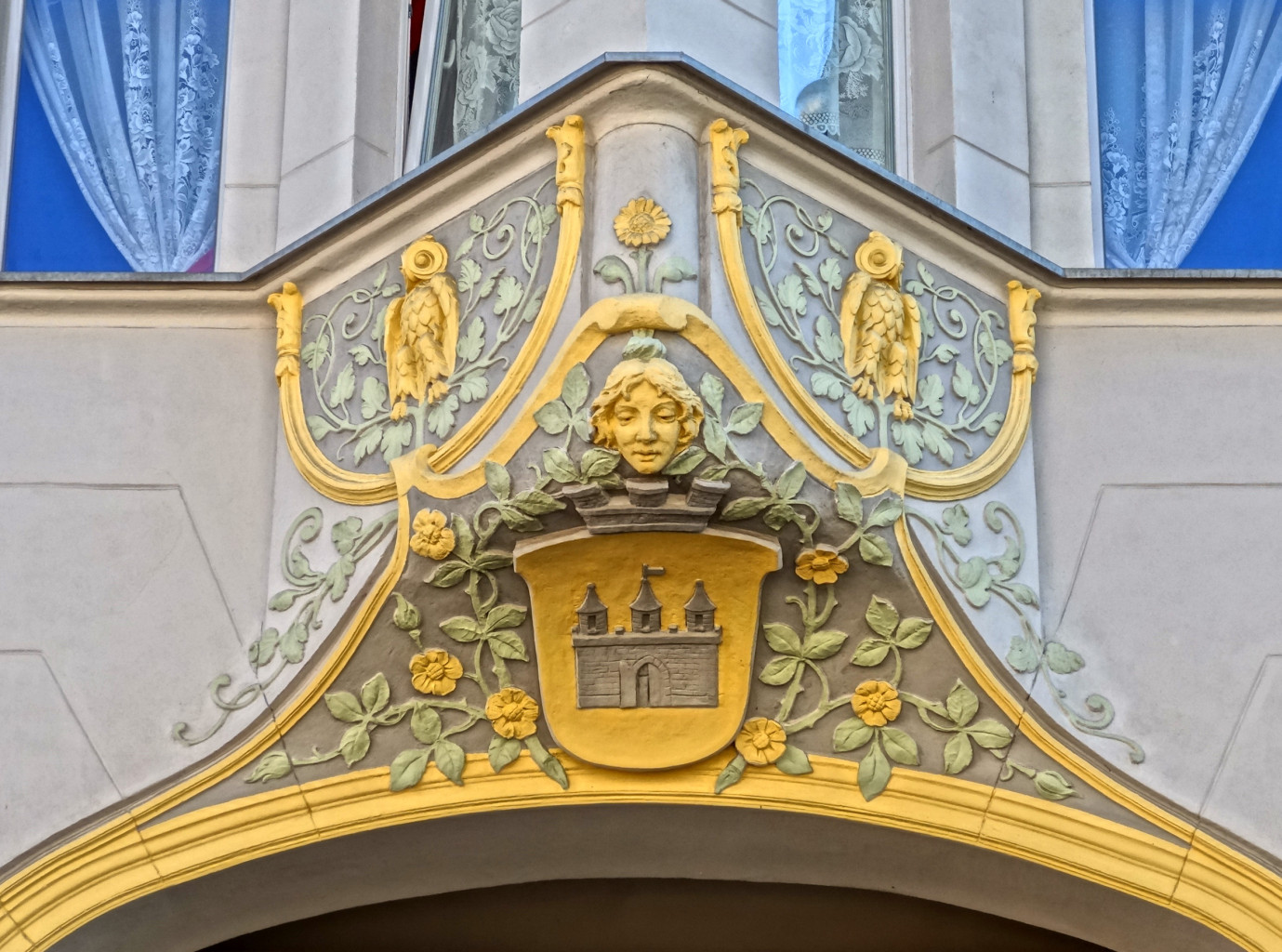
Bay window ornament with a woman head and Bydgoszcz coat of arms

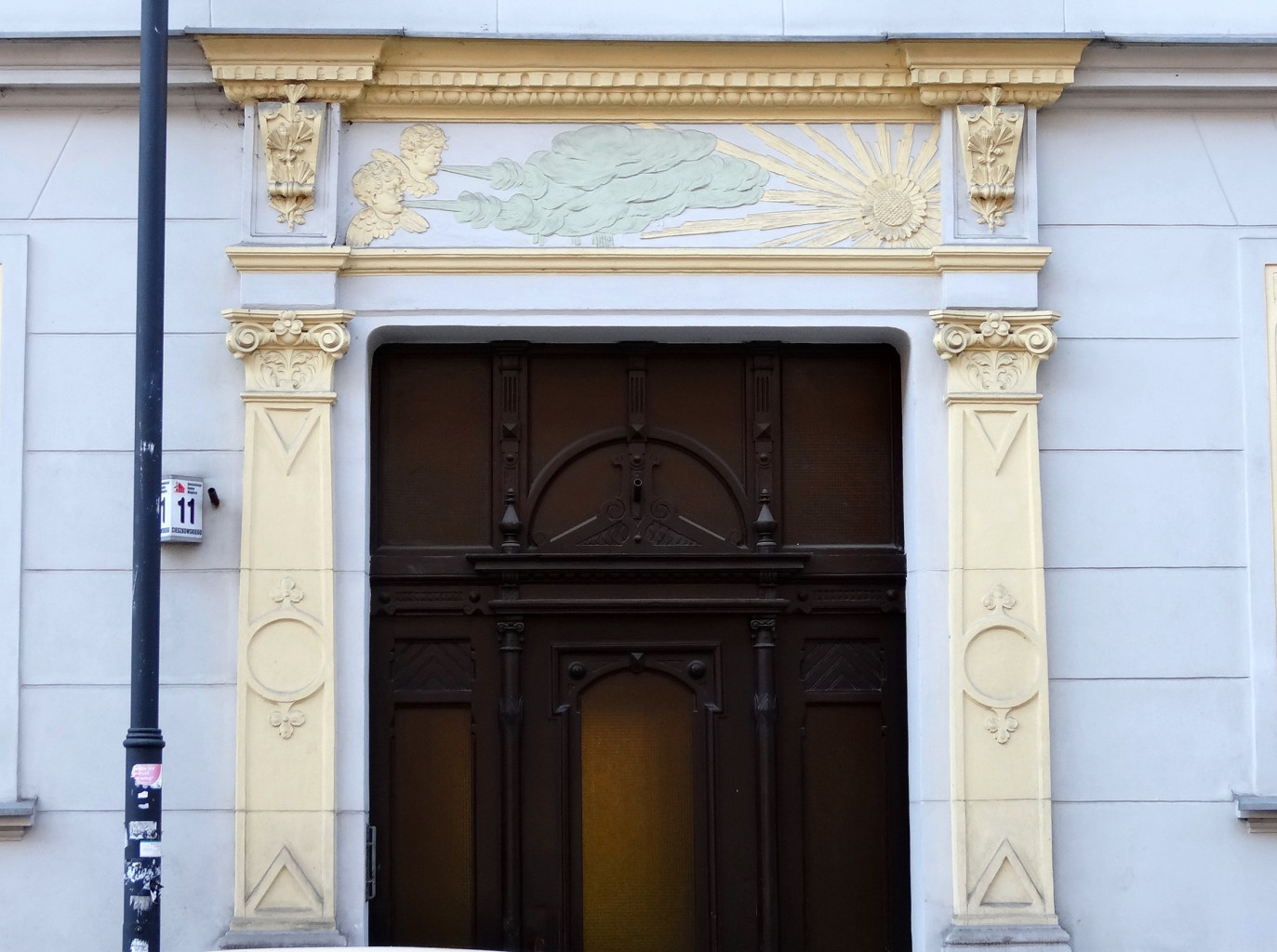
Portal frame detail with putti

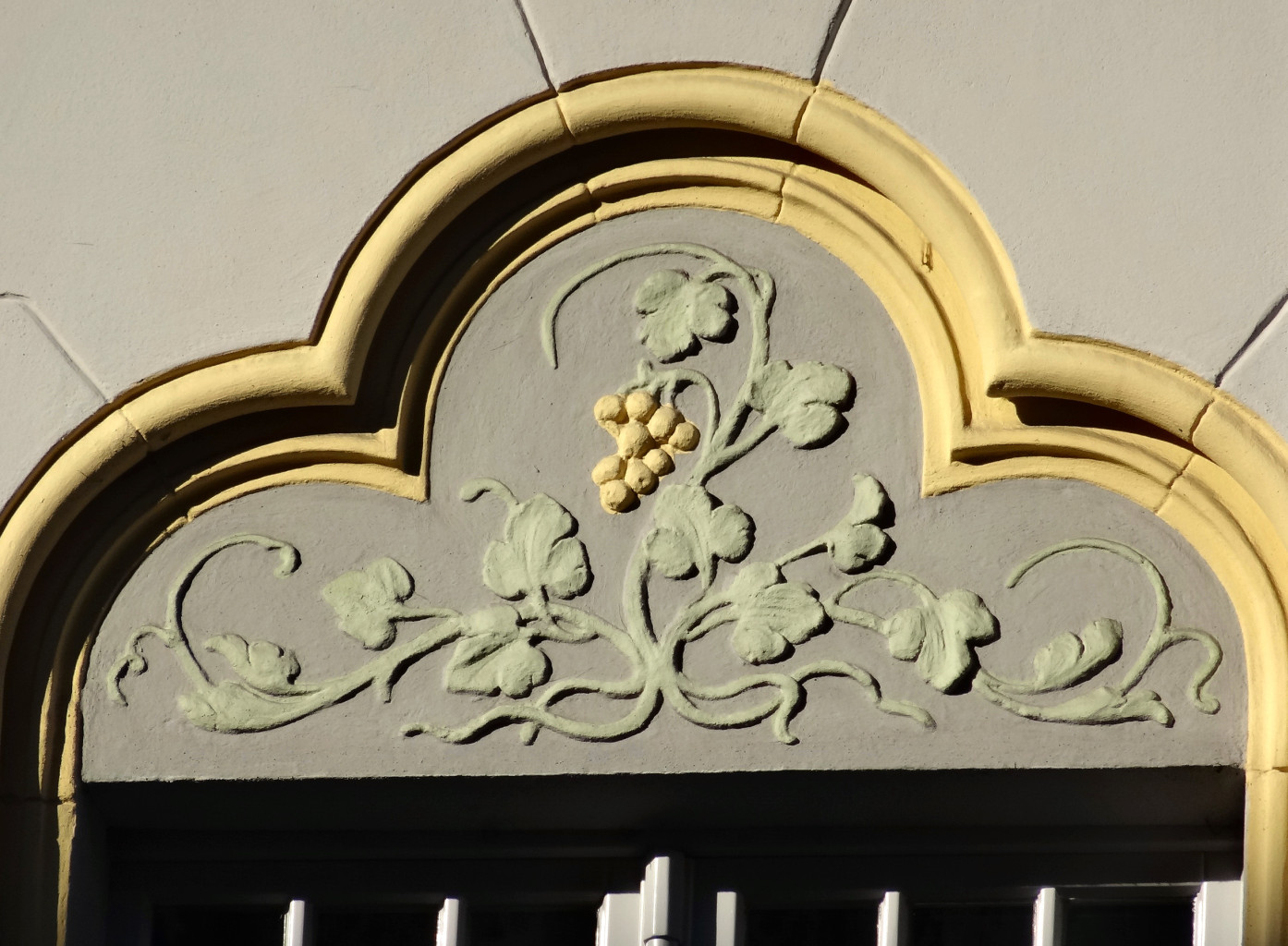
Window decoration detail

=== House at 12 ===
Registered on Kuyavian-Pomeranian Voivodeship Heritage List, Nr.725834-Reg.A/1524 (17 April 2006)

1902–1903, by Rudolf Kern & Victor Petrikowski

Eclecticism & elements of Art Nouveau

In 1915, the building was purchased by Rudolf Frisch, a rentier, who had the veranda added. The present facade of the building is the result of restoration works carried out in 2010.

The four-storey building with has "T" shape. The left top of the front facade has a small avant-corps crowned by a gable. The roof has embedded shed dormers, those on the right end being covered with a tented roof. The lower tier displays brick masonry. The opening above the entrance hole is decorated with Art Nouveau ornamentation: stylized chestnut leaves and a head of a woman.

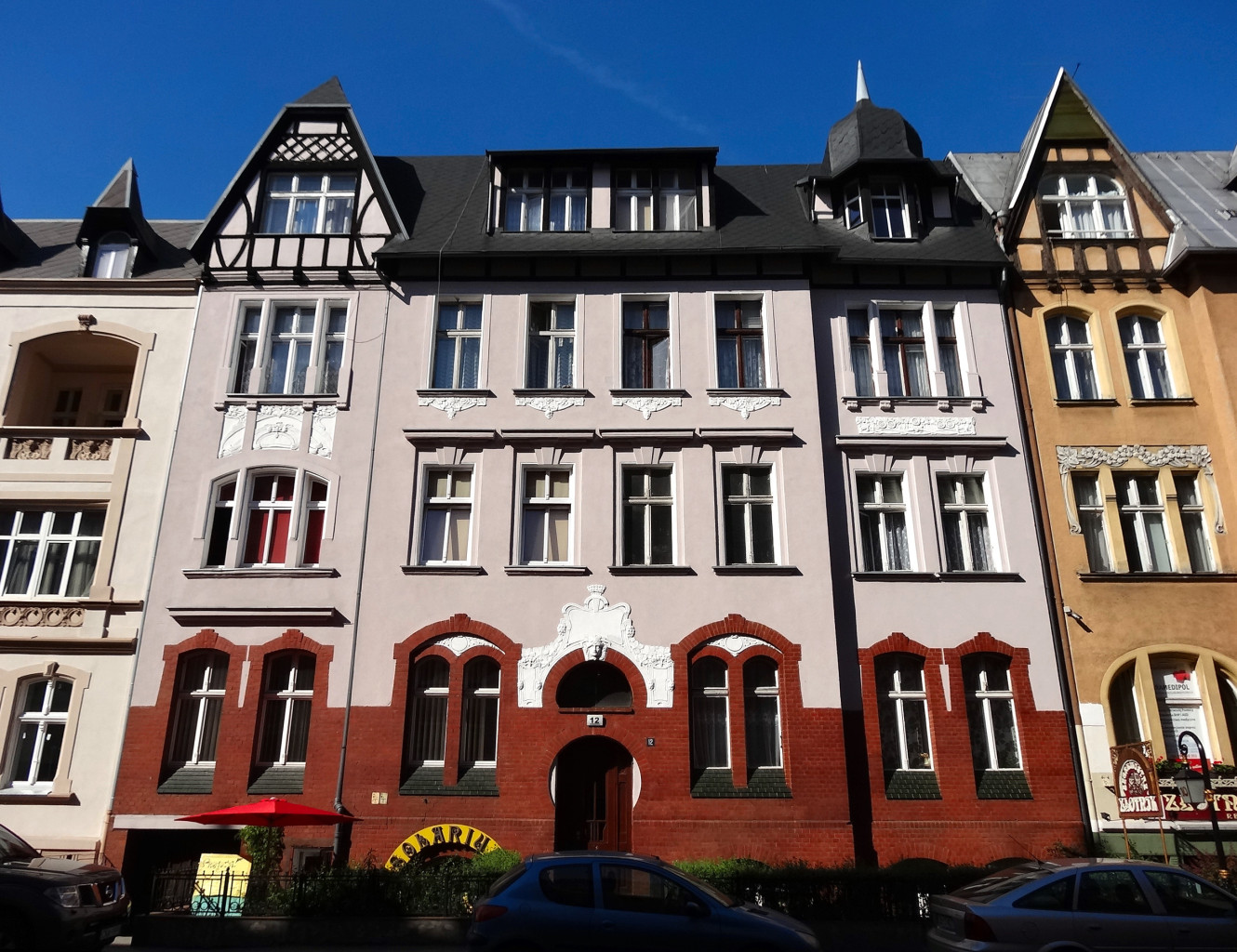
Main facade

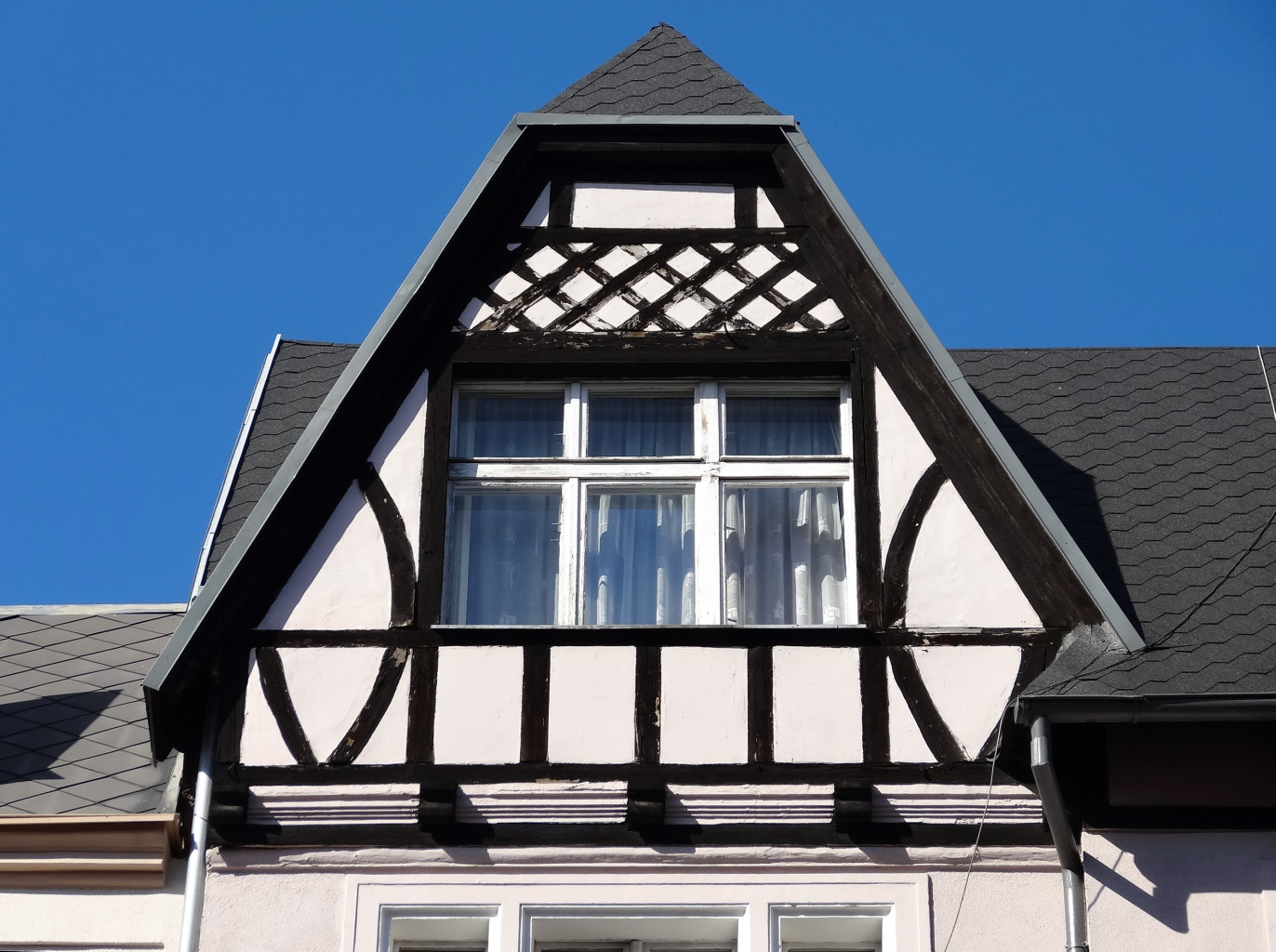
Upper avant-corps

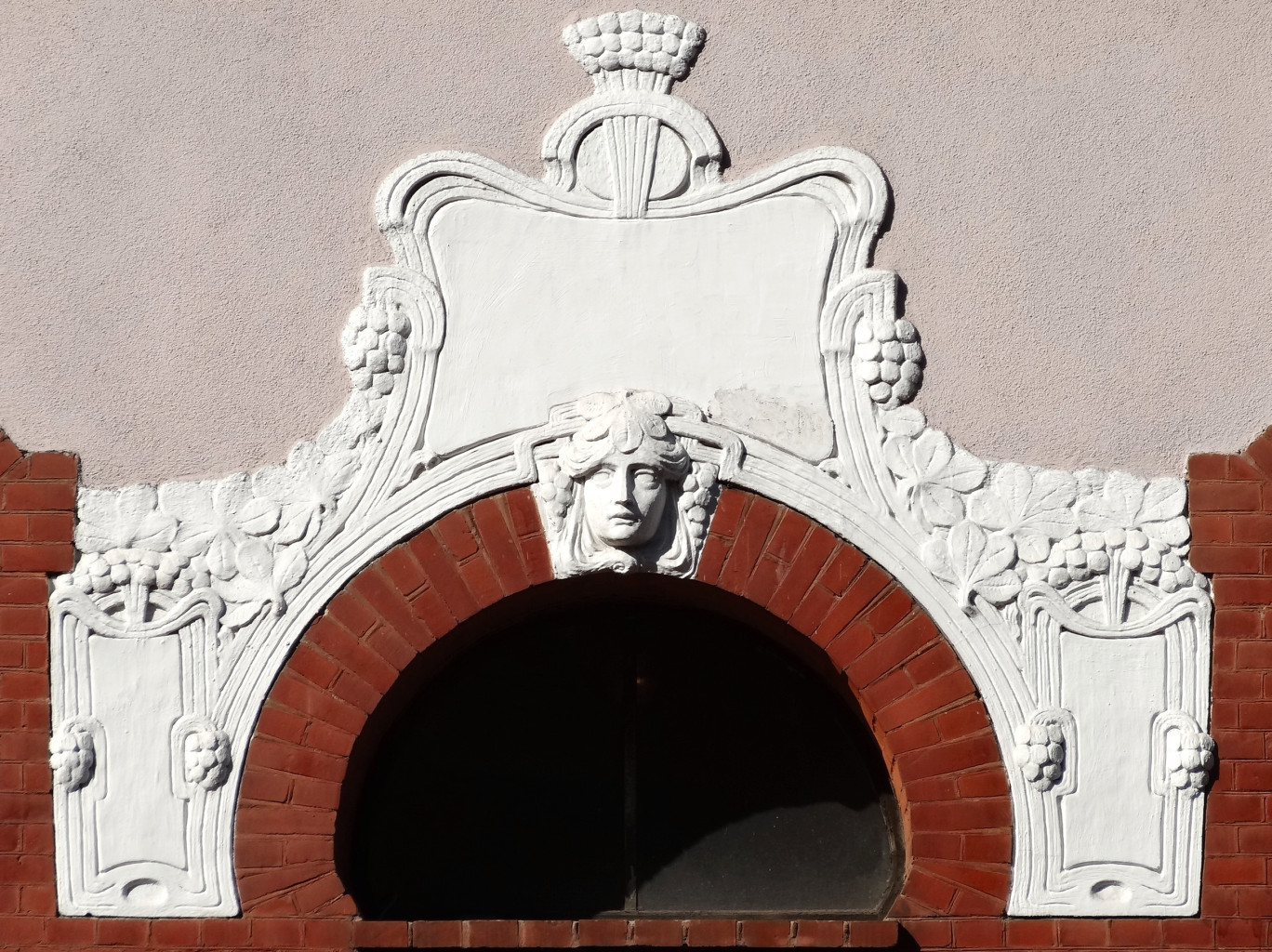
Portal frame detail

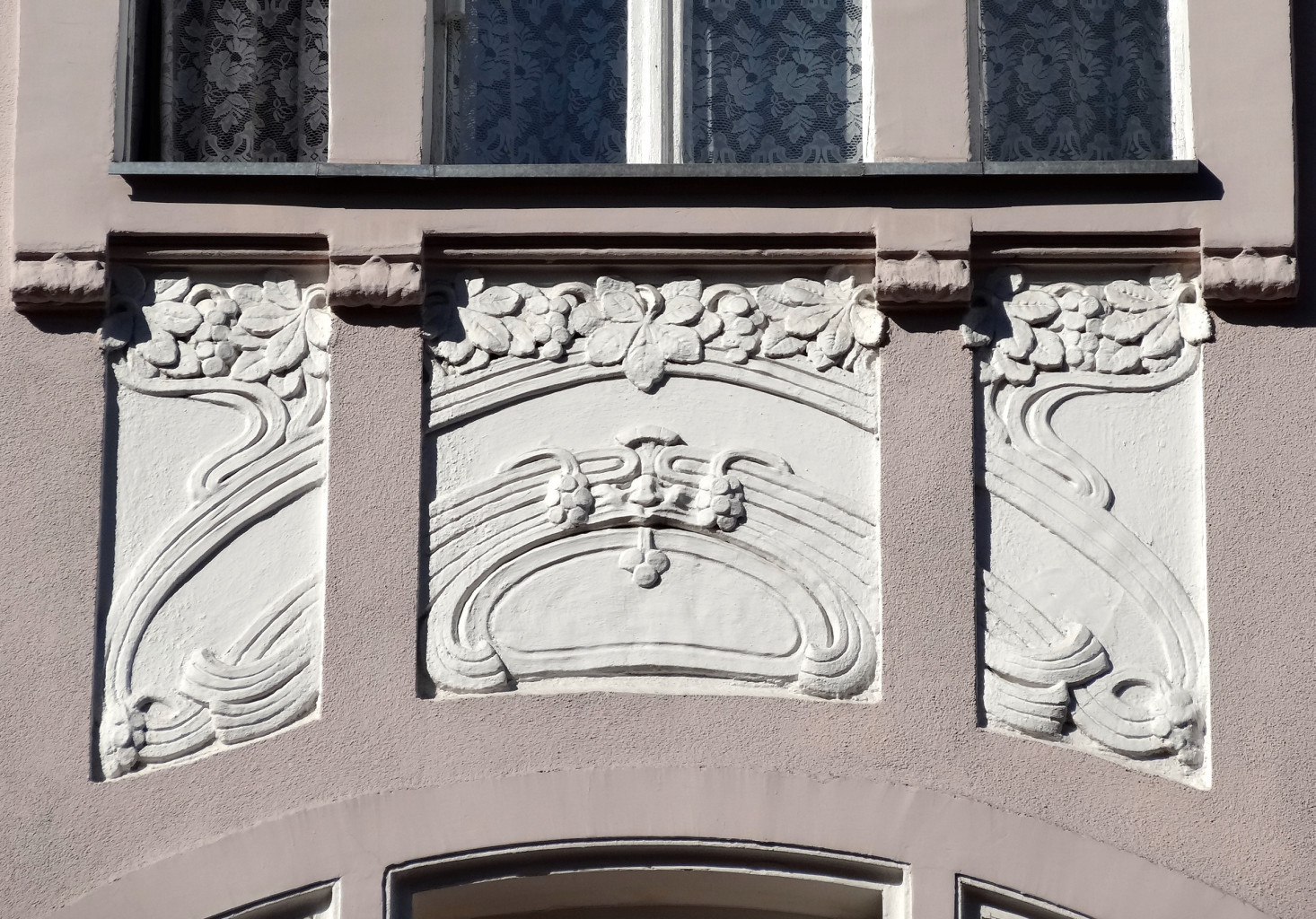
Facade decoration detail
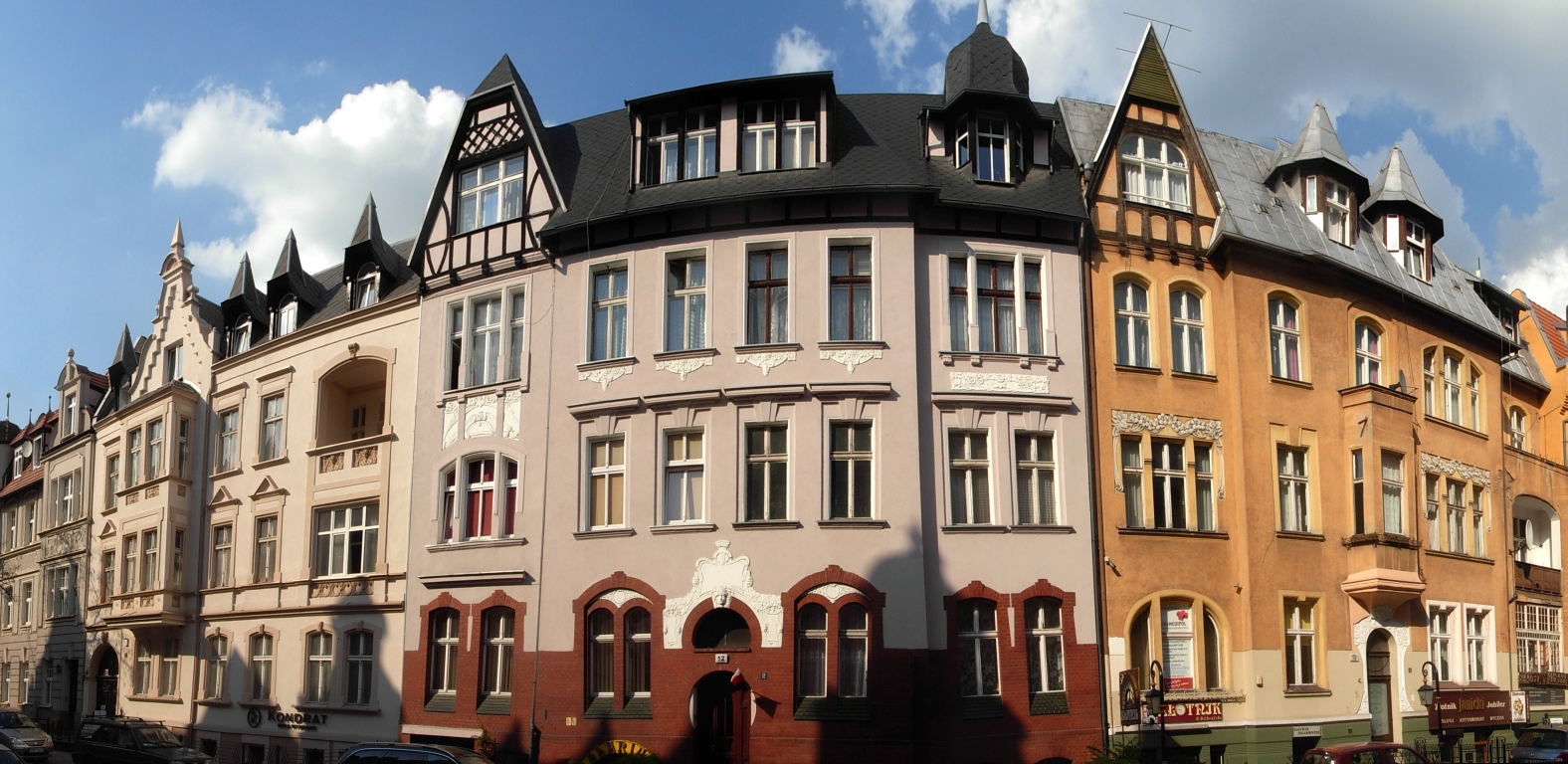
Panorama on Nr.10 and 12 facades

=== Houses at 13/15 ===
Registered on Kuyavian-Pomeranian Voivodeship Heritage List, Nr.601273-Reg.A/1109 (17 November 1993)

1902–1903, by Fritz Weidner

Eclecticism & elements of Art Nouveau

The building was commissioned by a Housing Firm (German: Wohnungsverein zu Bromberg GmbH). Fritz Weidner also designed in Bydgoszcz, among others in Gdańska Street:

- Villa Fritz Heroldt at Nr.119;
- Tenement at 91;
- House at 79;
- Max Rosenthal Tenement at 42;
- His own house at 34;
- George Sikorski Tenement at 31;
- Thomas Frankowski Tenement at 28;
- Ernst Mix tenement at 10.

After 1920 the building passed into the hands of a Housing company seating at Libelta street, and after World War II it has been owned by the Housing Cooperative of Bydgoszcz (Polish: Bydgoska Spółdzielnia Mieszkaniowa). During the postwar period the facade lost some decoration. Two deep restorations have been carried out, one in 1992 and one after 2000.

The house has got four storey, on a "U" shape with two elongated residential wings. The front elevation has two bay windows, each topped with an octagonal tented roof. In the central part of the facade are loggias: the first floor displays Tuscan order columns arcade, and the second level has got wooden pillars and a baluster railing. The four peak roofs are timbered made. The gate opening at Nr.13 is topped with a stucco of a woman's head, and the entrance at Nr.15 has a cartouche bearing "AD1903", surrounded by chestnut leaves.

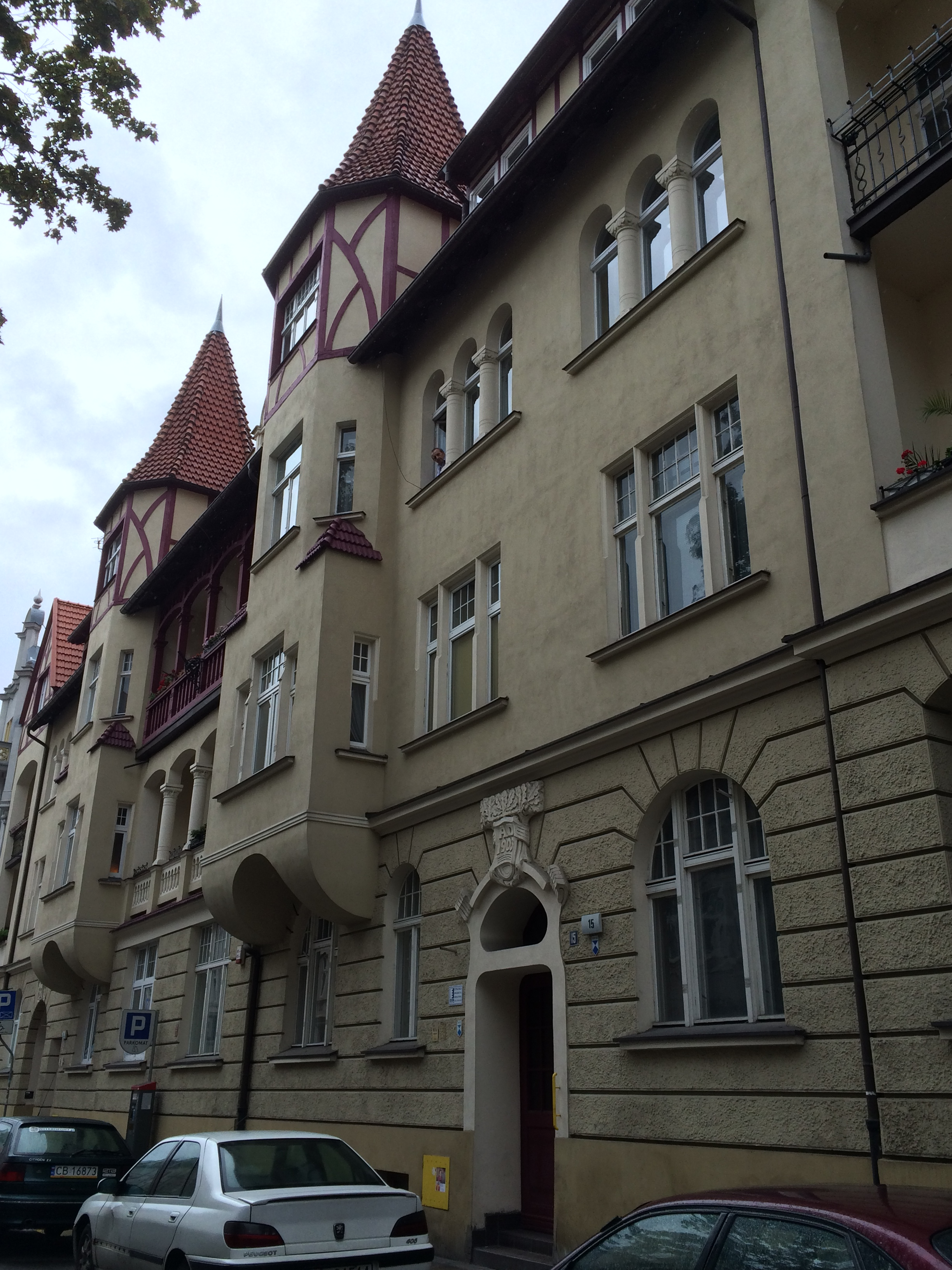
Main facade

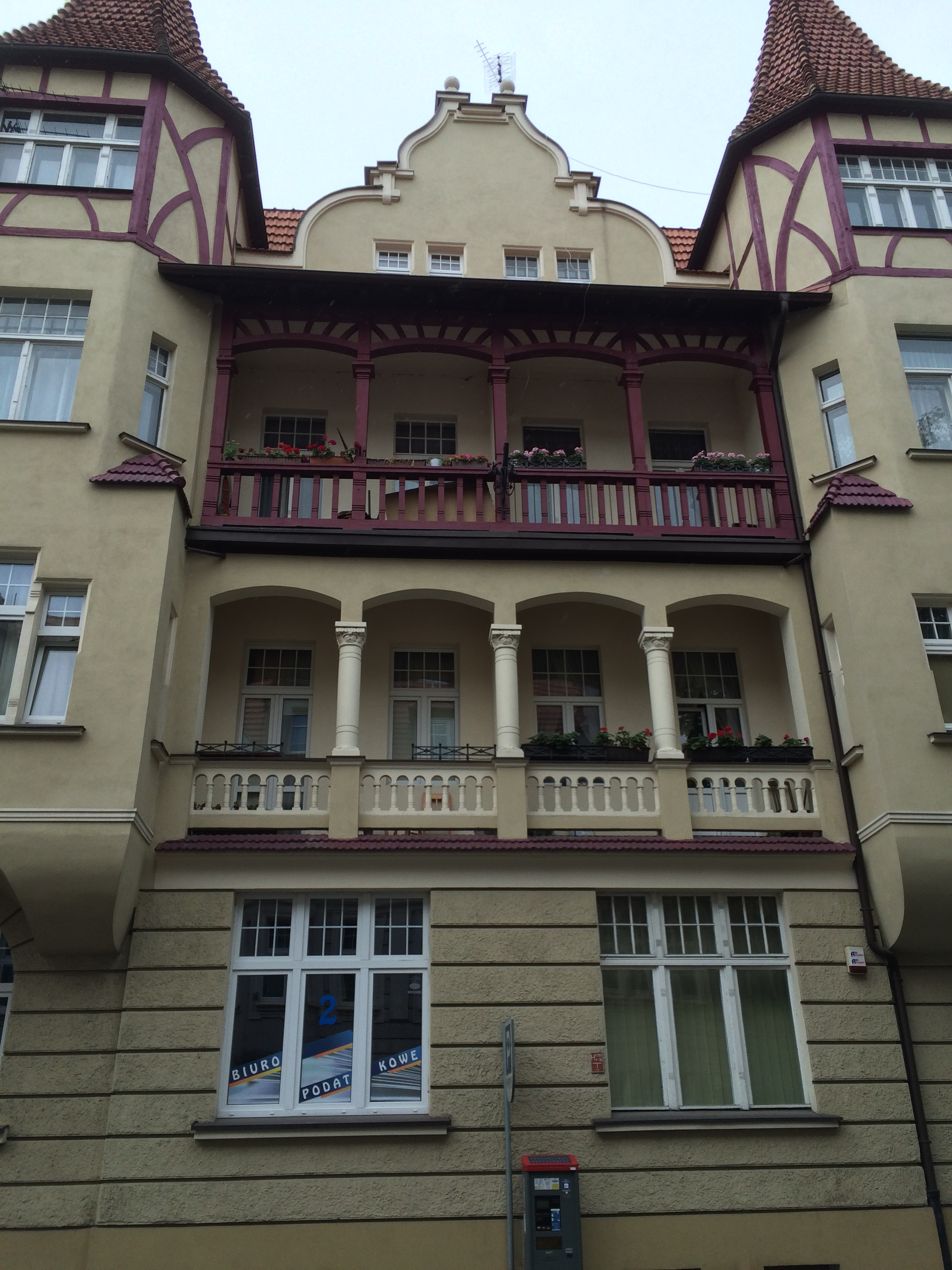
Loggias of the facade

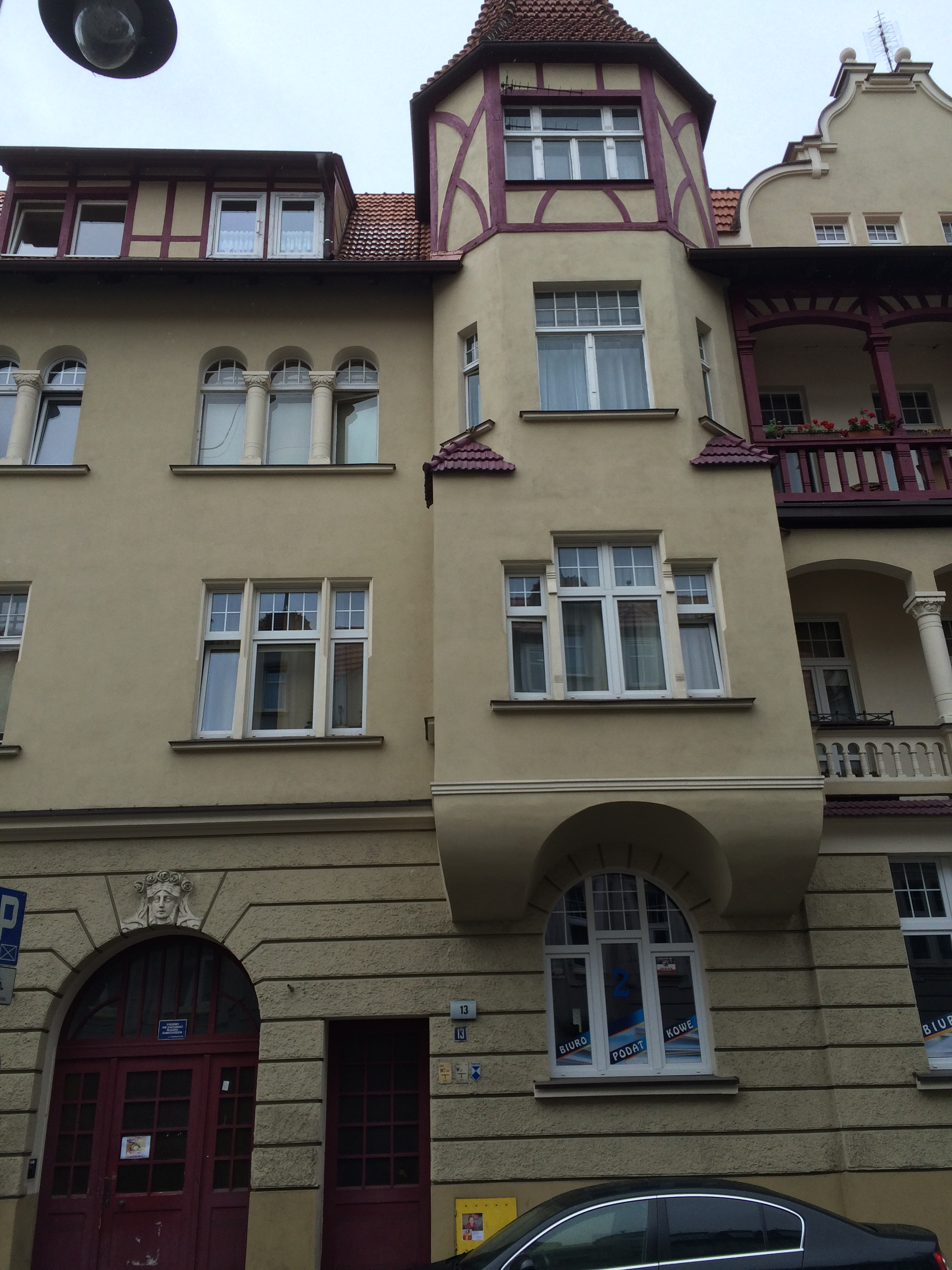
Avant-corps at 13

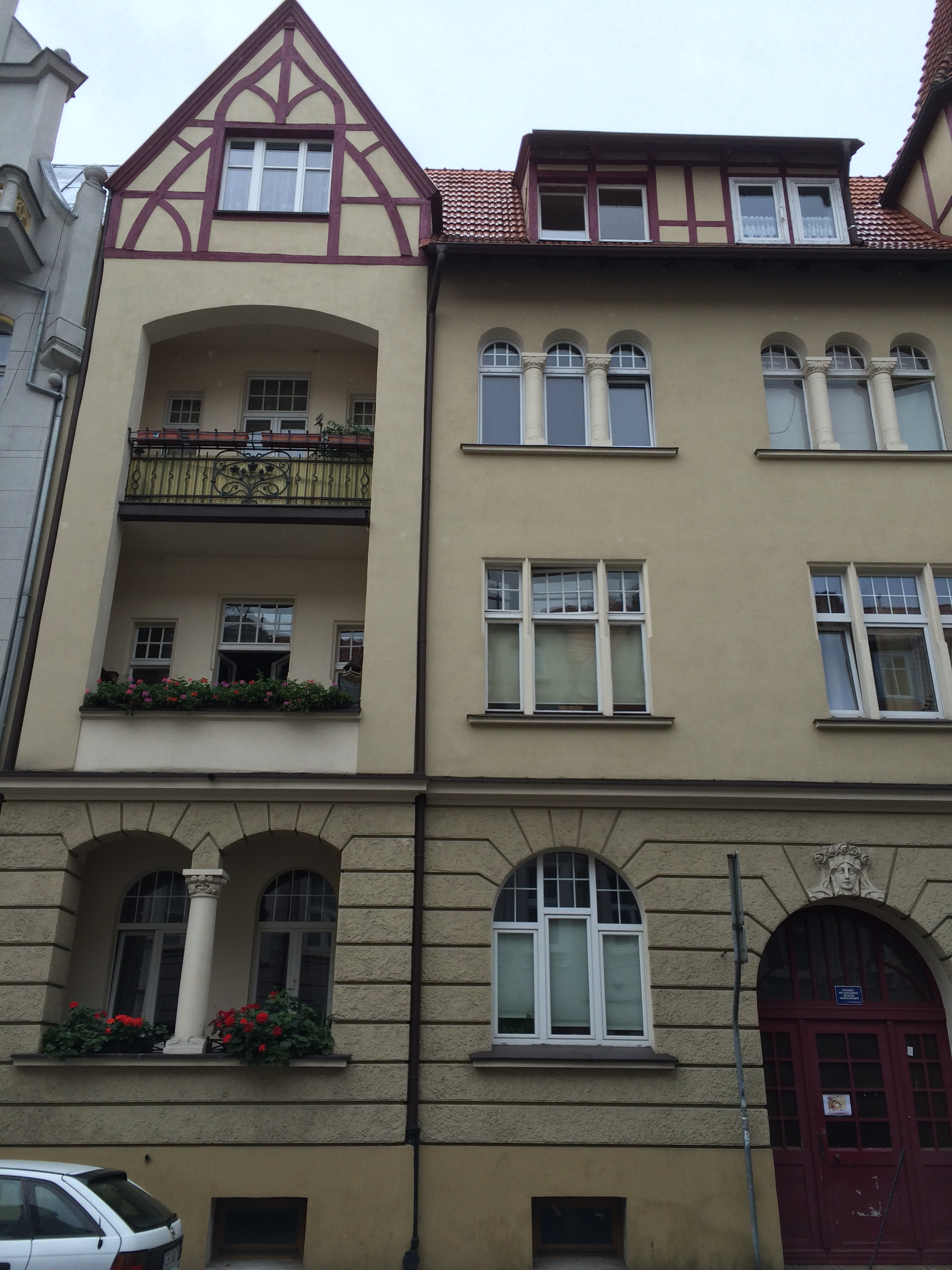
Loggia at 13

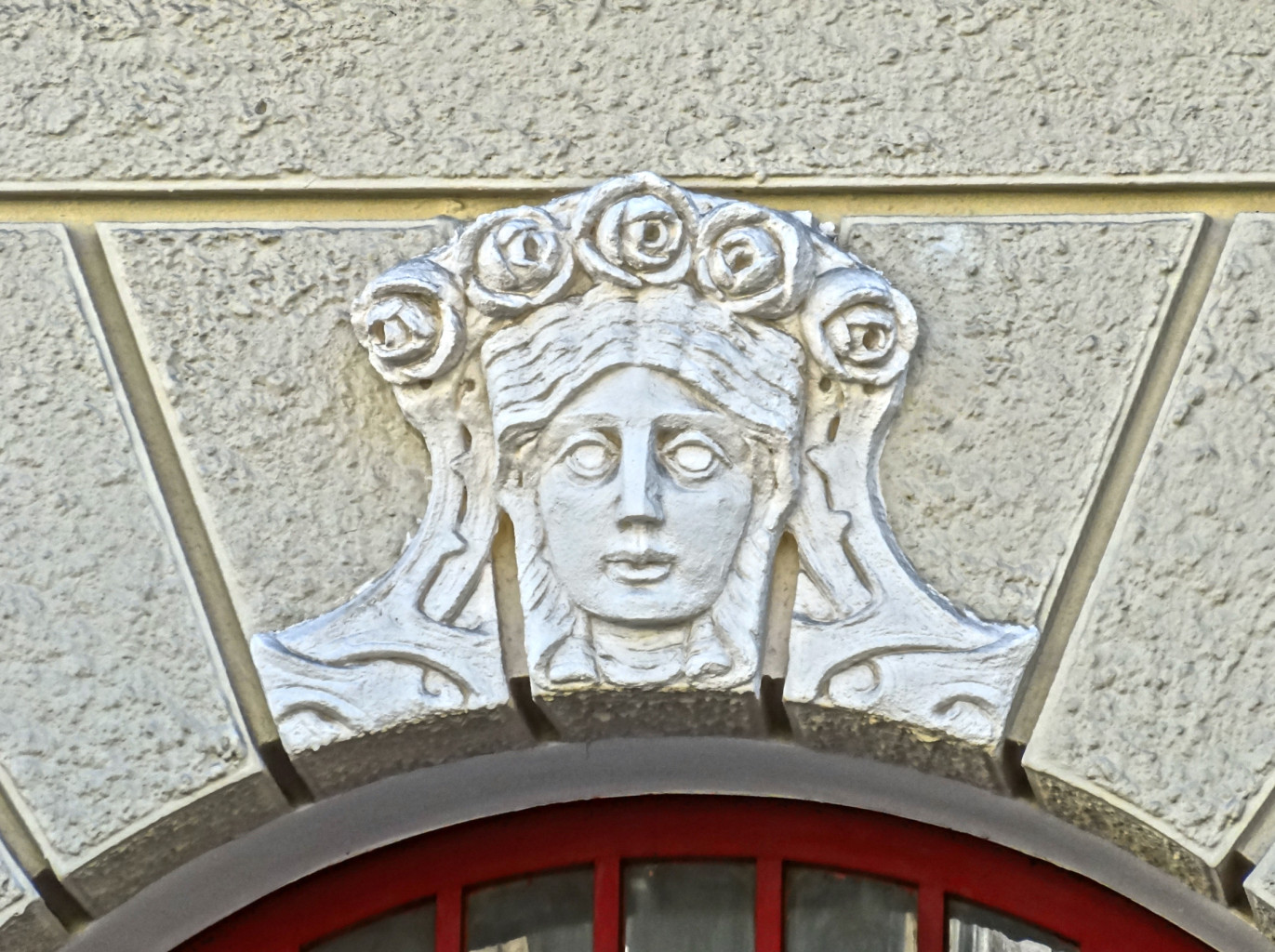
Portal detail at 13

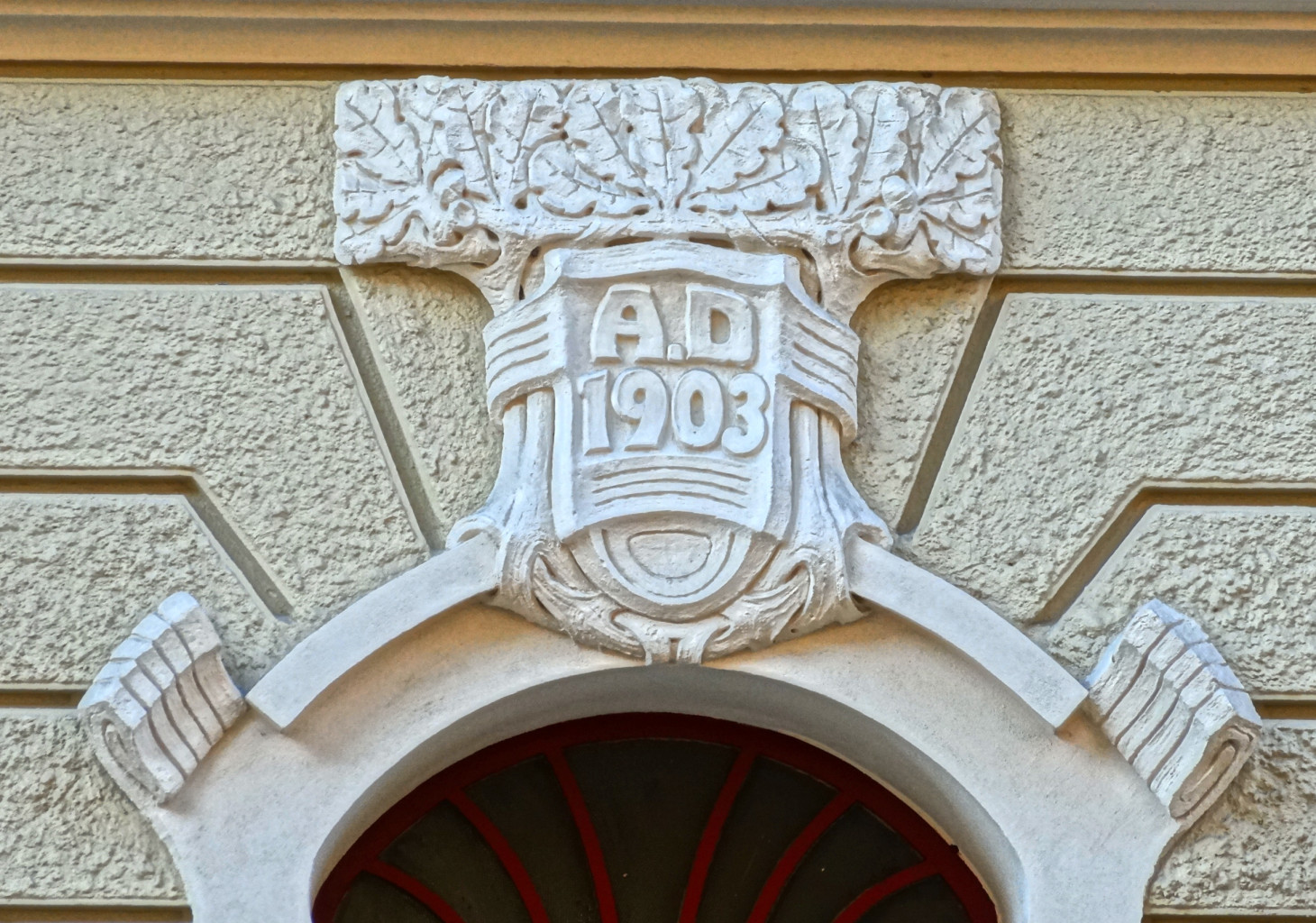
Portal detail at 15

=== Wilhelm Brzęczkowski's house at 14 ===
Registered on Kuyavian-Pomeranian Voivodeship Heritage List, Nr.601274-Reg.A/1052 (17 November 1997)

1899, by Karl Bergner

Eclecticism & elements of Neo-Mannerism

Karl Bergner (who also realized Nr.7,9,16,18 and 20 in the same street) realized this tenement on behalf of tailor Wilhelm Brzęczkowski, living at Dantzigerstrasse 42, today's Gdańsk Street 71.

The four-storey building with a loft has residential area wings. The front elevation is enriched with a bay window topped with a triangular gable. The Mansard roof shows dormers topped with tent roof.

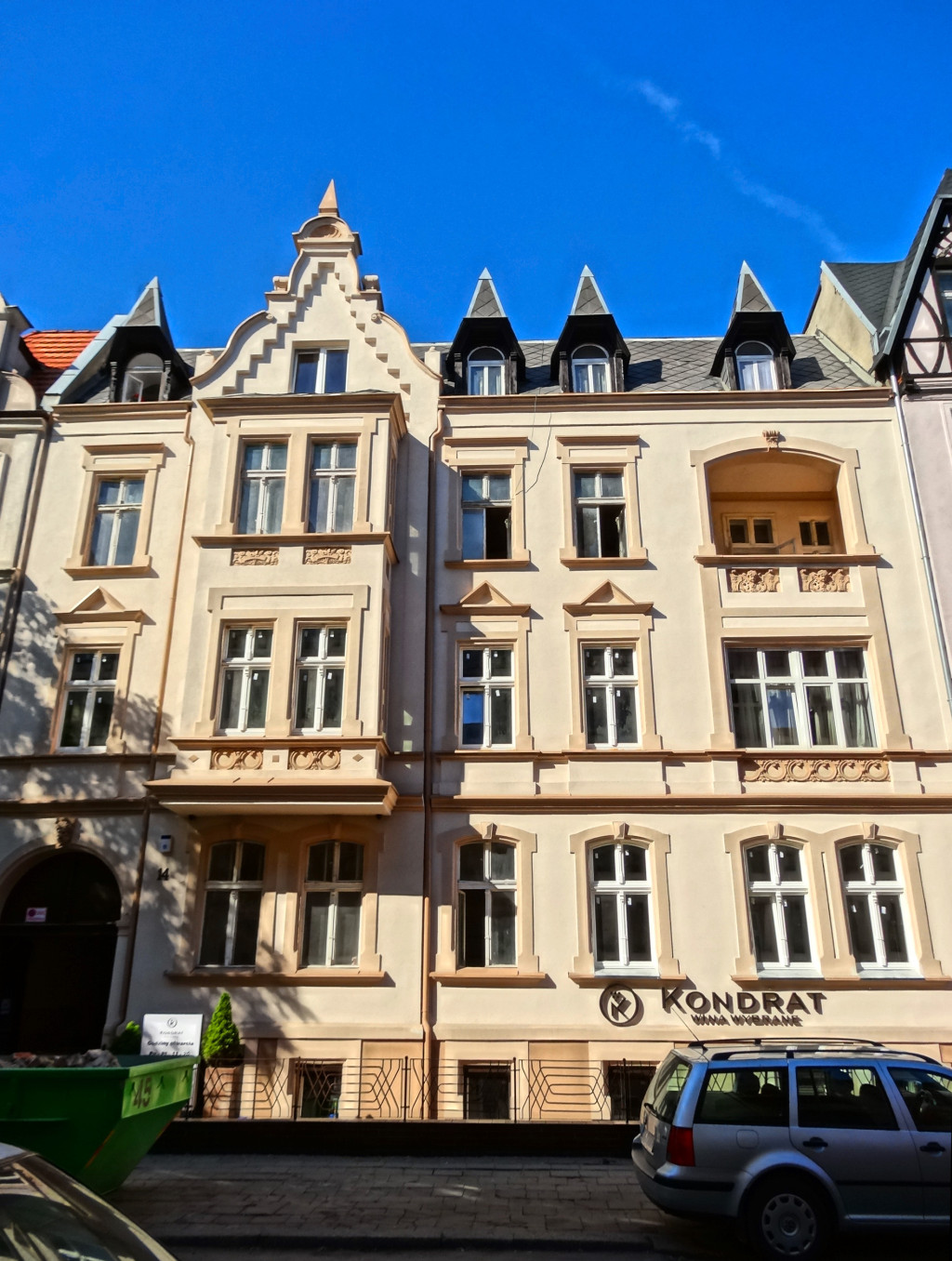
Main facade

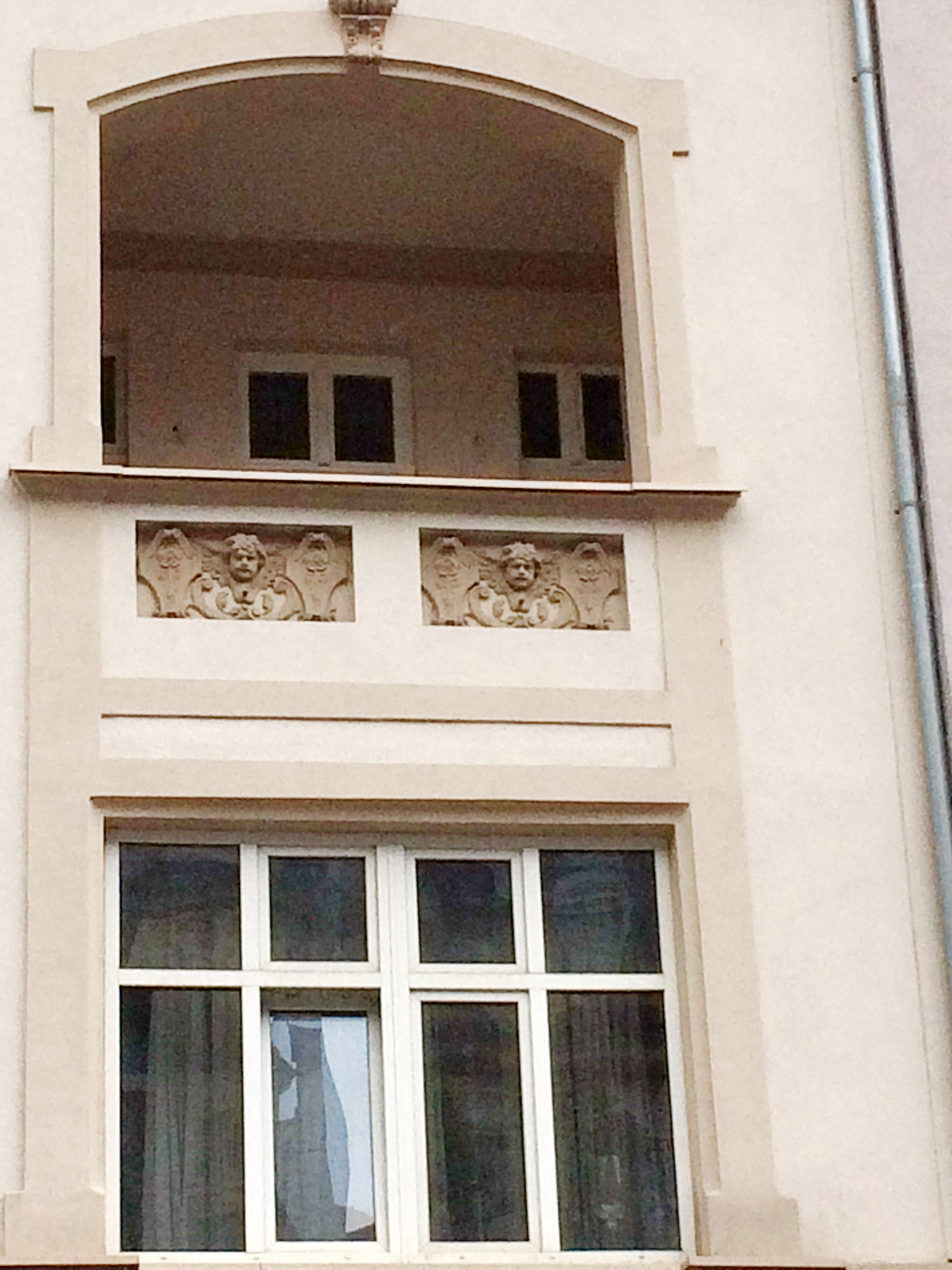
Detail of the facade

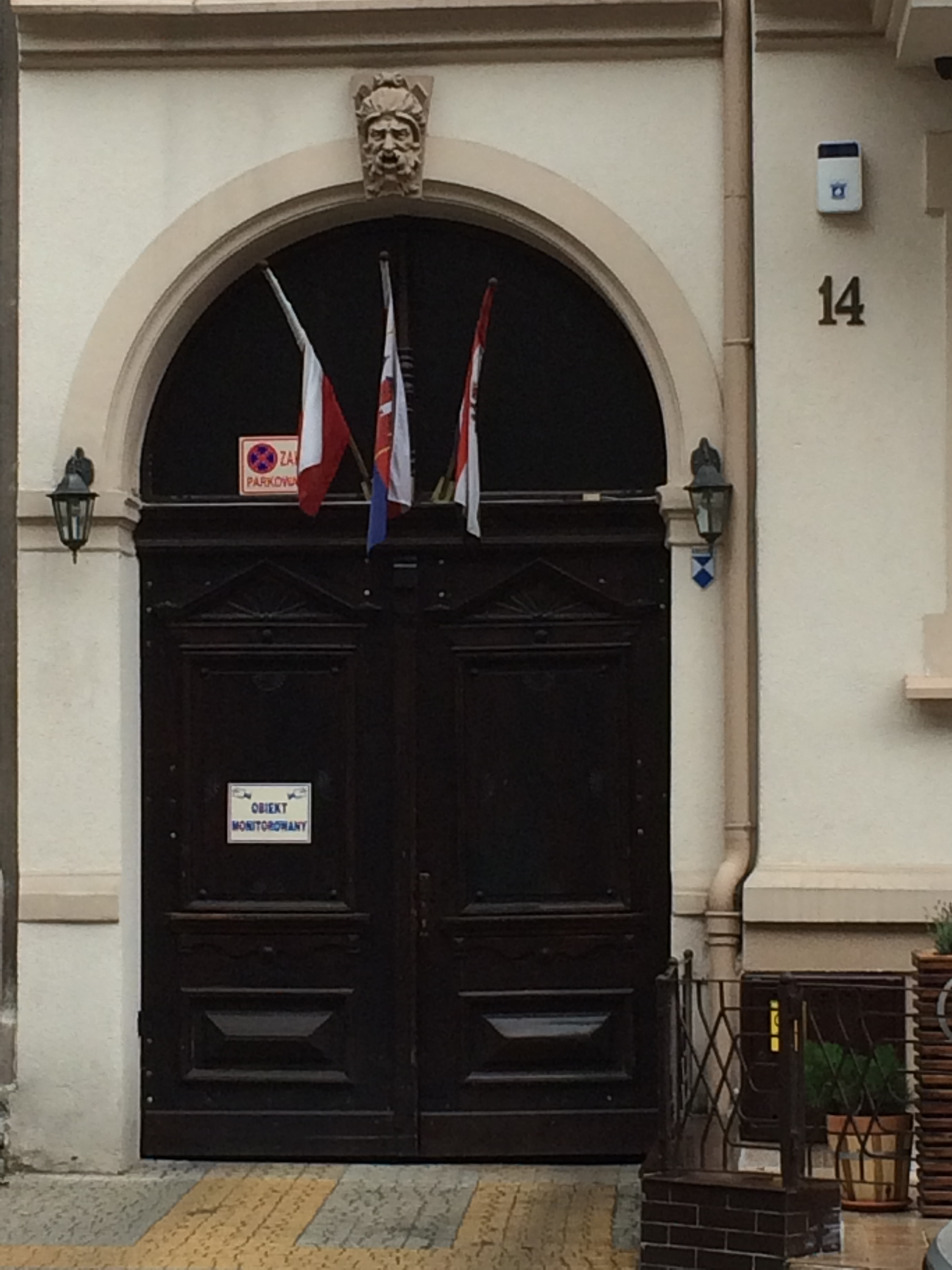
Main gate

=== Houses at 16/18/20 ===
Registered on Kuyavian-Pomeranian Voivodeship Heritage List, Nr.601275-Reg.A/1110, Nr.601277-Reg.A/1112 & Nr.601278-Reg.A/1113 (22 November 1993)

1901–1902, by Karl Bergner

Eclecticism, elements of Art Nouveau

The initiator of the project was Vincent Krause, the first owner, who sold the plot to the architect Karl Bergner. In 1901, Karl Bergner applied for a 3 houses building permission on the area. The work was finished in 1903, and shortly afterwards, individual pieces of the real estate were sold. A rehabilitation work including several architectural details has been performed around 2010.

The three-storey building has a "L" footprint with small outbuilding wings. The ensemble has got a common Mansard roof with attics and dormers. Façades are standardized, without any distinct divisions of individual segments. In the central part of the block are two bay window topped with spires. On the walls stand wide friezes with Art Nouveau plant motifs, while the bottom of both bay windows are adorned with chestnut leaves and a stylized head of a woman.

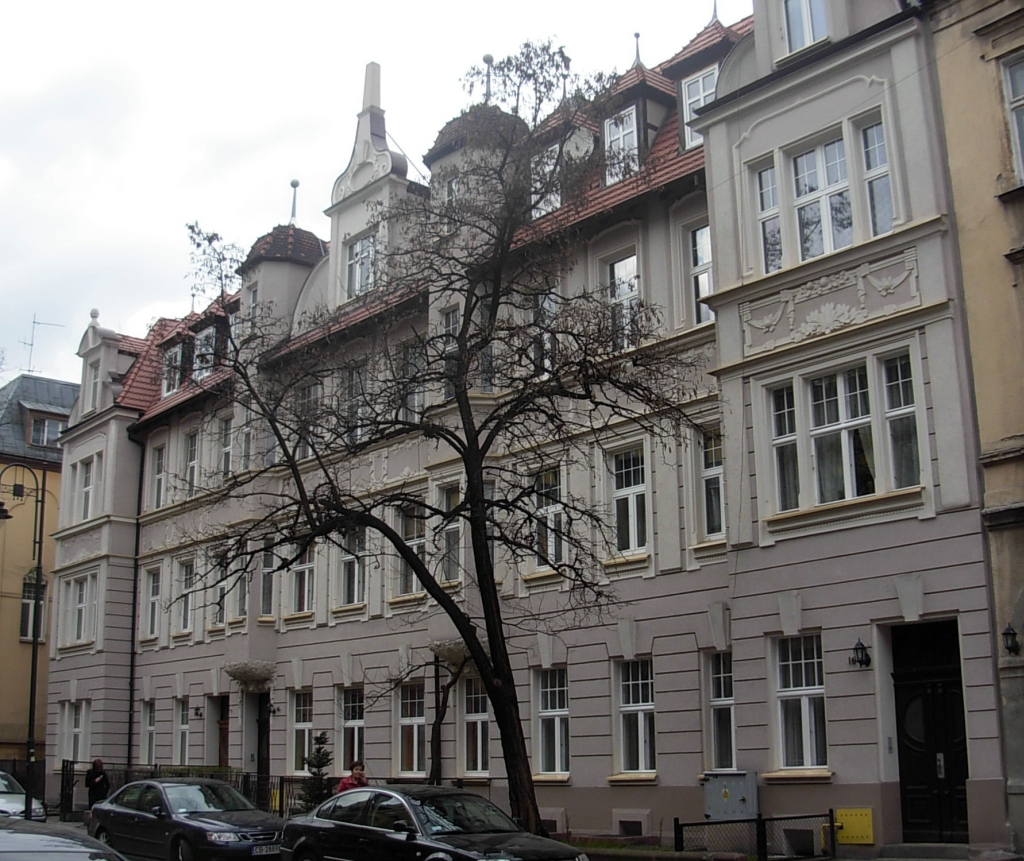
Main facade

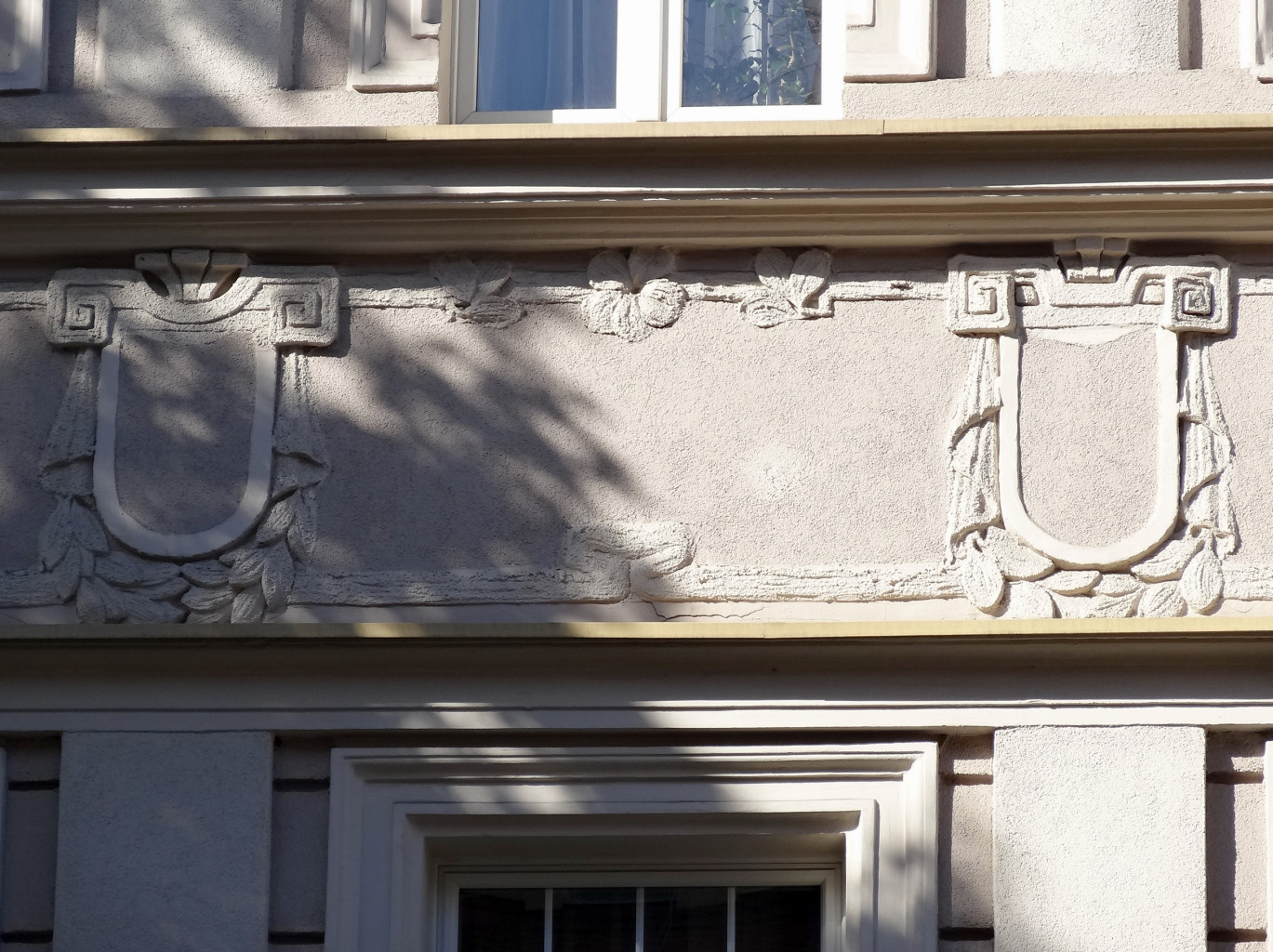
Facade frieze detail

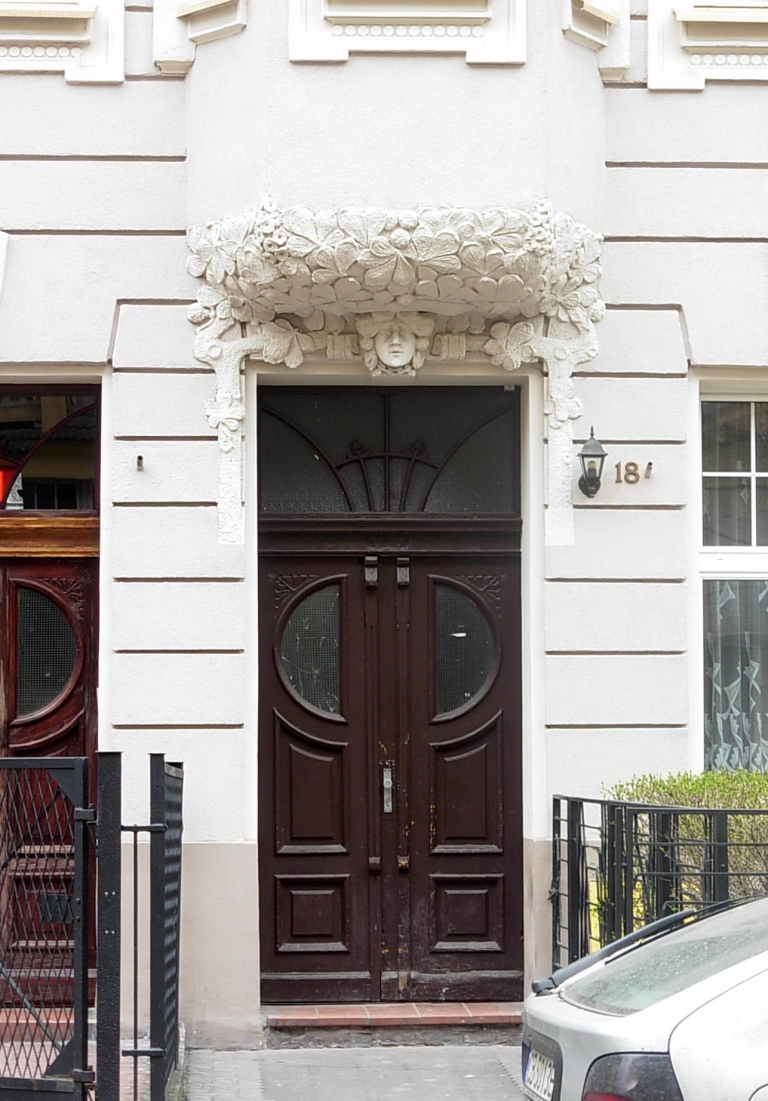
Gate decoration with leaves and the head of a woman
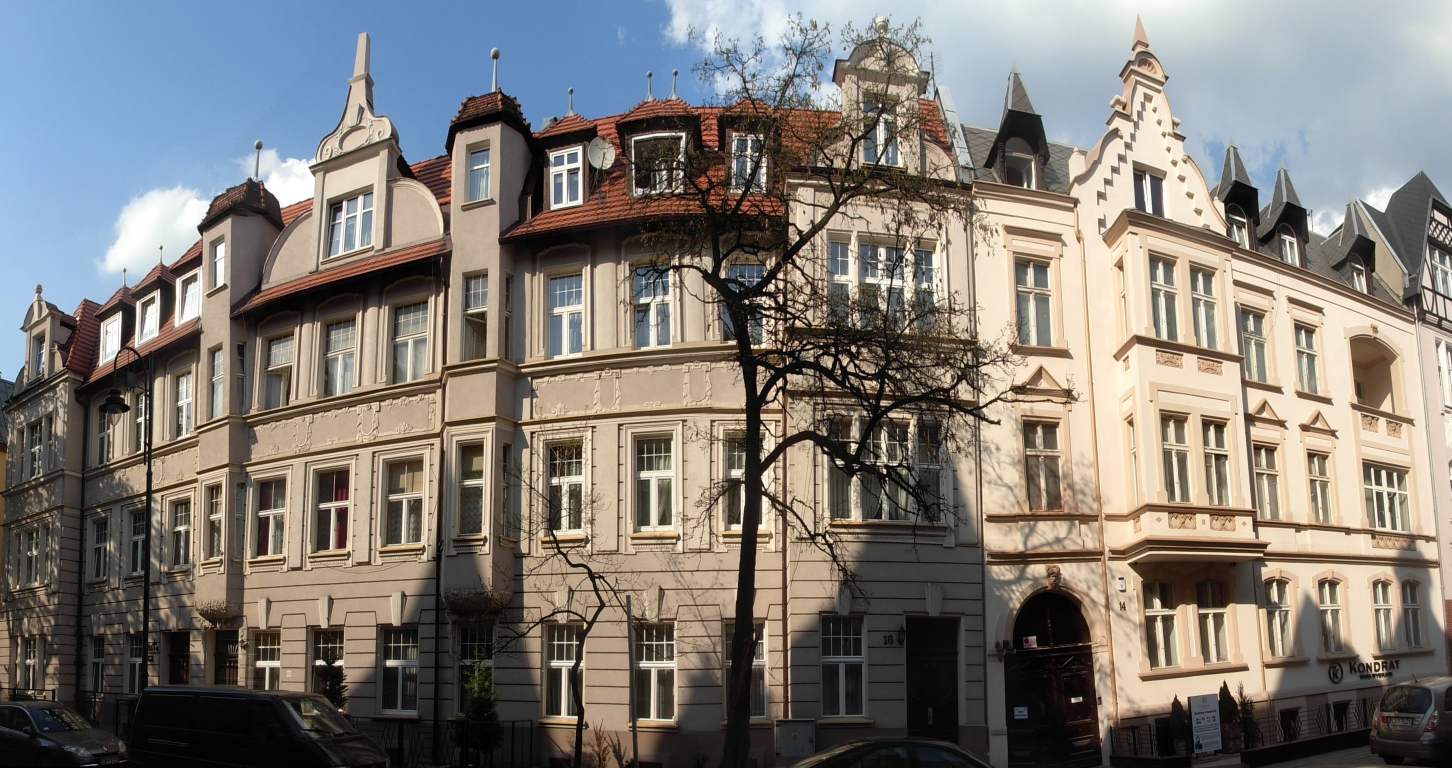
Panorama on Nr.14 (left) and Nr.16/18/20 (right) facades

=== Gustav Reschke's house at 17 ===
Registered on Kuyavian-Pomeranian Voivodeship Heritage List, Nr.601276-Reg.A/1111 (17 November 1993)

1897–1898, by Józef Święcicki

Eclecticism & elements of Neo-Baroque

The building was erected on behalf of the rentier Gustav Reschke. Current architectural details and original colors are the outcome overhaul connected performed in the 1990s. Polish Vice Admiral Napoleon Louis-Wawel lived there from 1923 till he committed suicide in this house in 1934.

In 1923, the Union of Poles from the Eastern Borderlands (Polish: Związek Polaków z Kresów Wschodnich) opened a charity kitchen to help the displaced Poles victims of the borders changes after the Peace of Riga with USSR: in 1929, it had served a total of 30014 meals. The kitchen was led by Anna von Helmersen, living at 12 Jan and Jędrzej Śniadecki Street.

The four-storey building with a residential attic has got a "L" shape. The front elevation is symmetrical, flanked on both sides by two massive balconies topped by Mansard roof. Dormers standing on the gable are ornamented with volutes.

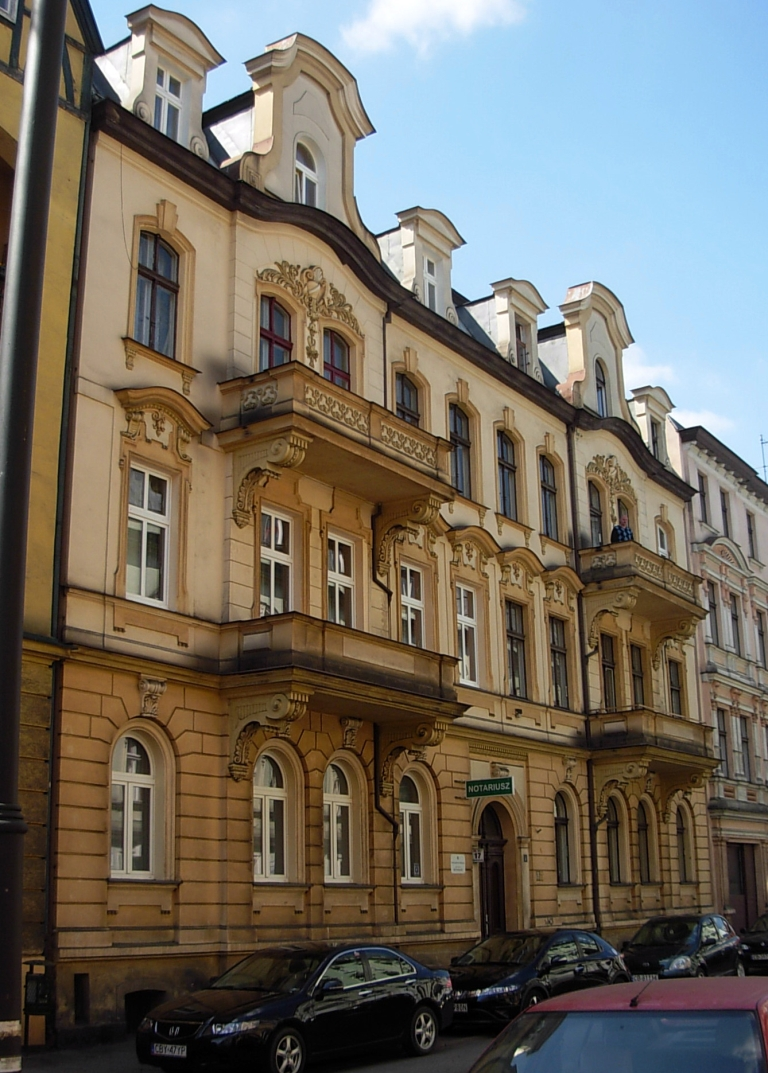
Main facade

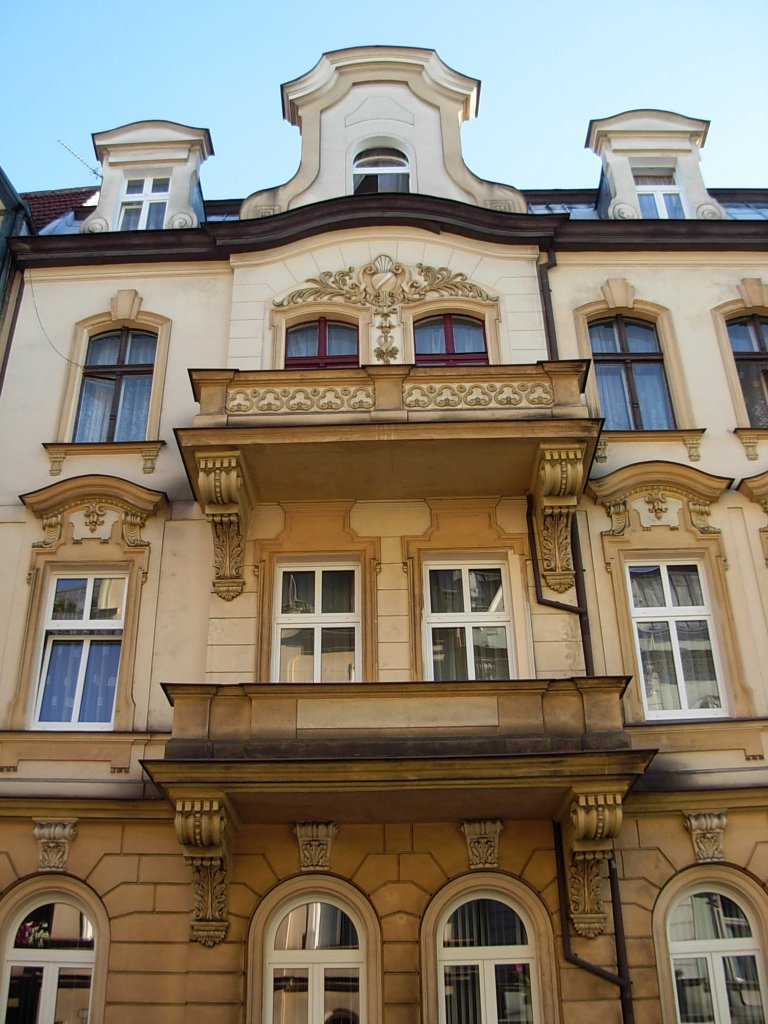
balconies

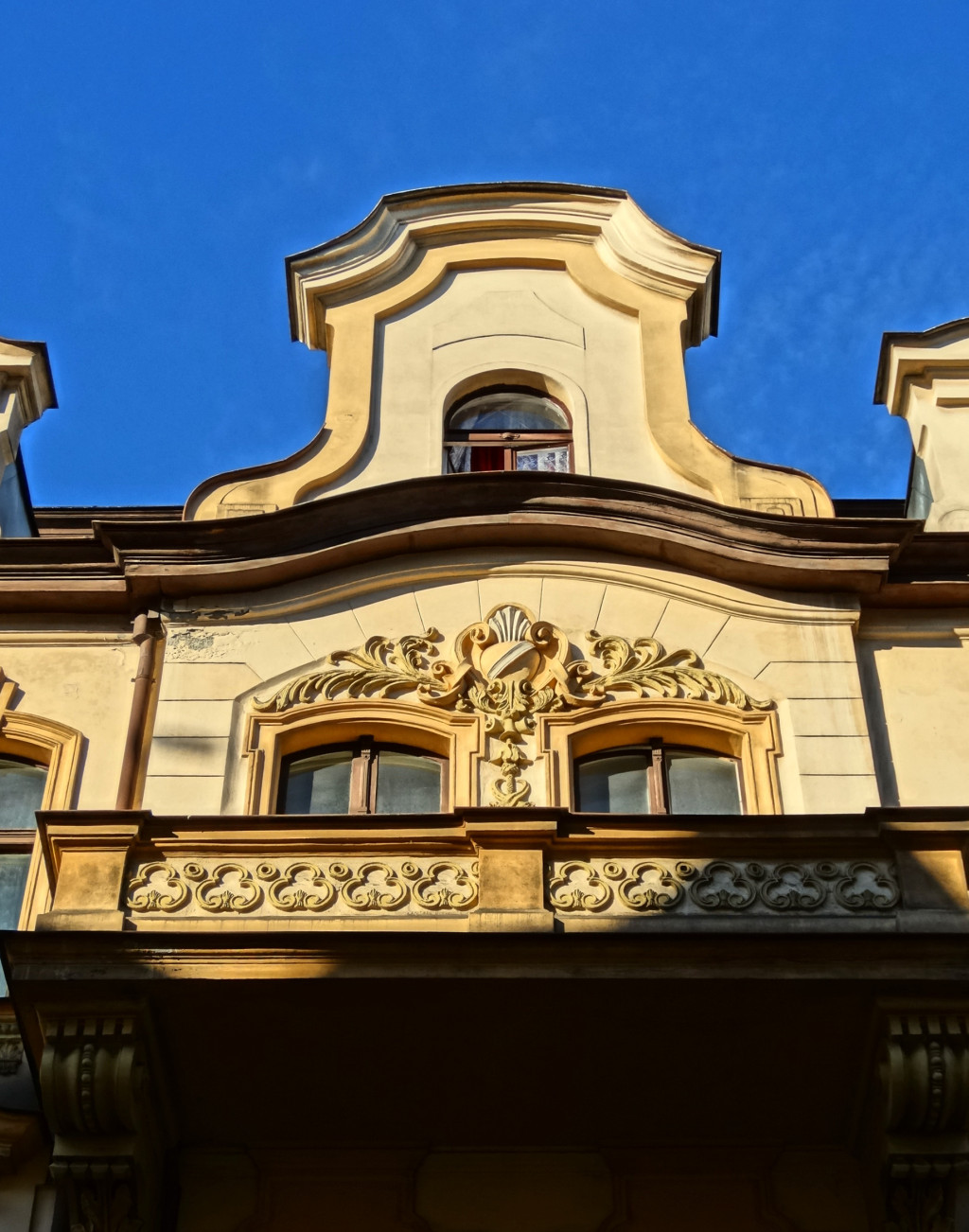
Gable detail

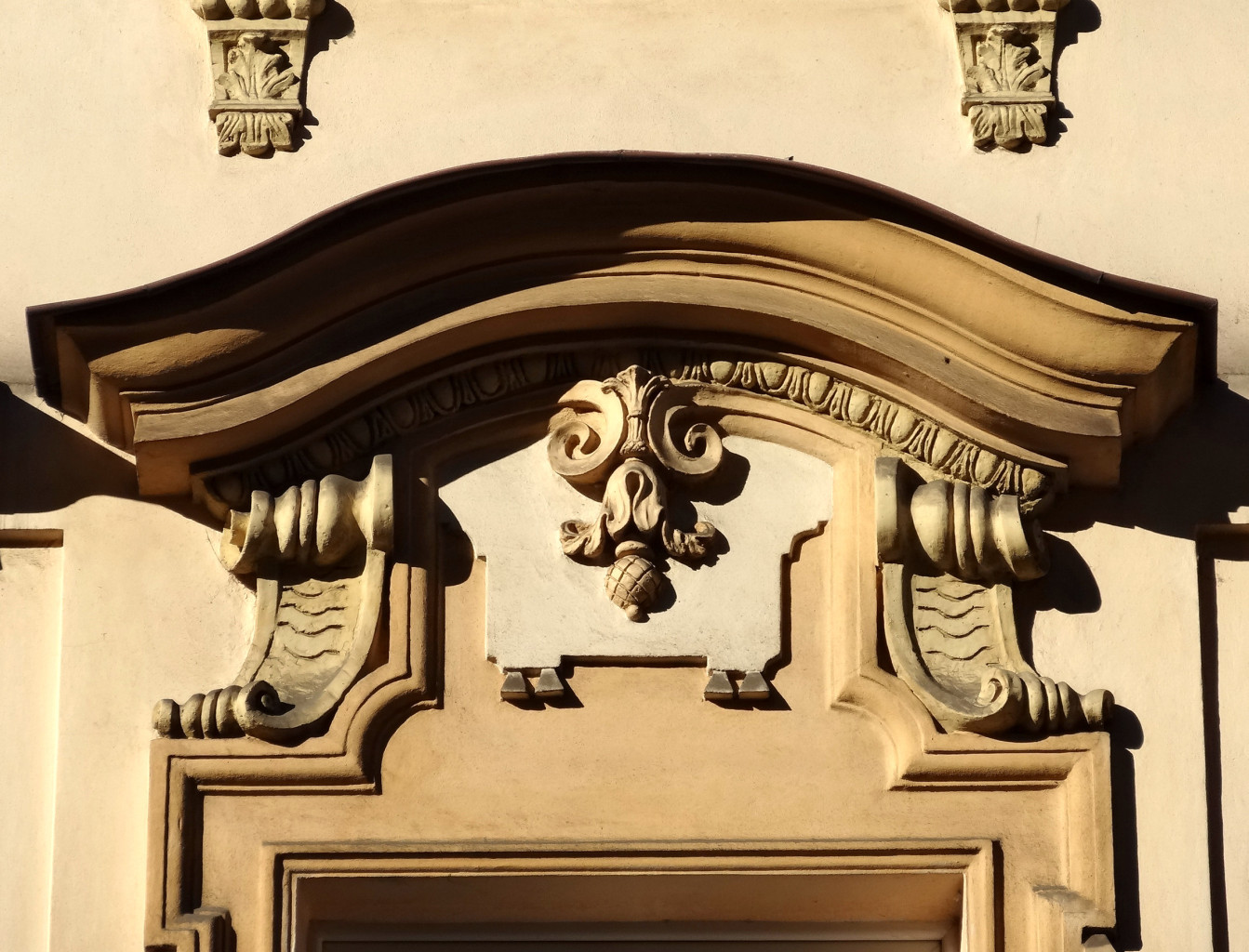
pediment detail

=== Vincent Krause's house at 22 ===
Registered on Kuyavian-Pomeranian Voivodeship Heritage List, Nr.601279-Reg.A/1087 (23 November 1993)

1898–1899, by Fritz Weidner

Eclecticism & Art Nouveau

The building was commissioned by a wealthy craftsman Vincent Krause. From 1902 to 1907, the new owner, a railway clerk named Richard Fiedler, ordered a reconstruction of the building, including:

- the expansion of a wing to fit an additional staircase,
- the building of glazed verandas and a balcony in a corner,
- an additional ground-floor outbuilding.

Thorough restorations have been performed in the 1990s and after 2000.

The building has four storeys, part of which recedes into the lot. The block is enriched with a series of glass verandas and gables. On the corner, under a pink tracery canopy, is placed a halberdier, symbolic protector and guardian of the house. In the opposite corner, a cartouche bears the initials "KV" from the first owner of the building, Krause Vincent. The facades display various cornices and ornaments, embellished with vegetal motifs. The top of the main facade is capped with a weather vane bearing the date "1899".

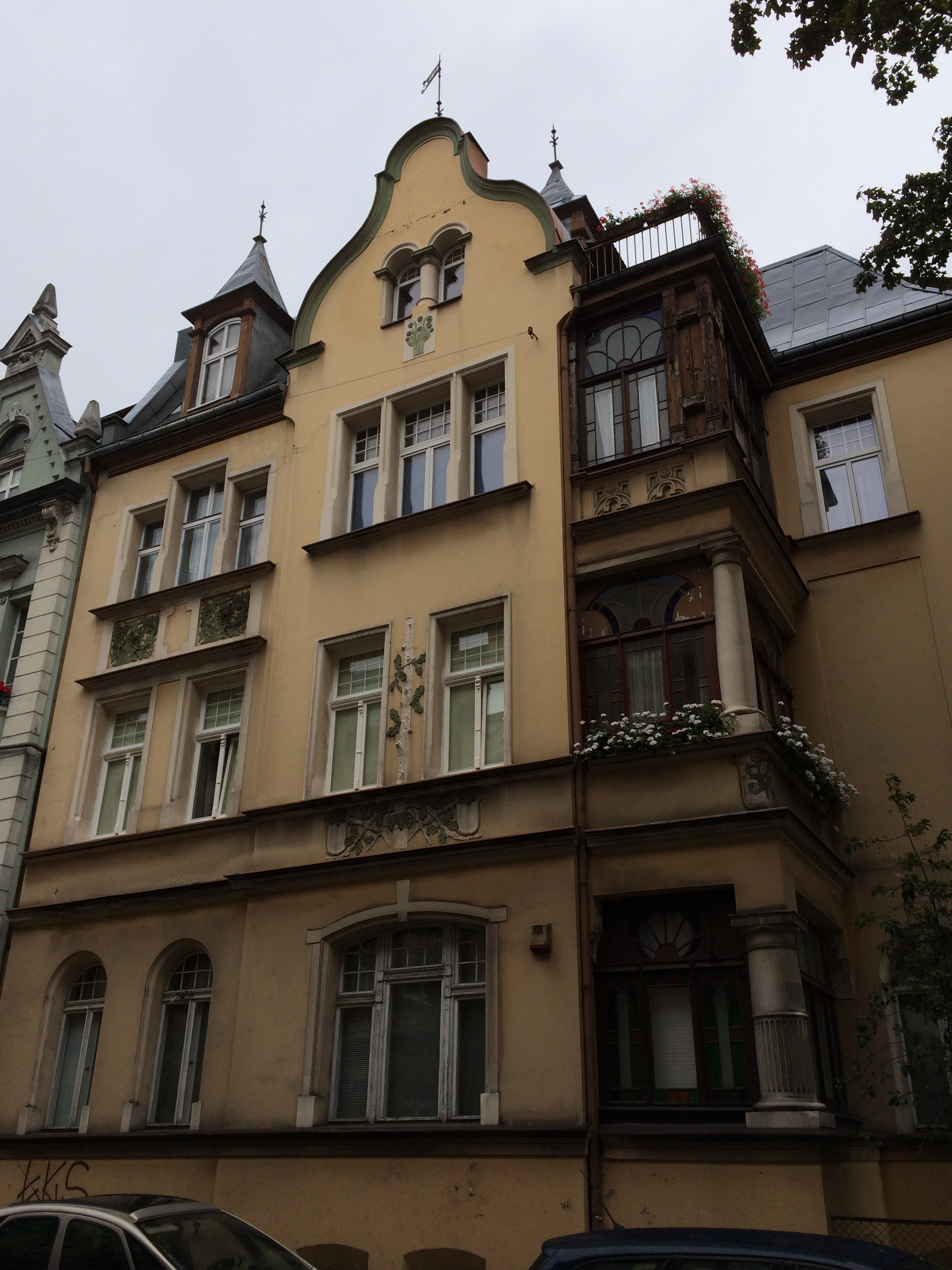
View from Cieszkowski Street

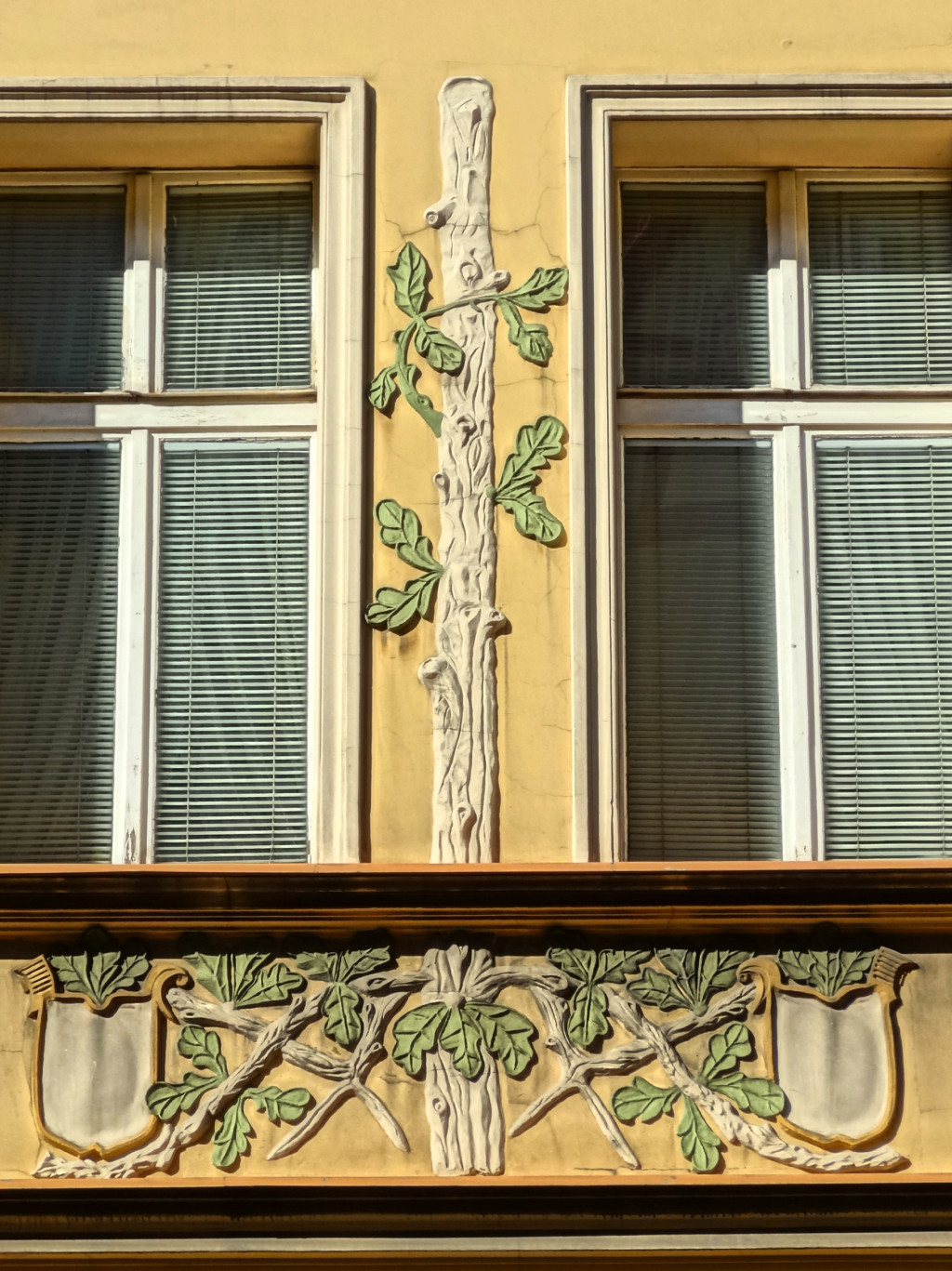
Floral ornaments

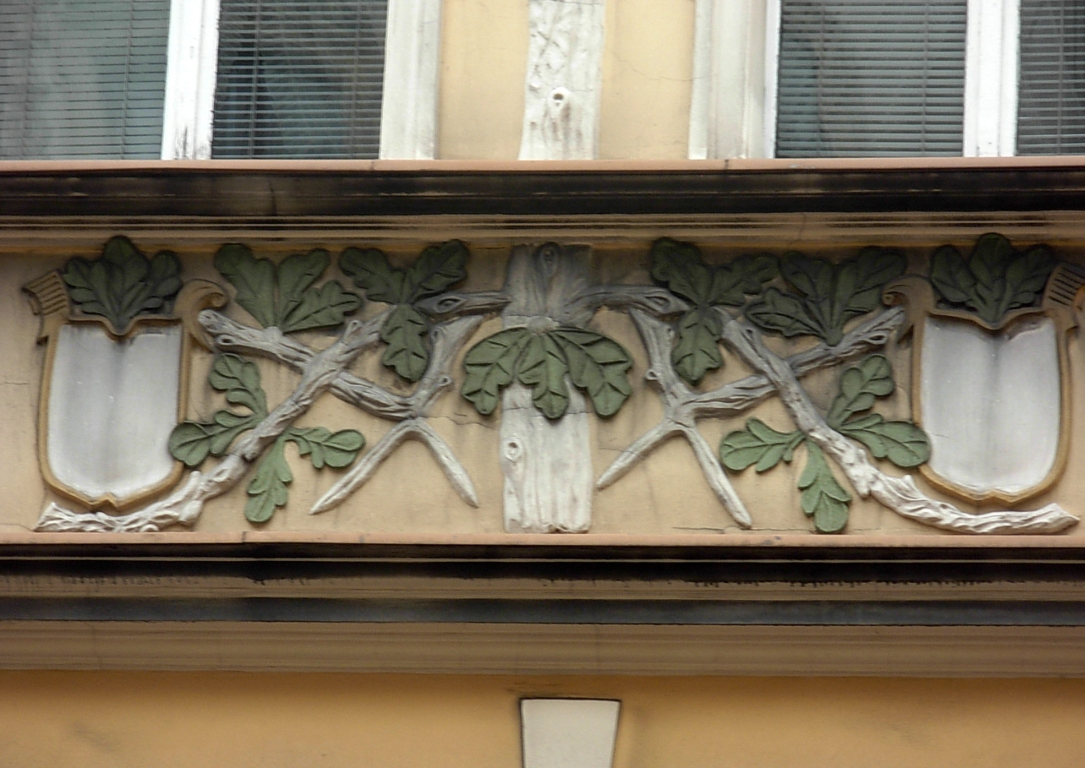
Floral ornaments

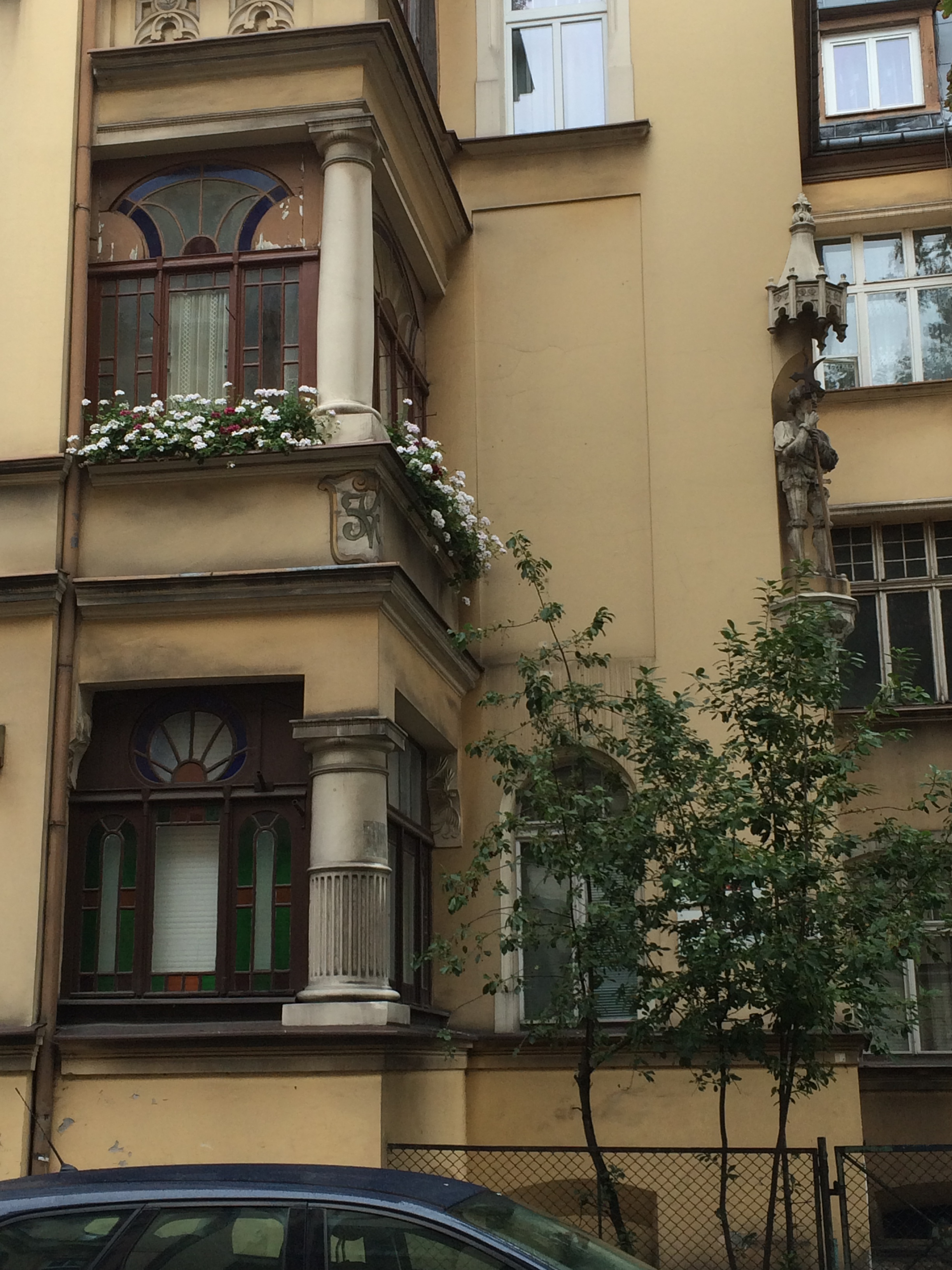
Detail of the frontage

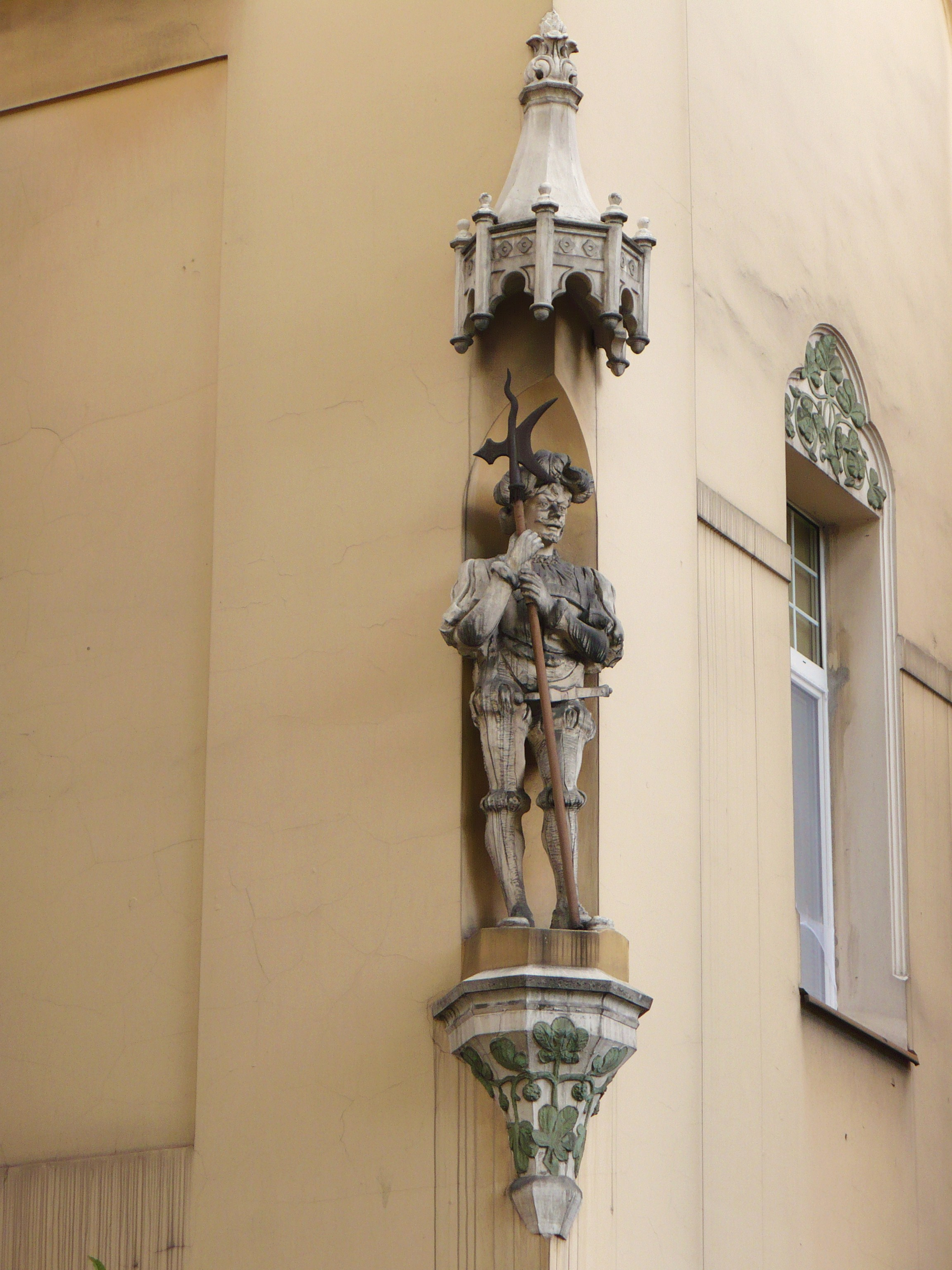
Halberdier figure

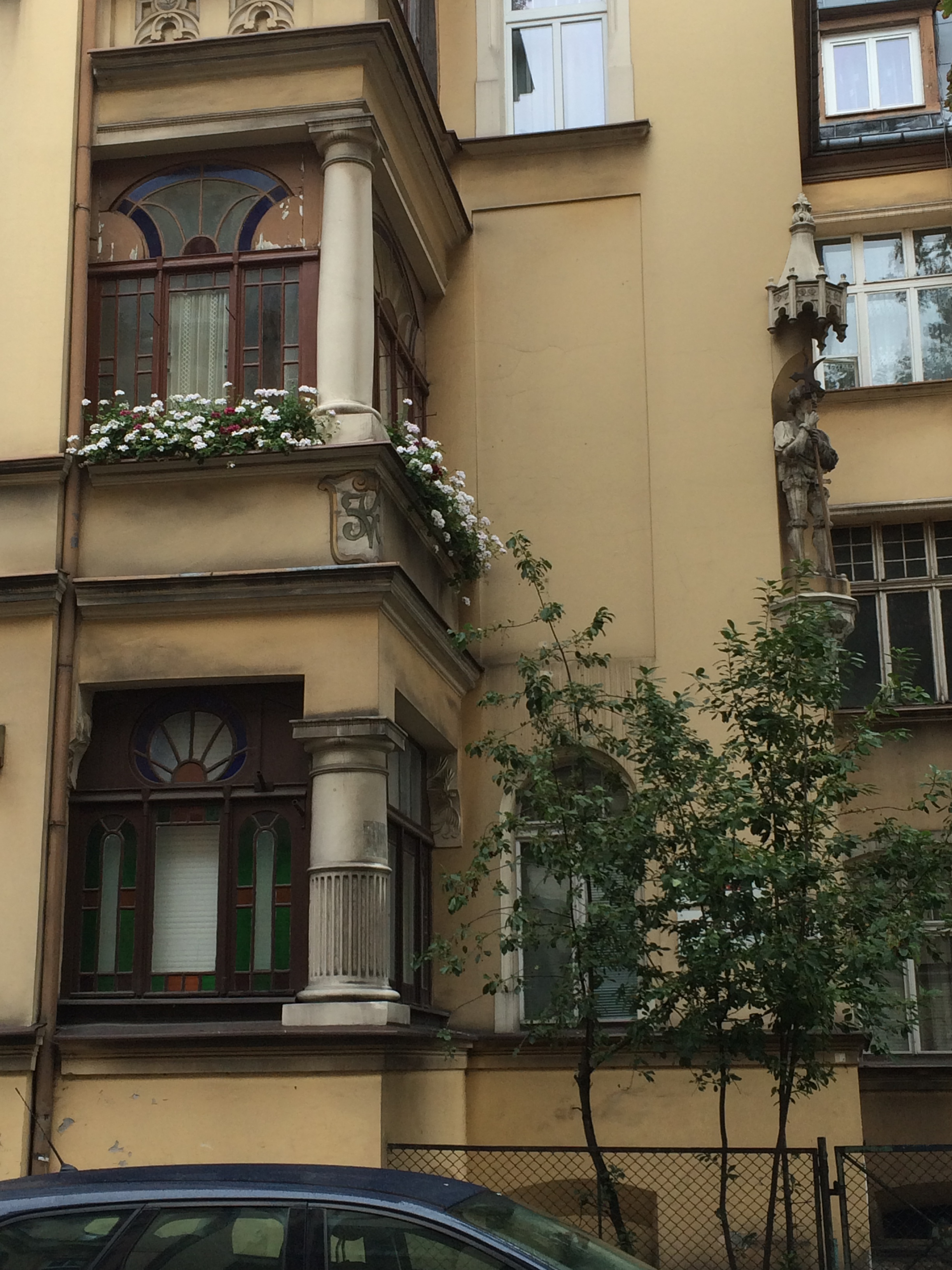
View of corner building with KV initials between the two floors

=== Corner house with 48 Pomorska Street ===
Registered on Kuyavian-Pomeranian Voivodeship Heritage List, Nr.601398-Reg.A/1099 (4 May 1994)

1896, by Józef Święcicki

Eclecticism, forms of Neo-Renaissance & Neo-Baroque.

The first building on the plot dates back to the 1870s. In 1896, at the same location, Gustav Reschke, a rentier and real estate dealer (who already ordered buildings at Nr.11 and 17) commissioned a new, grander tenement. The ground floor was devoted to retail stores and the rest was a four-storey apartment. A full revitalization of the house, bringing back original facade appearance with reconstructed architectural details and original colors, has been carried out in 1993–1994.

The four-storey building has a "L" shape with bay windows and balconies on the first and second floor. The front elevation is symmetrical, with regularly laid out architectural decoration. Some of the first floor windows are flanked by Ionic pilasters. Second floor windows are topped with stylized acanthus pediments.

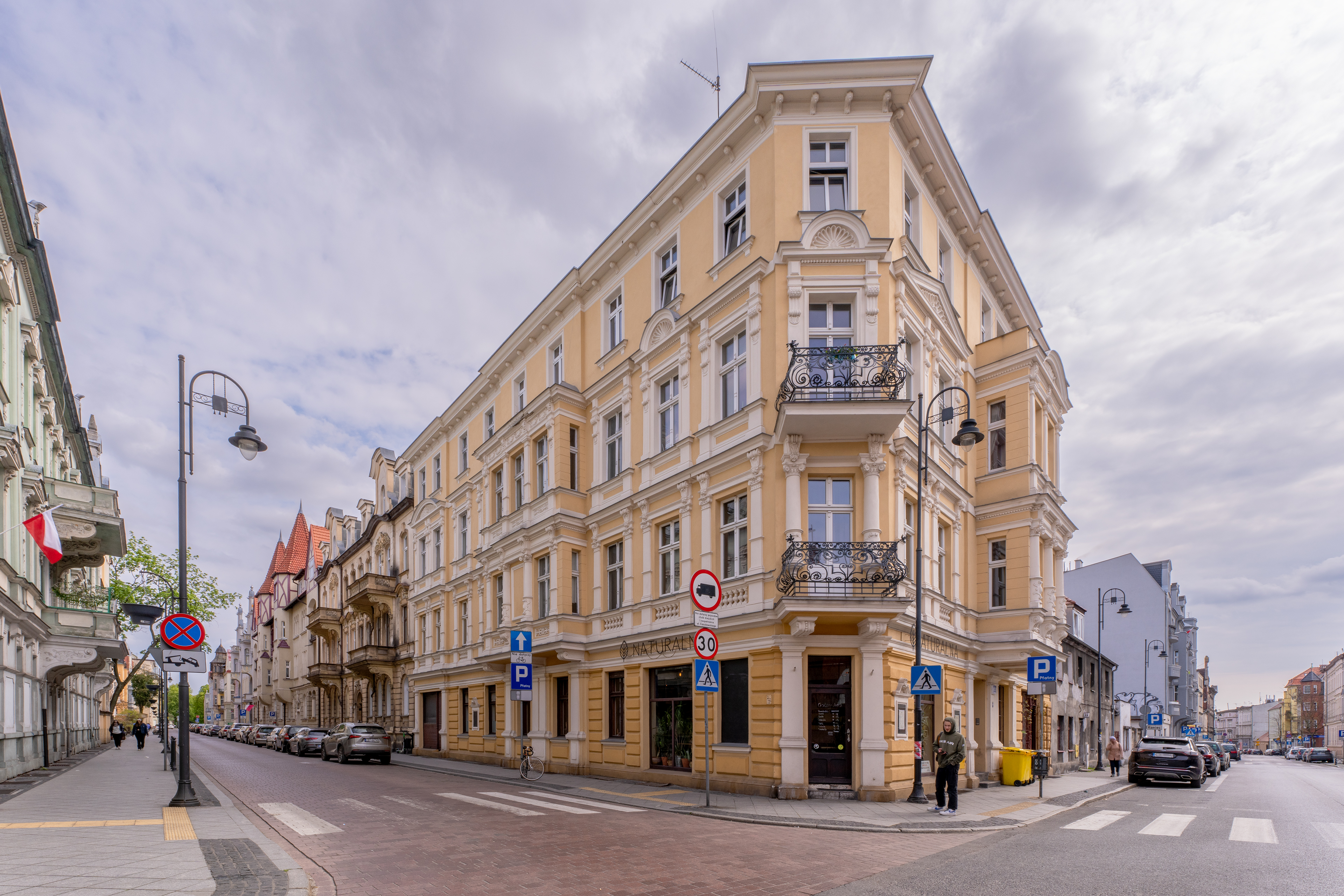
View from street crossing

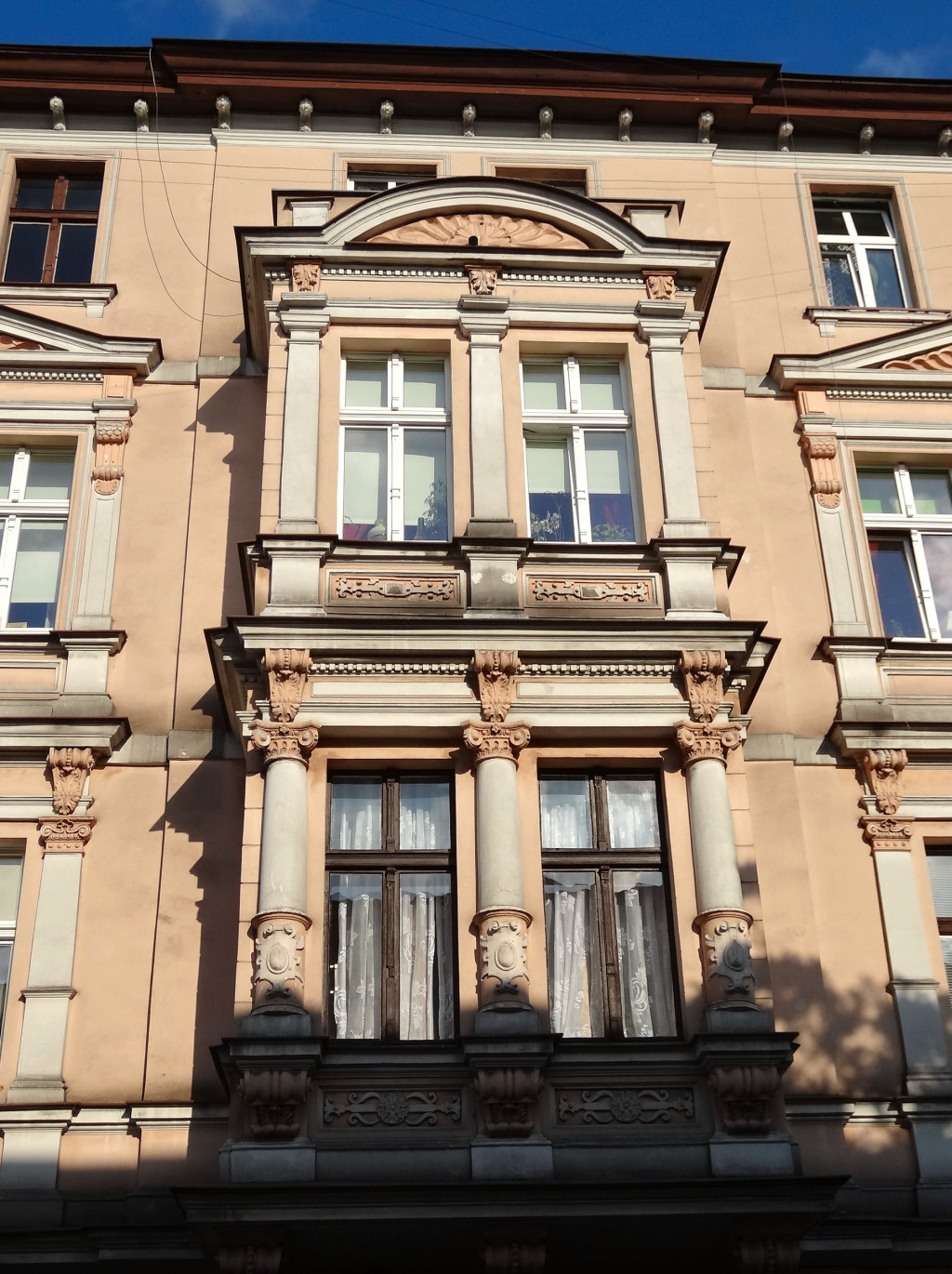
Bay window detail

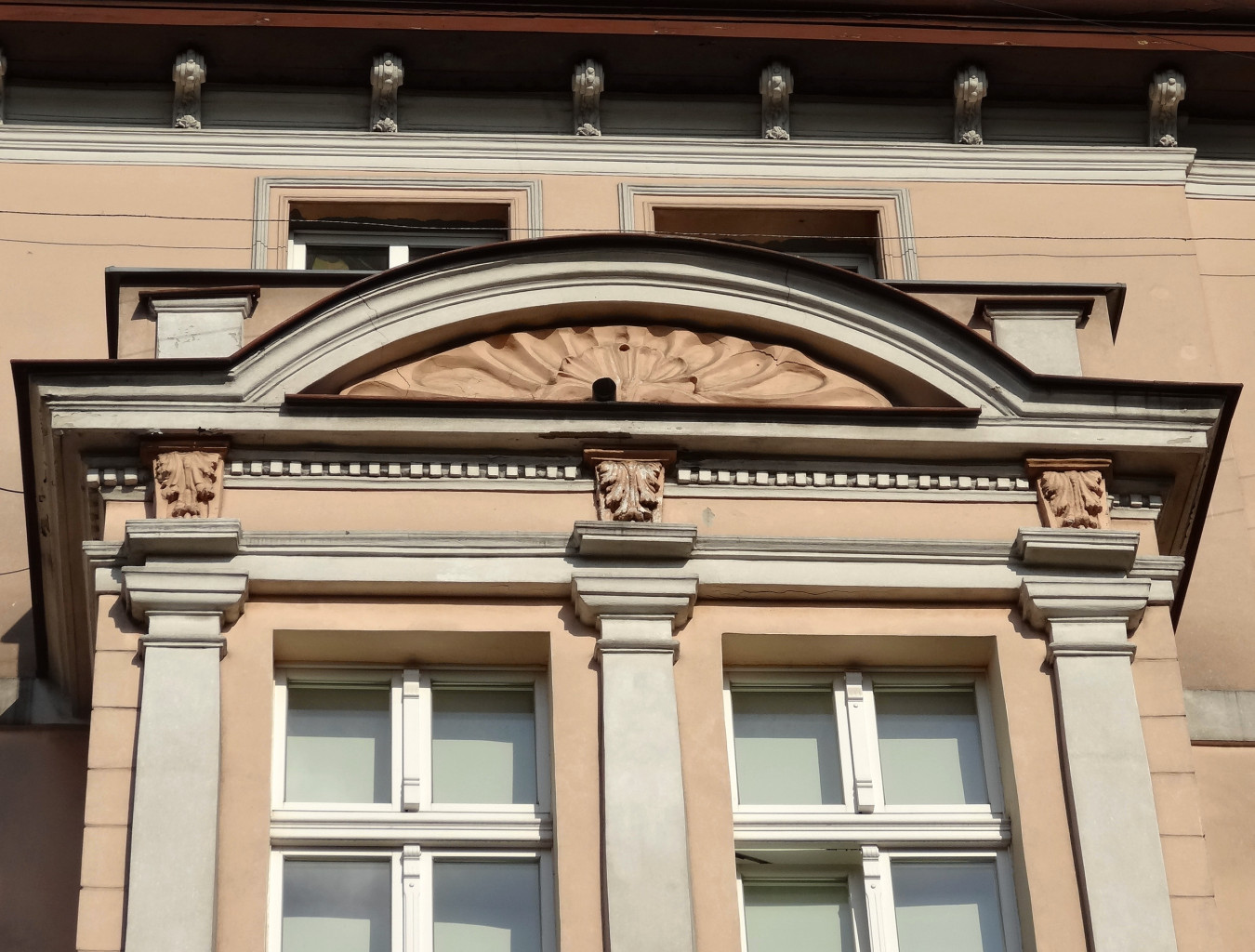
Stylized acanthus pediment

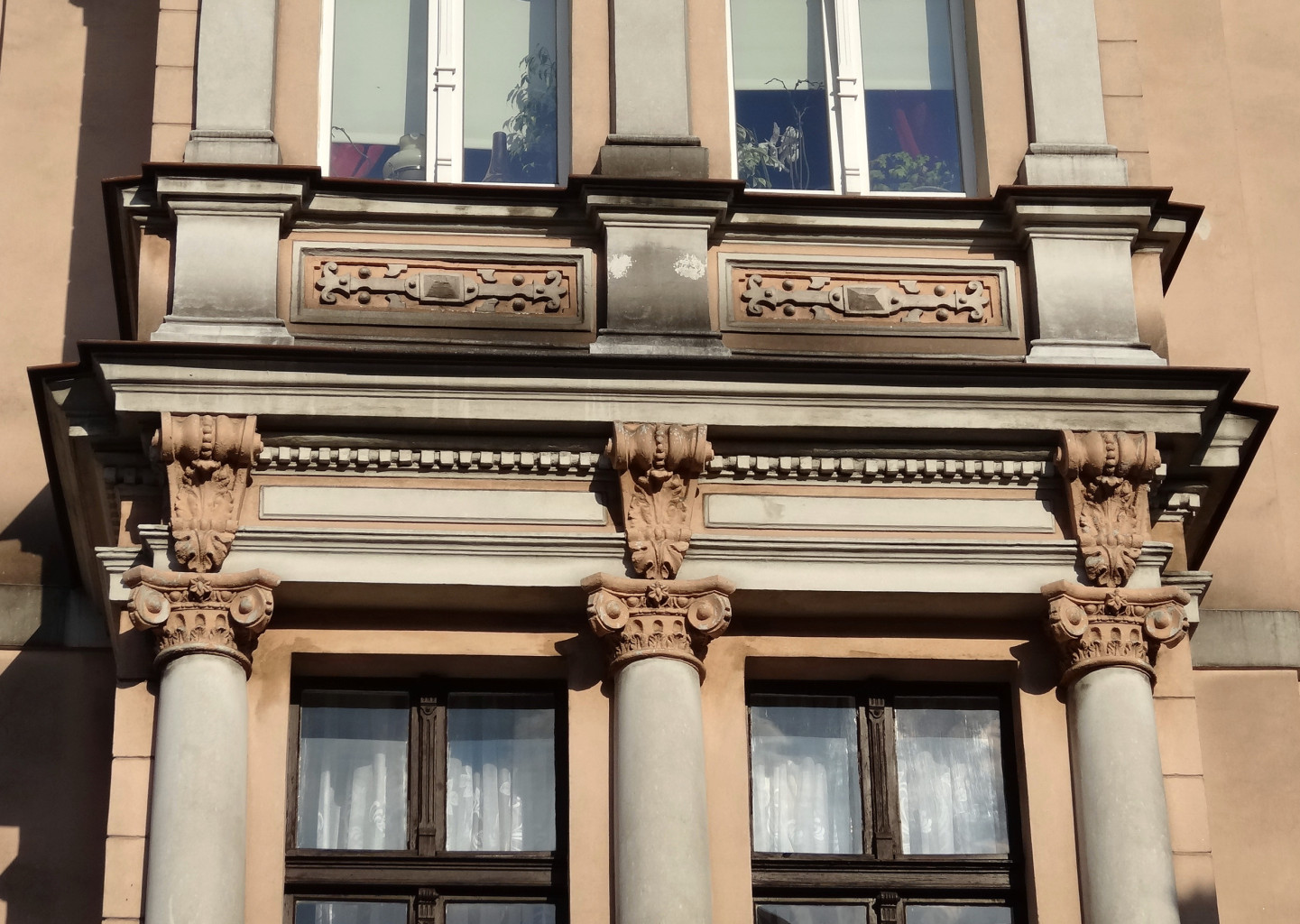
Ionic pilasters

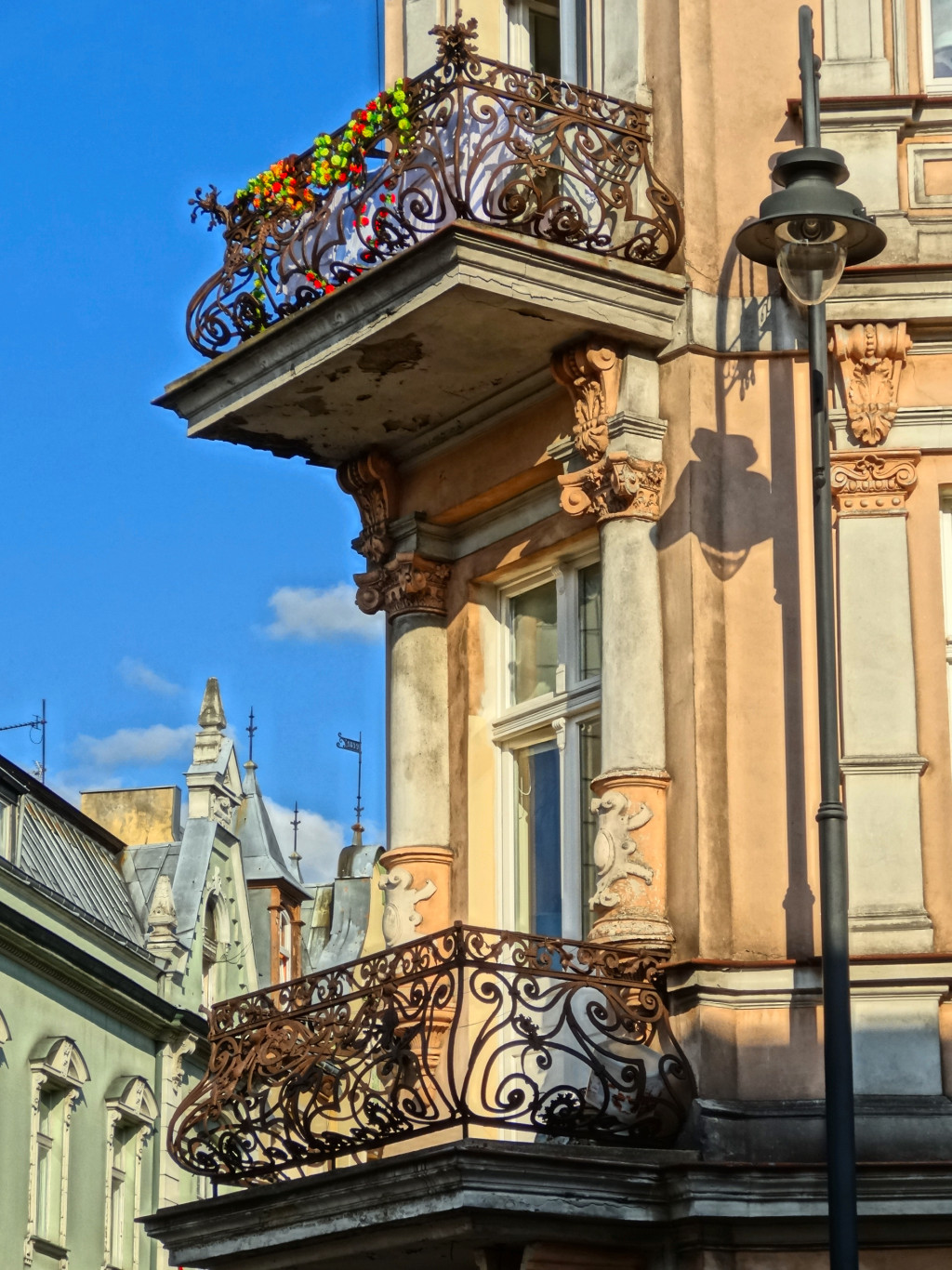
Balconies

=== House at 24, corner with 50 Pomorska Street ===
Registered on Kuyavian-Pomeranian Voivodeship Heritage List, Nr.601399-Reg.A/1051 (8 December 1997)

1899, by Karl Bergner

Eclectic, forms of picturesque architecture and Neo-Baroque

The first building on the plot dates back to the 1870s. In 1895, in the same location, the architect Fritz Weidner designed another tenement on behalf of Wilhelmin Wiemer, owner of the lot. Finally, for financial disputes, the project has been carried out by Karl Bergner instead of Weidner. The construction of the building was completed in 1899. The ground floor was devoted to shopping and restoration retail and upper floors for housing. On 11 October 1936 Richard Klewin, a dentist, acquired the building. During the communist era the building housed the restaurant Gromada and since 2000, it accommodates restaurant "Pierogarnia pod Aniołami" ("Dumpling Restaurant Under the Angels"), run by Bydgoszcz Diocese Caritas association. The facade has undergone a full overhaul in 1994.

The three-storey building has a "U" shape footprint with a beveled corner. The corner elevation displays an avant-corps as well as the facade on Cieszkowski street, which is also enriched with a two-storey bay window. The corner, capped by a spired roof lantern, is flanked on the top with triangular gables with dormer windows. The second floor bay-window is an open arcaded loggia supported by Ionic columns.

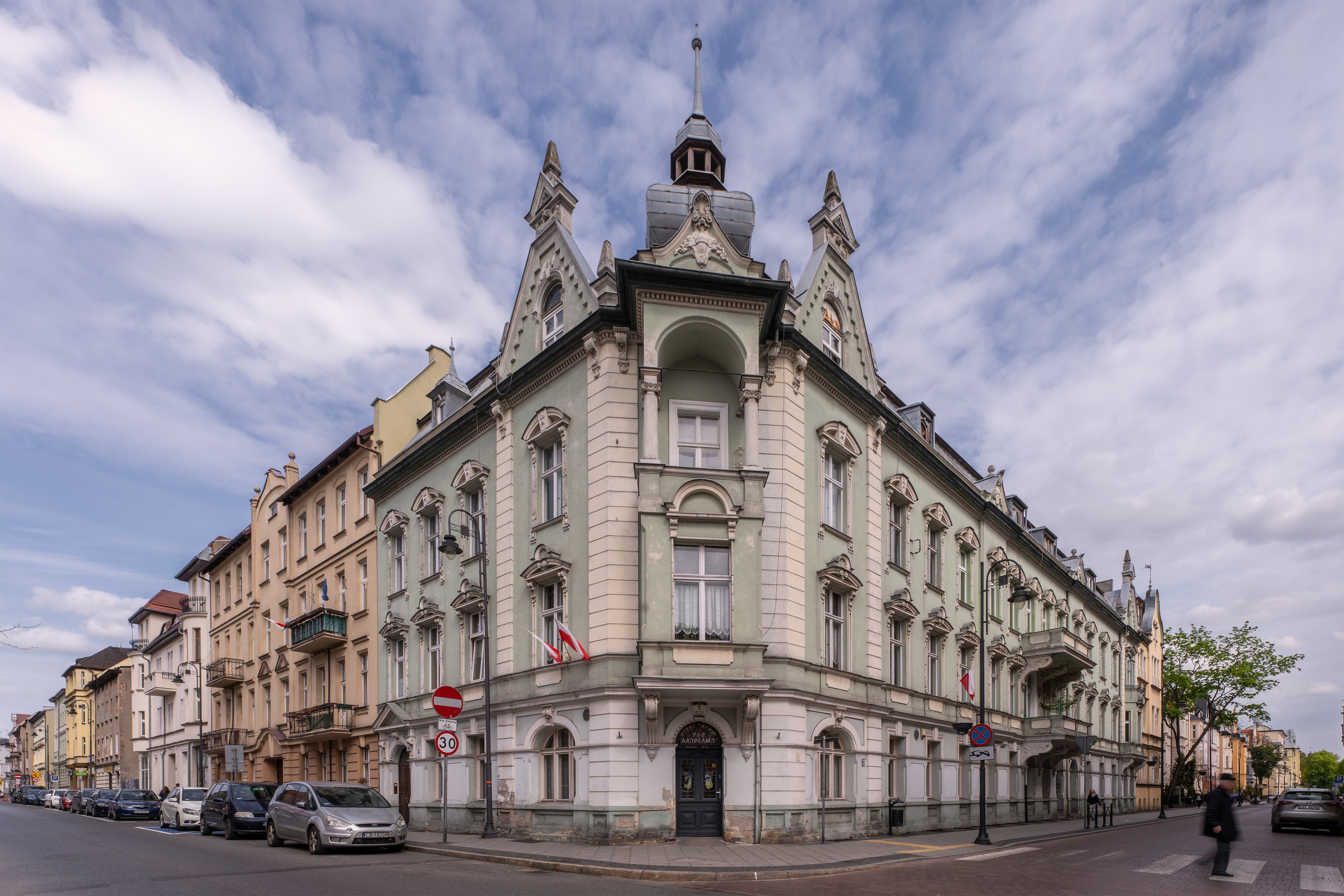
View from streets intersection

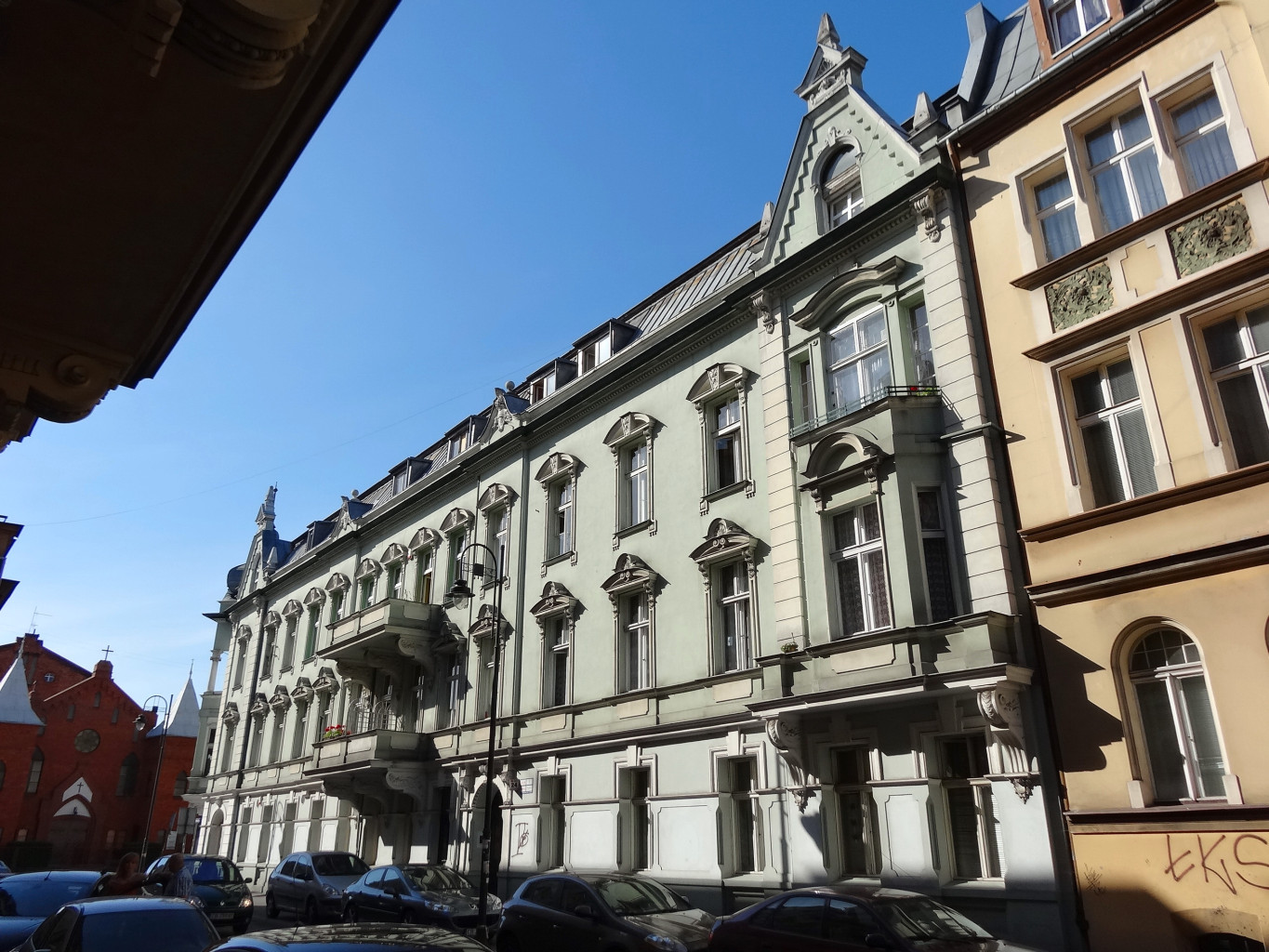
View from Cieszkowski Street

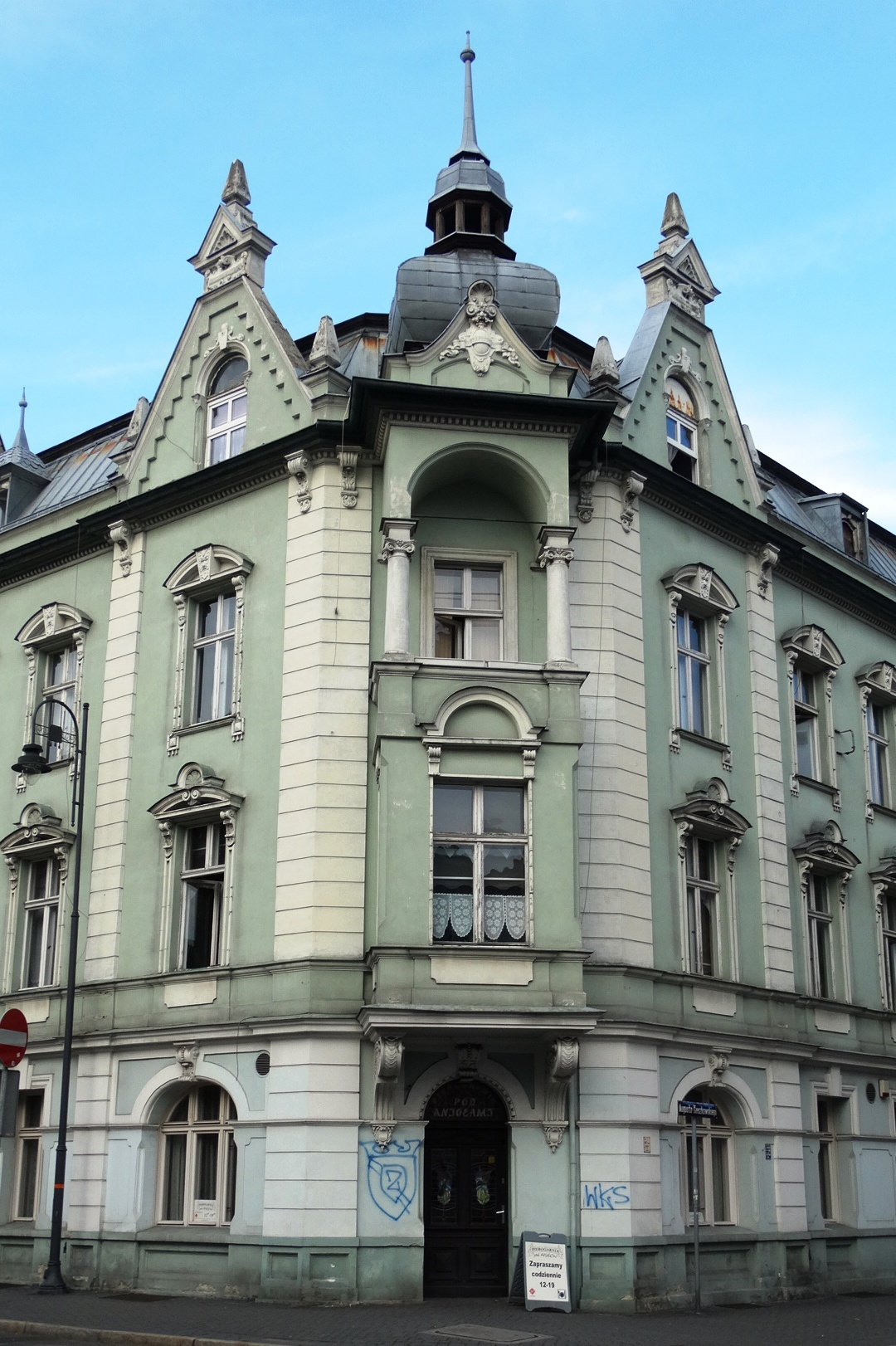
Corner avant-corps

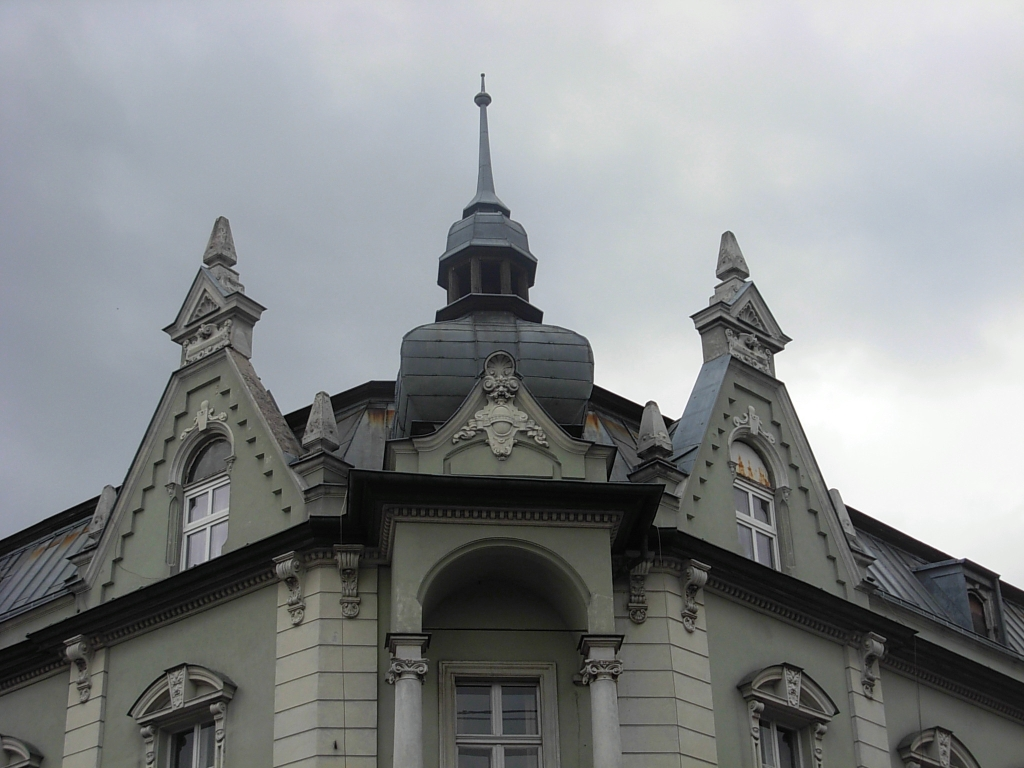
Spire on the roof and triangular gables

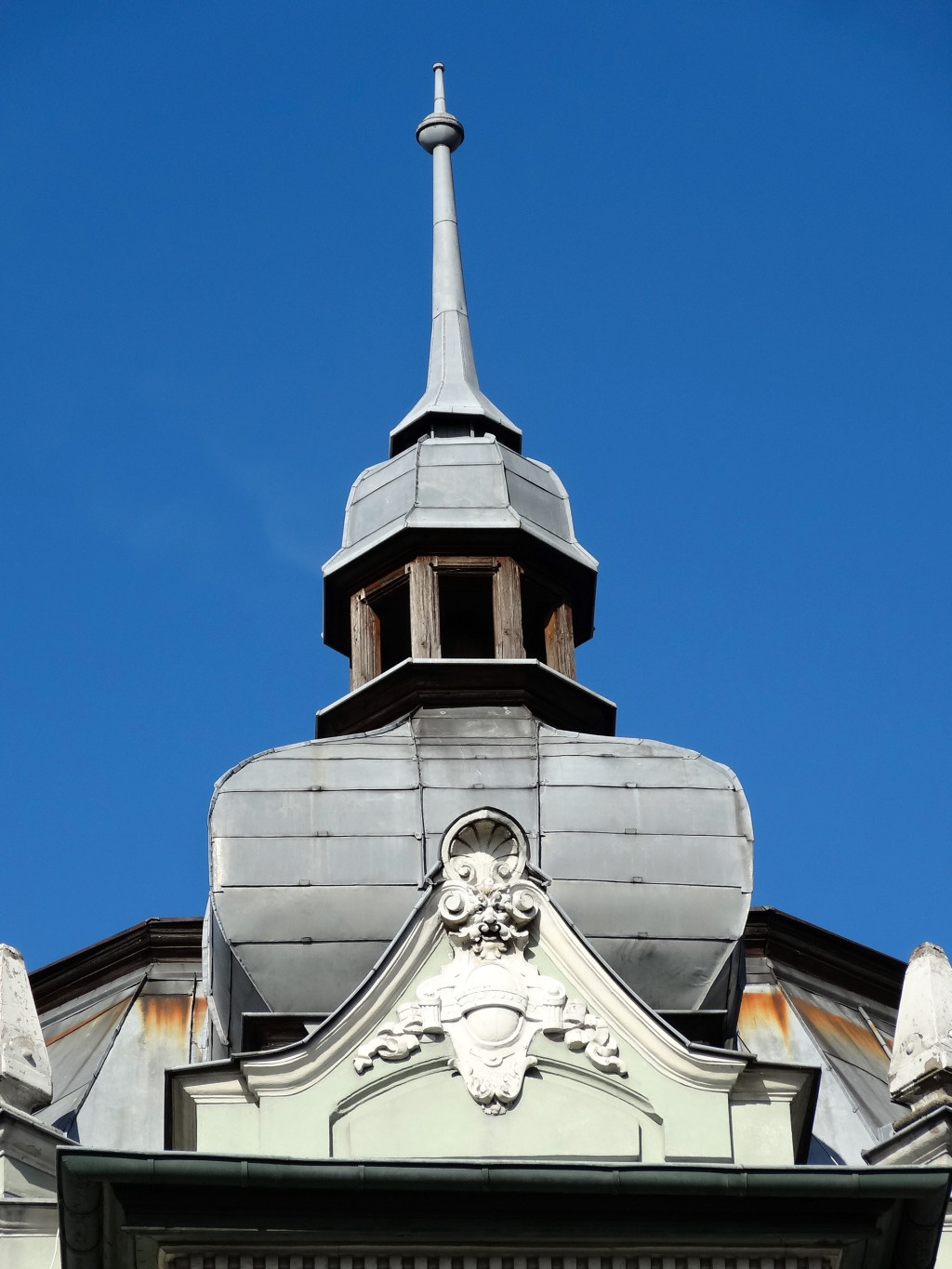
Spire detail

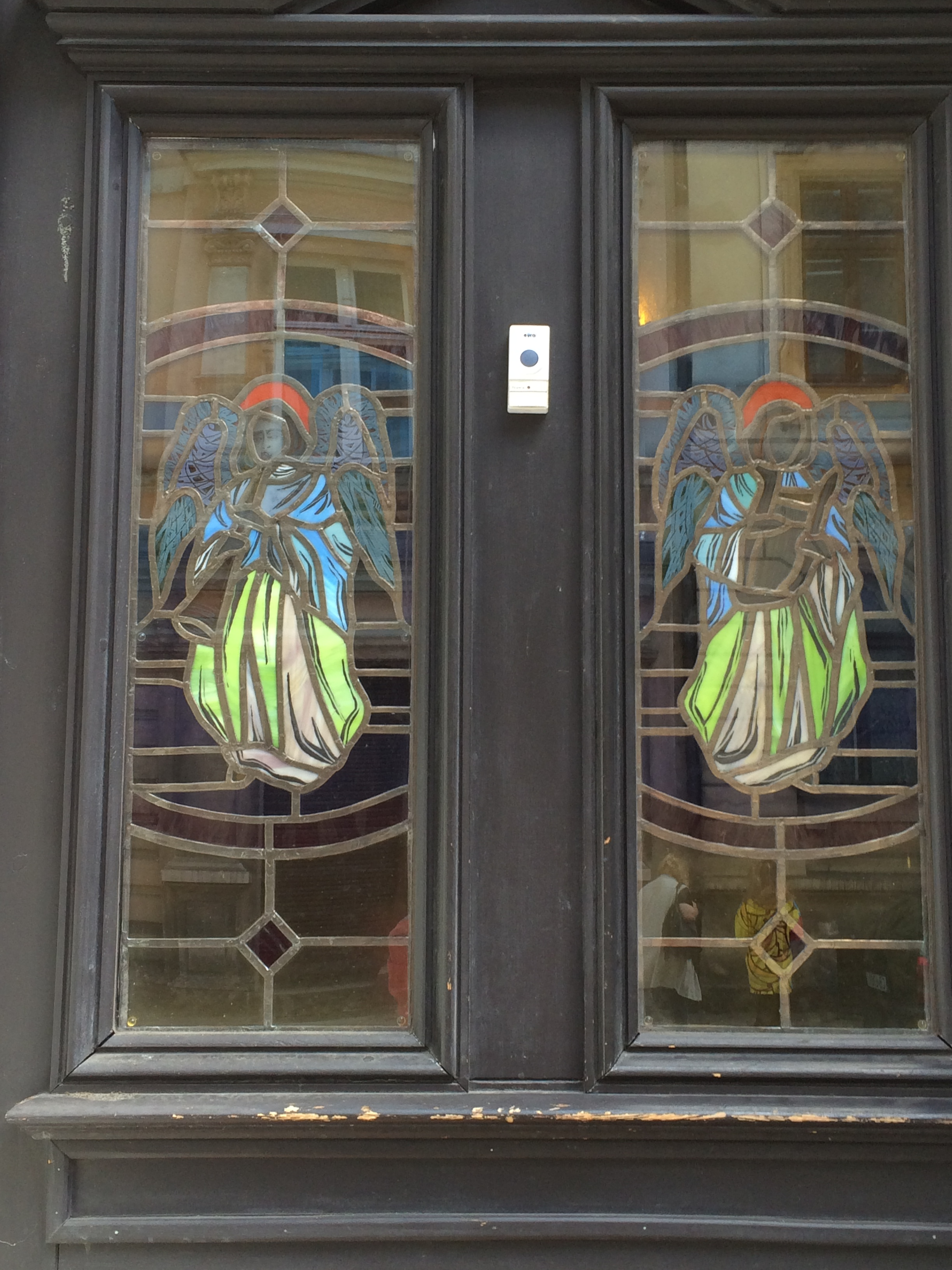
Stained glass door
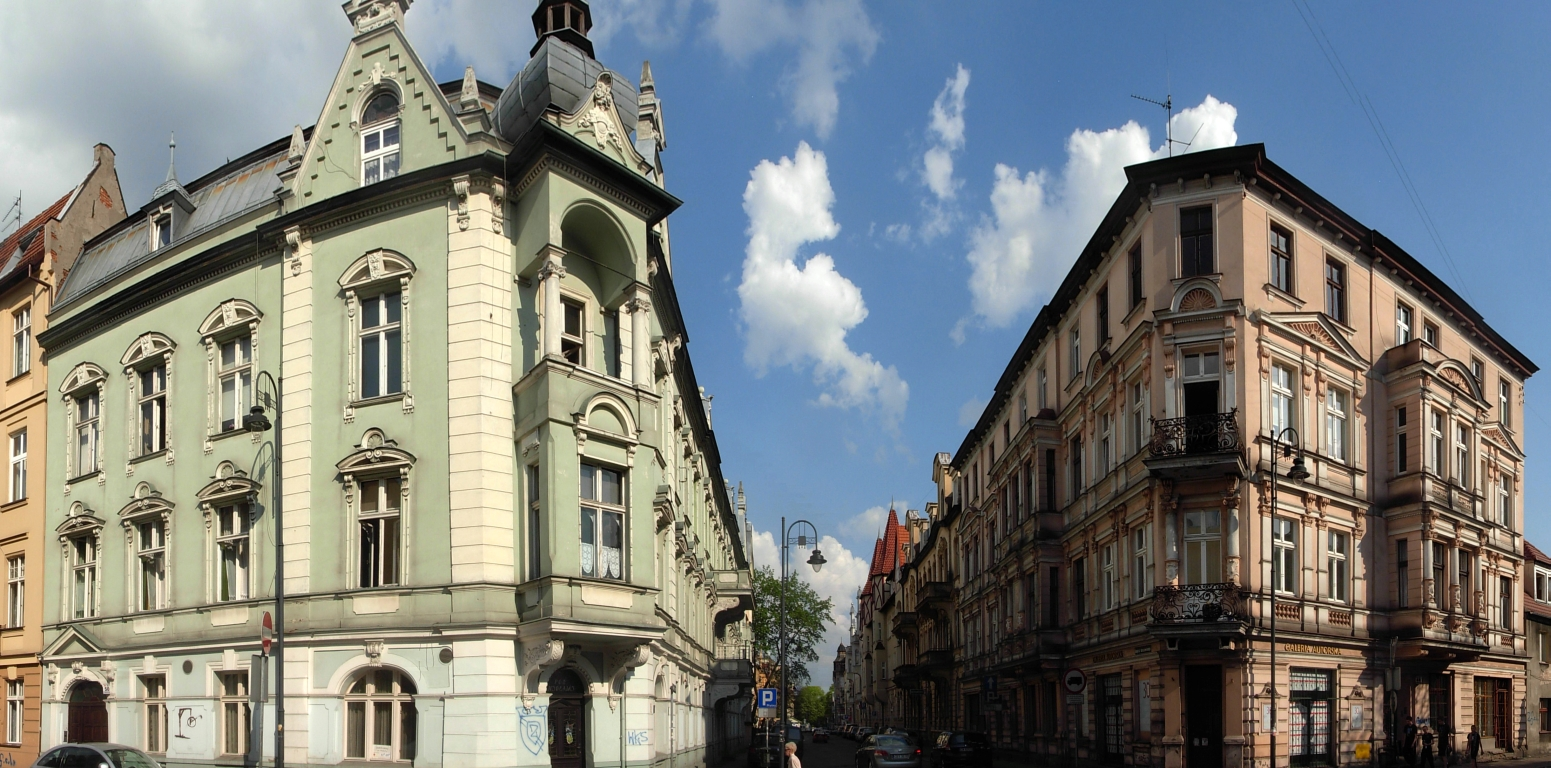
Corner houses at 48 (right) and 50 (left) Pomorska street

== See also ==
- Bydgoszcz
- August Cieszkowski
- Józef Święcicki
- Bydgoszcz Architects (1850-1970s)
- Rudolf Kern
- Fritz Weidner

== Bibliography ==
- (in Polish) Derenda, Jerzy (2006). Piękna stara Bydgoszcz. Tom I z serii: Bydgoszcz miasto na Kujawach. Bydgoszcz: Towarzystwo Miłośników Miasta Bydgoszczy. ISBN 9788391617854.
- (in Polish) Bręczewska-Kulesza, Daria. Przegląd stylów występujących w bydgoskiej architekturze drugiej połowy XIX i początku XX stulecia. Bydgoszcz.
- (in Polish) Jastrzębska-Puzowska, Iwona (2005). Od miasteczka do metropolii. Rozwój architektoniczny i urbanistyczny Bydgoszczy w latach 1850-1920. Toruń: Wydawnictwo MADO. ISBN 8389886383.
- (in Polish) Umiński, Janusz (1996). Bydgoszcz. Przewodnik. Bydgoszcz: Regionalny Oddział PTTK. ISBN 8389886383.
- (in Polish) Winter, Piotr (1996). Ulica Augusta Cieszkowskiego w Bydgoszczy. Zespół architektoniczny z przełomu XIX i XX wieku. Bydgoszcz: Wojewódzki Ośrodek Kultury w Bydgoszczy.
- (in Polish) Parucka, Krystyna (2008). Zabytki Bydgoszczy – minikatalog. Bydgoszcz: "Tifen" Krystyna Parucka. ISBN 9788392719106.
