= Pomorska Street, Bydgoszcz =

Street in Bydgoszcz, Poland

Coordinates: 53°07′57″N 18°00′20″E

Pomorska Street
Bydgoszcz
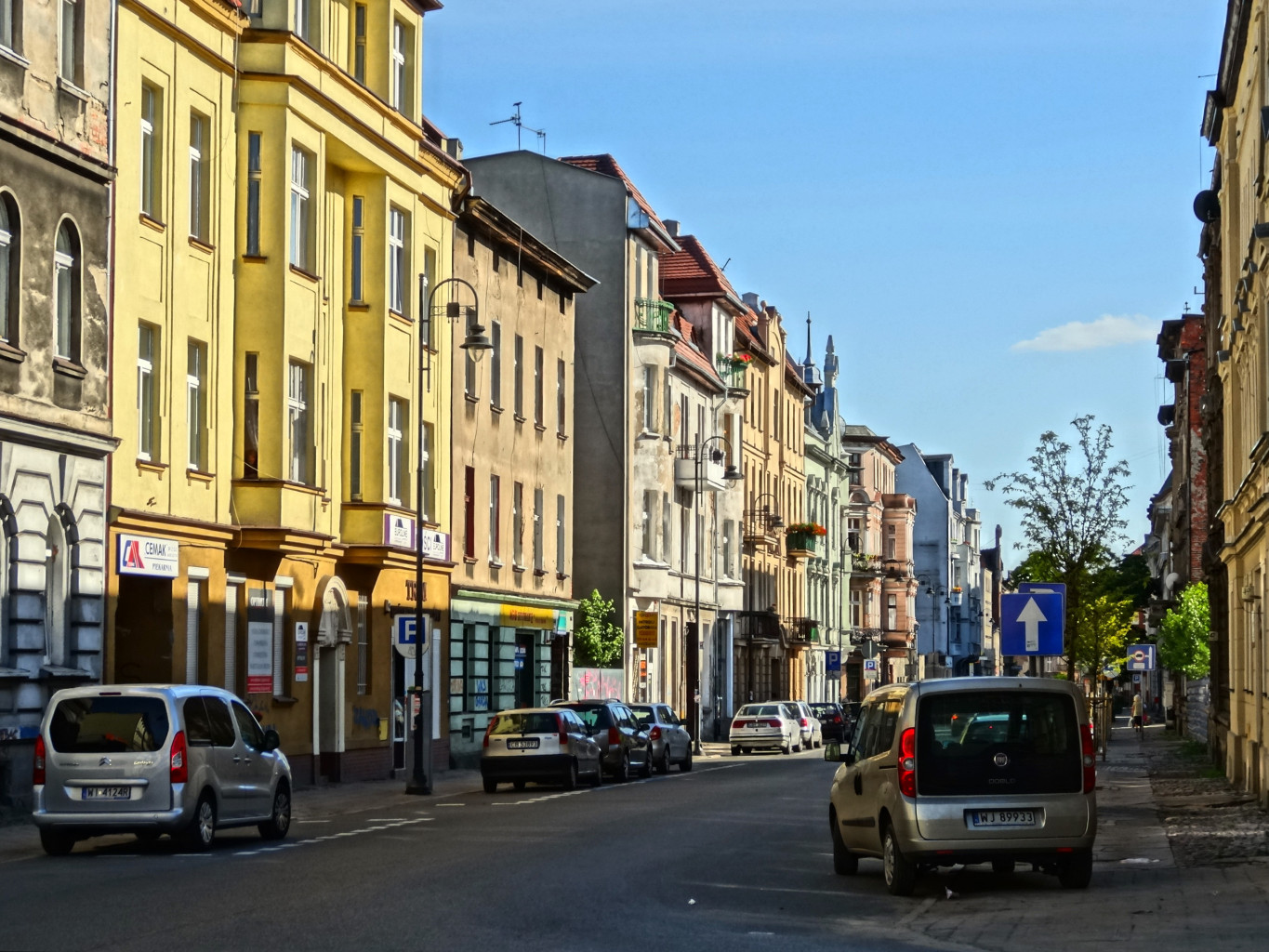
- View of the street

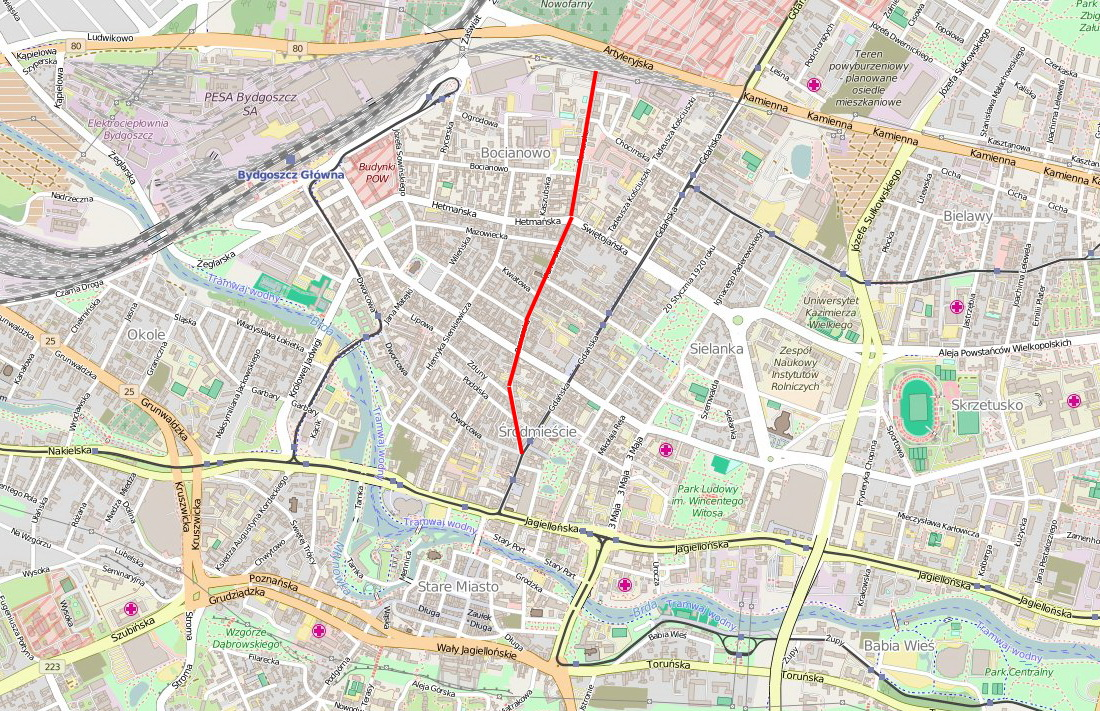
- Location of Pomorska Street
- Native name: Ulica Pomorska (Polish)
- Former names: Rinkauerstraße, Ulica Szczecińska
- Namesake: Kuyavian-Pomeranian Voivodeship
- Owner: City of Bydgoszcz
- Length: 1,400 m (4,600 ft); Google maps
- Area: Downtown district
- Location: Bydgoszcz, Poland

Pomorska Street is an important street in downtown Bydgoszcz.

== Location ==
Pomorska Street is roughly oriented south–north, starting from Gdańska Street up to the railway line to the north. It crosses important thoroughfares, such as Śniadeckich Street, Cieszkowski Street or Swiętojańska street.

== Naming ==
Through history, the street had the following names:

- Before 1920, "Der weg nach Schwetz" (Road to Świecie), then "Rinkauerstraße" (from Rinkau -Polish: Rynkowo-, a village north of Bromberg)
- 1920–1939, Ulica Pomorska (southern part)-Ulica Szczecińska (northern part)
- 1939–1945, Robert Ley Straße
- since 1945, Ulica Pomorska

Current namesake of the street comes from the Kuyavian-Pomeranian Voivodeship.

== History ==
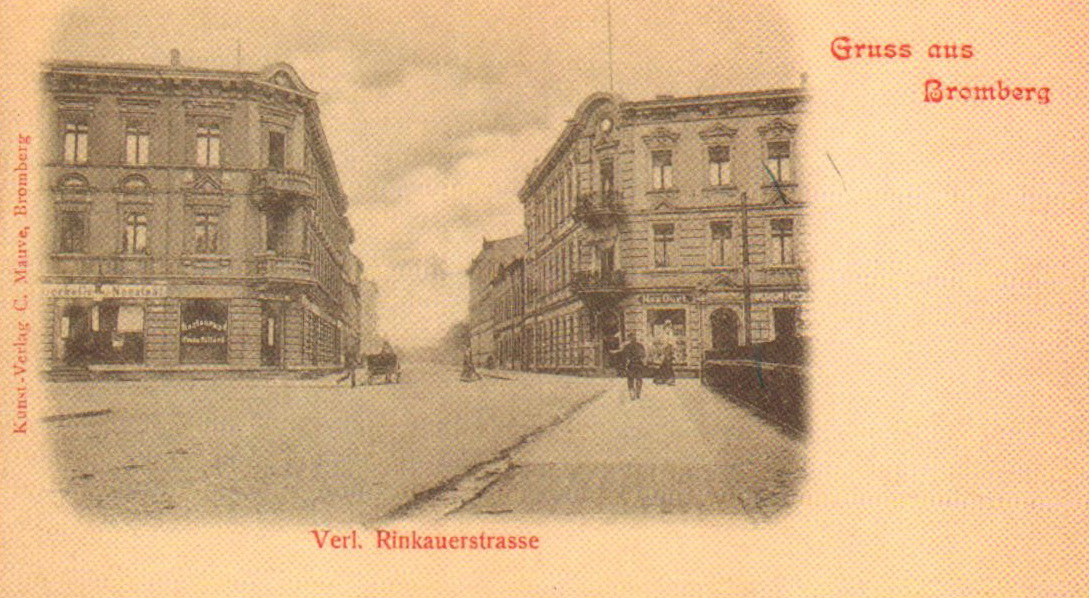
View of northern part of Pomorska ca 1907

The axis has since long been the path linking Bydgoszcz to Świecie, German: Schwetz, hence its name on one of the first recorded maps from 1800, "Der weg nach Schwetz" (The road to Świecie).

In fact, this path was an historical thoroughfare, existing before Gdańska Street, much like the way Dworcowa Street came to existence. During the second part of the 19th century, the growing extension of the city led to the shaping of the avenue, called Rinkauerstraße under Prussian rule.

In 1867, with a new territory extension of the city, the whole street was comprised within the municipal area. Its northern tip "Verlängerte Rinkauerstraße" (Extended Rinkauer street) was the location of Prussian army barracks, German: Kaserne Rinkau: the Infanterie-Regiment Nr. 148 was part of the 41st Division in the pre-World War I organization.

After the end of World War I and the rebirth of Poland, the street has been renamed "Pomorska" in its southern part and "Szczecińska" in its northern part (old Extended Rinkauer street), where the 61st Infantry Regiment (Polish: 61 Pułk Piechoty) was billeted.

During World War II, Nazi authorities renamed the avenue Robert Ley Straße. At the end of the conflict, the street got back its original calling, along its whole length.

== Main places and buildings ==
=== Alexander Timm House at 17 Gdańska Street, corner with Pomorska Street ===
Built in 1852 by B. Brinkmann, and 1910 by O.F.W. Muller

Eclecticism & Neoclassicism.

At the time of its erection, it was the largest habitation house in Bydgoszcz.

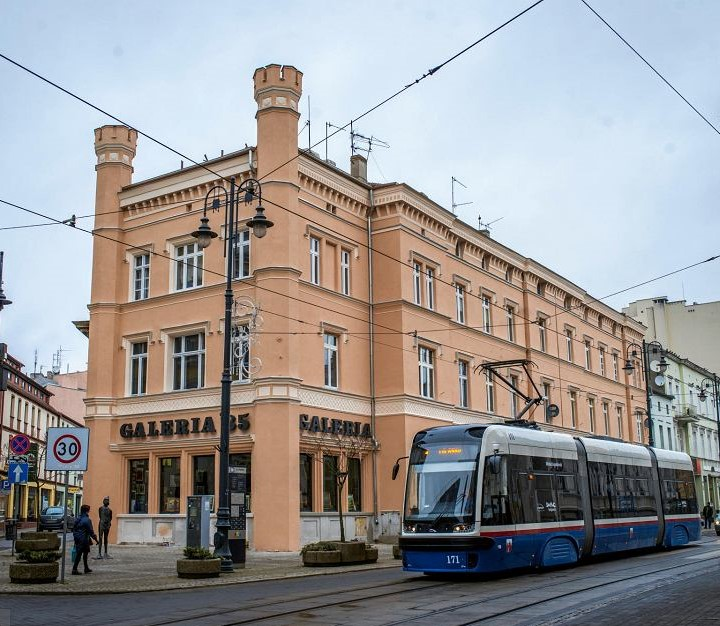
Facade onto Gdańska Street

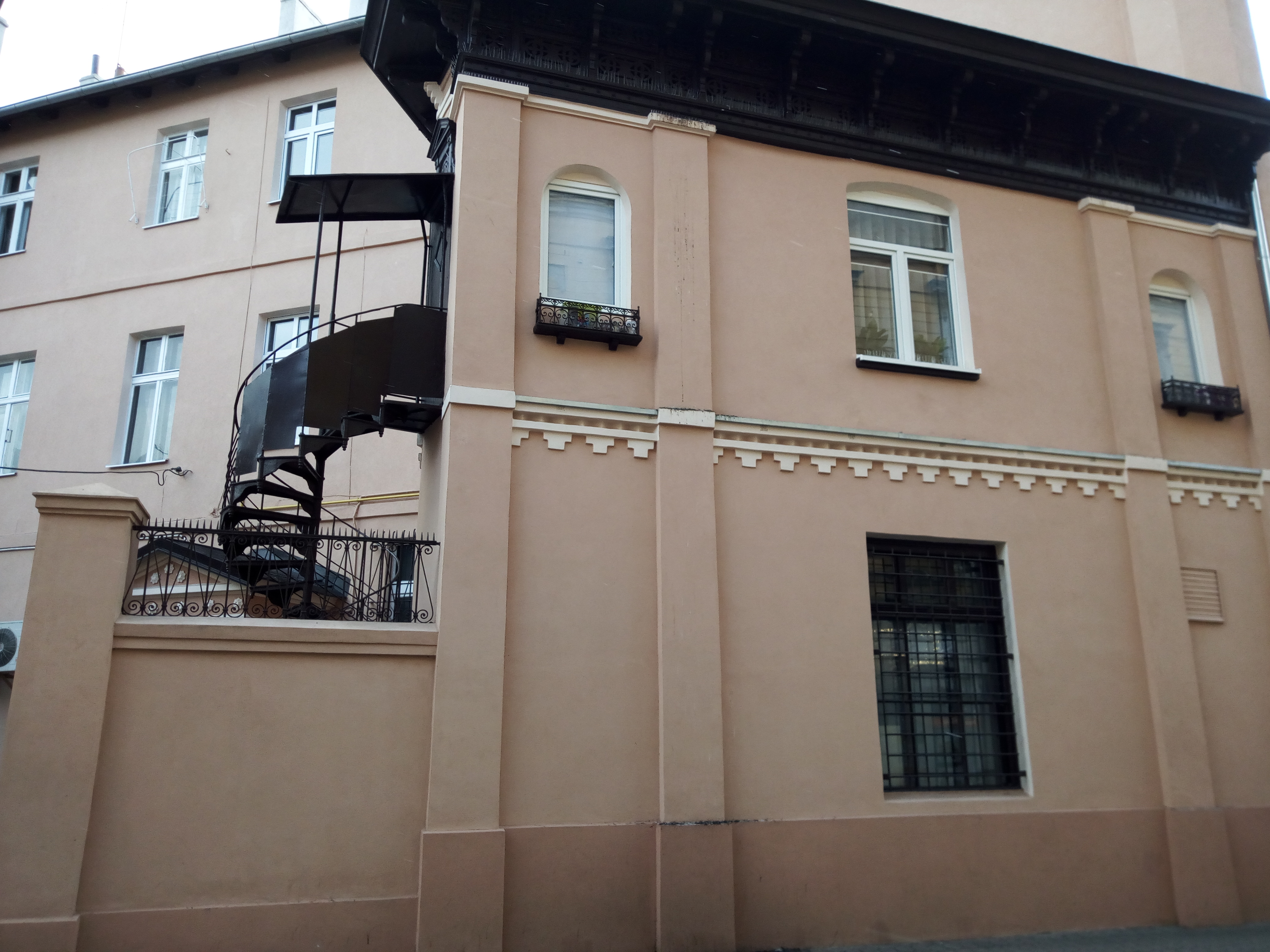
Detail of architectural motifs

=== Tenement at 1, corner with 2 Dworcowa Street ===
1884, by Karl Bergner

Eclecticism

This corner house has been commissioned by Mr Jäfel, a lithograph. In 1908, a drugstore run by Dr Aurel Kratz opened there: he was also selling goods for cameras until World War I. He then moved to Friedrichstraße.

The building is on a triangular footprint plot, a challenge for the designer. It displays a nice bay window on the corner facade. The first floor windows, around the bay-window are more adorned than others with flanking pilasters topped with corbels and a frieze of ornaments. The second floors windows are capped by triangular pediments and have also small corbels and pilasters. The 3rd level openings are only flanked by clean pilasters and pediment topped. A line of designed corbels runs beneath the roof.

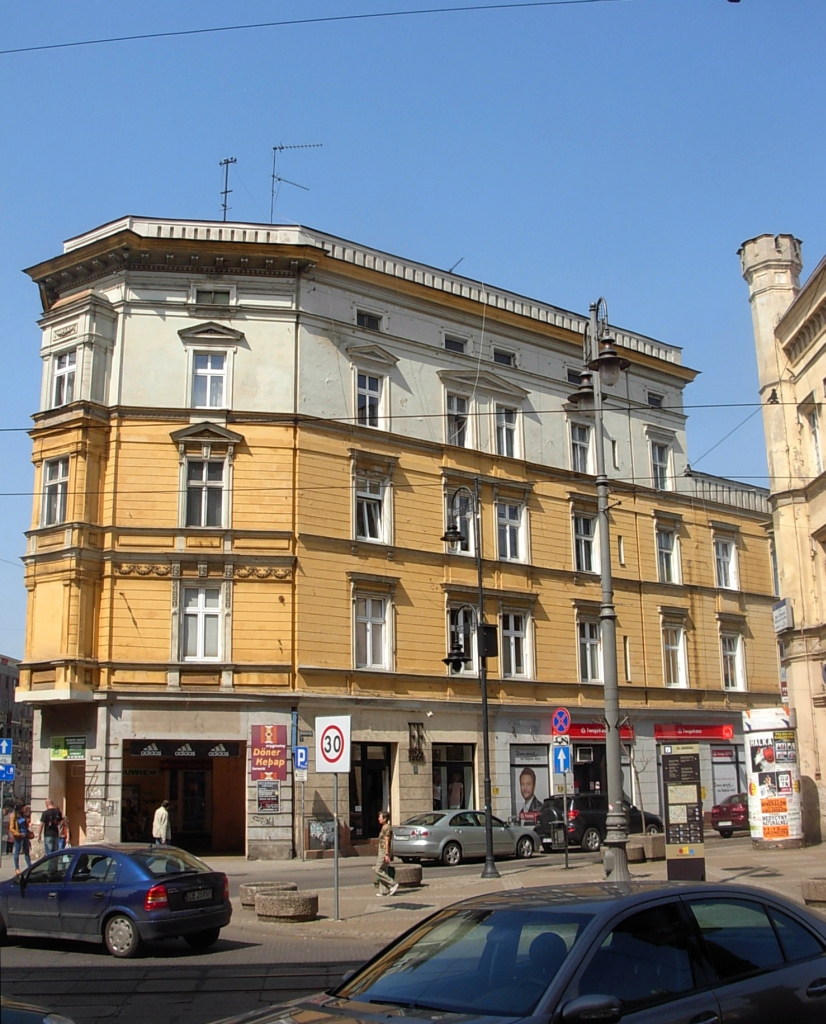
Facade onto Pomorska Street

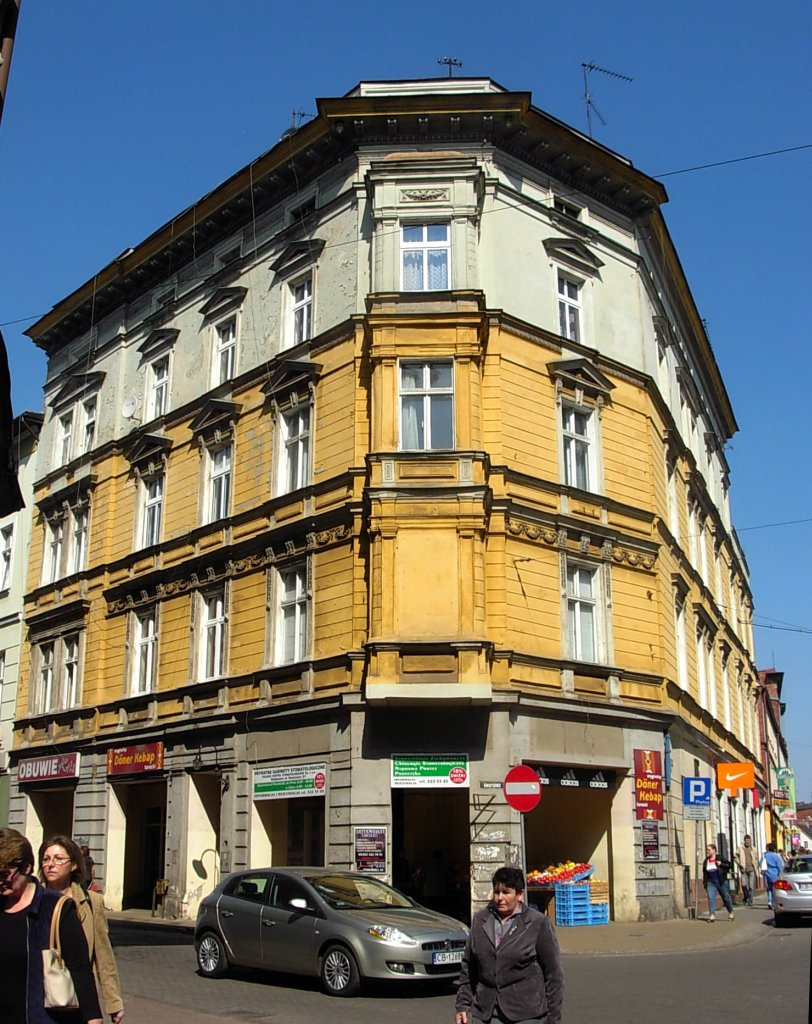
View from Gdańska Street

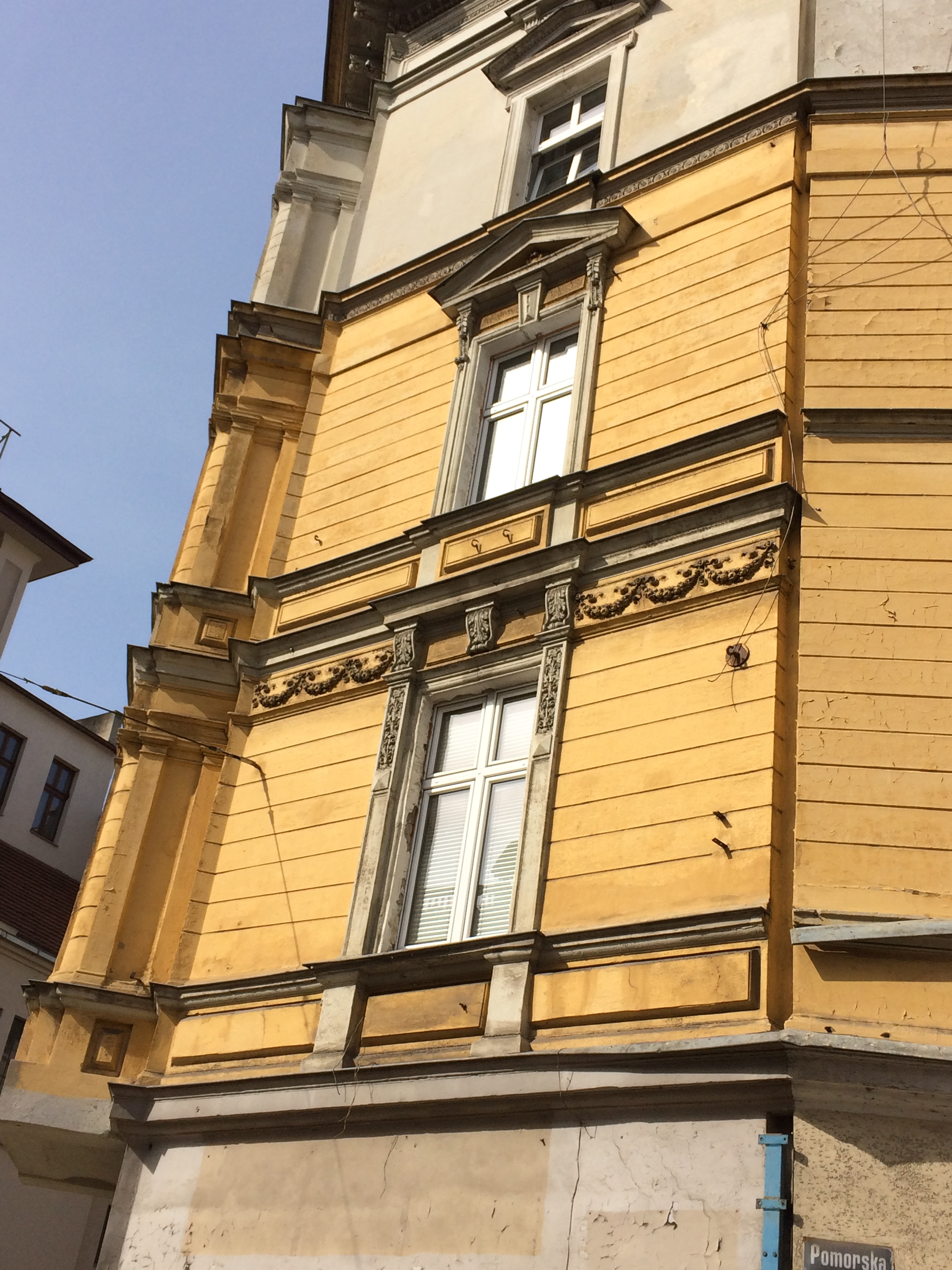
Detail of the corner house

=== Wilhelm ßiehl tenement, at 3 ===
Registered on Kuyavian-Pomeranian Voivodeship heritage list, Nr.727947, Reg.A/1530, April 4, 2009

1878

Eclecticism & Neo-renaissance

The house was commissioned by Wilhelm ßiehl, a baker, who lived in Bahnhofstraße. At this time, it was one of the first habitation building to be erected in the street. Wilhelm ßiehl had the tenement rebuilt in 1895 to accommodate more tenants.

The facade, renovated in 2015, displays features of Neo-renaissance style: symmetry, recurrent motifs such as vegetal garlands and pediments on first level windows, series of corbels supporting the roof, thin topping frieze. Openings at ground floor have an ornamental decor repeating all along their frame.

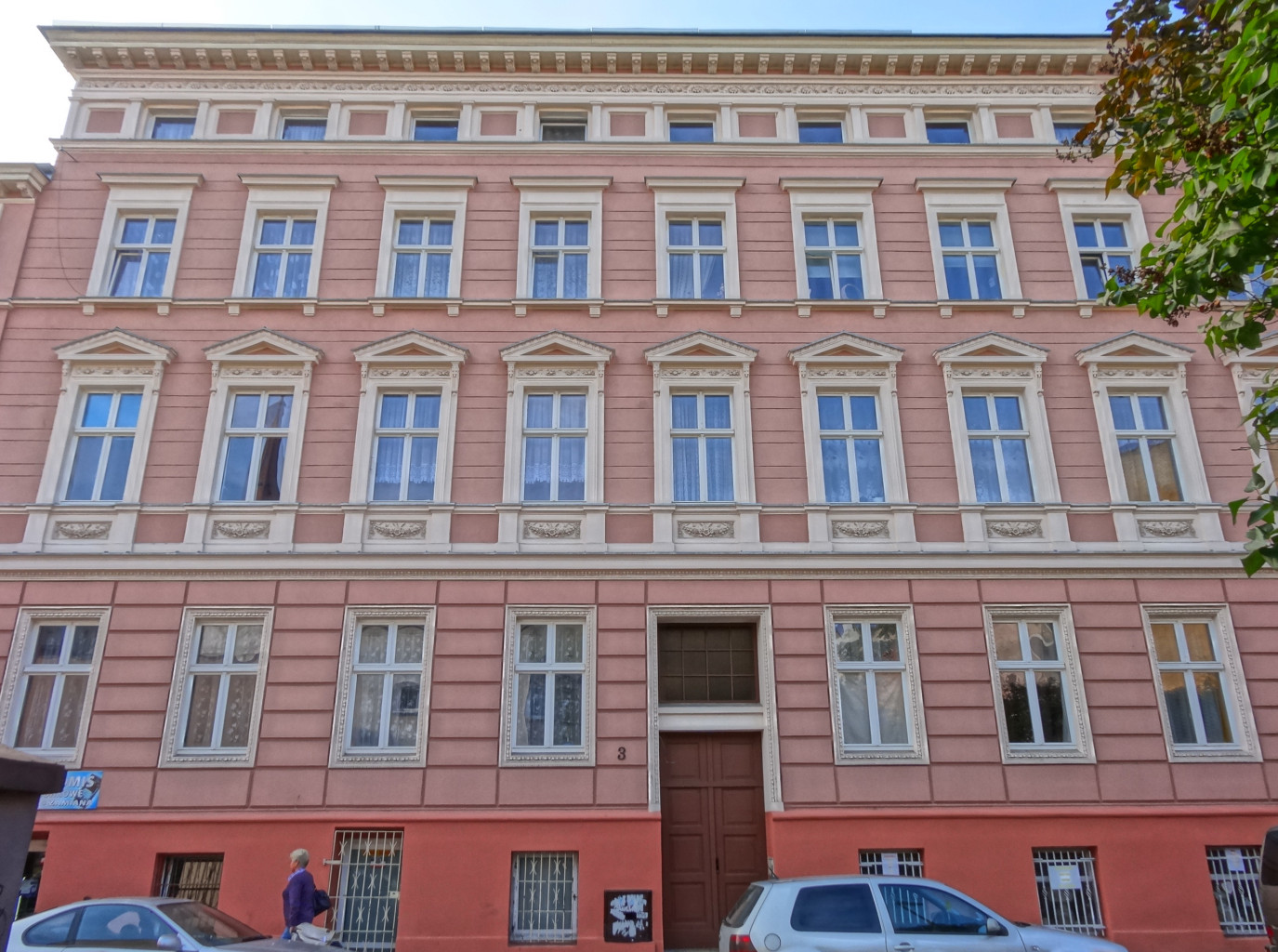
Main facade

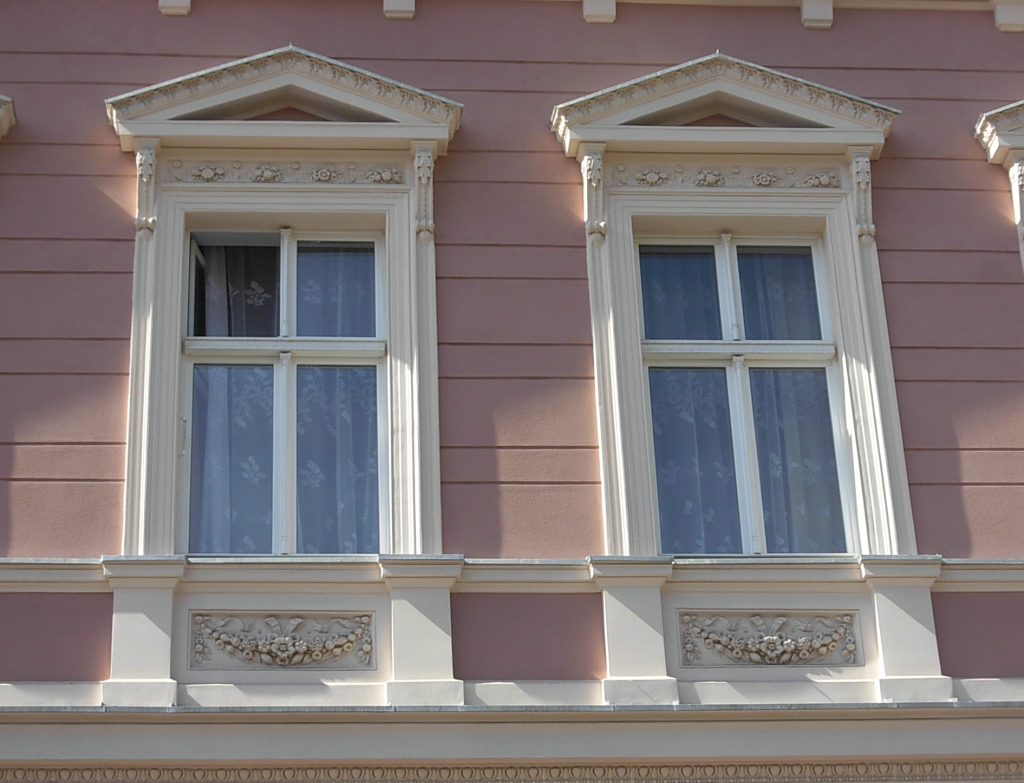
Decoration details on first floor

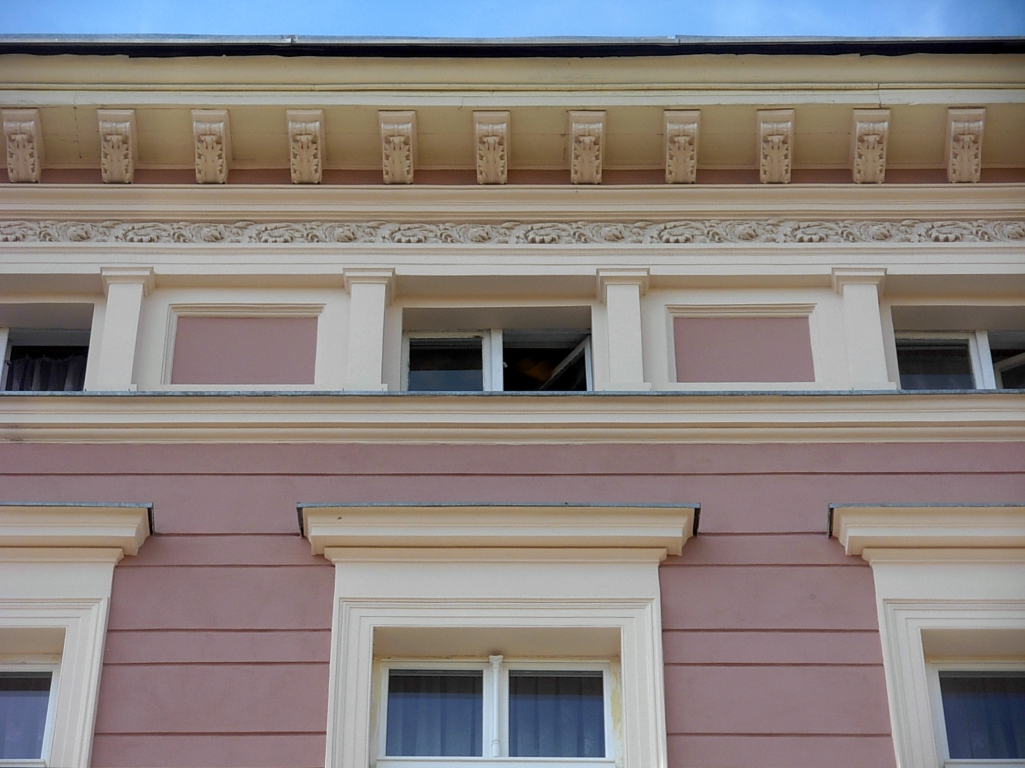
Detail of frieze and corbels

=== Carl Lachmann tenement, corner house at 1 Podolska Street ===
1906–1908

German Historicism

The house was commissioned by Carl Lachman, a butcher, owner of a company producing meat, the Gebrüder Lachmann seated at nearby Bahnhofstraße 95a (now Nr.8). Present corner was located at Rinkauerstraße 4/Buchholzstraße 1.

The facade, renovated in 2015, reminds of the realizations of Fritz Weidner, a fertile architect in Bydgoszcz between 1897 and the 1930s. He designed famous houses in the city, such as in Gdańska Street (28, 79, 34) or at 2 Śniadeckich Street. The house presents forms of German historicism, in a transitional phase between the eclecticism and secession style. Both elevations are purposefully designed on asymmetry, as a means of architectural expression, like the gables' shape, the only bay window in the corner or even the location of the entry gate. Care have been put in the adornment of the latter, in the complexity, both, of the door itself and the rich ornament framing the gate.

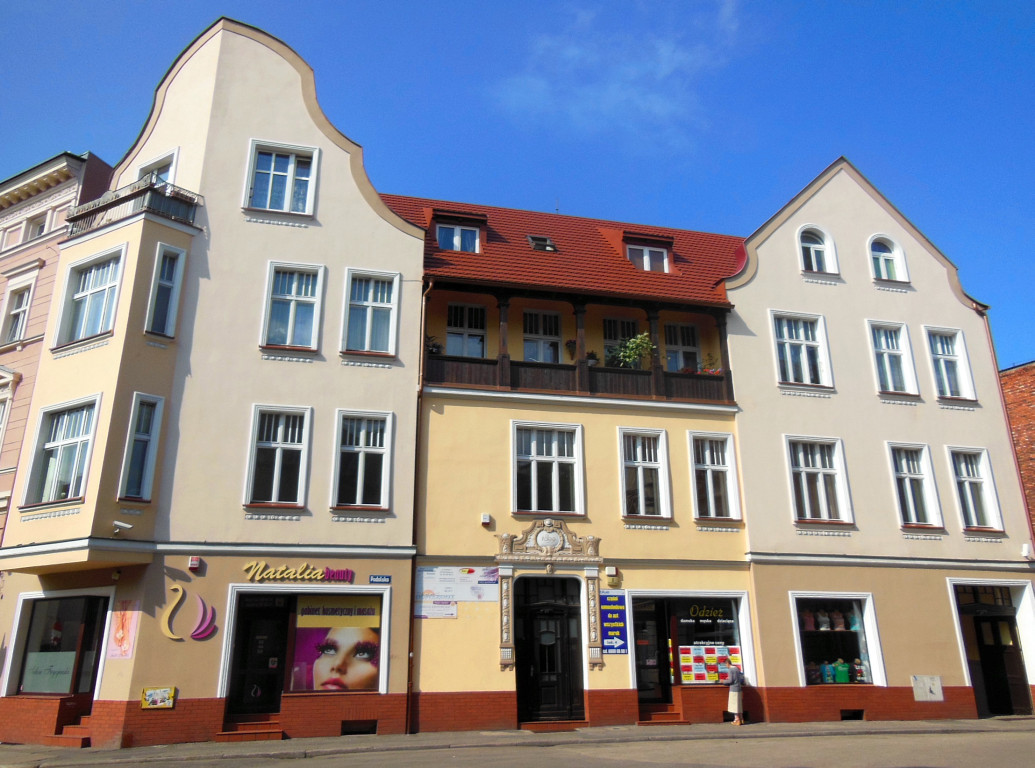
Main facade on Podolska Street

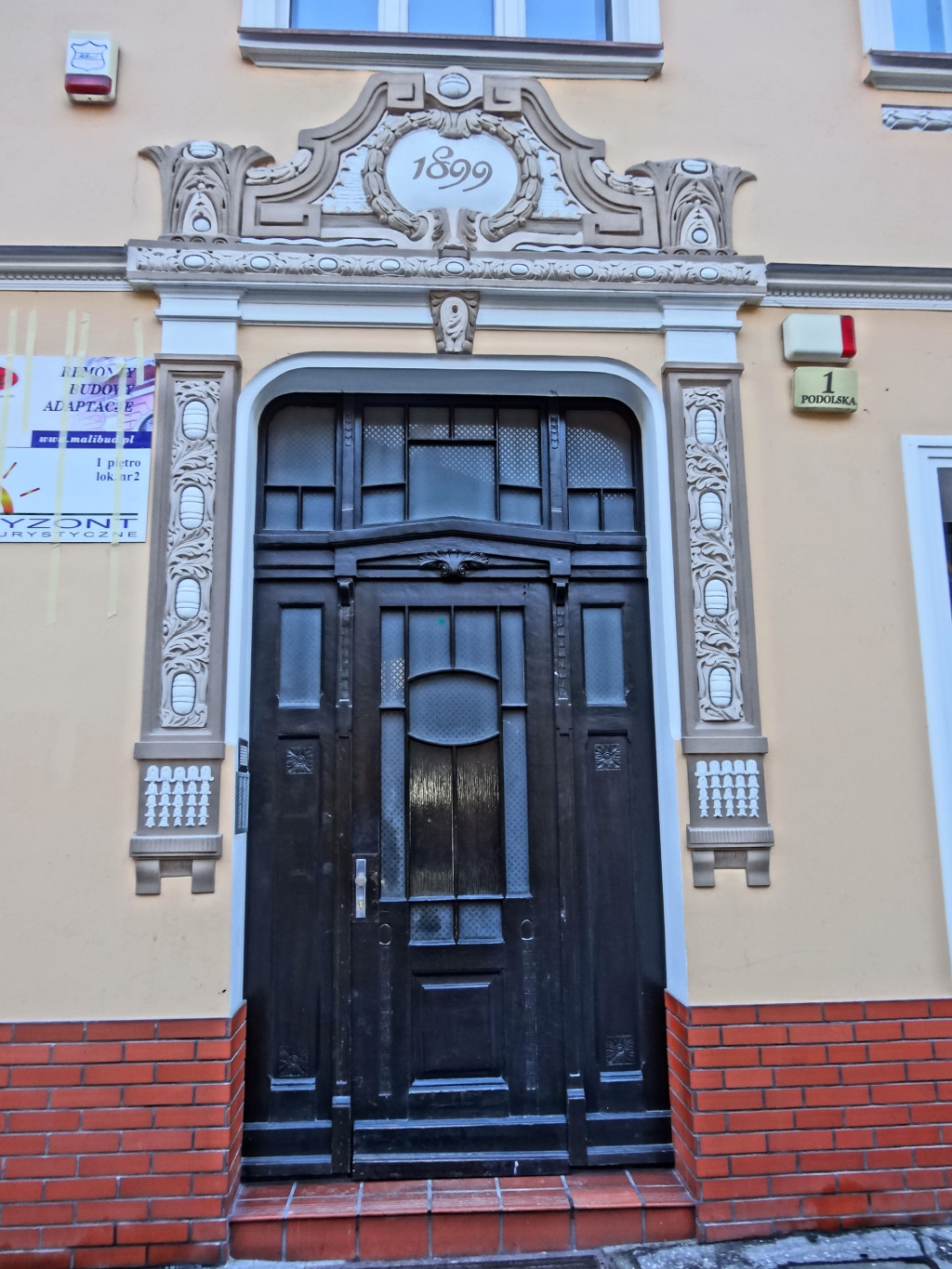
Detail of gate decoration

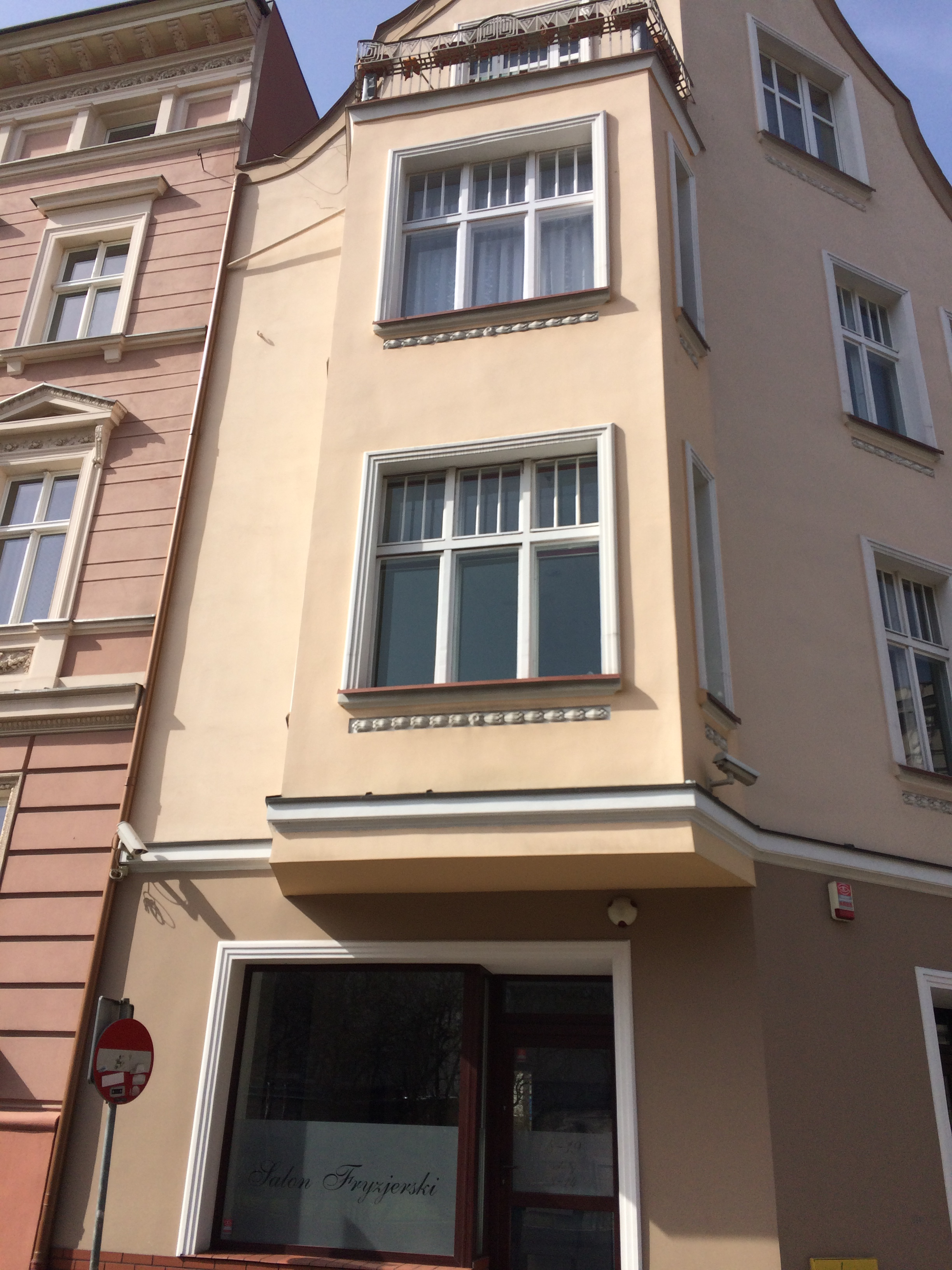
Bay window

=== Albert Voigt Tenement, at 5 ===
Registered on Kuyavian-Pomeranian Voivodeship heritage list, Nr.601394, Reg.A/996, February 4, 1992

1896, by Józef Józef Święcicki

Eclecticism

The house was commissioned by Albert Voigt, a railway clerk. In 1910, a restaurant was run there by Christian Rollauer. In 1923, the building renovated by families Rodziewiczówna and Grzymala-Siedlecki was the first place to house a charity kitchen managed by the Union of Poles from the Eastern Borderlands (Polish: Związek Polaków z Kresów Wschodnich). Its goal was to help the displaced Poles victims of the borders changes after the Peace of Riga with USSR. After 1925 the kitchen, led by Anna von Helmersen, living at 12 Jan and Jędrzej Śniadeckich Street, moved to 17 Cieszkowskiego Street. Today, the tenement houses among others, associations Wujek Porada and Siedlisko, helping out people with alcoholism problems. The edifice underwent a rehabilitation in 2007.

Among corner buildings of Pomorska Street, this house stands out as it is not built according to a rectangular, but a triangular footprint (like the tenement at Nr.1): Józef Swiecicki met the requirement, perfectly creating a neo-baroque building skillfully closing the junction with Podolska street. The richness of the architecture echoes those displayed on other tenement by the same architect in the city, such as the Hotel "Pod Orlem" from 1896 or the Tenement at Freedom Square 1 from 1898. In particular some elements are to be underlined: - balconies on Pomorska facade with wrought iron balustrade; - lion masks motifs on the corner of the house; - angel faces with wings ornamenting all facades. The facade giving onto Podolska street has got more Neo-renaissance features.

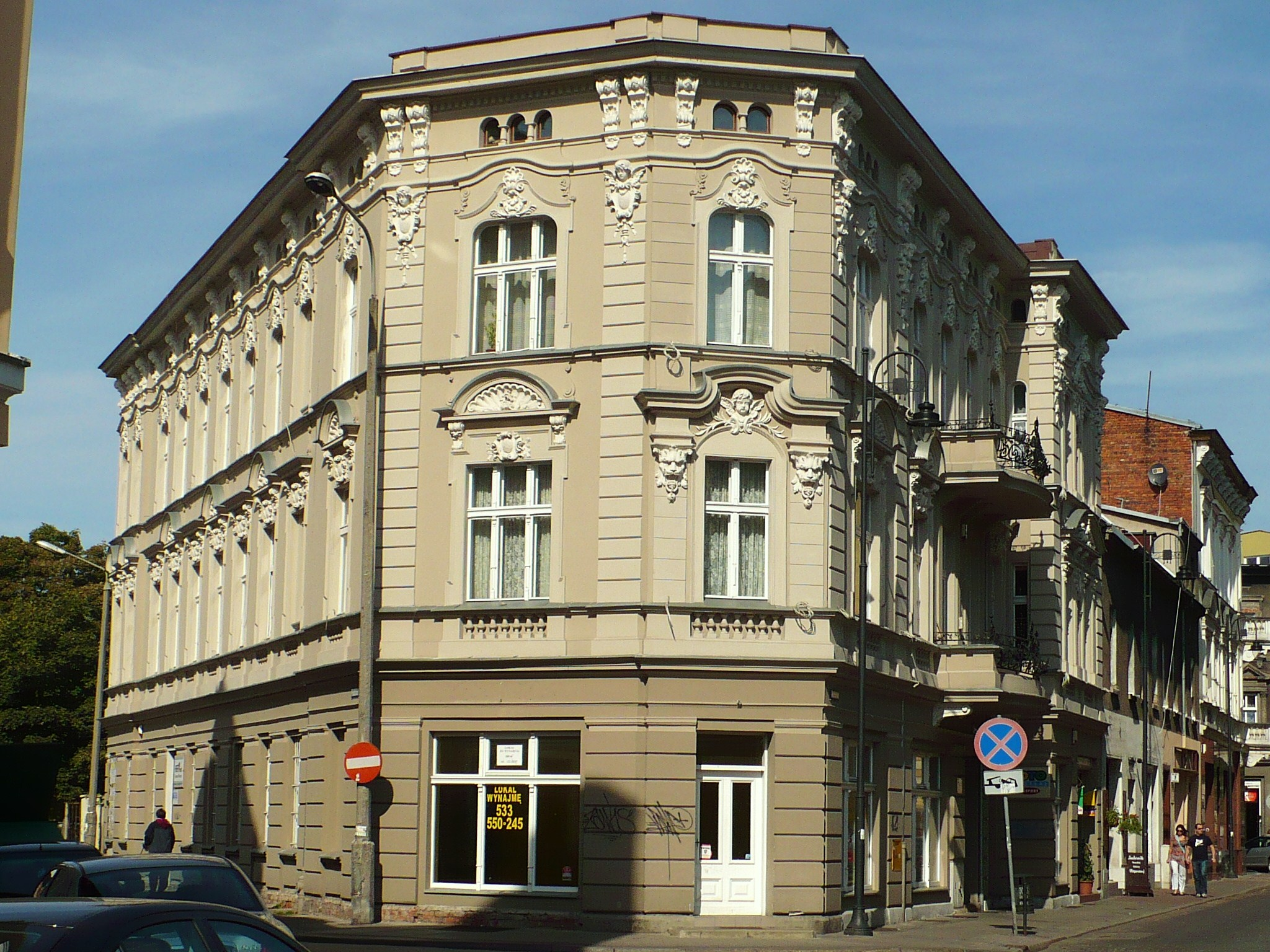
Main facades

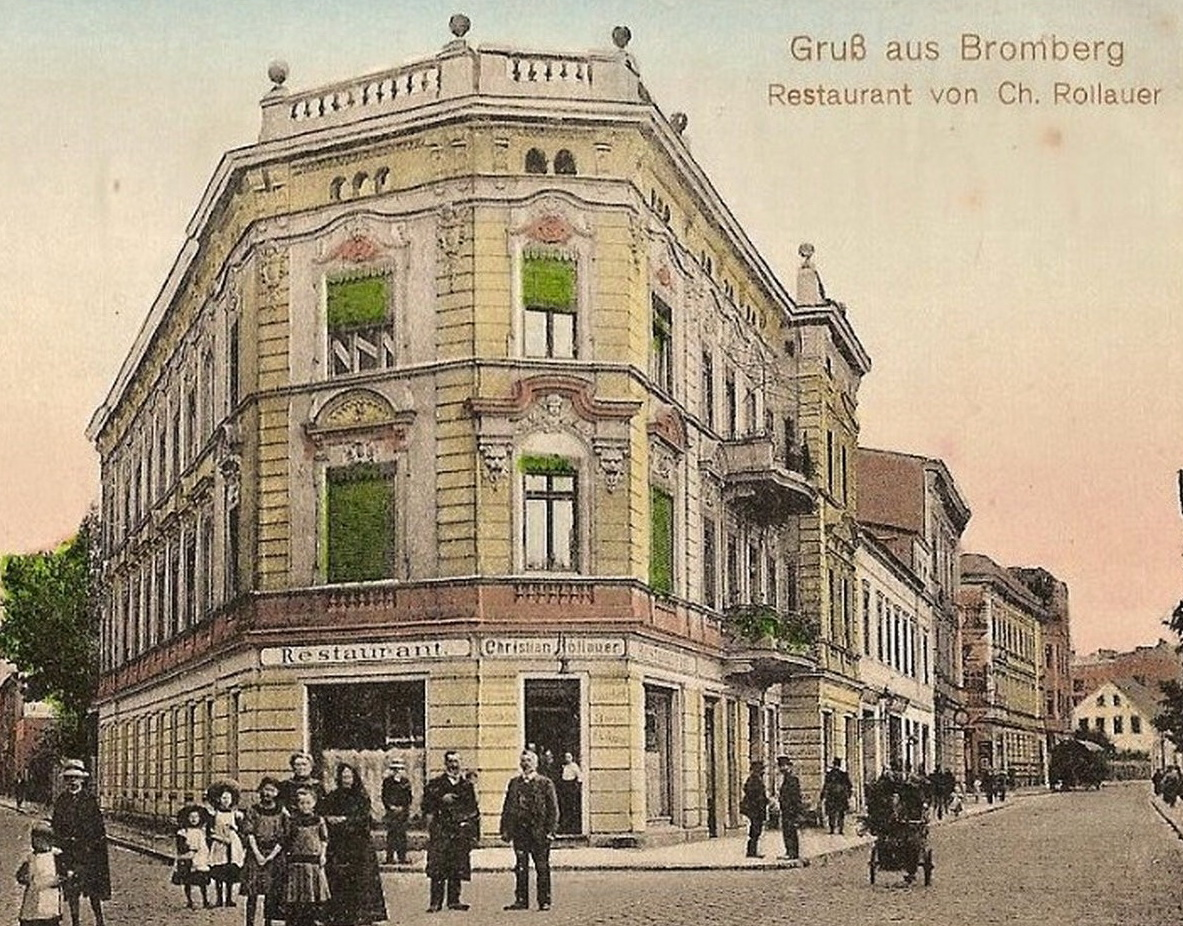
The house on a postcard in 1910

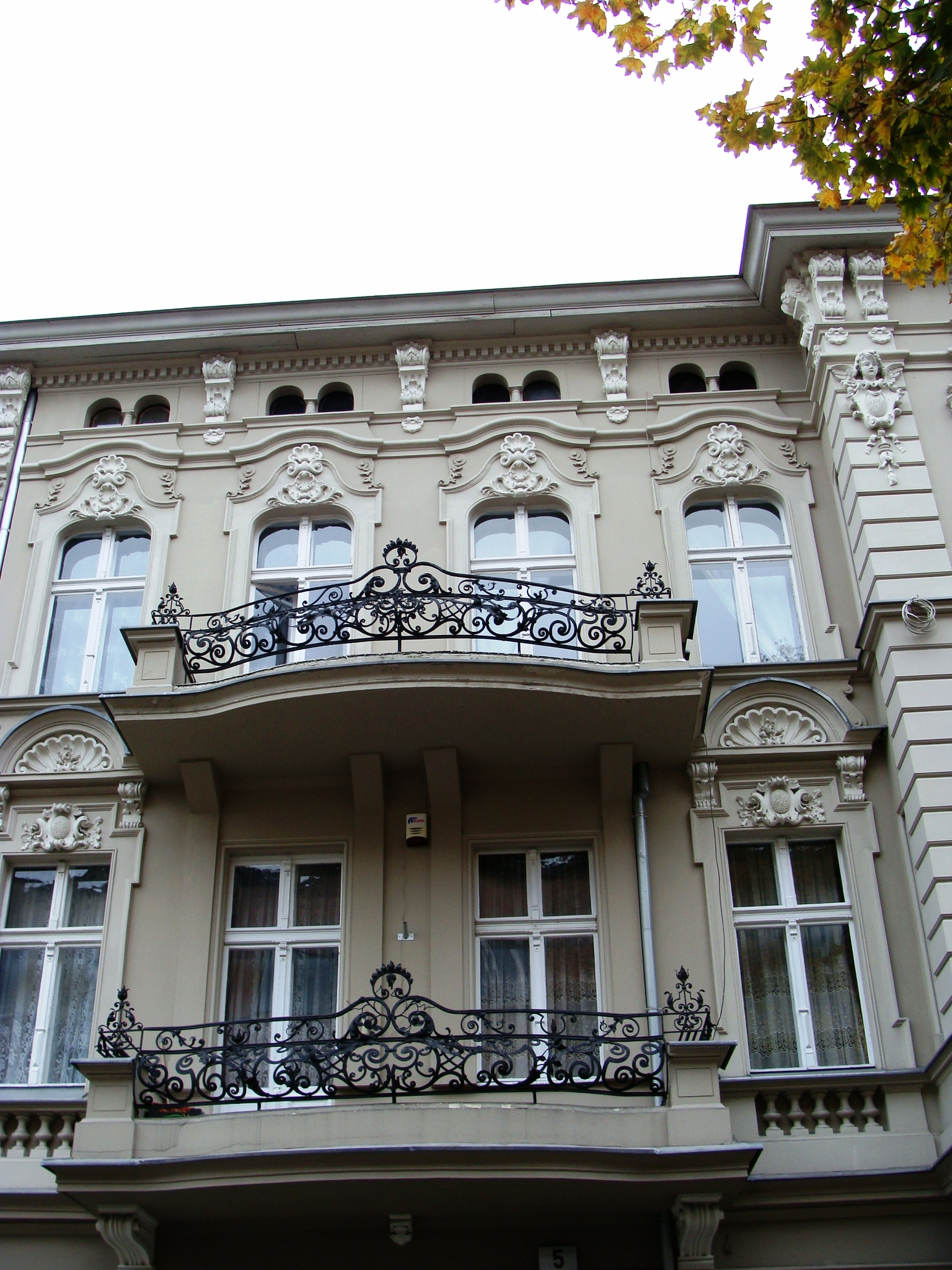
Balconies with wrought iron balustrade

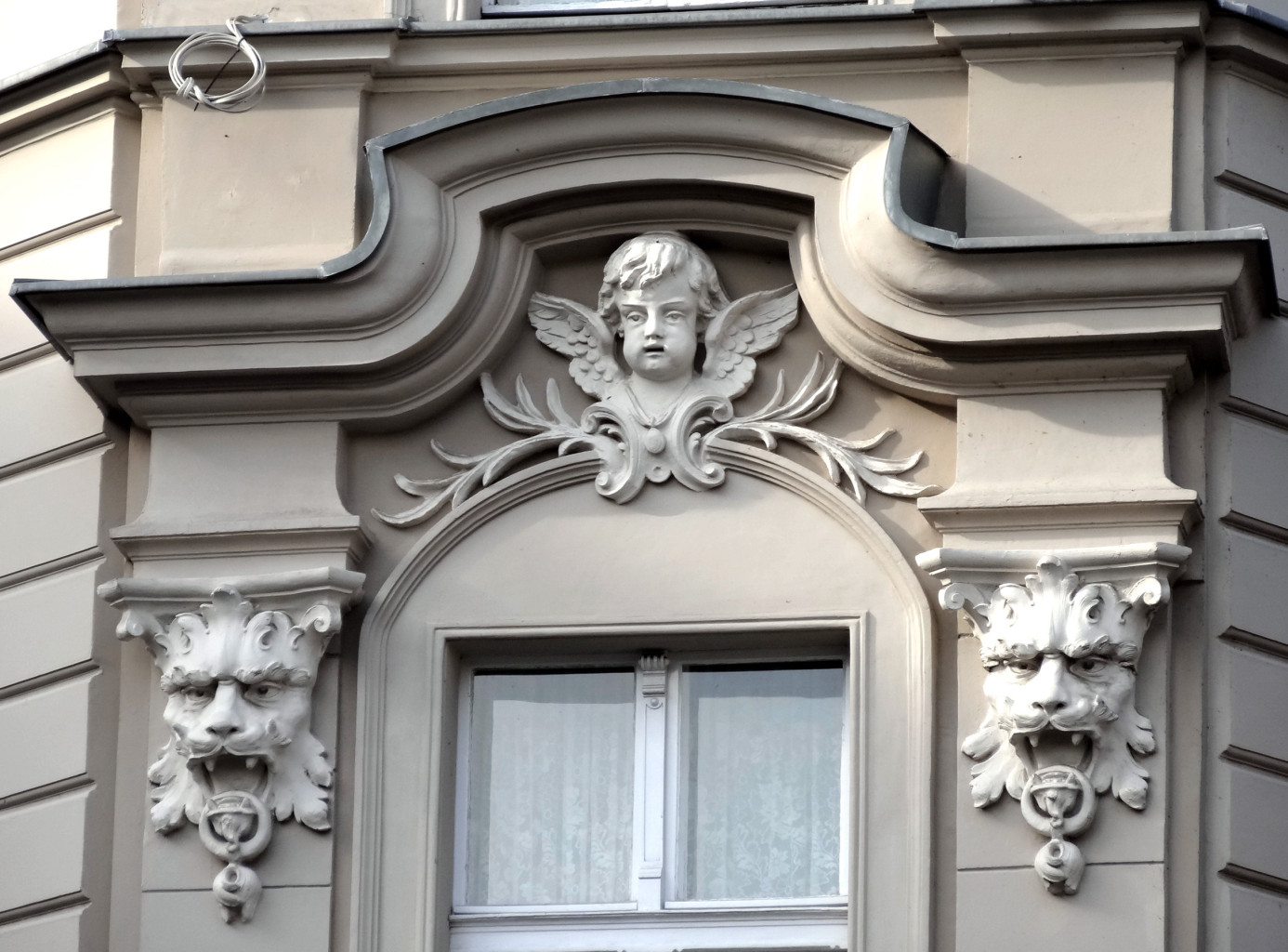
Detail of lion masks motifs

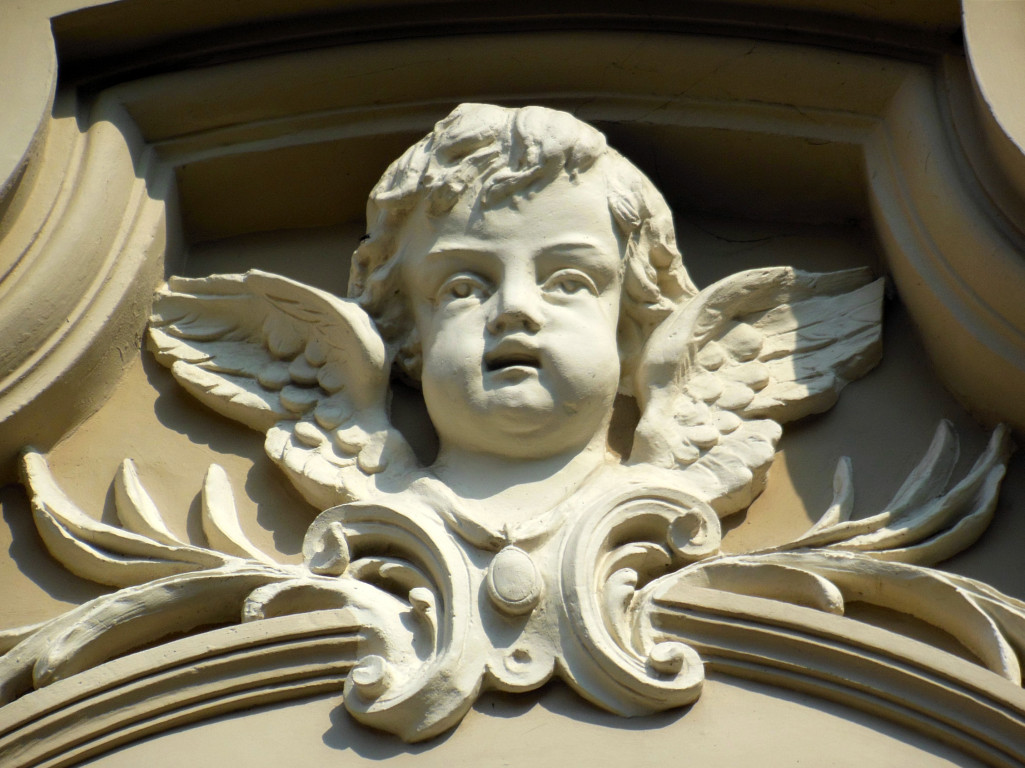
Angel decoration

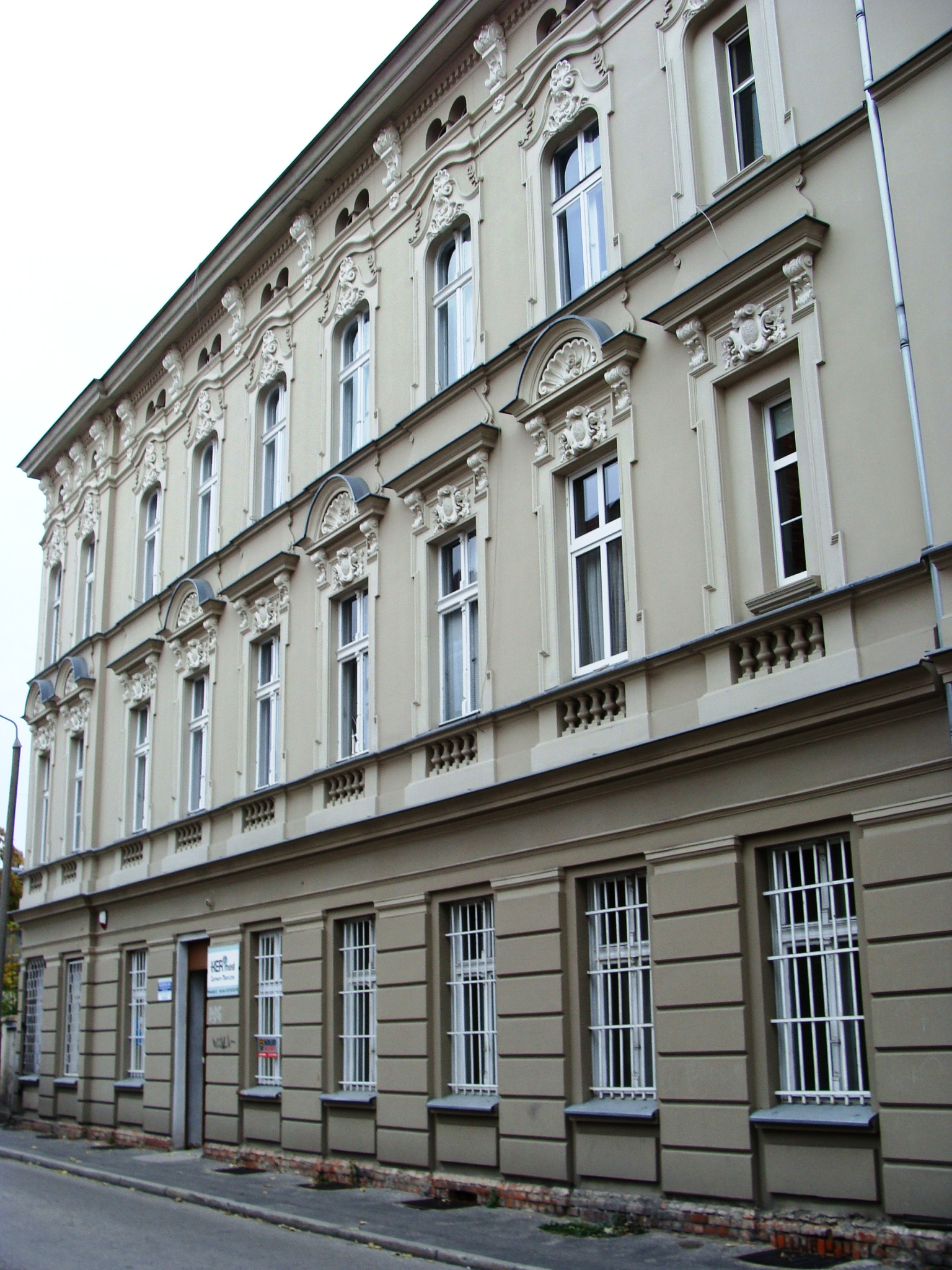
Elevation on Podolska street

=== Building at 6 ===
1934, by Mieczysław Krąkowski

Functionalism

The edifice has been commissioned in the 1930s by the Polish Telephone Joint-stock Company or PAST (Polish: Polska Akcyjna Spółka Telefoniczna) to host the local seat of Bydgoszcz. There were working the switchboard operator, mainly women, manually connecting local and/or distant calls.

The functionalist forms display smooth façades lined with ceramic tiles in its lower part. The entrance is supported by pillars and the wrought iron main door is decorated with a geometric pattern.

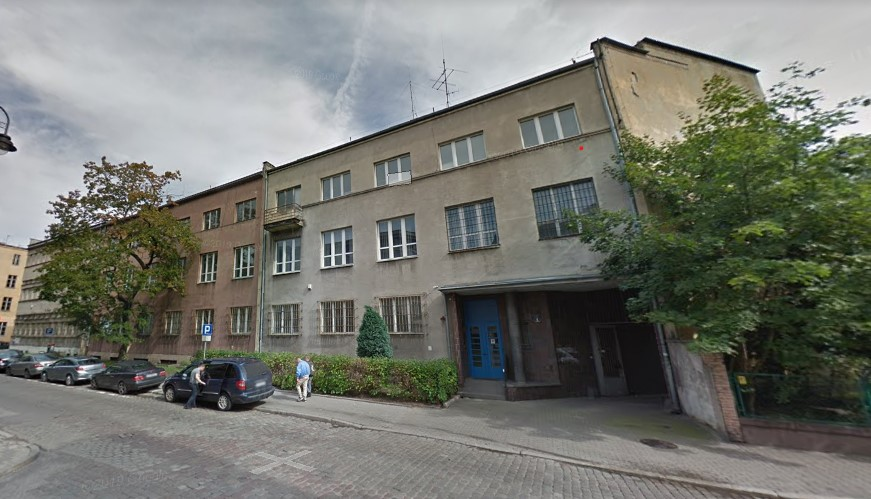
Main frontage

=== Tenement at 7A, corner house with 1 Zduny Street ===
1893–1894

Eclecticism

August Schild, a cooper had his barrel workshop and storage there from 1895 to 1903 (ancient address "Rinkauerstraße 7"). In 1904, Ignace Sergot, a painter, moved there from 13 Jan and Jędrzej Śniadeckich Street; he lived there until the middle of the 1920s.

This corner building displays various architectural elements of decoration on its facades, from triangular and half-circled pediments, to pilasters flanking the window openings, from discrete balustrades to prominent corbels under the roof. Worth mentioning are the two massive balconies overhanging streets crossing, with salient balusters and consoles.

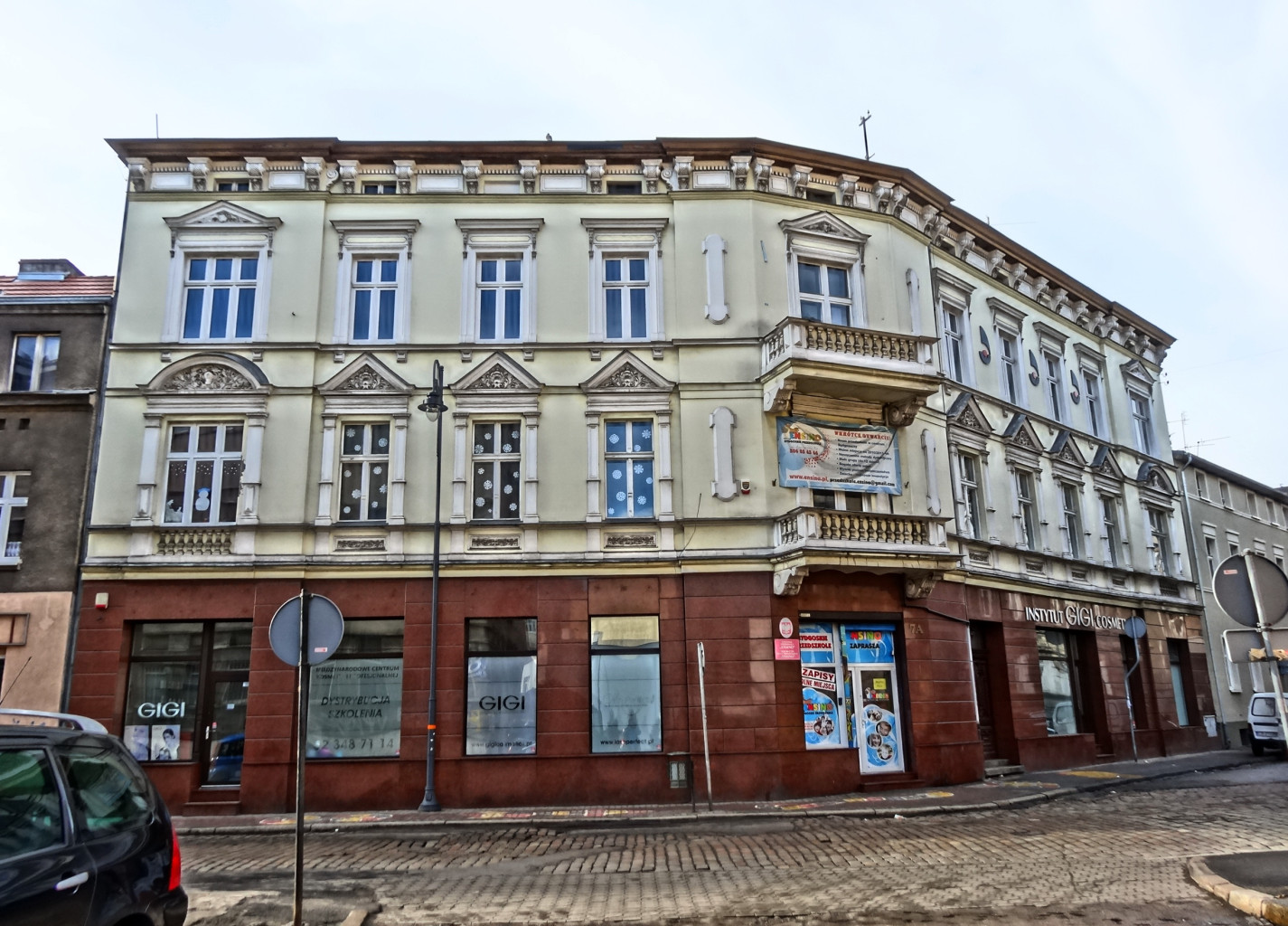
View from Pomorska street

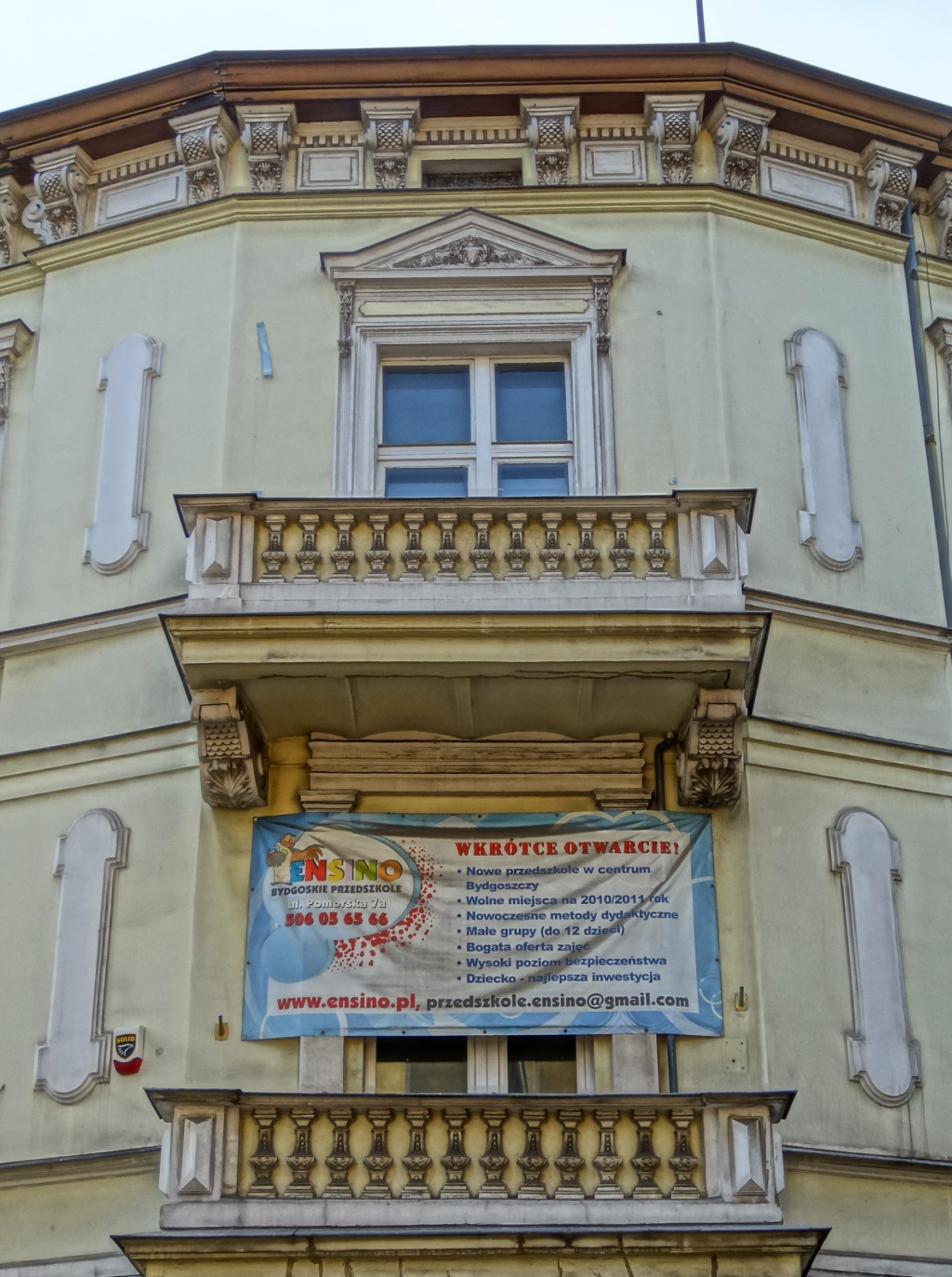
Detail of balconies

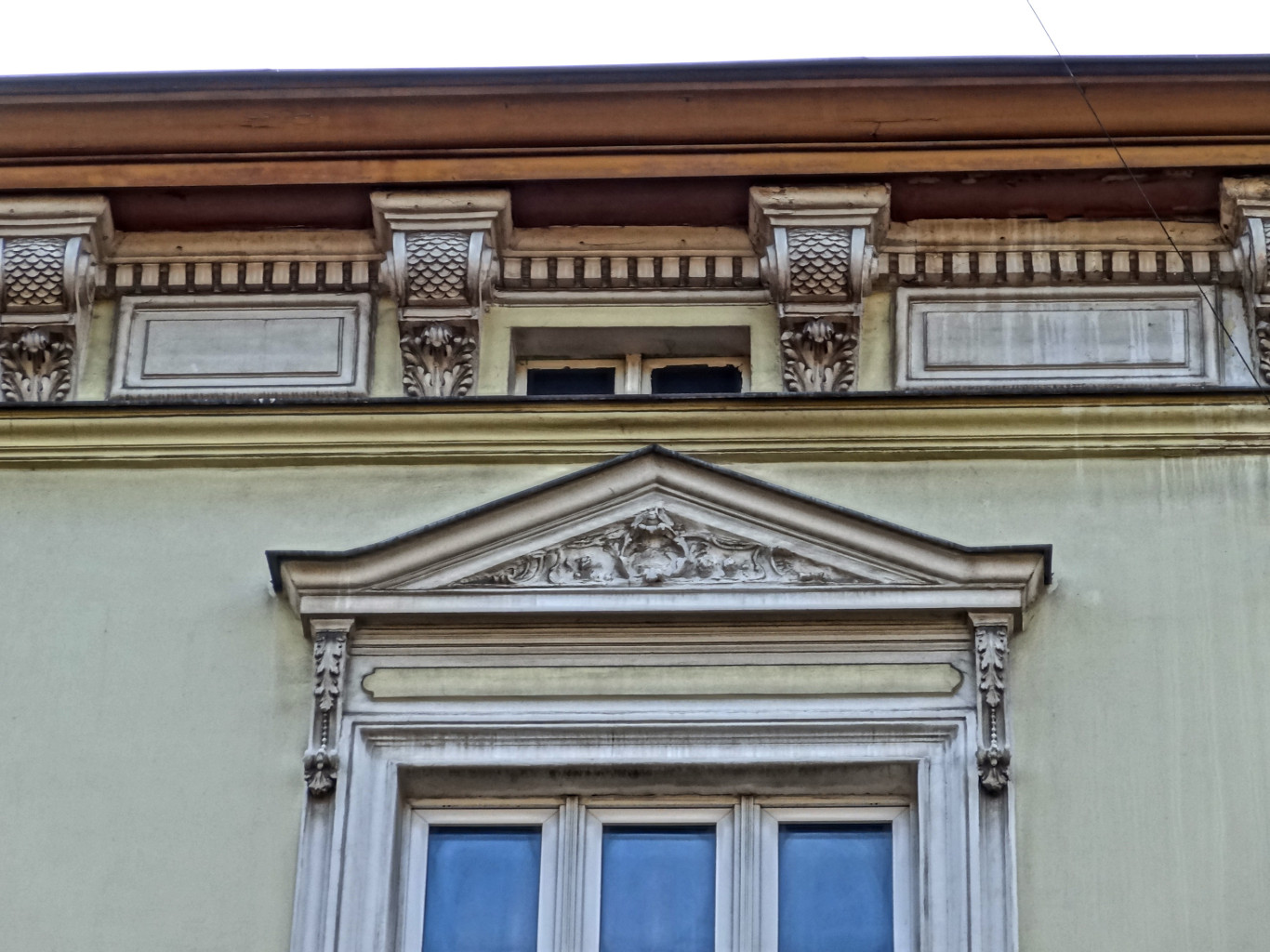
Pediment and corbels

=== Tenement at 11 ===
1911

Eclecticism-Art Nouveau

Apparently, the house (with ancient address "Rinkauerstraße 9") has been commissioned by Carl Kretschmer, a copper craftsman, specialized in building machines and pipes. In 1925, Mr. Jasiemicz, a master painter, lived there: the firm he worked for was established in 1835.

The facade displays typical features of Art Nouveau architecture: simplified motifs, wavy shapes, floral ornaments. This elevation echoes facades from architect Erich Lindenburger one can find on Dworcowa Street, at Nr.45 and 47 (both from 1906). A recent refurbishment of the house has given it back its colors and architectural details.

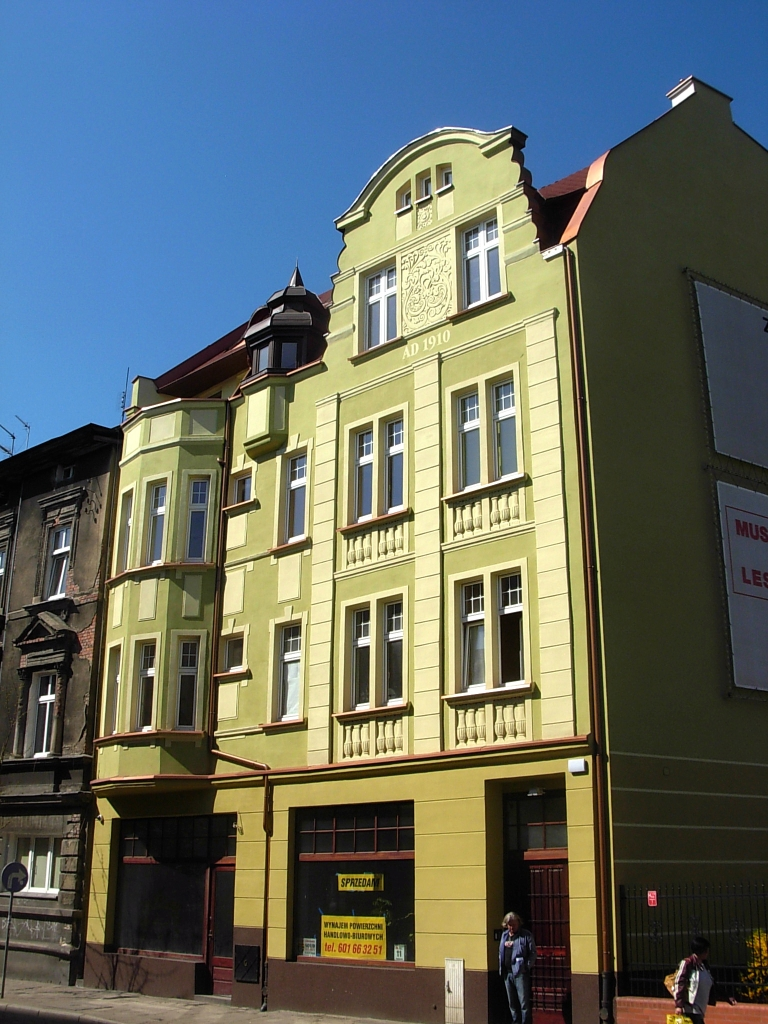
View from the street

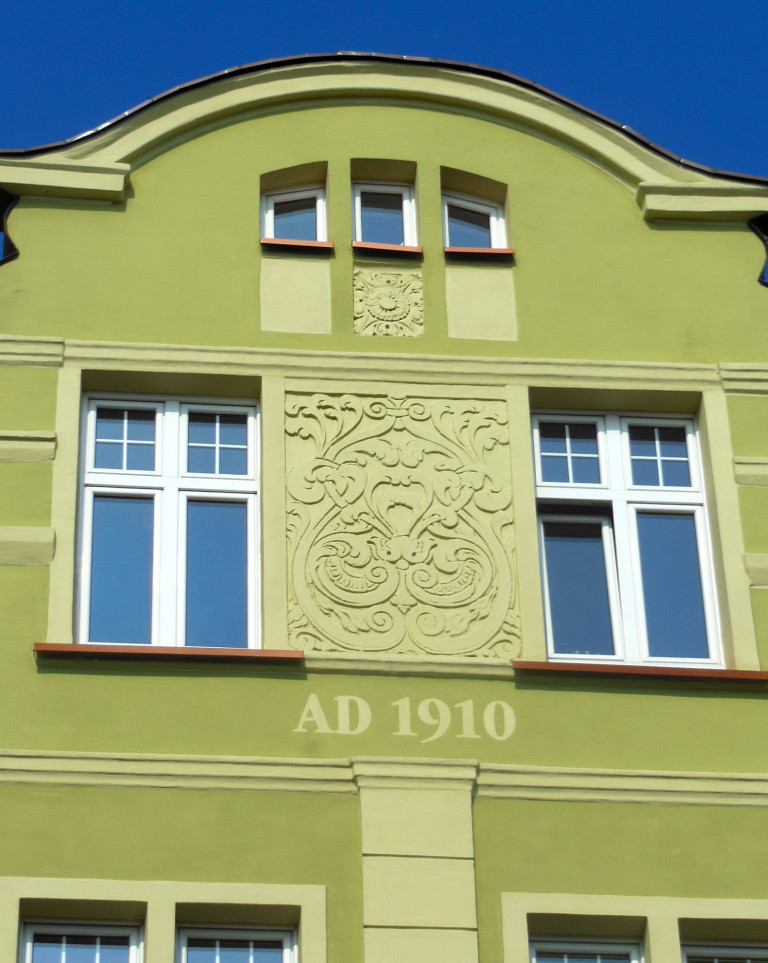
Detail of ornaments

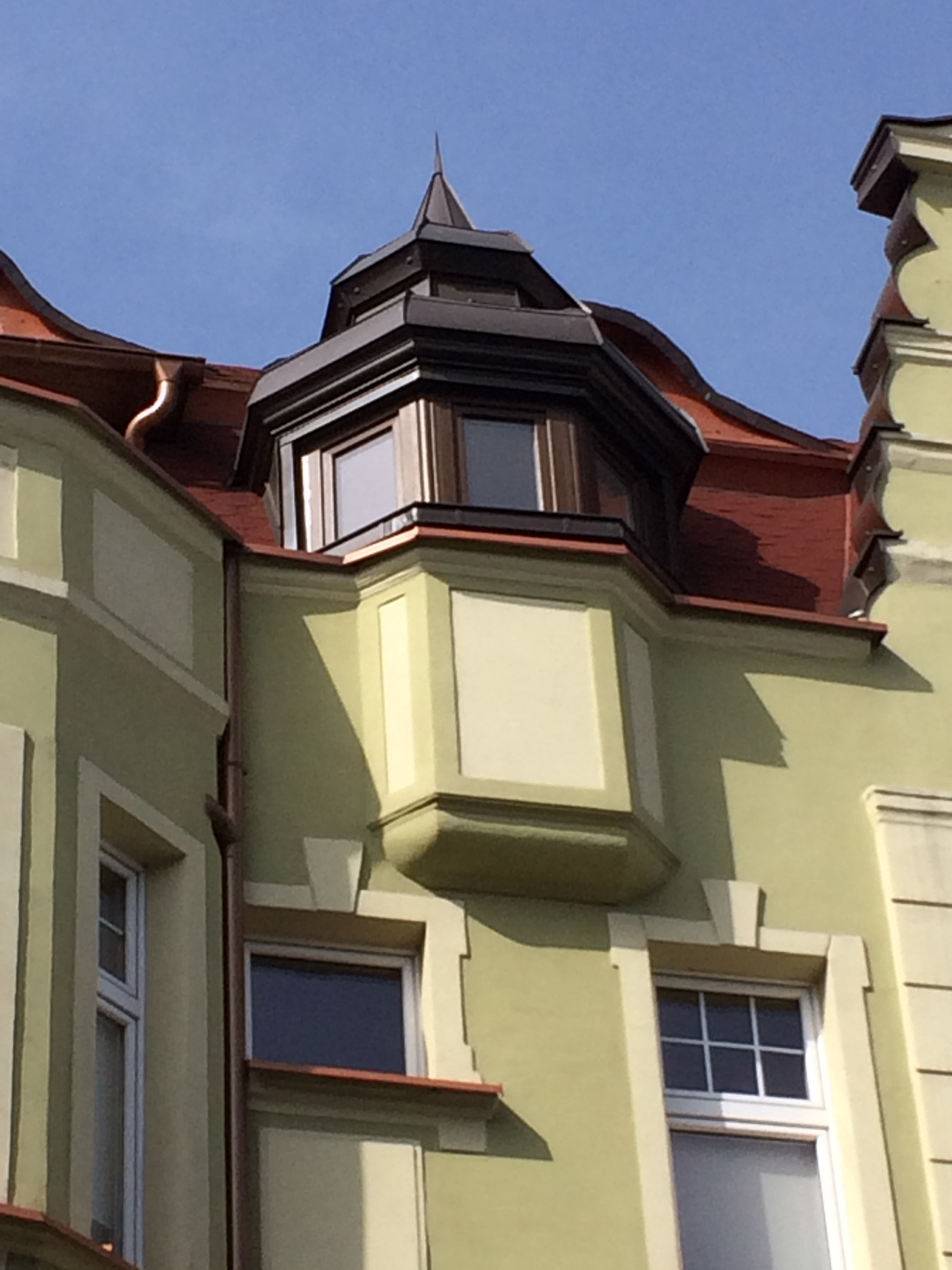
Tented roof

=== Tenement at 12 ===
1889–1890

Eclecticism

The first landlord of this building at then "Rinkauerstraße 60" was Julius Wernick: he lived there and owned as well the abutting building (at Nr.14).

The facade, renovated in 2017–2018, displays eclectic features. In particular, one can highlight the pedimented windows and the avant-corps flanking the entrance door.

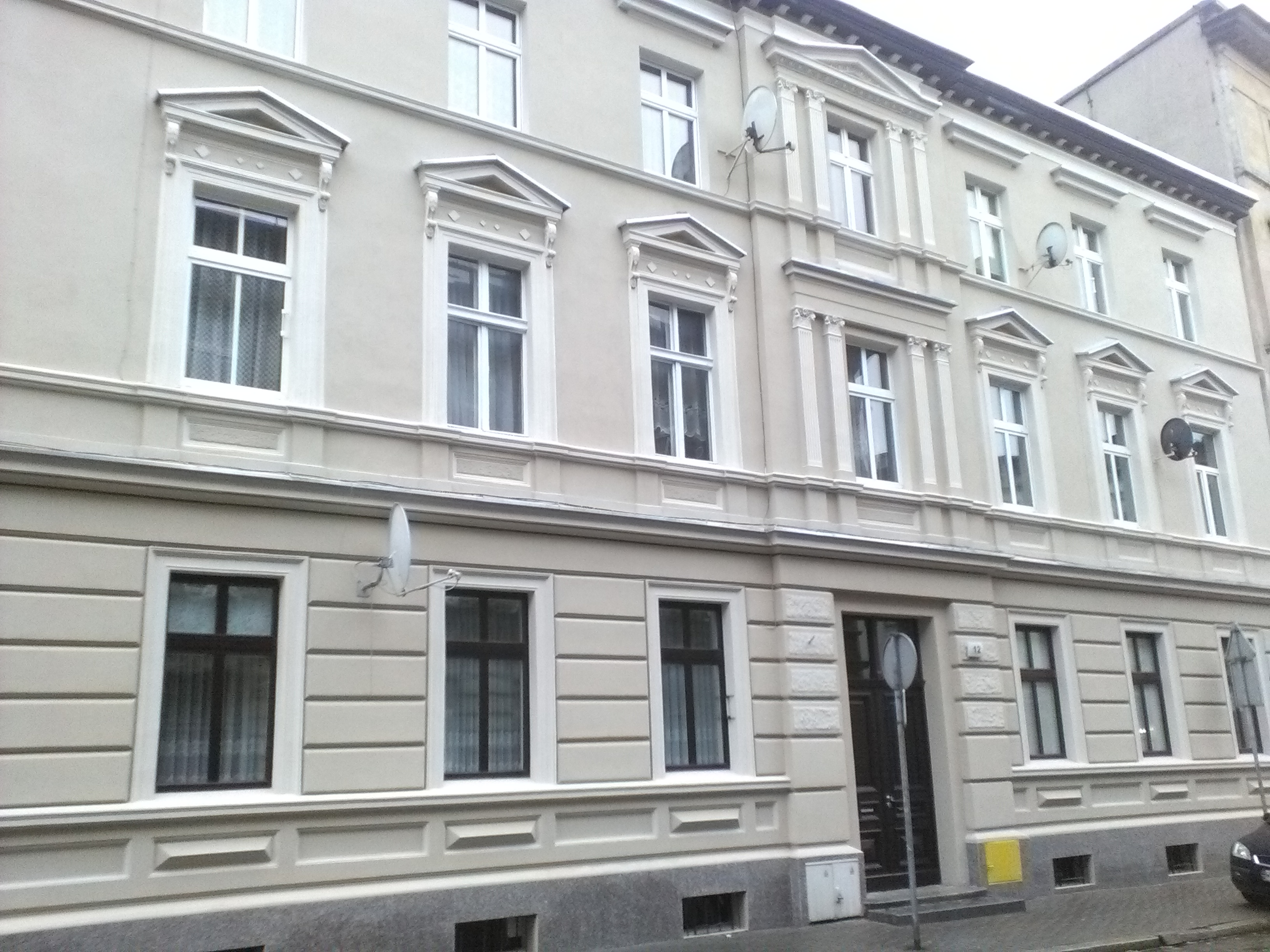
Facade from the street

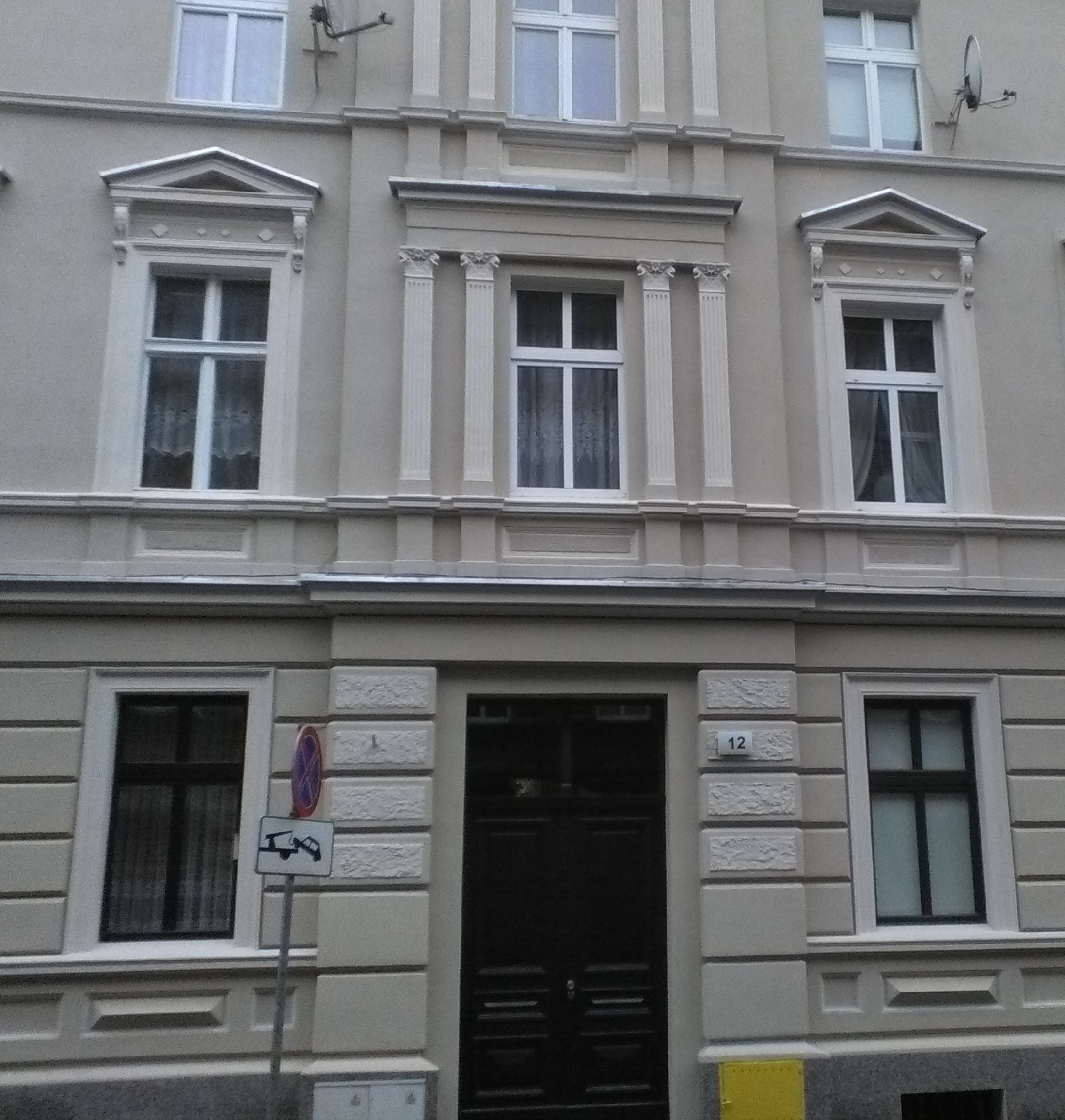
Entrance and avant-corps

=== Tenement at 14 ===
1899–1901

Eclecticism

Although the plot was built prior to the current building (e.g. owner Ludwig Posorski, a locksmith in 1885), the actual edifice had Julius Wernick for first landlord. He lived at Nr.12.

The facade displays many architectural details: - a gate flanked with pilasters with corbels; - 1st floor windows topped with curved pediments, adorned with vegetal motifs; - 2nd floor windows feature rectangular pediments, with ornaments. A series of corbels tops the elevation.

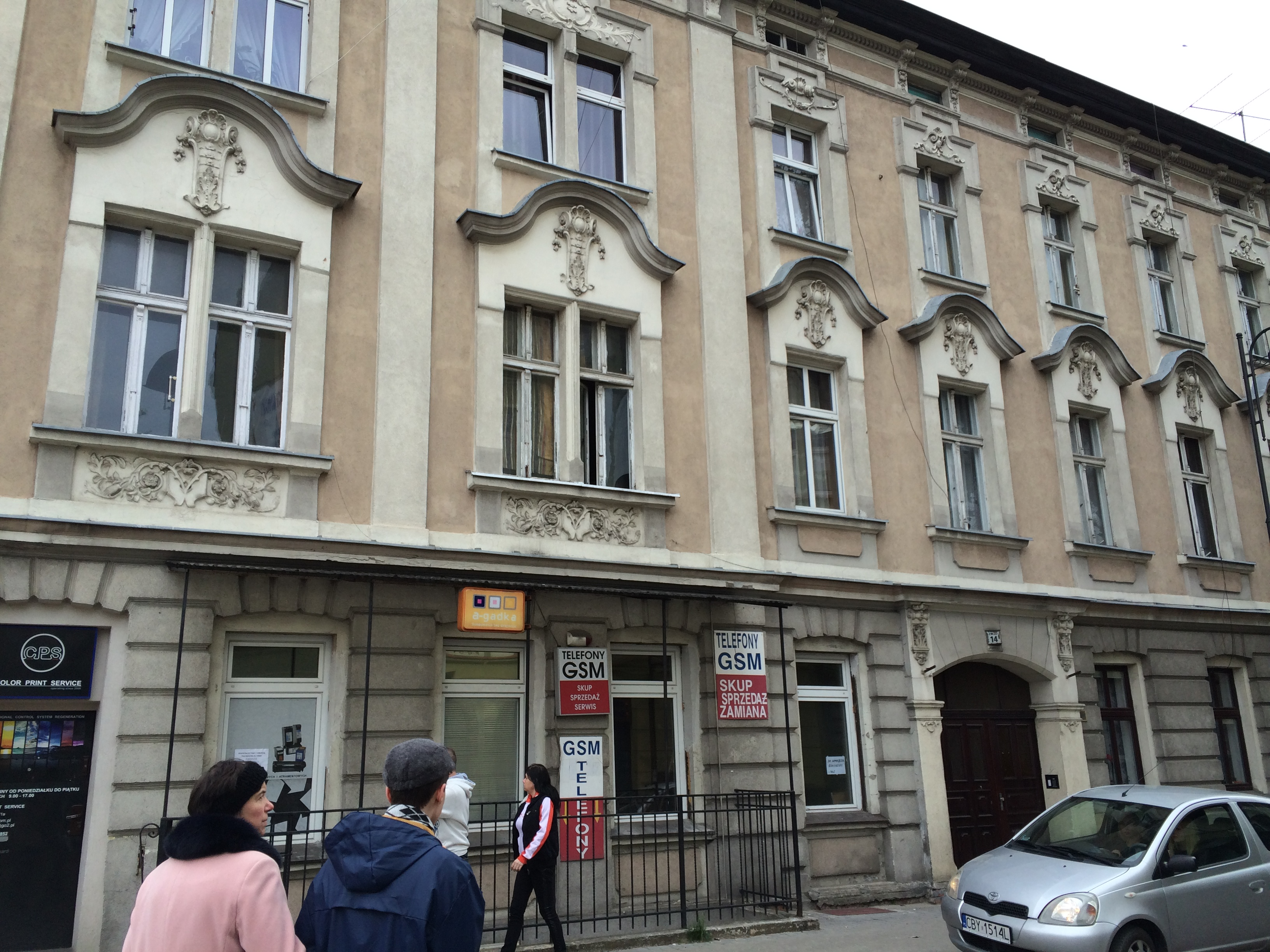
Facade

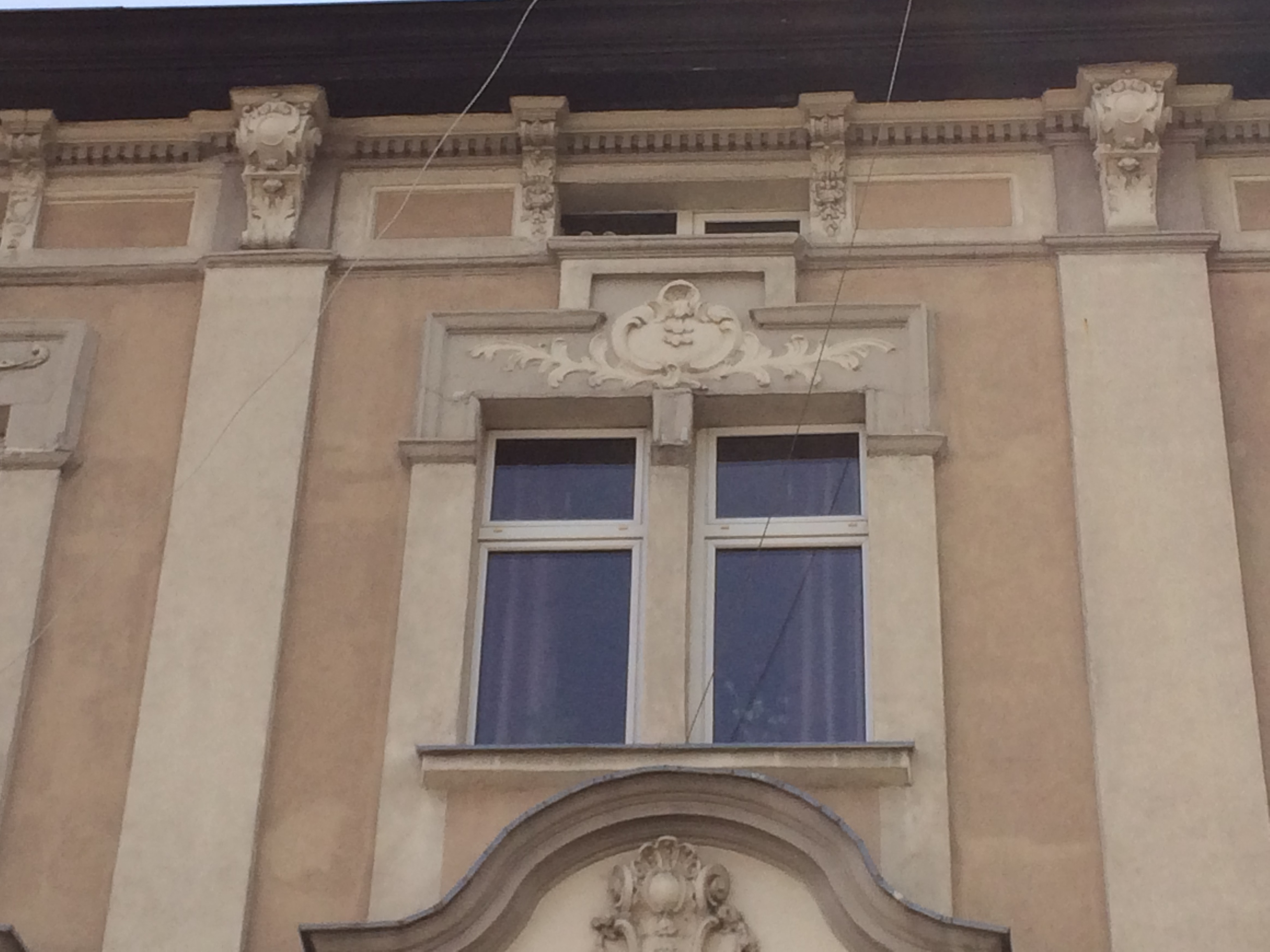
Window ornamentation

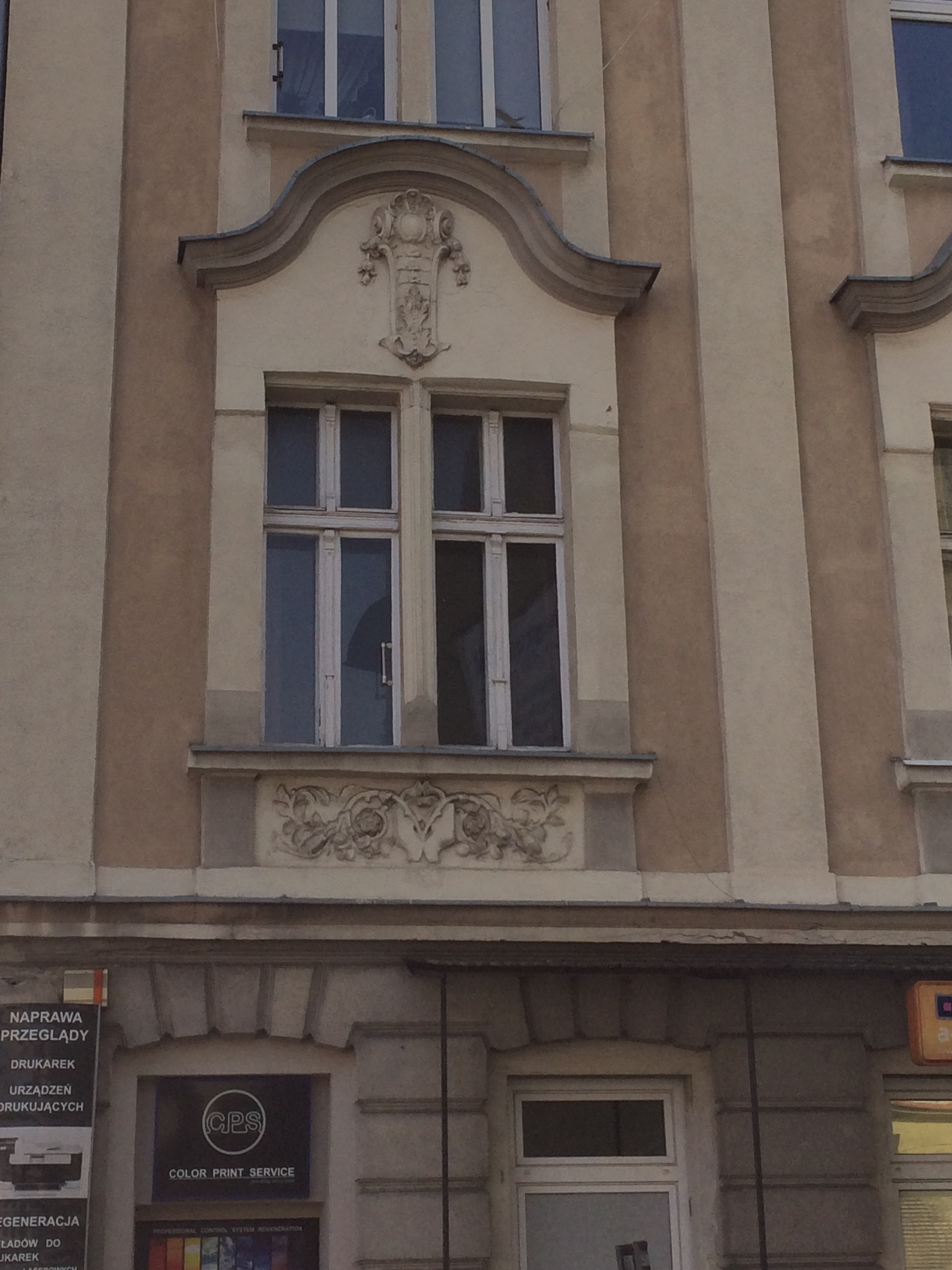
Window ornamentation

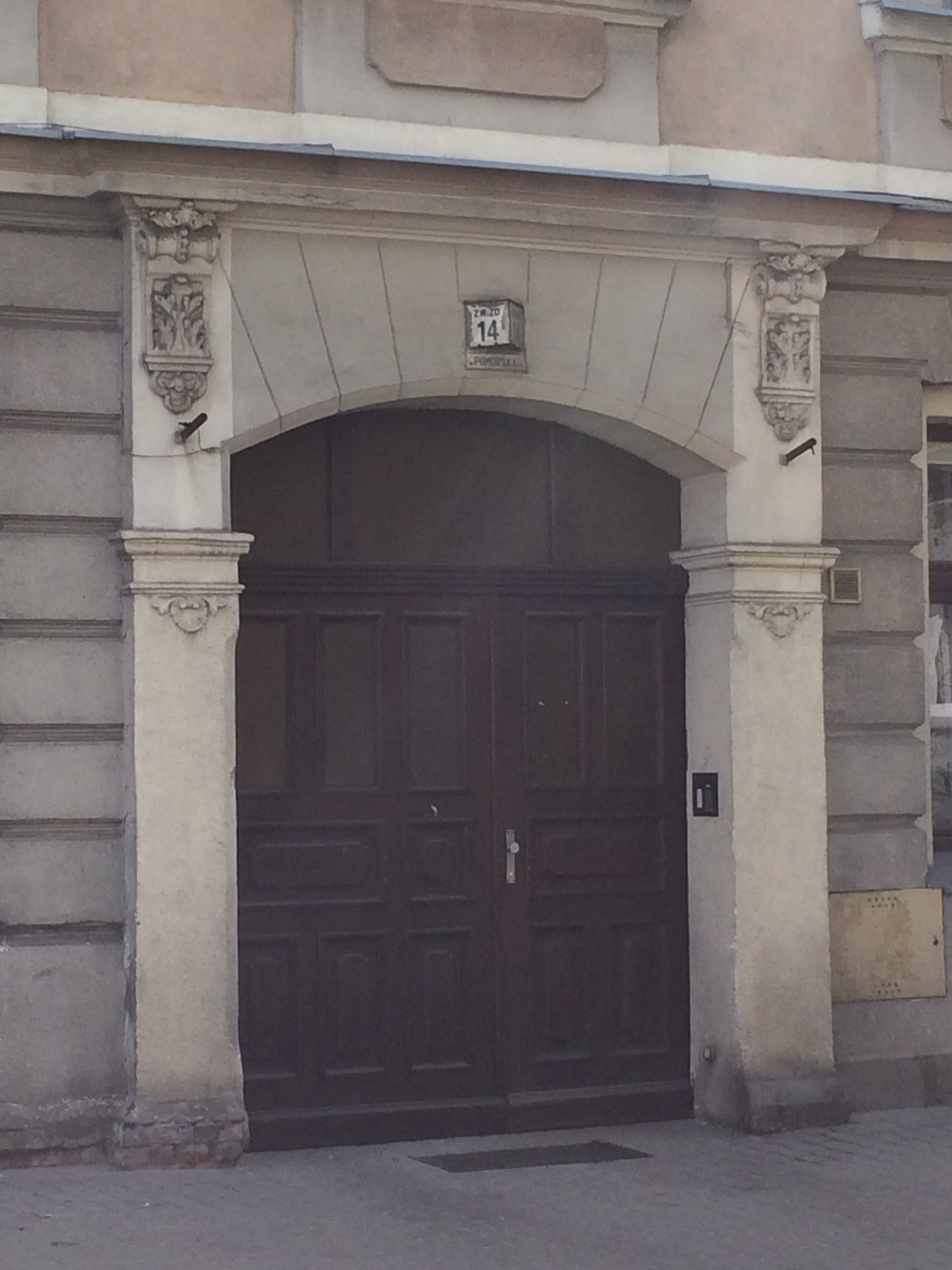
Main Gate

=== Fire Station building, at 16/18 ===
Registered on Kuyavian-Pomeranian Voivodeship heritage list, Nr.601395, Reg.A/860/1-2, November 24, 1994

1909

Eclecticism-Art Nouveau

The facade displays typical features of Art Nouveau architecture: simplified motifs, wavy shapes, floral ornaments. This elevation echoes facades from architect Erich Lindenburger one can find on Dworcowa Street, at Nr.45 and 47 (both from 1906).

A refurbishment of the building in 2015 has given it back its colors and architectural details.

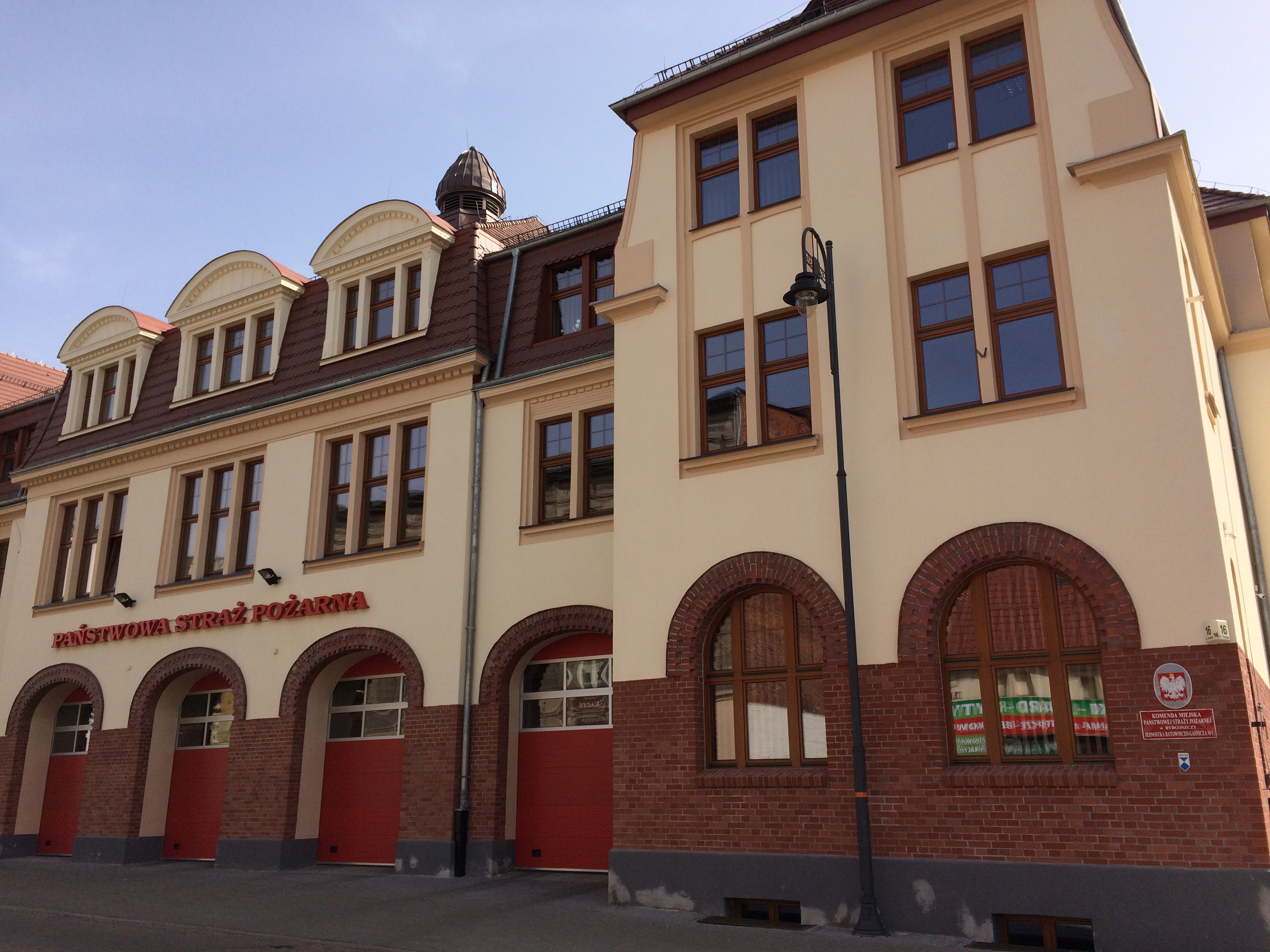
Nr.16 view from the street

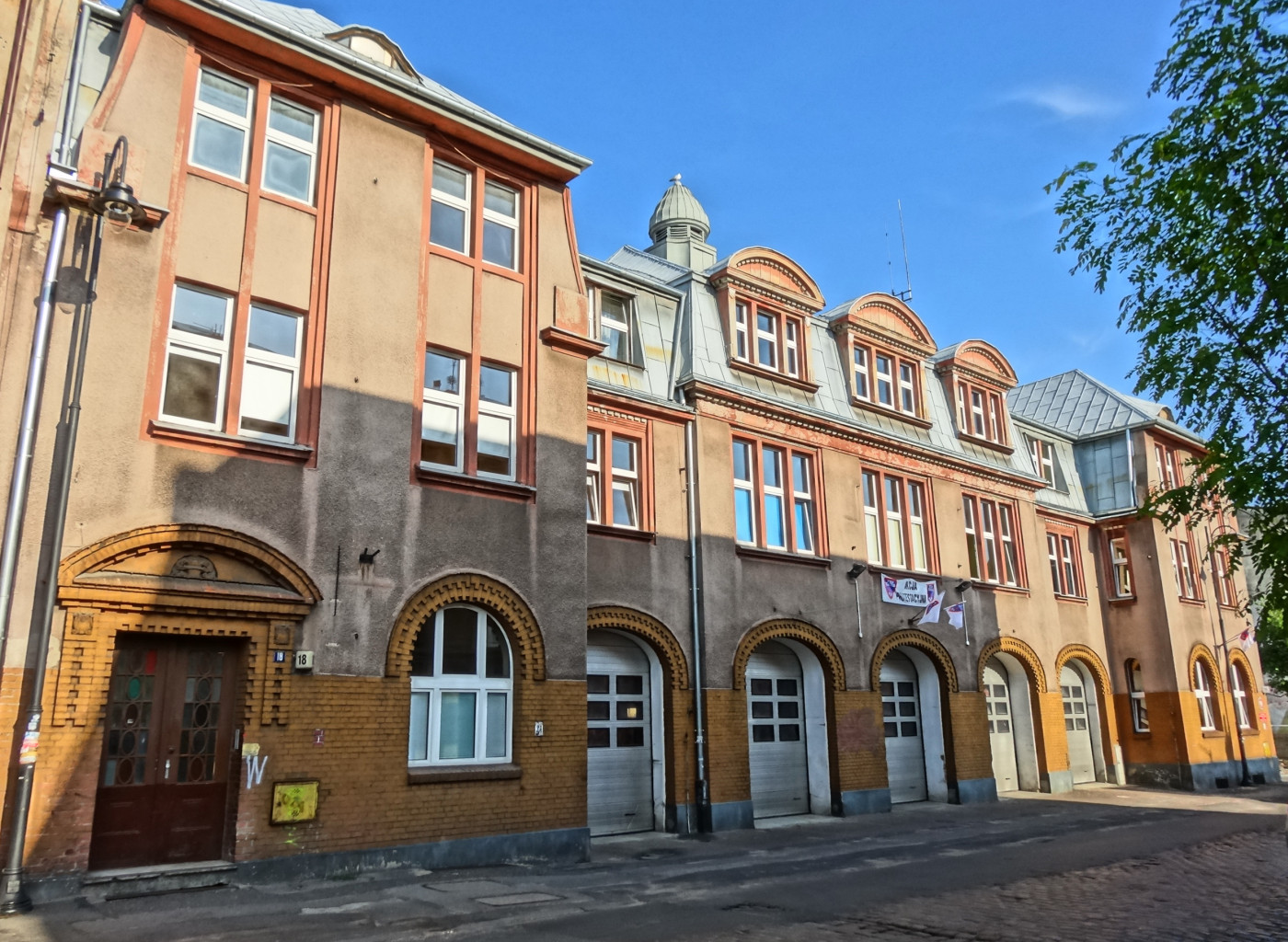
General view of the facade

=== Tenement at 17 ===
1880s

Eclecticism, Neo-renaissance

The tenement at then "Rinkauerstraße 11" was first the property of Eduard Tapper, a rentier. In the interwar years, it was the address of a painting firm "Jasiewicz i Syn" (Jasiewicz & son), run by Martin Jaciewicz. Their neighbor was Friedrich Steinborn, a tailor.

The building, though in bad shape, keeps some remnants of its initial architectural cachet: symmetry of the facade, recurrent motifs such as vegetal garlands and pediments on first level windows and slight avant-corps to underline the frontage.

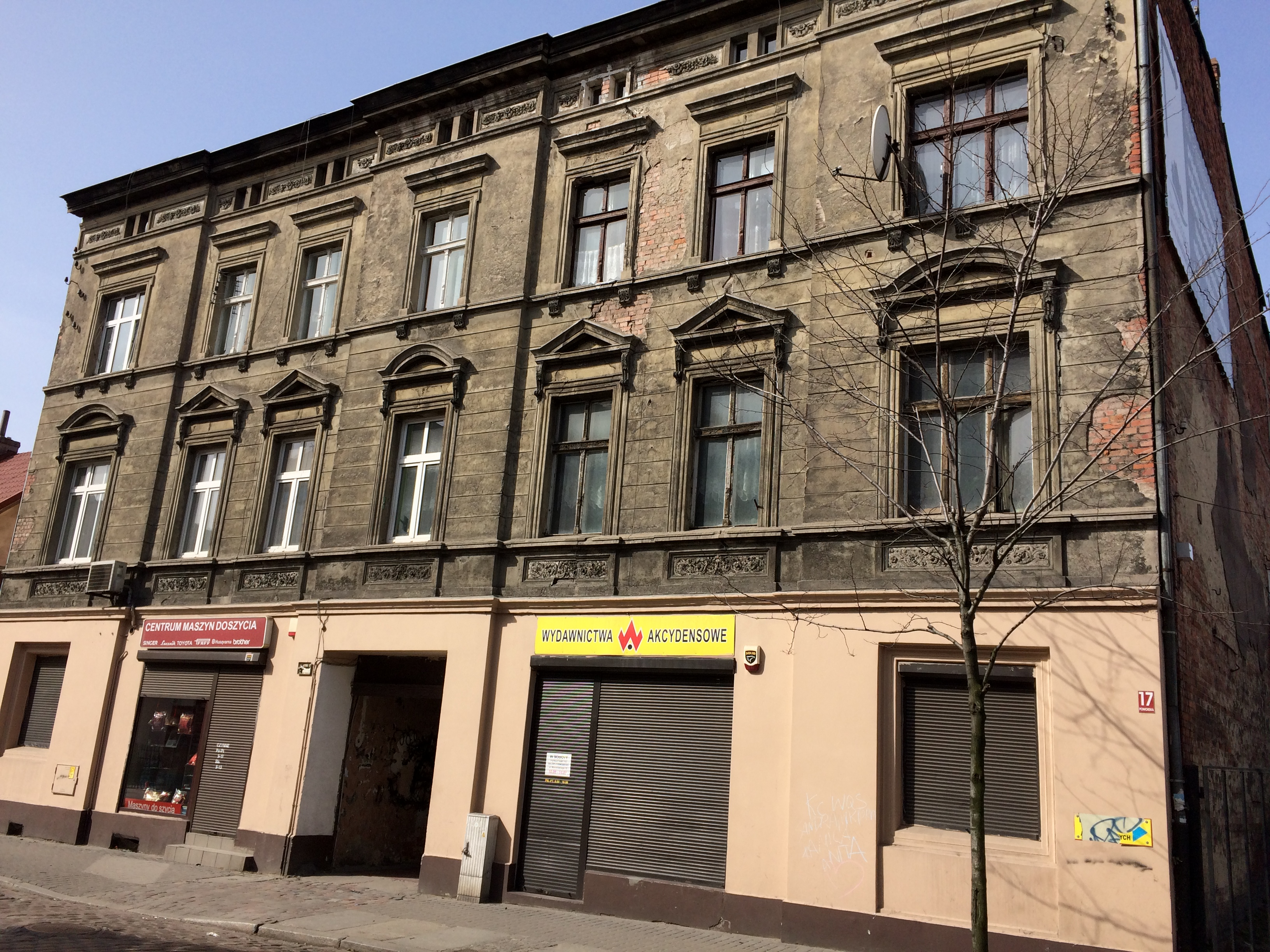
Main elevation on the street

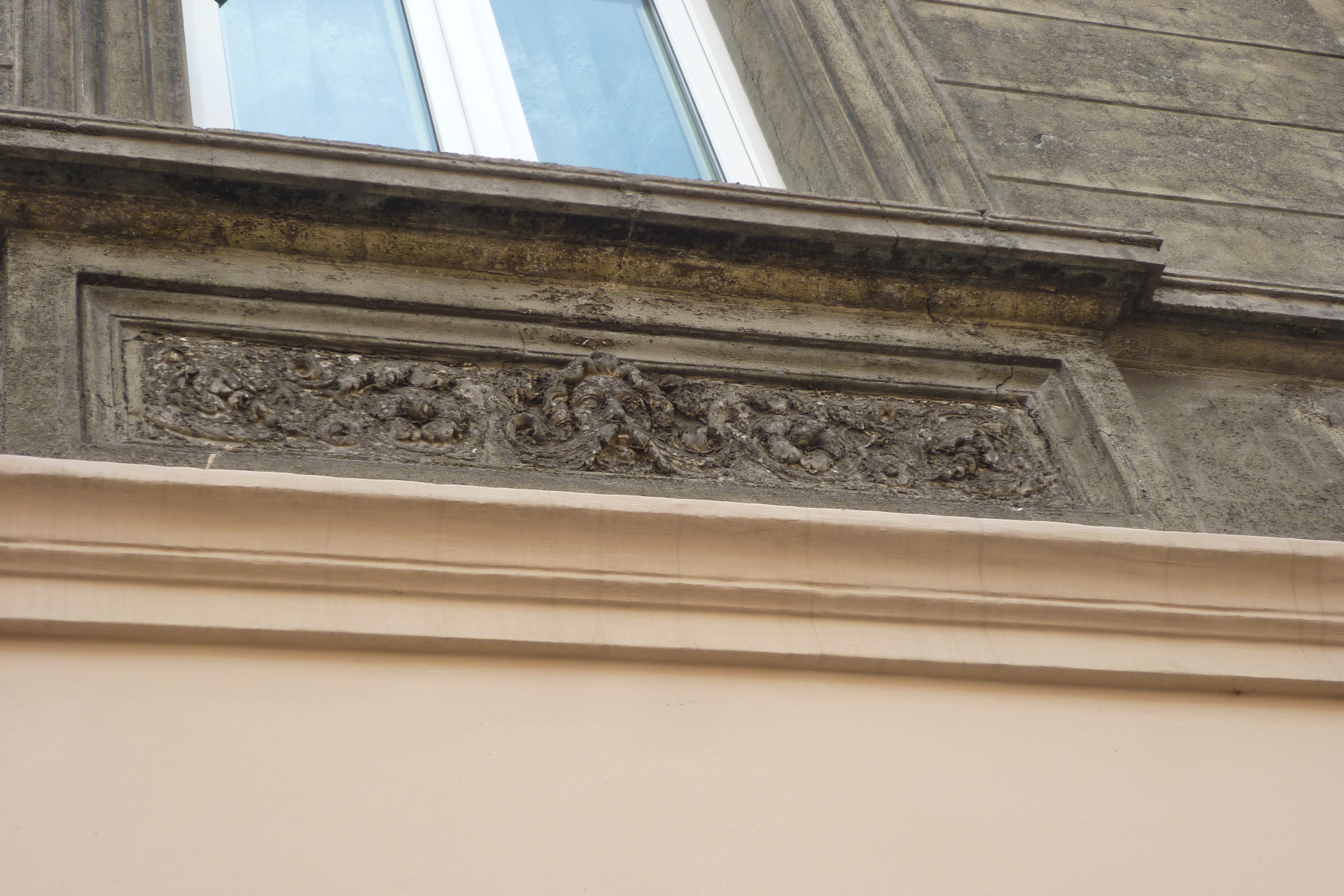
Motifs detail

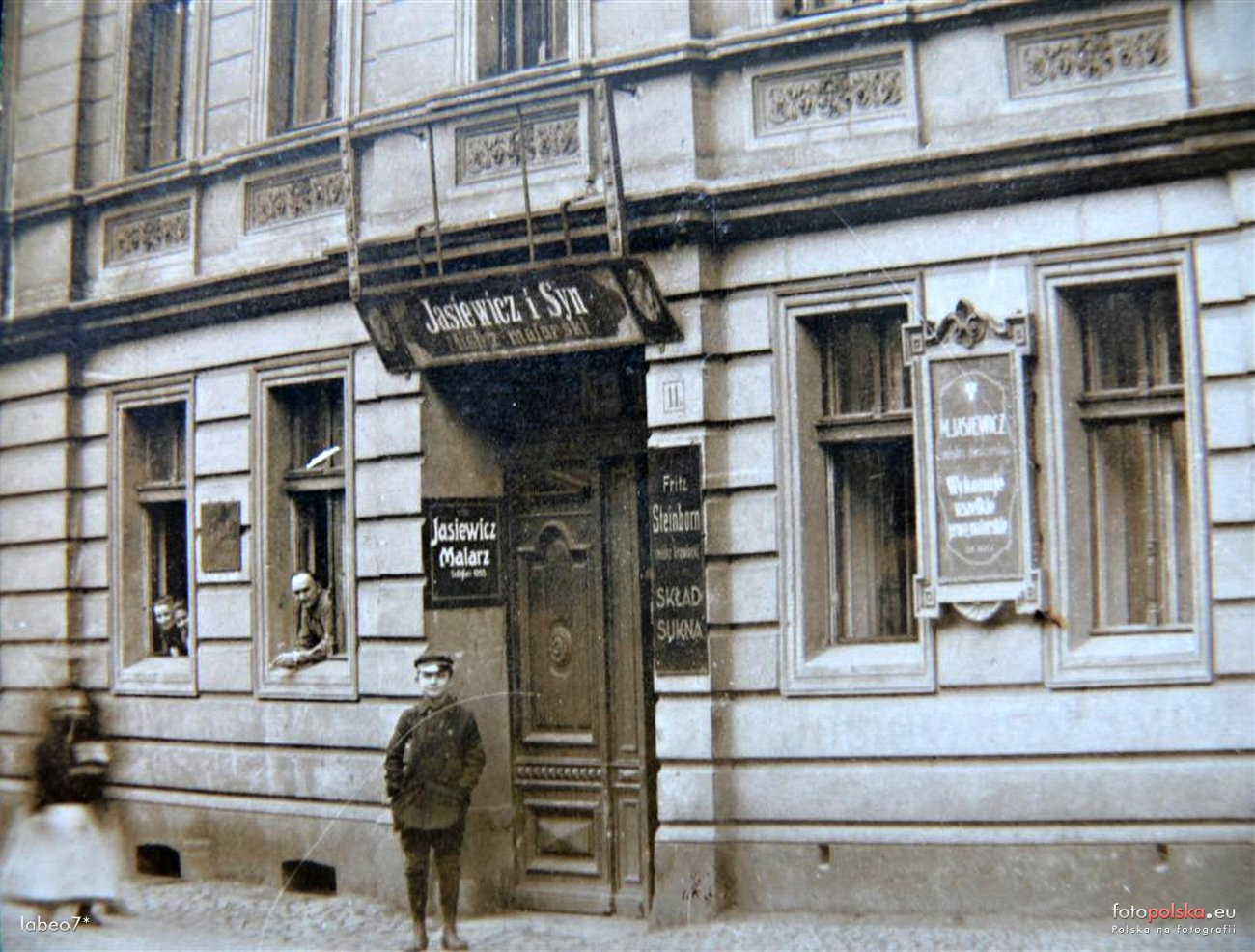
Picture ca 1920, with firm "Jasiewicz i Syn" board

=== Tenement at 19 ===
20th century

The present house, somehow ordinary, is located on a plot where has been standing a cabaret in the 1920s (Bi-Ba-Bo) and the 1930s (Oaza). At that time, the numbering of the street was still echoing the old Prussian one, even though street names changed (from "Rinkauerstraße" to "Pomorska street"): hence the address of the cabaret at Nr.12, now Nr.19.

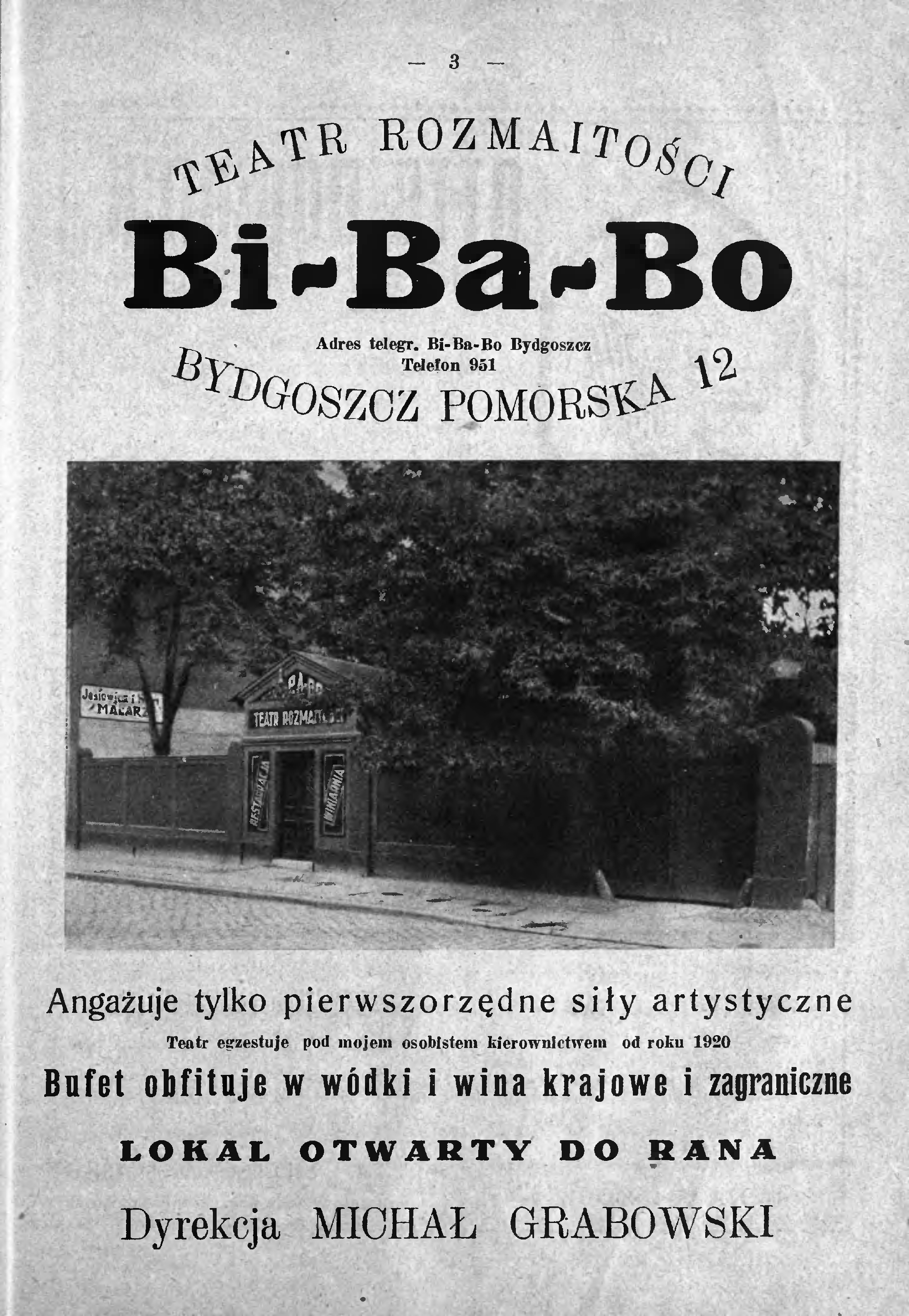
Advertising for "Bi-Ba-Bo" Cabaret in 1926

=== Corner house with Śniadeckich Street ===
1893

Eclecticism-Neo-Renaissance

August Freitwald, a master shoemaker, owned this building which address was then Elisabethstraße 51 until 1910.

The architecture reflects main features of end of 19th century Eclecticism, so present in the streets of Bydgoszcz (e.g. Dworcowa Street, Gdańska Street). One can notice a lot of motifs adorning windows, those on the first floor are topped with triangular pediments containing angel faces. Corbels are present on the second floor and at the top of the facade, supporting the roof.

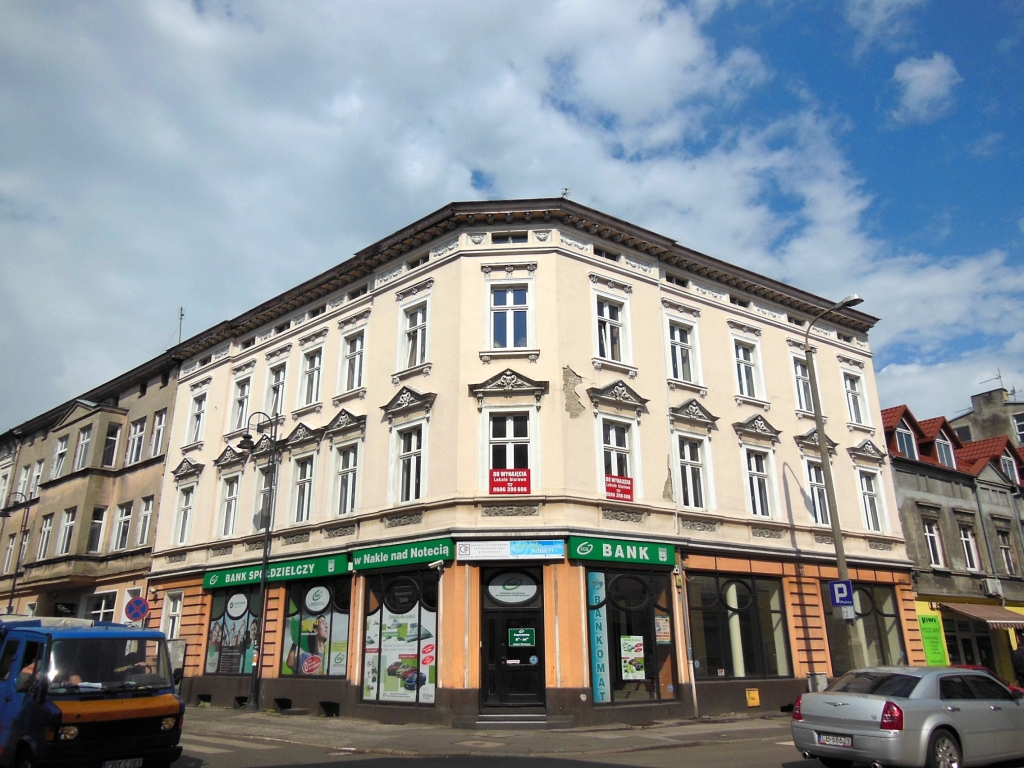
Main facades

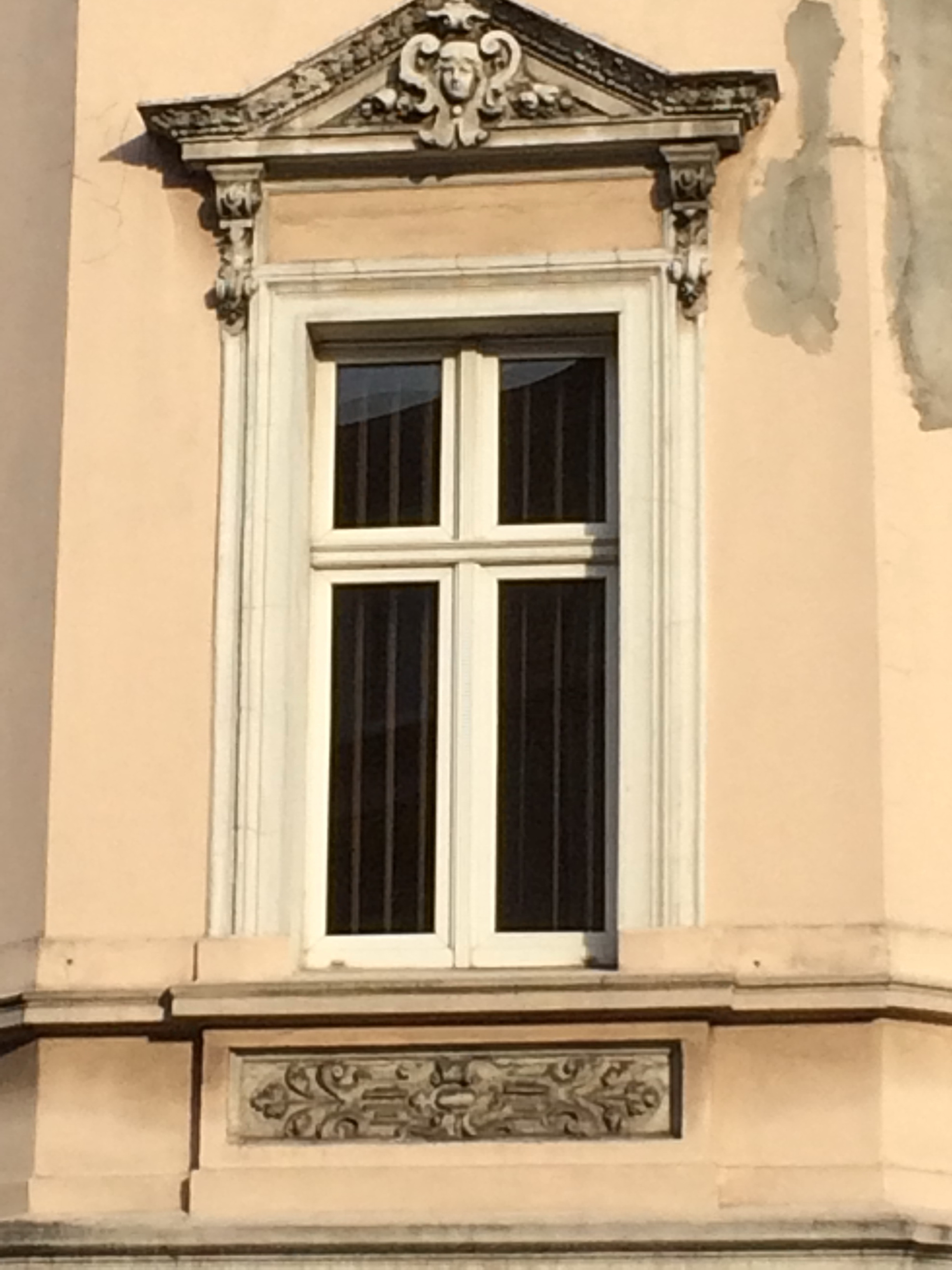
Detail of cartouche and pediment

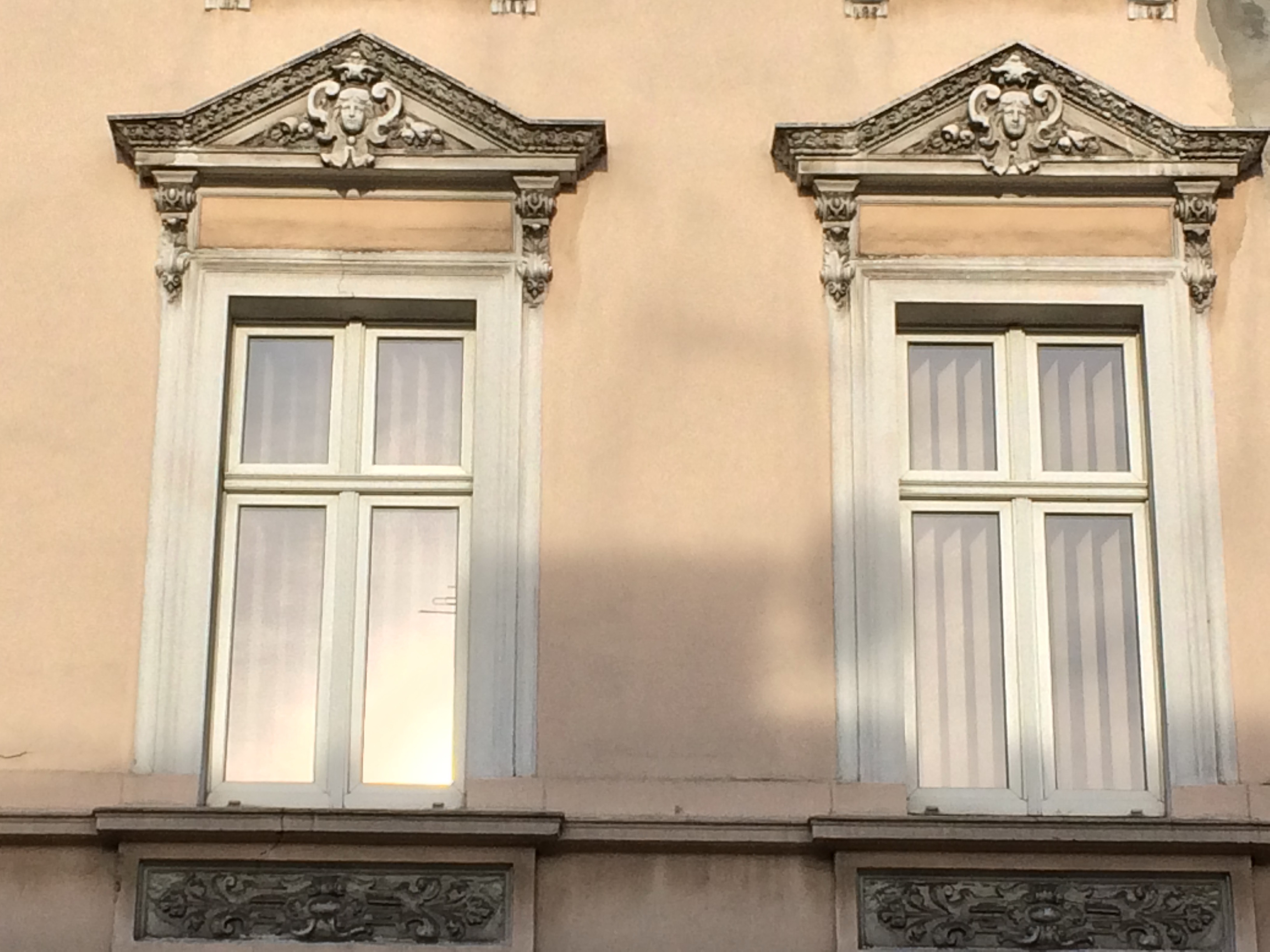
Facade details

=== Corner house with Śniadeckich Street ===
1891

Eclecticism & Neo-Renaissance

August Freitwald, a master shoemaker owned this building which address was then Elisabethstraße 49a.

The architecture of Nr.20 mirrors somehow one of the tenements across the street at Nr.18: main differences are located on the corner with a grand pediment crowning the top and a large bay window-balcony over the main entry. The topping pediment has a globe with the house completion date.

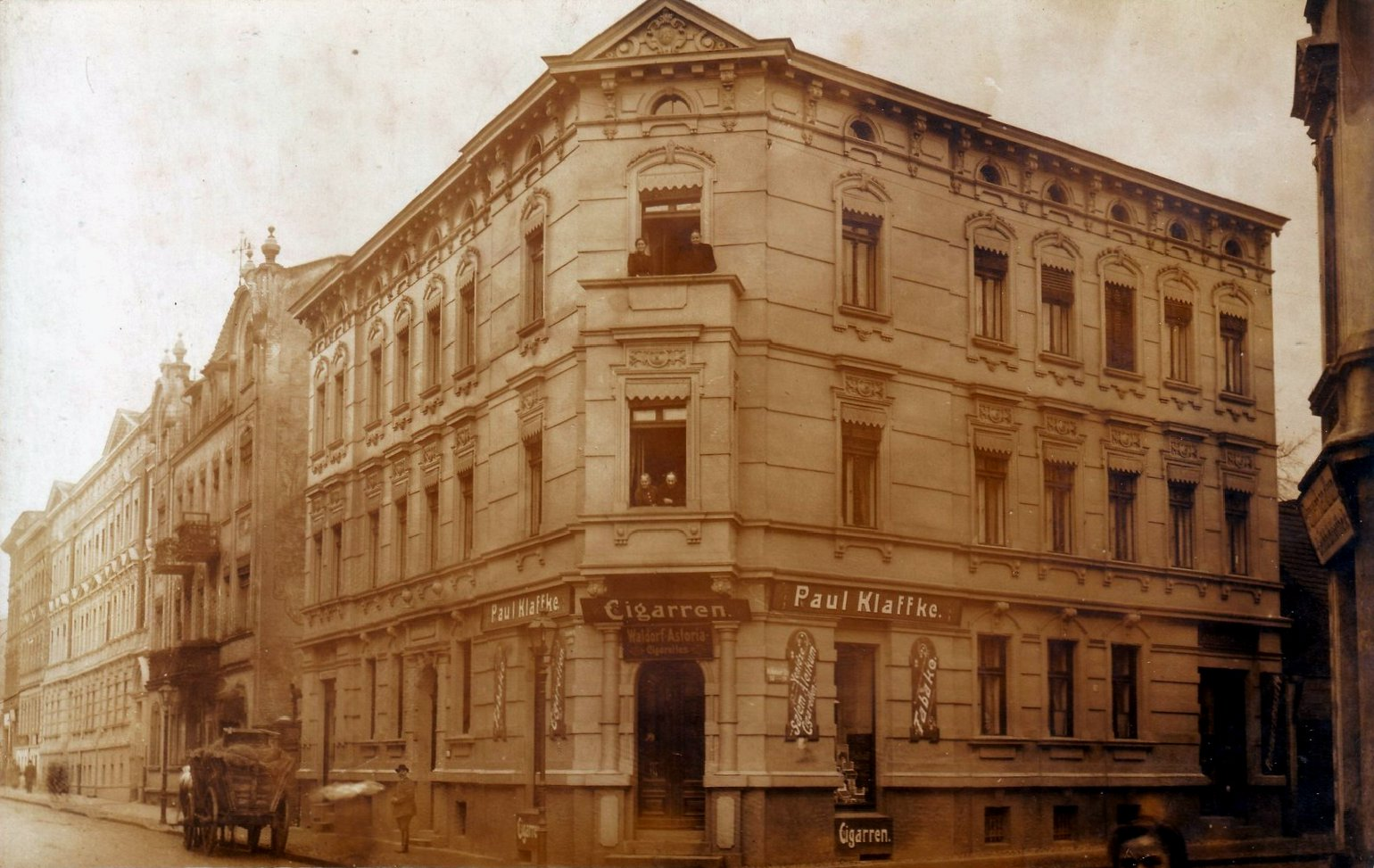
Tenement in 1910

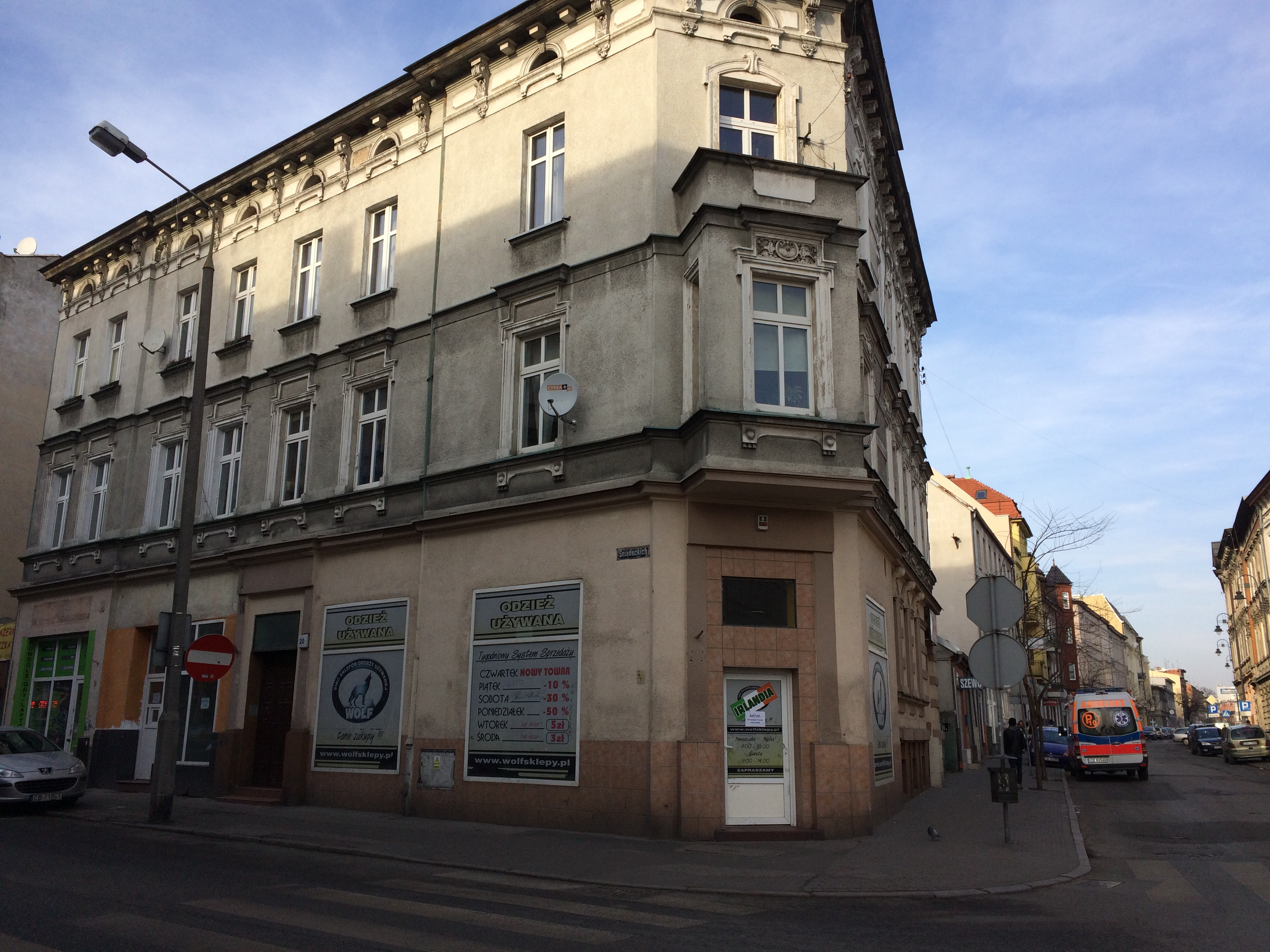
View from street intersection

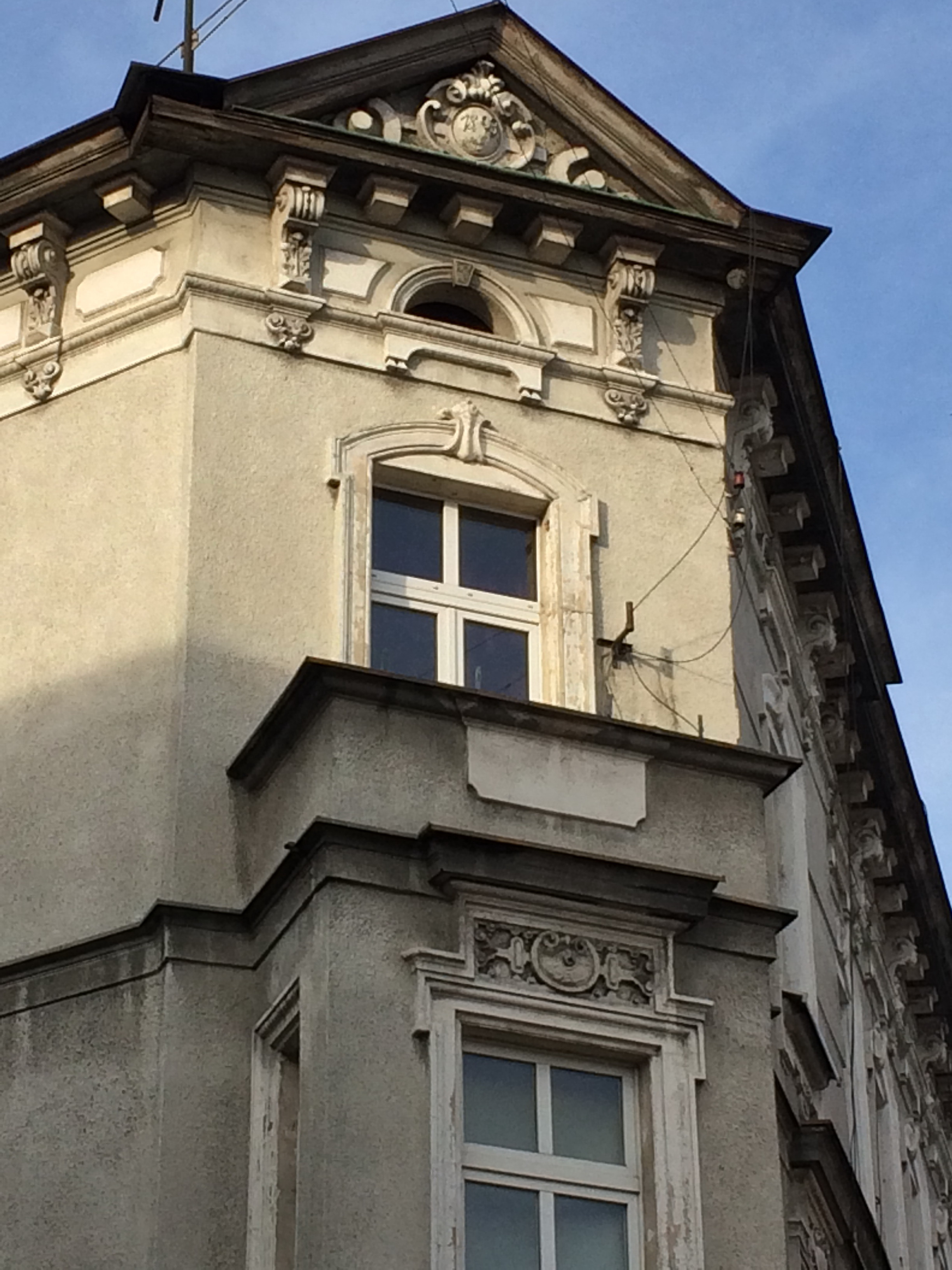
Detail of the corner bay window and its ornaments

=== Tenement at 24 ===
1904–1905

Historicism & forms of Northern Mannerism

Gustav ßibbe, a butcher, has been the first owner in 1880 of the house standing on this plot (Rinkauerstraße 59). However, the style suggests a rebuilding happened end of the 19th century. In the 1915, a restaurant run by Richard Franke moved there.

The facade as we know it, is very close to the one designed by Józef Święcicki in Albert Voigt tenement, at 38 Śniadeckich Street which dates back to 1893. The elevation is remarkable by its care of symmetry:

- On the first level, windows alternate triangular and arched pediments, with recurrent scrollworks in cartouche beneath;
- The second floor ornamentation is more simple, with decorative motifs topping the windows;
- A corbel table crowns the facade.
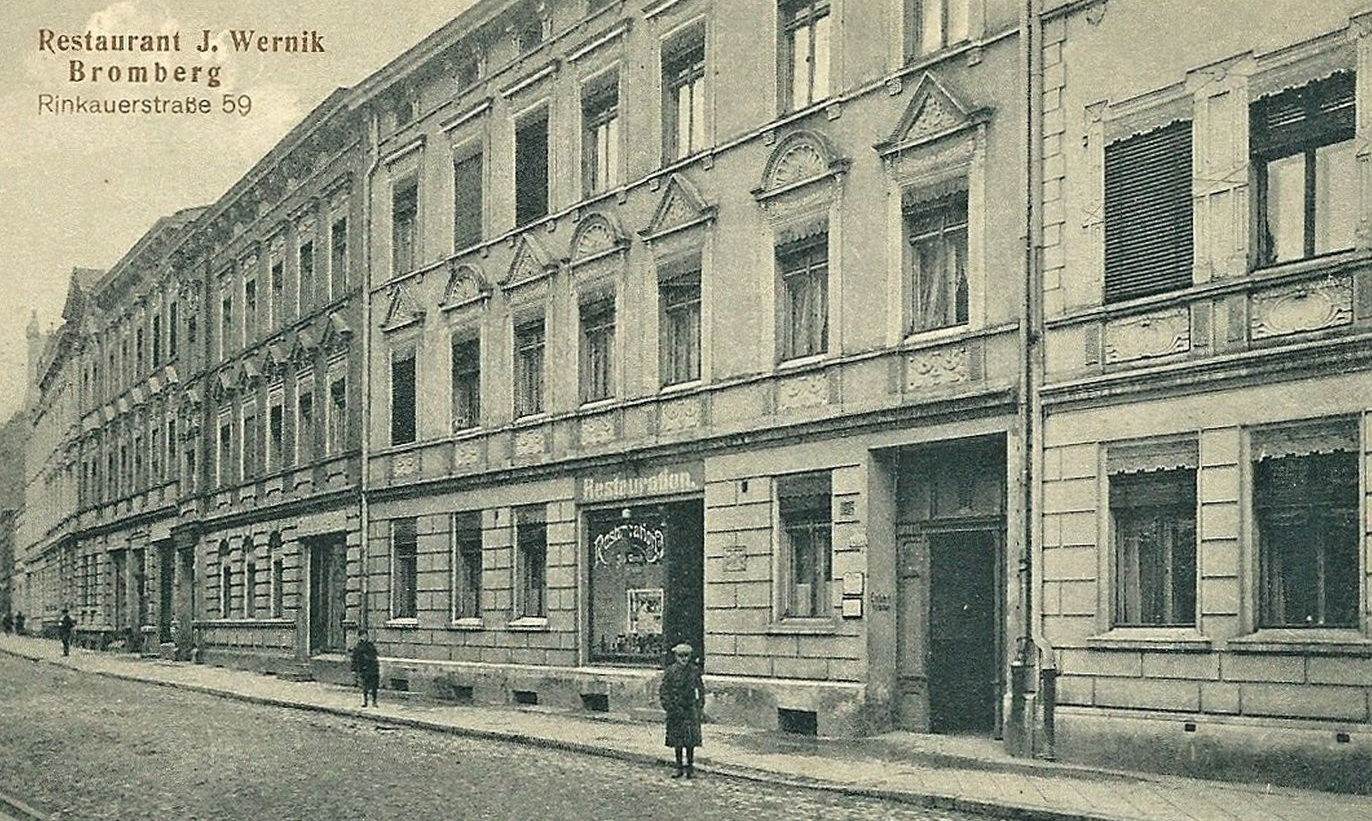
View of the tenement in 1915

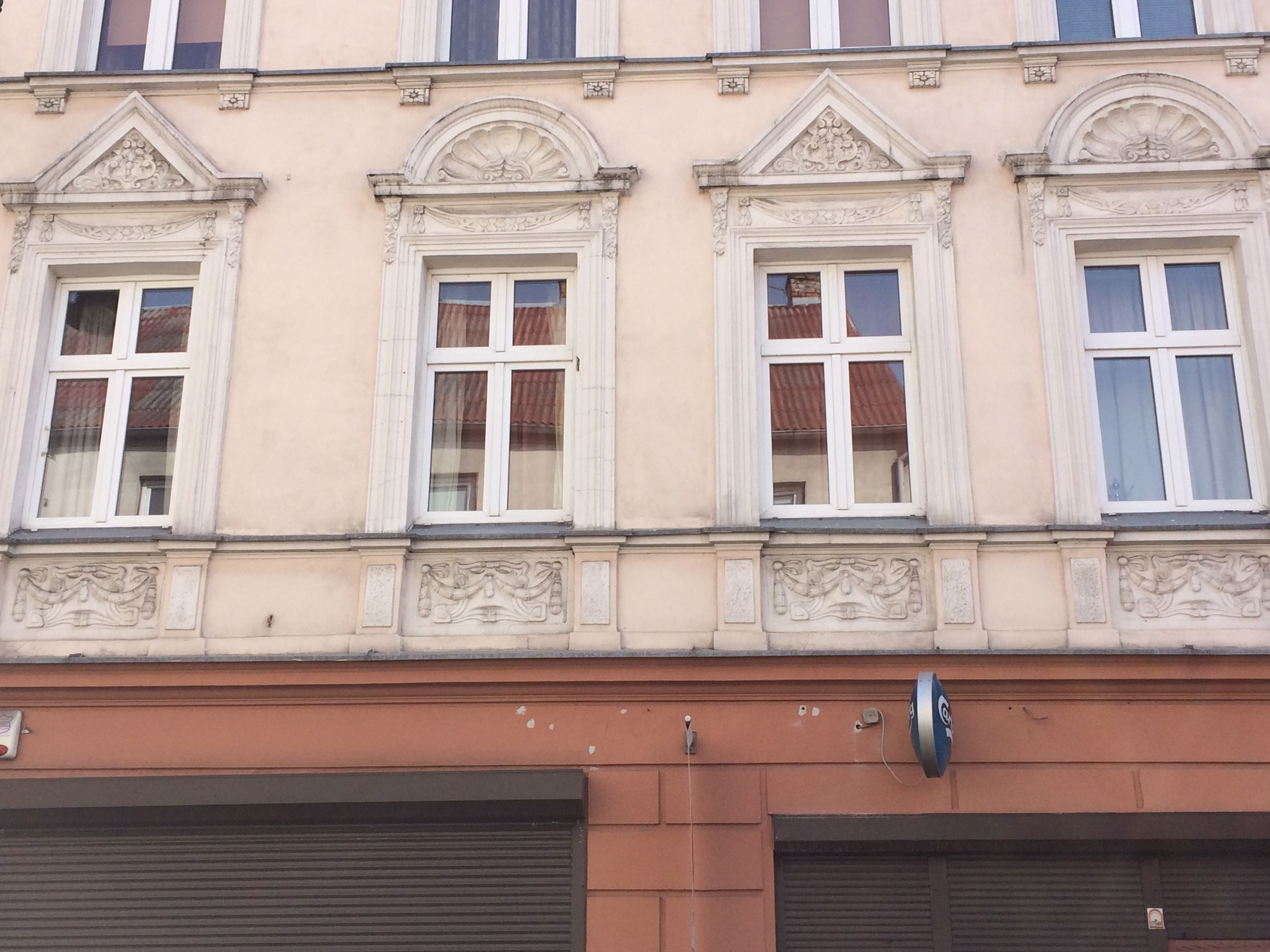
Facade decoration

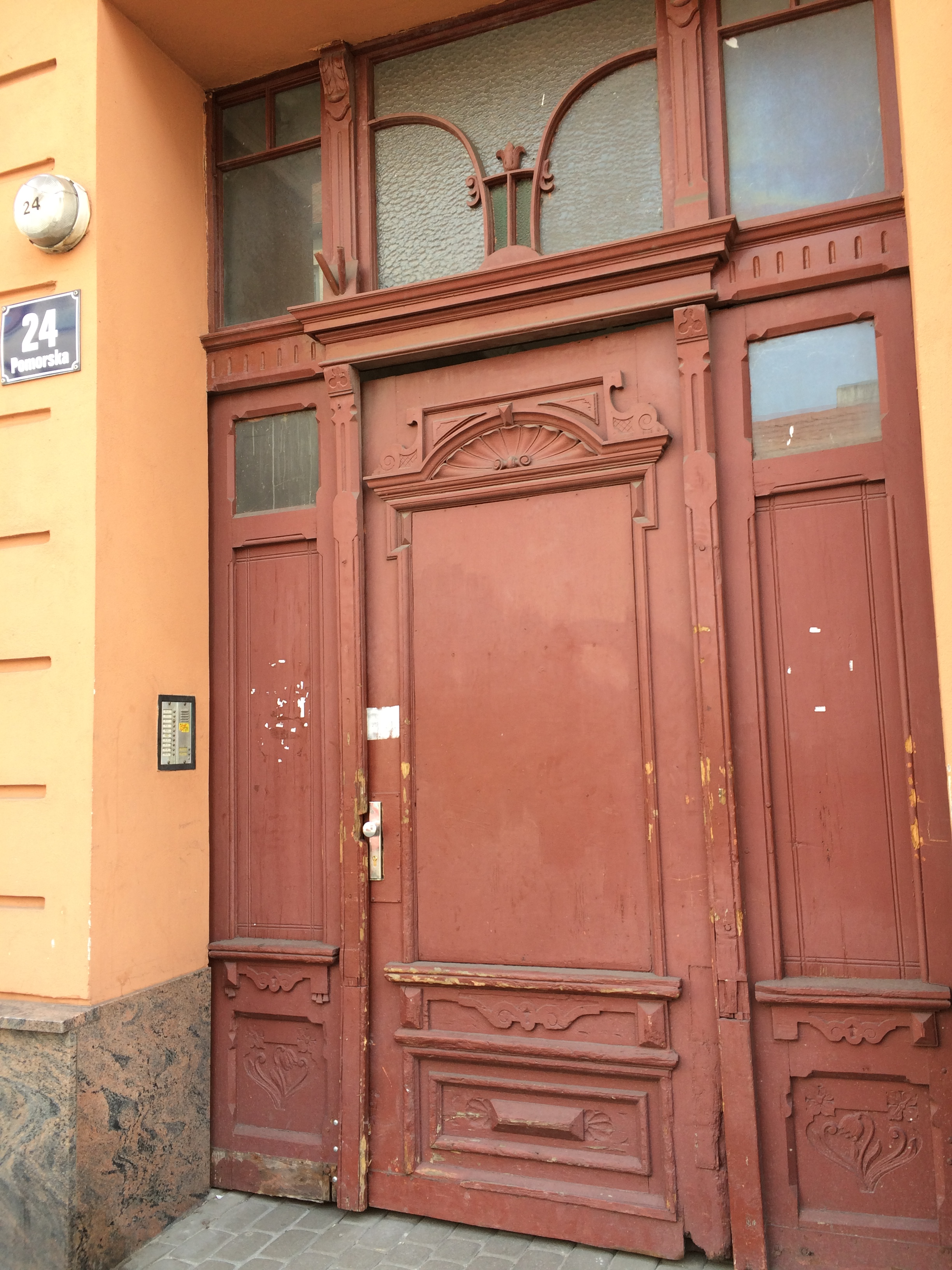
Adorned gate

=== Tenement at 26 ===
1895–1897

Historicism, Eclecticism

Anton Opiß, a tax collector, has commissioned the construction of the tenement at then Rinkauerstraße 58 in the early 1880s, and moved there in 1886. It then was the workshop in the 1900s of a locksmith, Albert Pohl. After 1920, on the ground floor was located the workshop of Piotr Malinowski, a tailor: his name is still visible above the current shop showcase.

Nice elevation, underlined by bossage and arched windows on the ground floor. Pediments topping first level windows are adorned with delicate vegetal ornaments. The tenement was renovated in 2022.

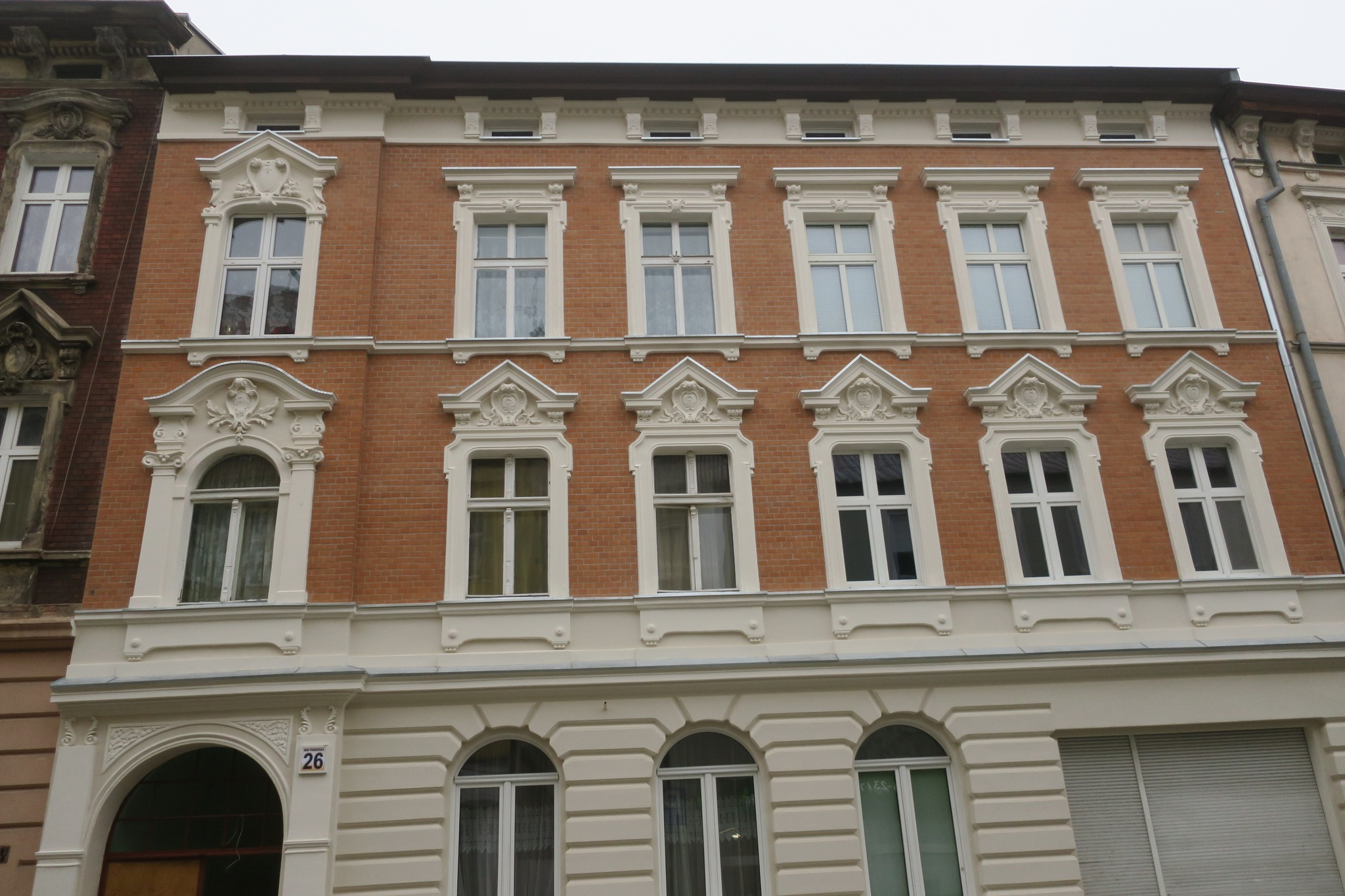
Main elevation

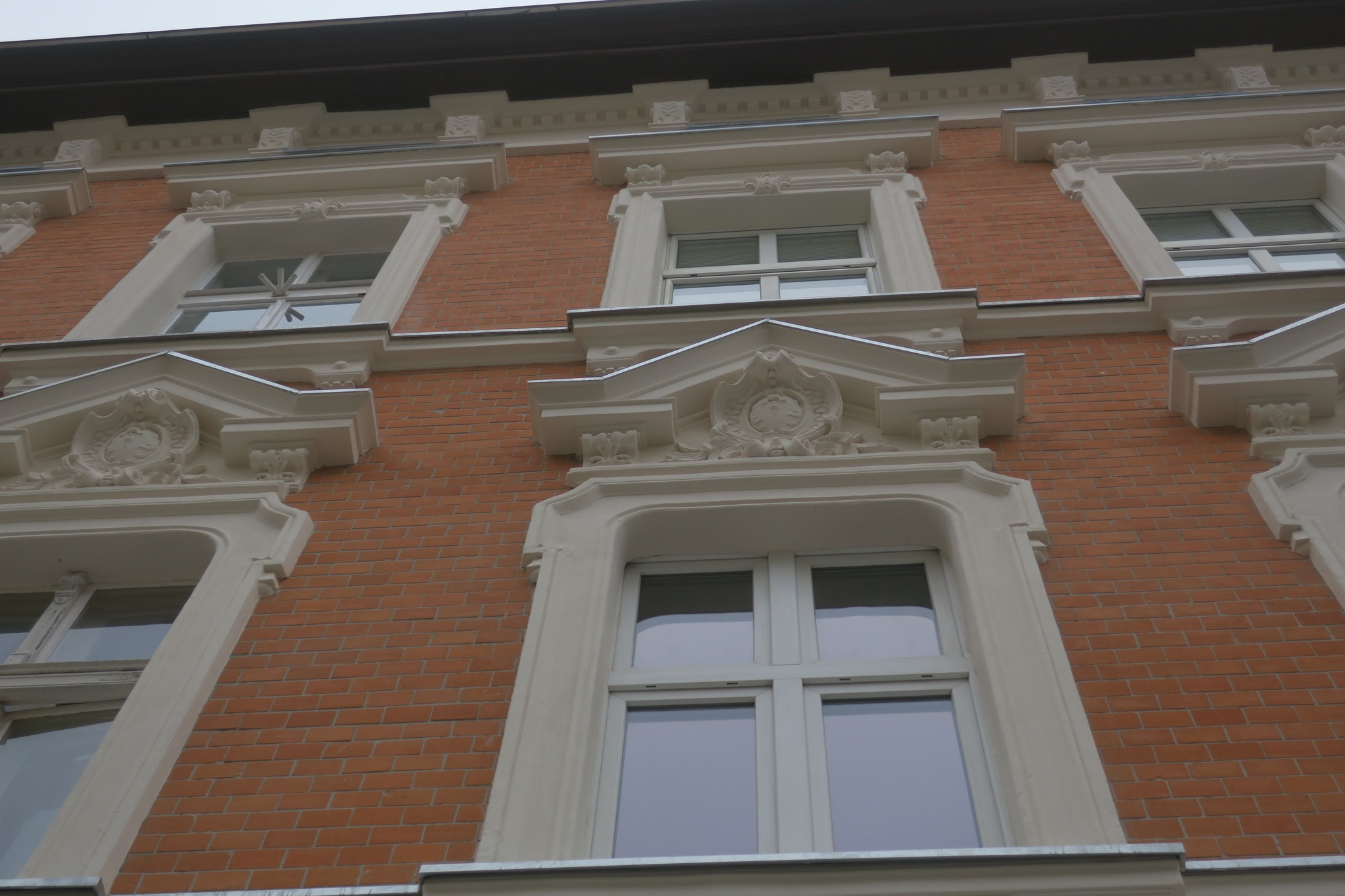
Facade detail

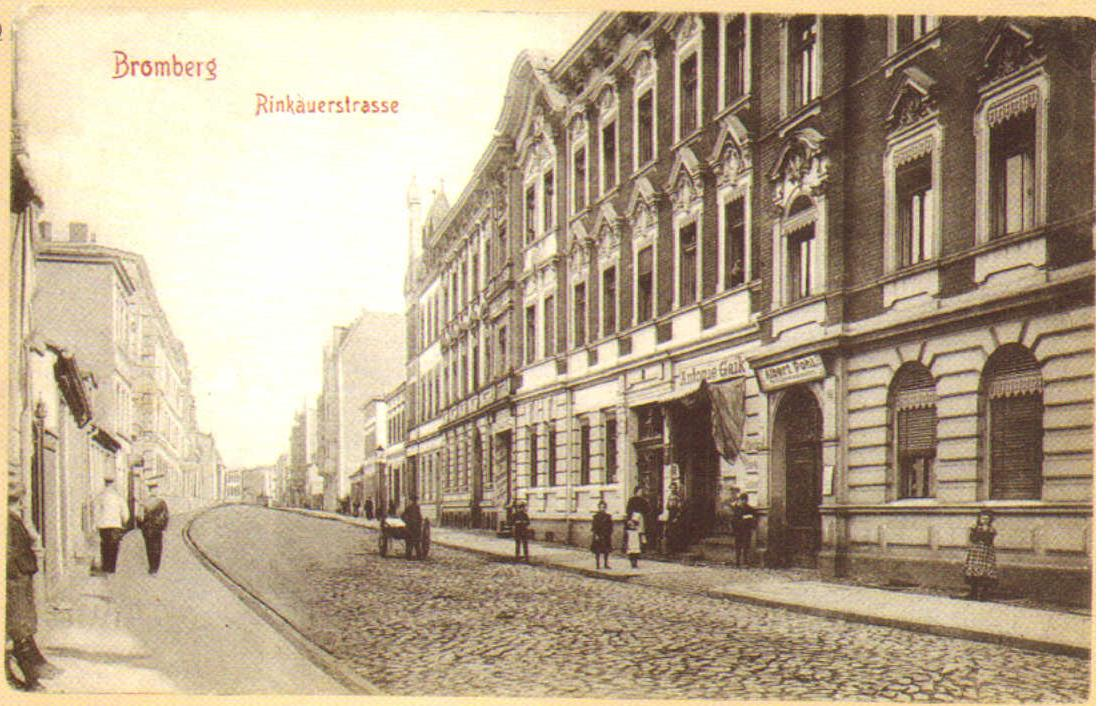
Picture from 1907

=== Hartung tenement, at 27 ===
1911–1912

Art Nouveau

The building has been commissioned by Ernest Hartung, a merchant who had his shop set up on the ground floor. He was selling delicatessen, wine and spirits. Initial address was Rinkauerstraße 18. Georg Körnig, another retailer, had his business -a hardware store- at this place.

The tenement elevation reflects nascent features of Art Nouveau in Bydgoszcz, echoing similar buildings, such as in Dworcowa Street or Vienna Secession house in Gdańska Street. The facade does not show wavy shapes (apart on the gable), typical in Art Nouveau, but its decoration boasts other architectural details:

- Long vertical lines, stressed by the bay window;
- Friezes, displaying vegetal motifs, including small scenes with animal figures, architecture symbols (trowel and hammer) and building completion date (1912);
- cartouches with ornaments and corbels.
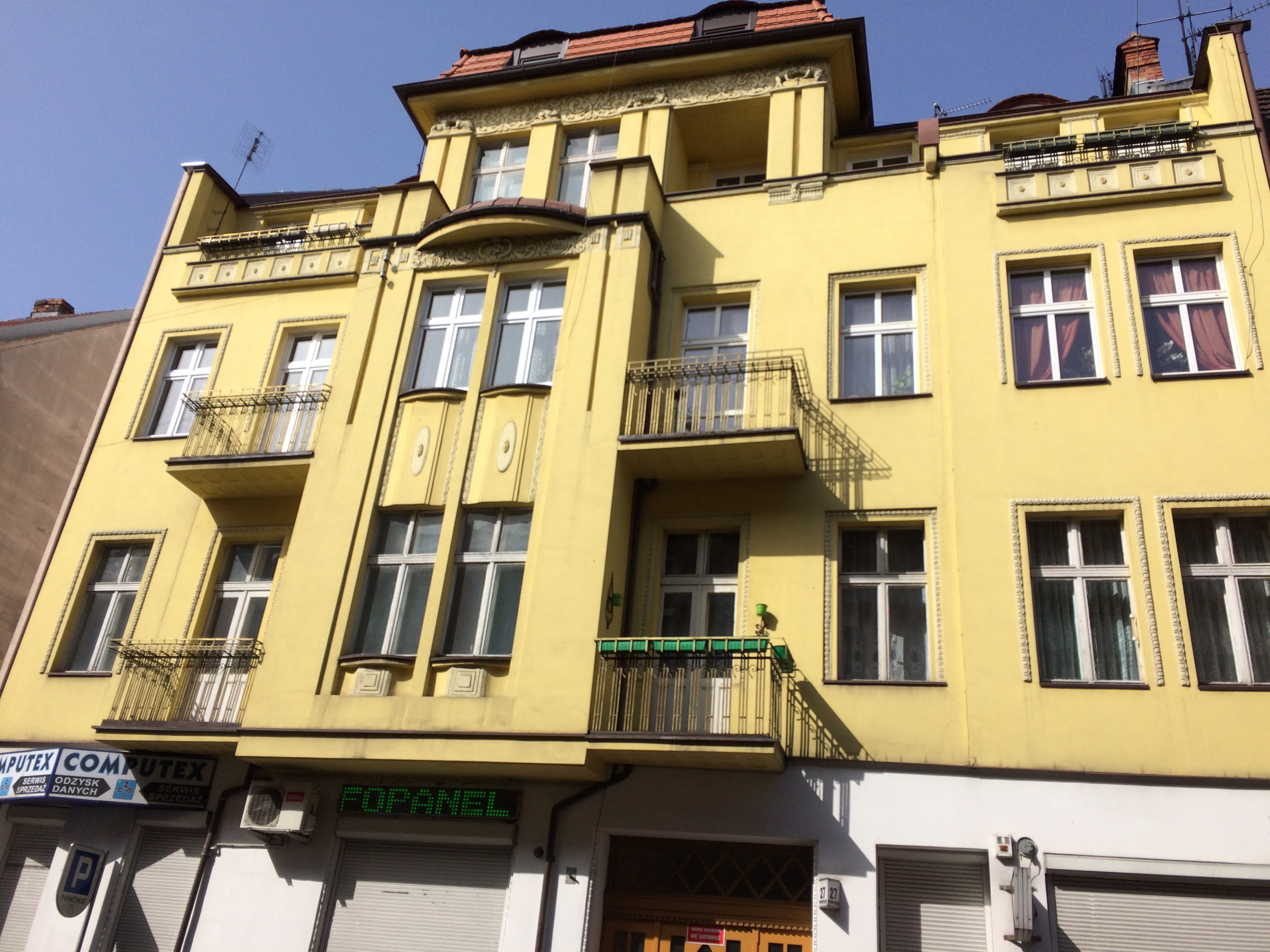
Main elevation

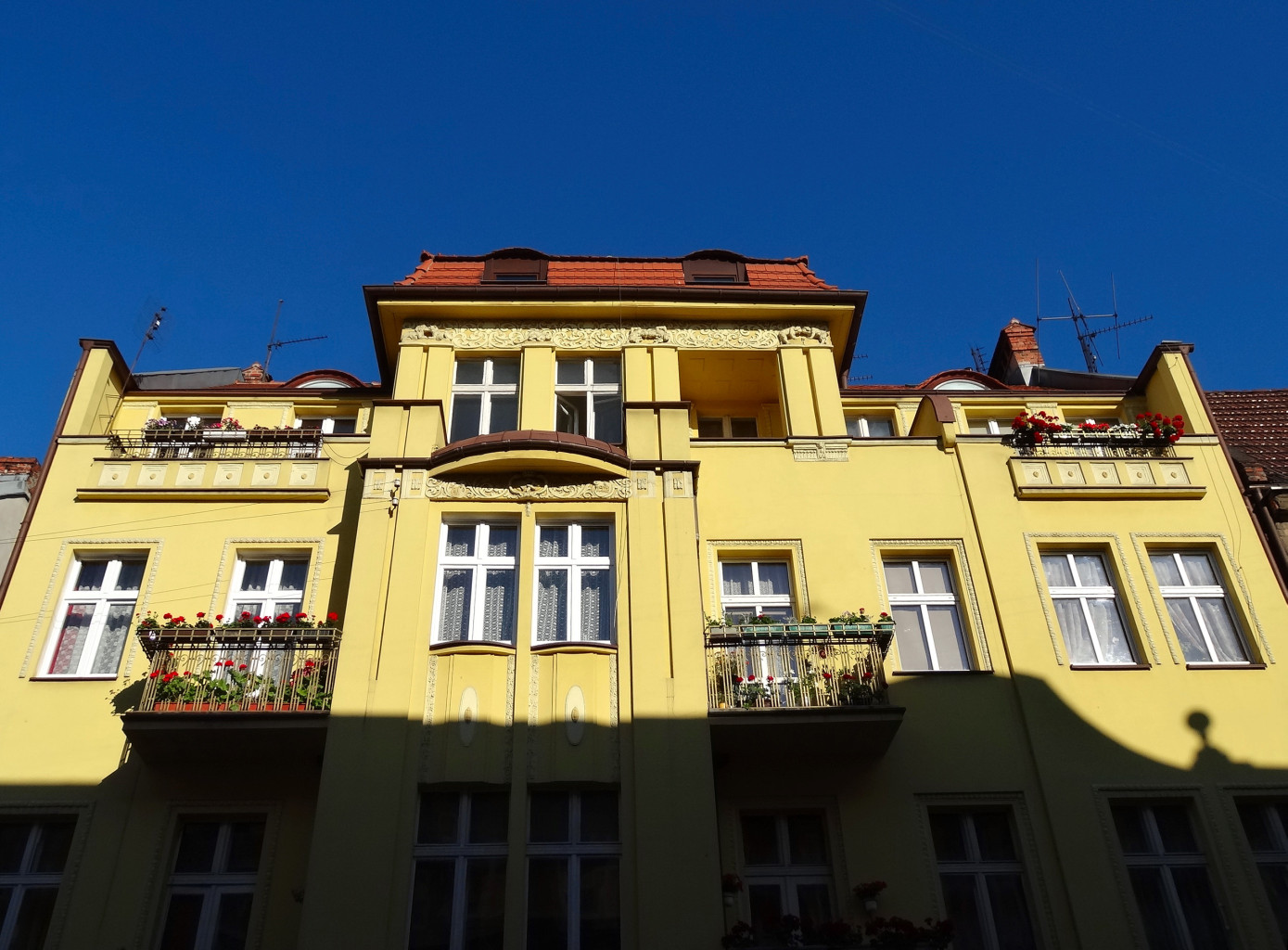
Facade with its motifs

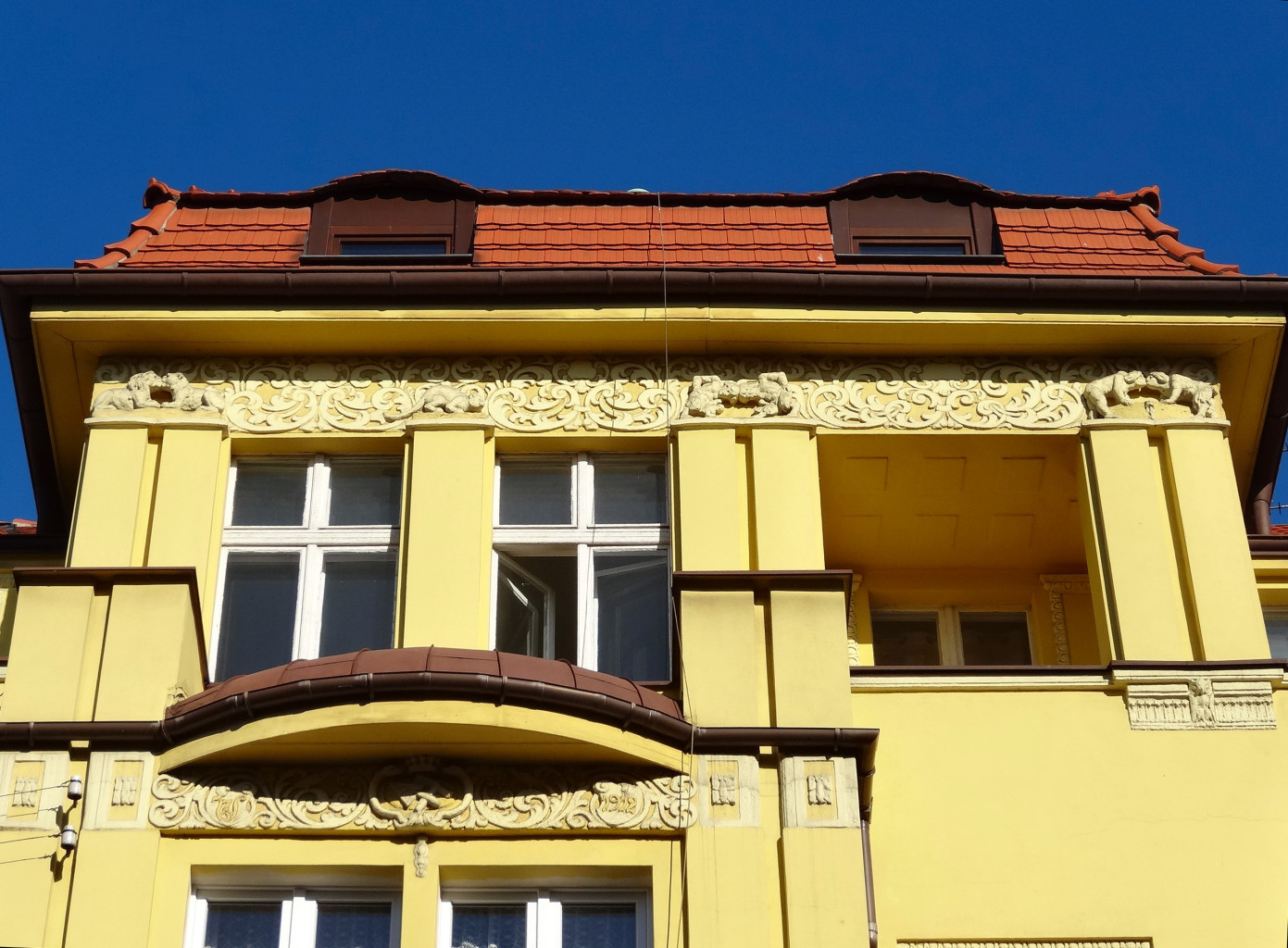
Motifs details

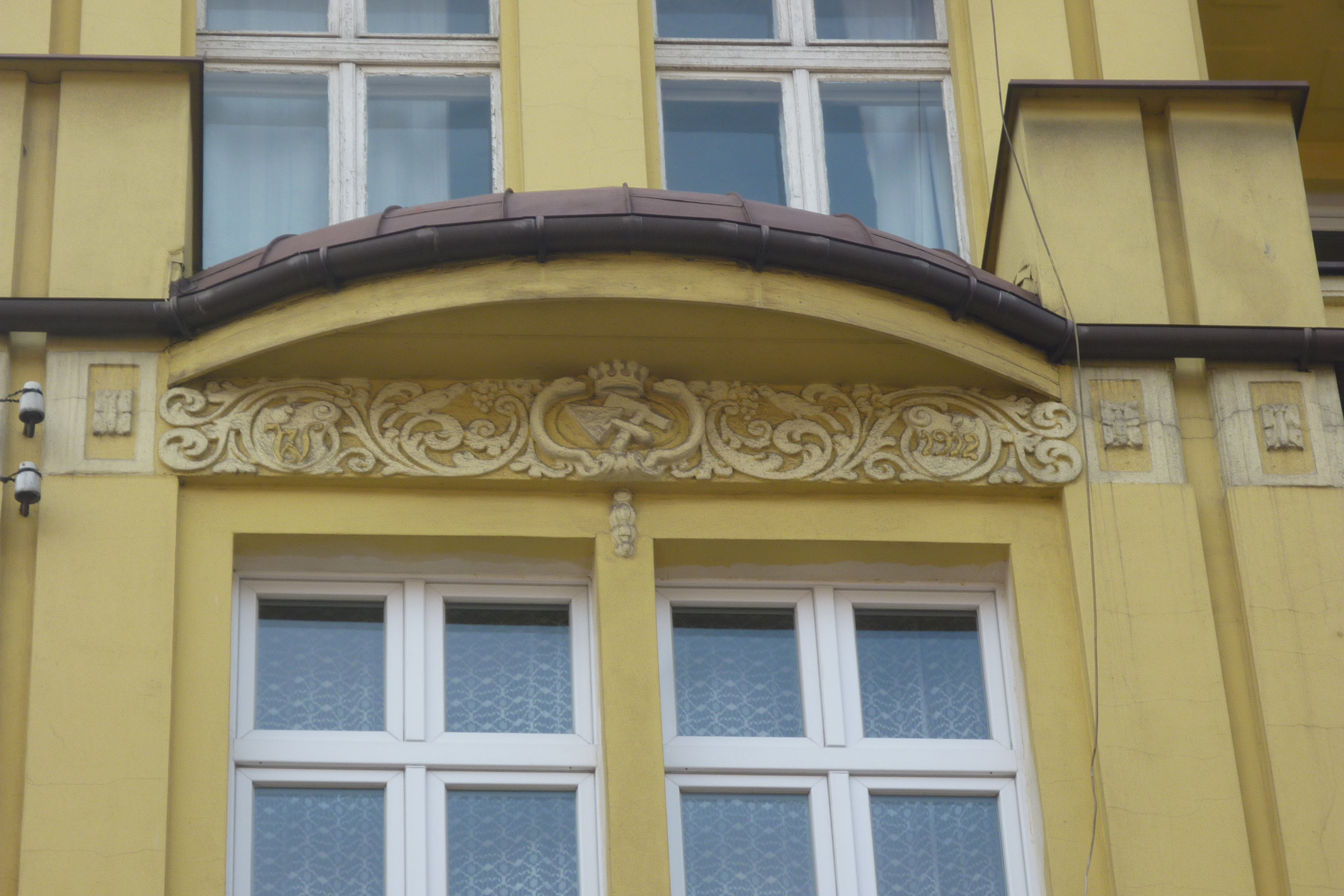
Bottom frieze

=== Tenement at 28 ===
1896–1897

Eclecticism

This tenement, at then Rinkauerstraße 57, was owned most of the Prussian period by a tailor, Friedrich Frommholz.

The building was constructed at the same time as its neighbours at Nr.26 and 30. It mirrors more closely Nr.30 architectural features: adorned pediments at each floor, corbels at the top and a light avant-corps topped with a gable and vegetal ornaments.

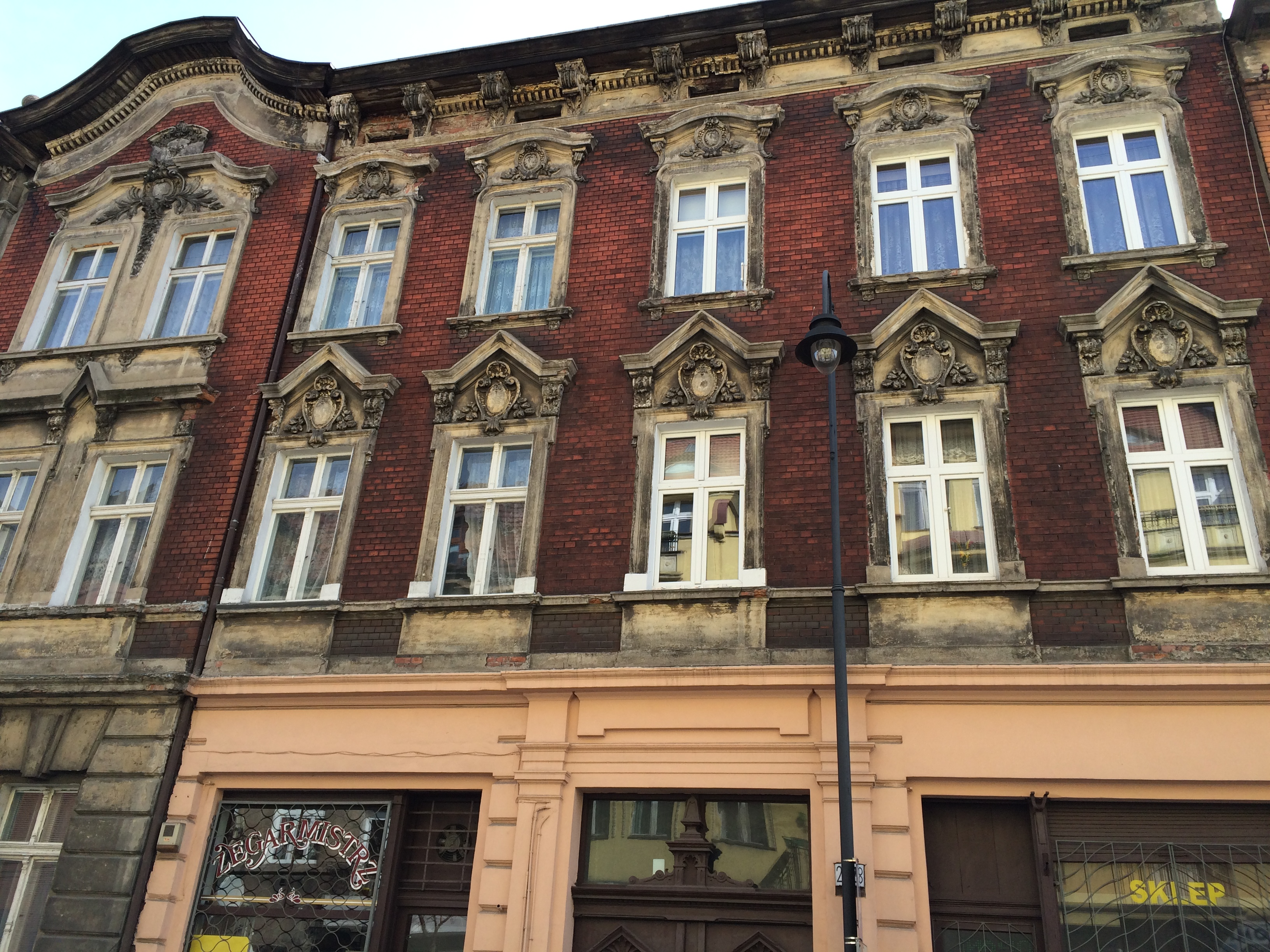
Main elevation

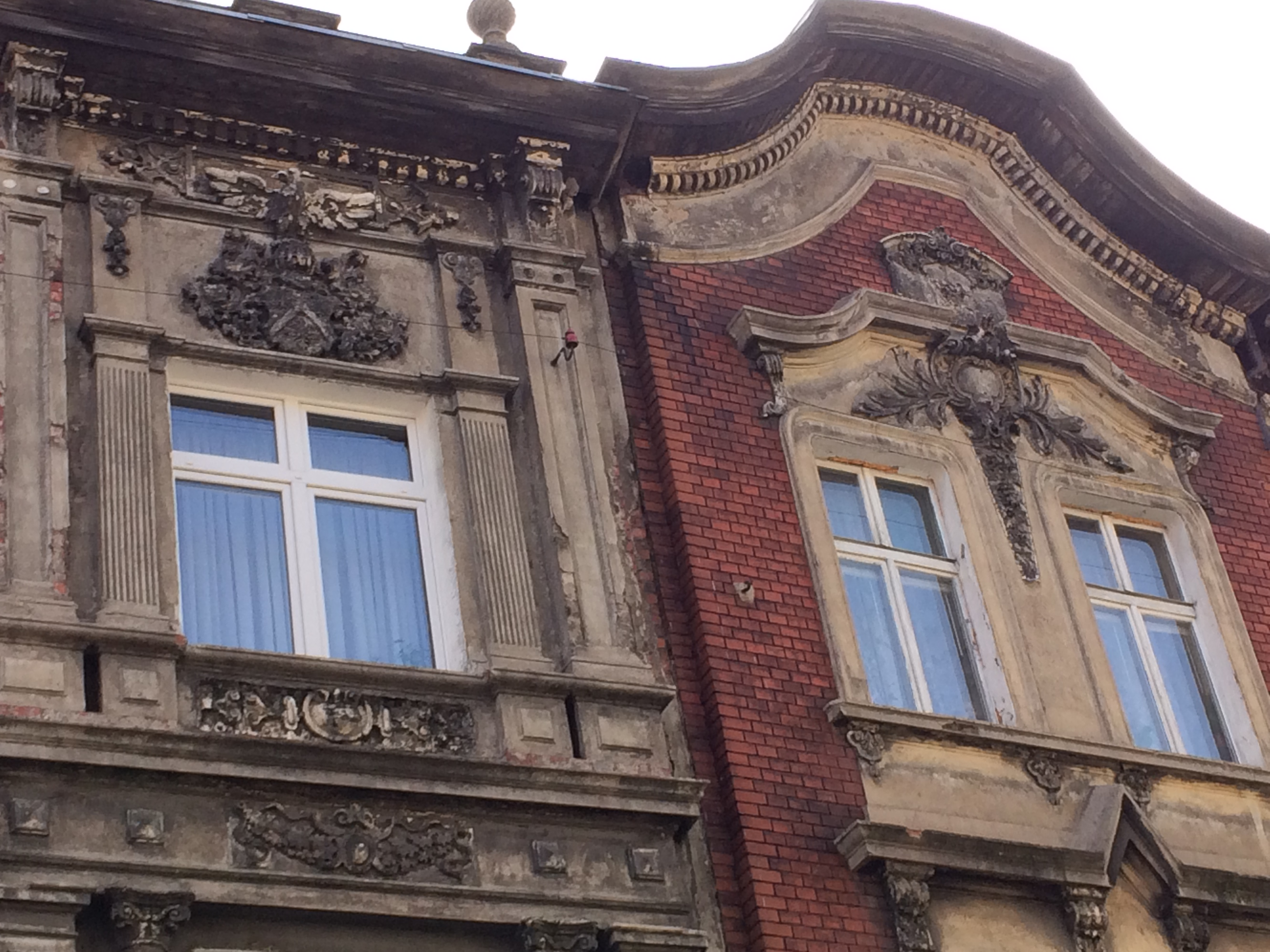
Motifs details

=== Tenement at 29 ===
1880s

Eclecticism, Art Nouveau motifs

The tenement at then Rinkauerstraße 19 has been the property of Ernest Hartung, also owner of Nr.18. It dates back to the same period, i.e. the 1910s.

The specificity of this edifice is that, albeit it lost a majority of its architectural details, superb Art Nouveau ornaments are still preserved:

- A stylized eagle above the entry gate,
- Motifs on the first floor,
- Vegetal decoration on the second floor, wavy shapes as a frieze on top.
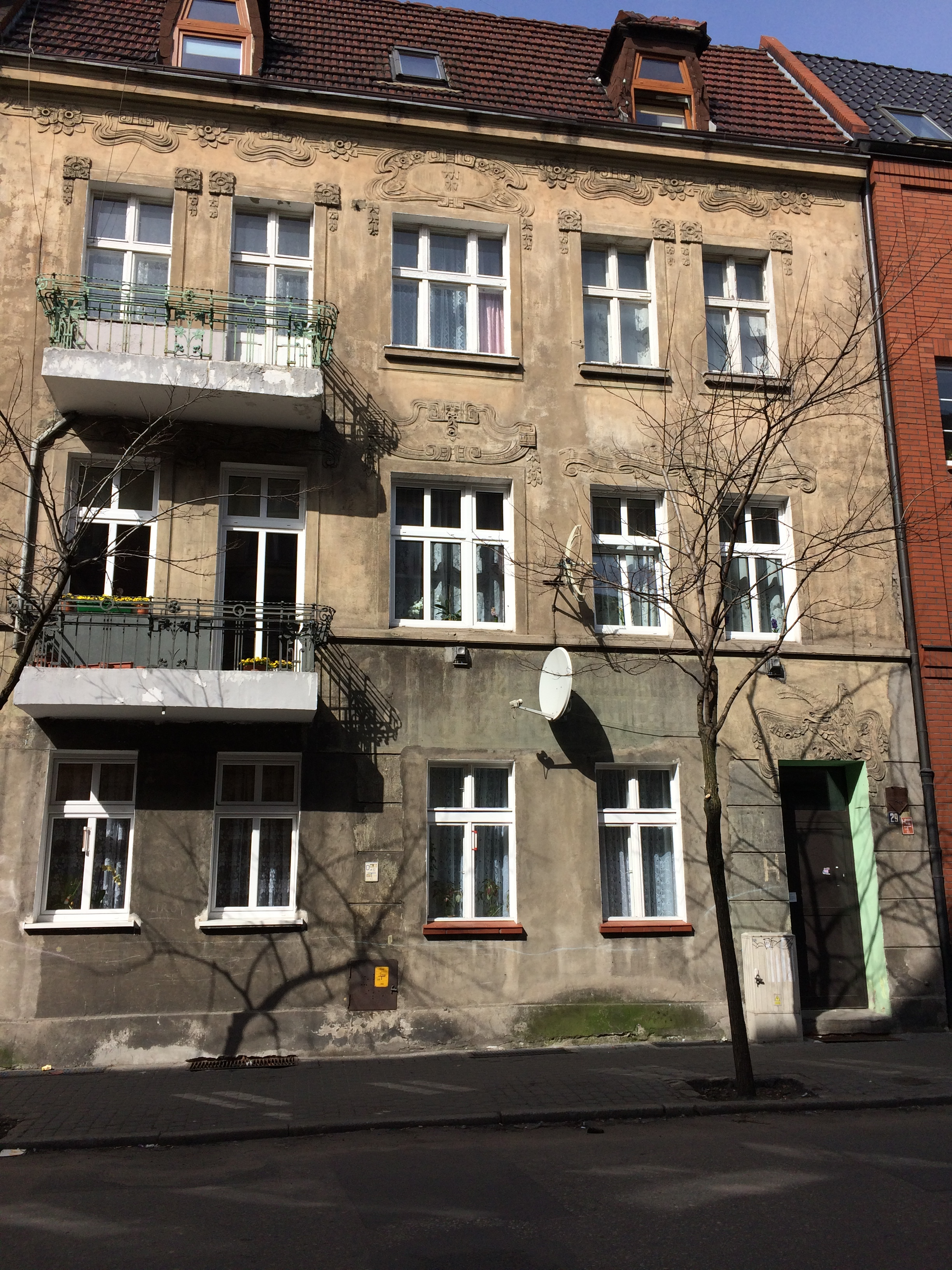
Main elevation

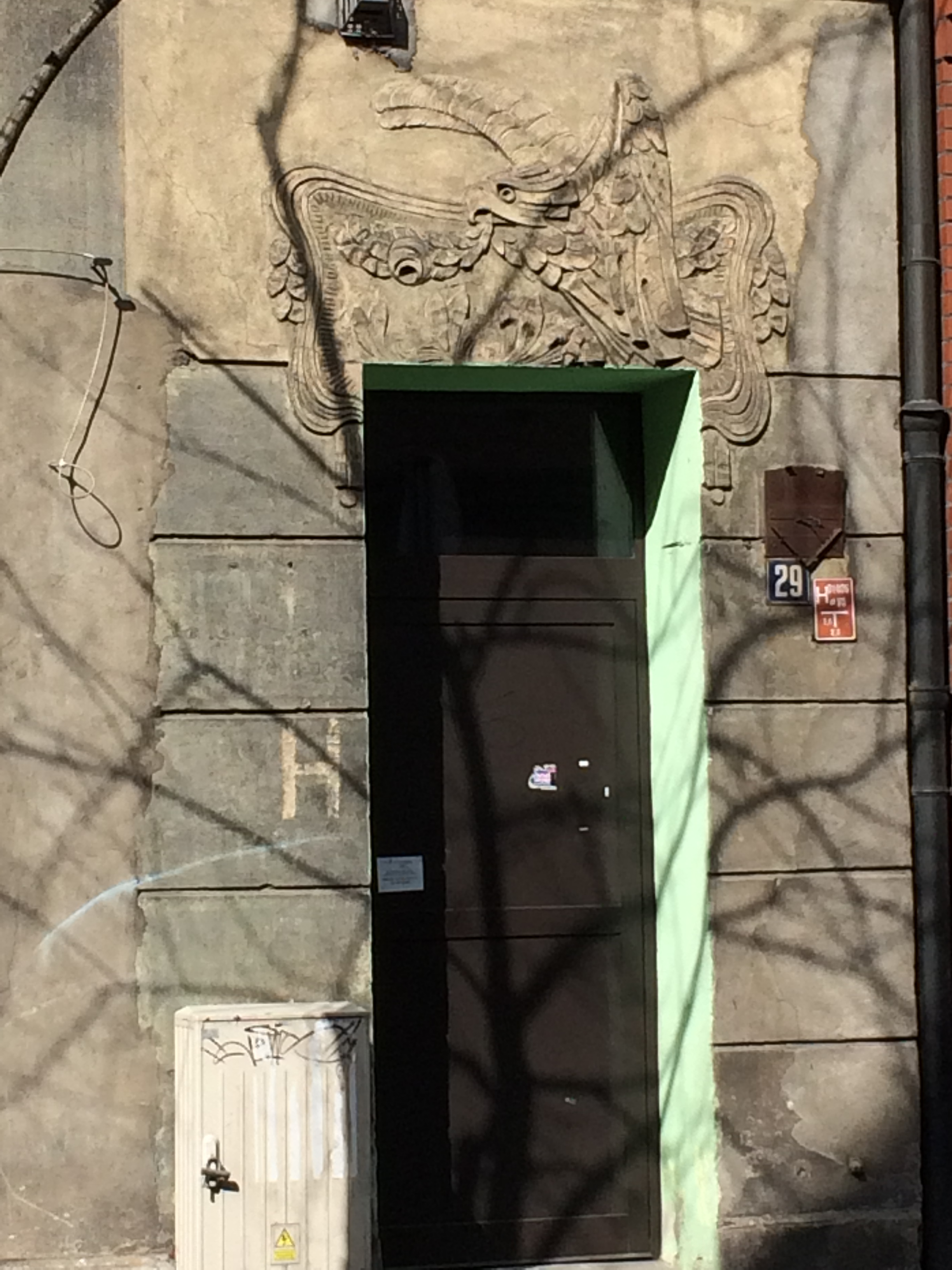
Entry Gate

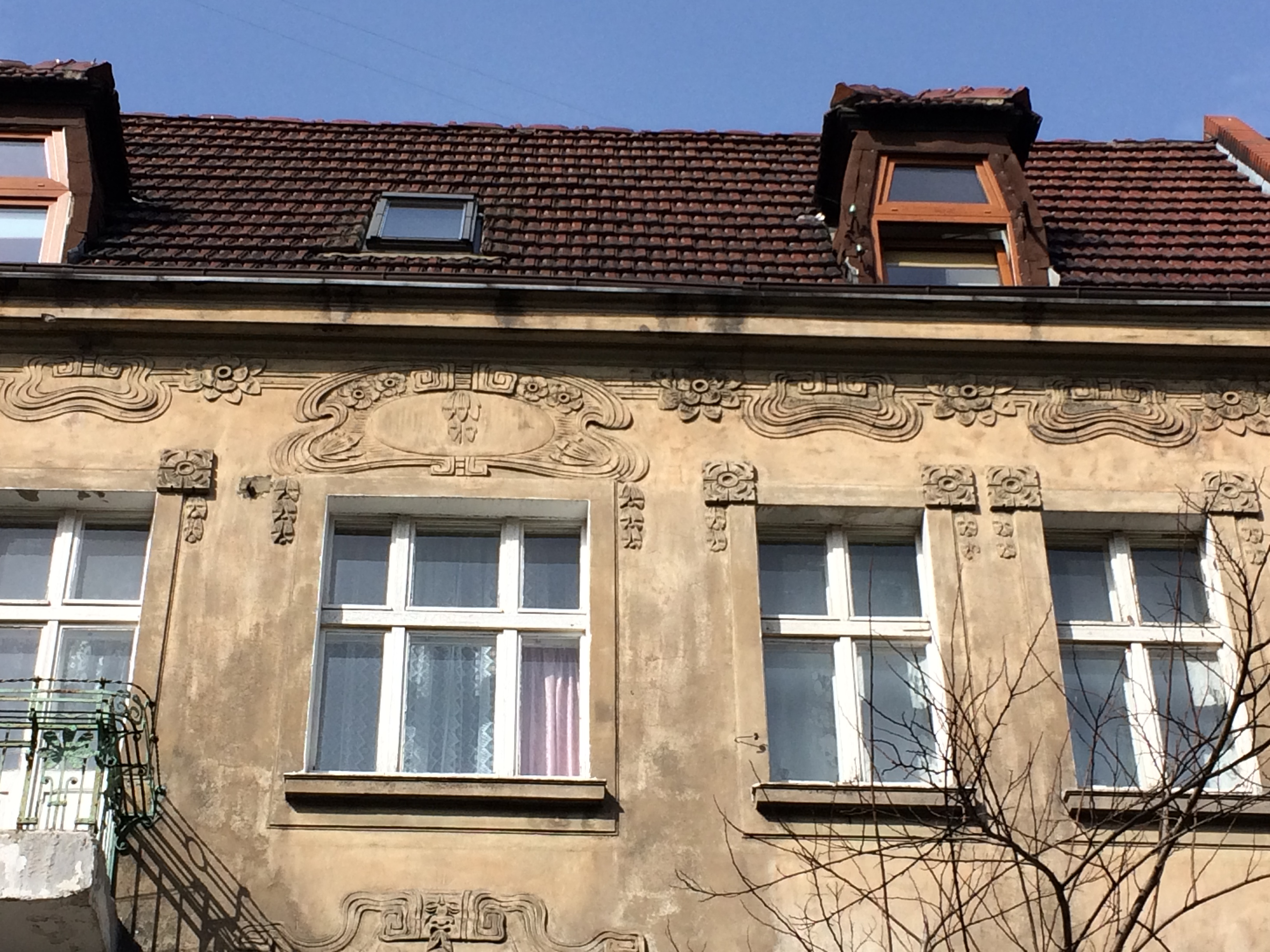
Art nouveau motifs

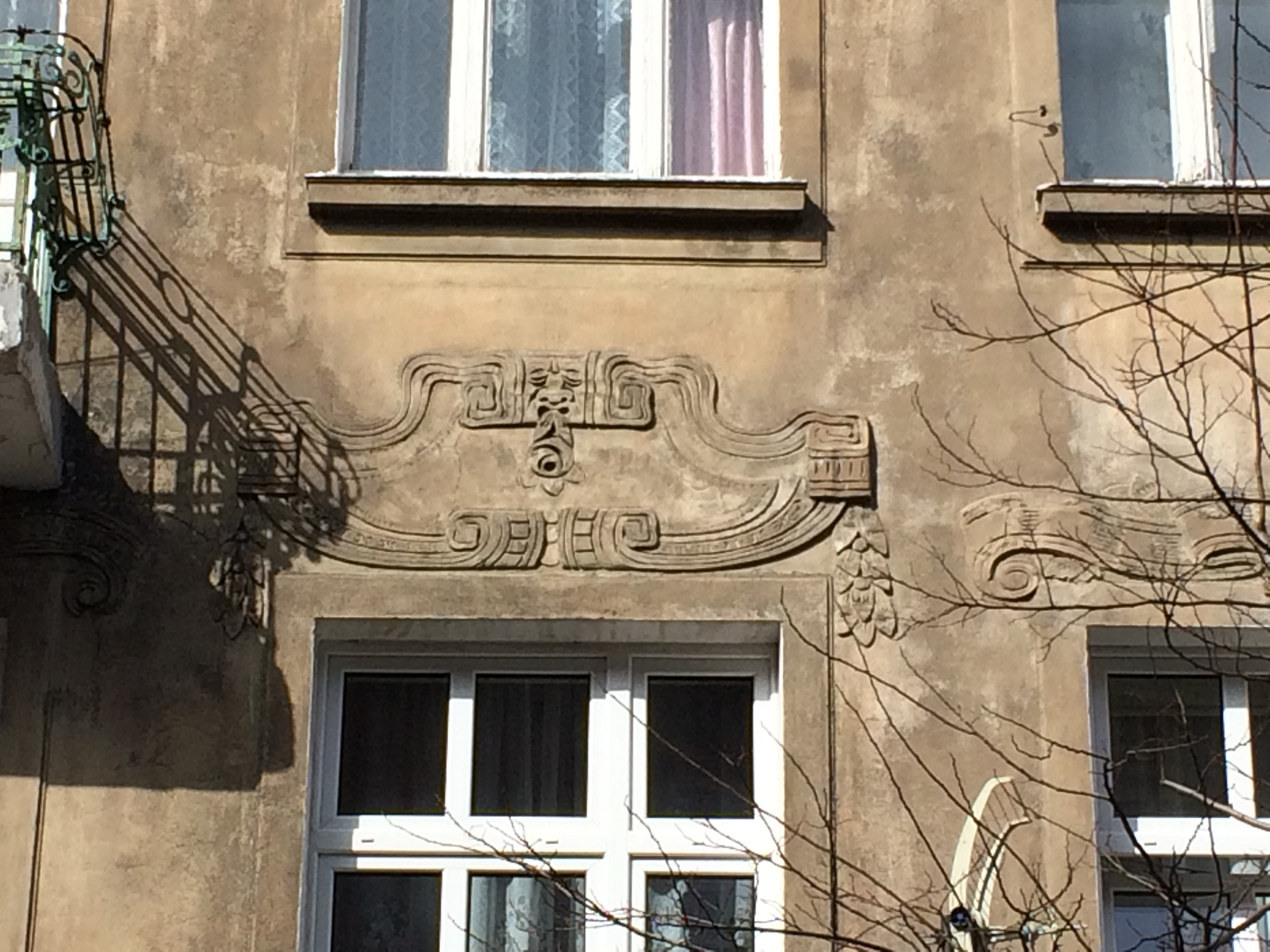
Art Nouveau motif details

=== Tenement at 29A, corner with Chrobrego street ===
1999

Modern architecture

Reconstructed at the end of the 20th century, the building mimics the brick edifices of the previous century, exposing a bay window. The plot has been built since 1895 but was identified under 19 Rinkauerstaße (today's Pomorska street).

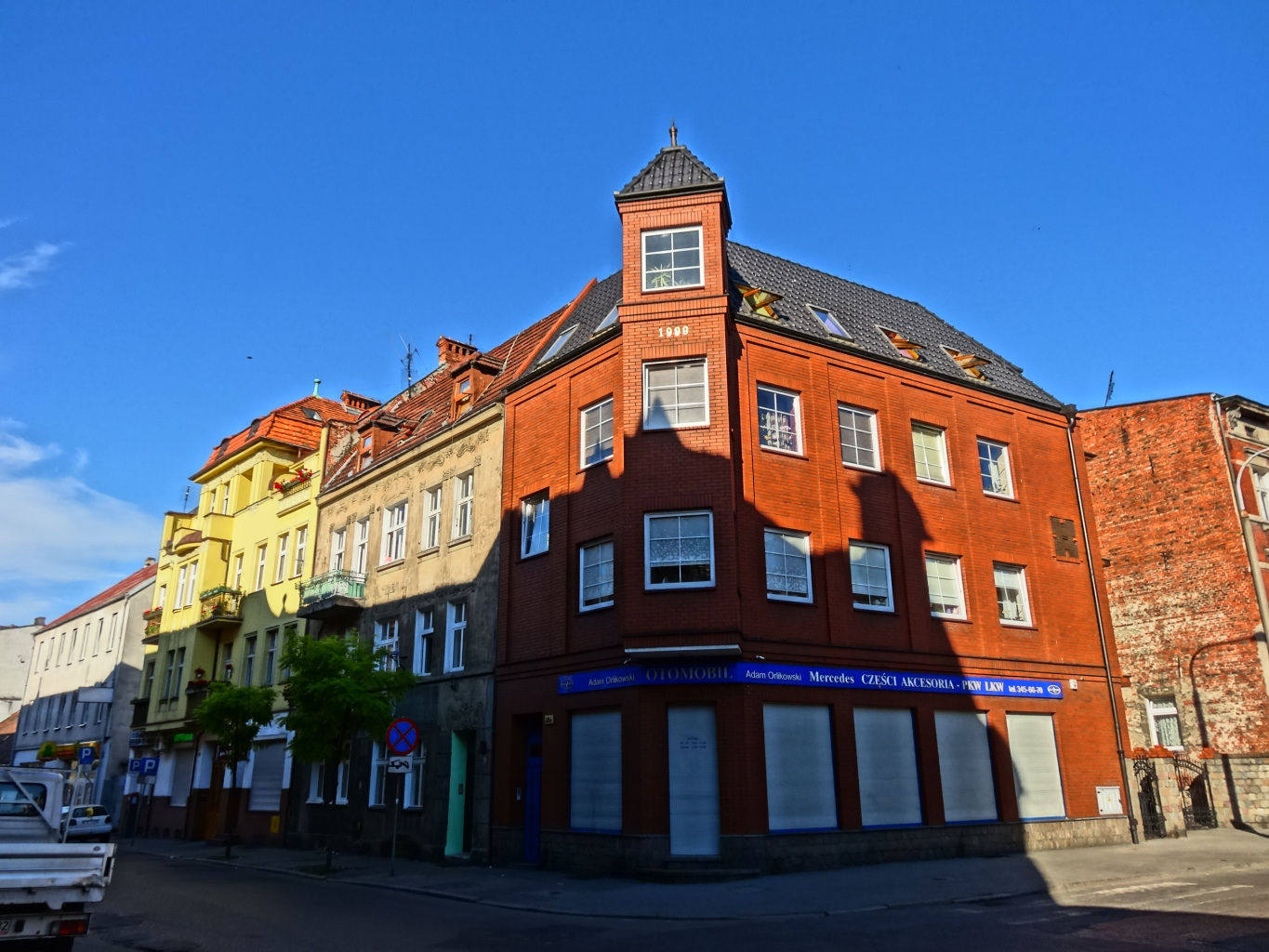
View from street crossing

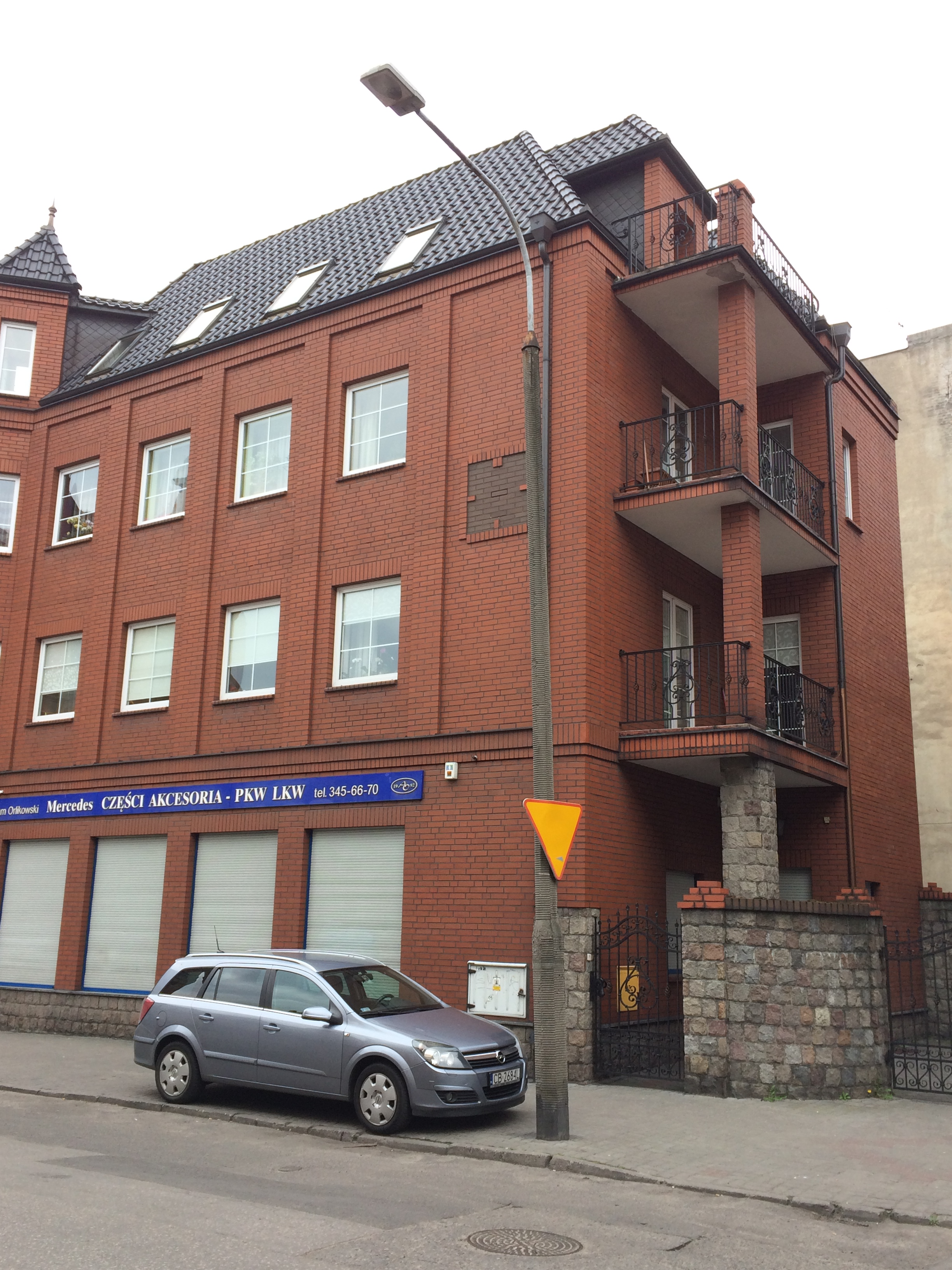
Facade on Chrobrego street

=== Tenement at 30 ===
1893–1894

Eclecticism

Initial address was Rinkauerstraße 56: Antonie ßawlicka, a widow, owned the building -as well as Nr.32- but did not live there. A carpenter, Ernst Klawonn, was landlord of both edifices (30 & 32) after the turn of the 20th century.

The building style echoes closely the one at Nr.28, offering a sort of continuity in the facade decoration. One will notice:

- the main gate, topped by a figure of bearded man,
- the right side of the elevation, underlined by pilasters, adorned cartouche and the figure of a spread-wing eagle overlooking a coat of arms on the second level.
- a series of cartouches and corbels below the roof line.
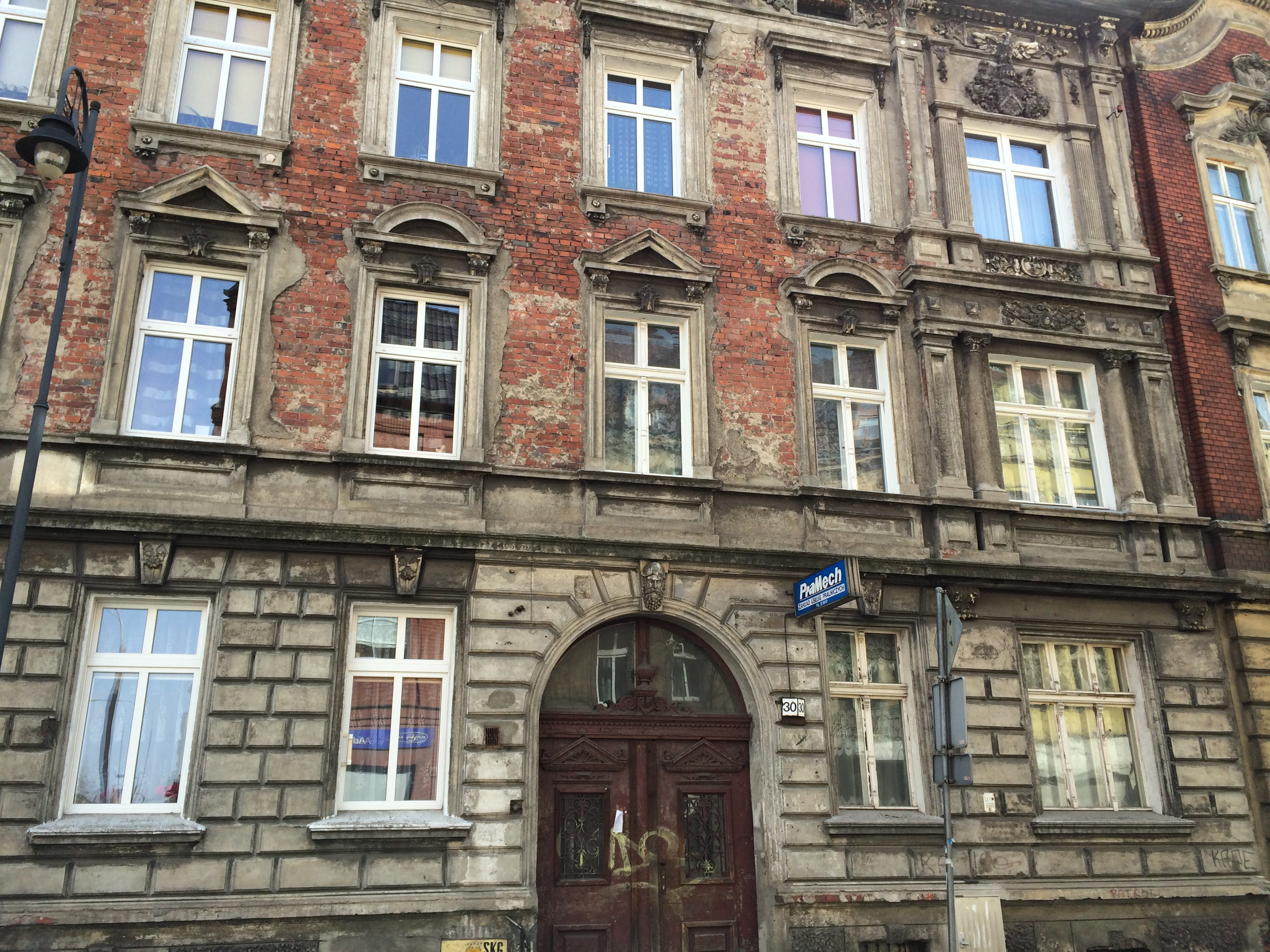
Main elevation

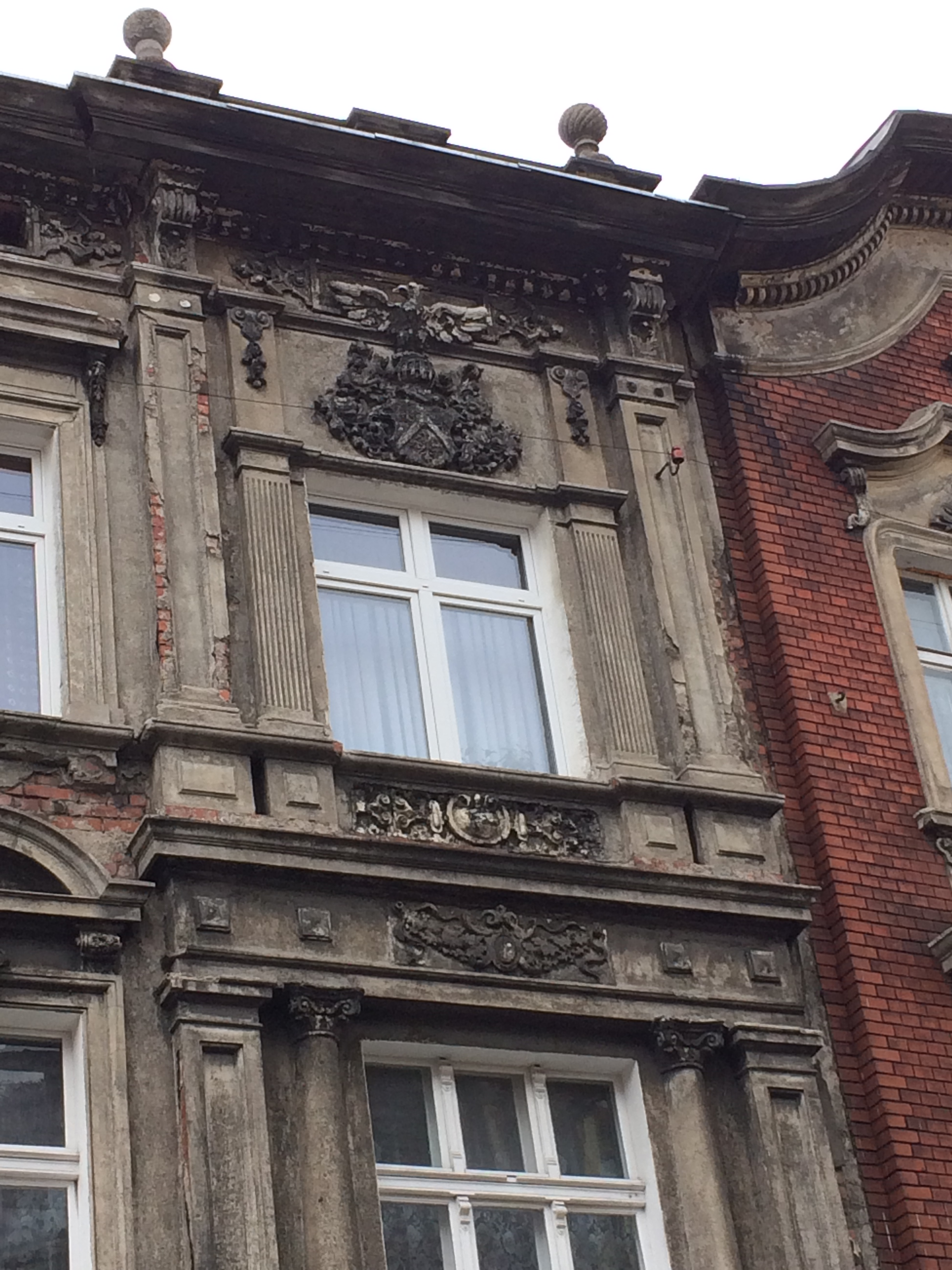
Motifs details

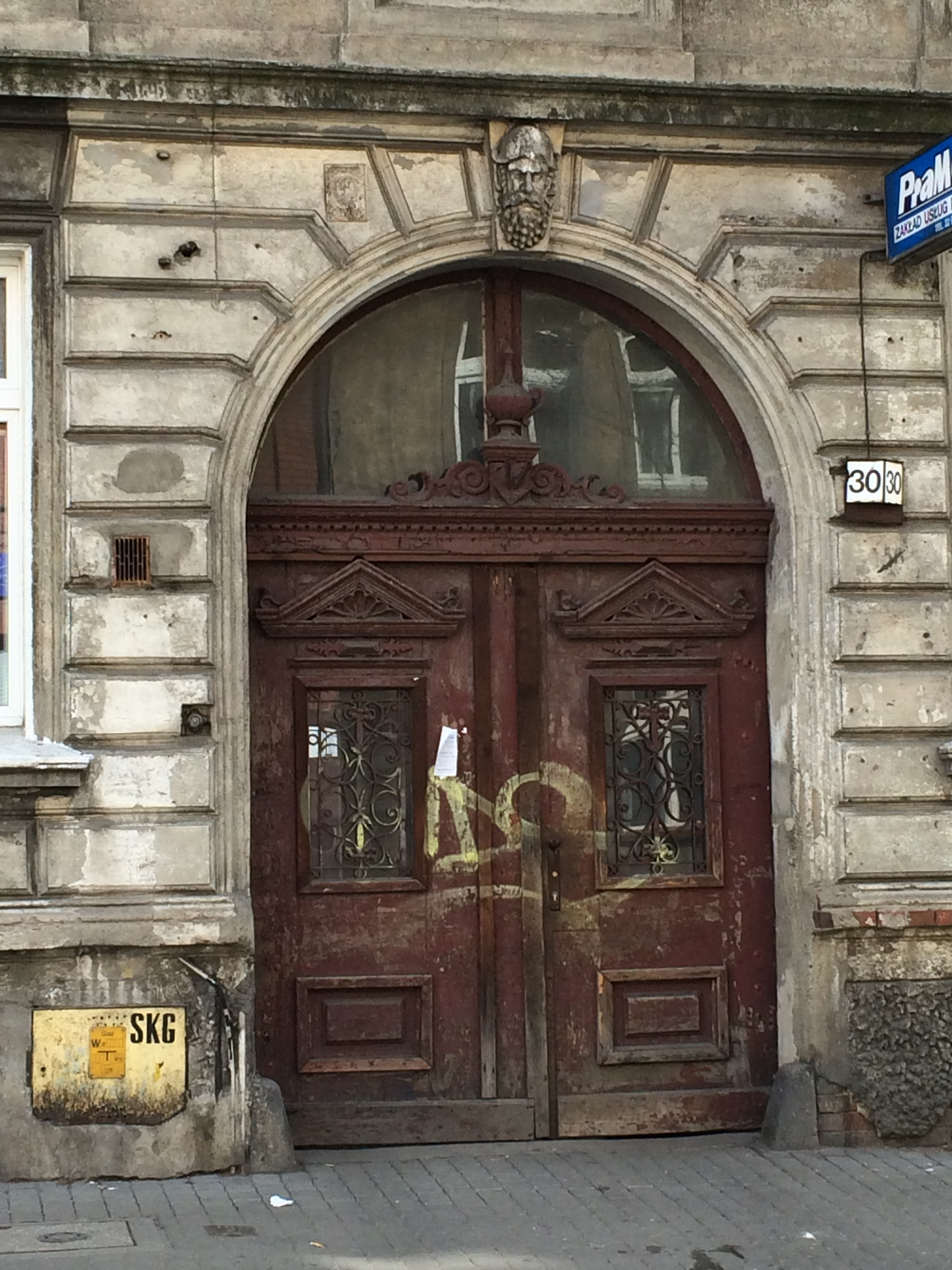
Main gate

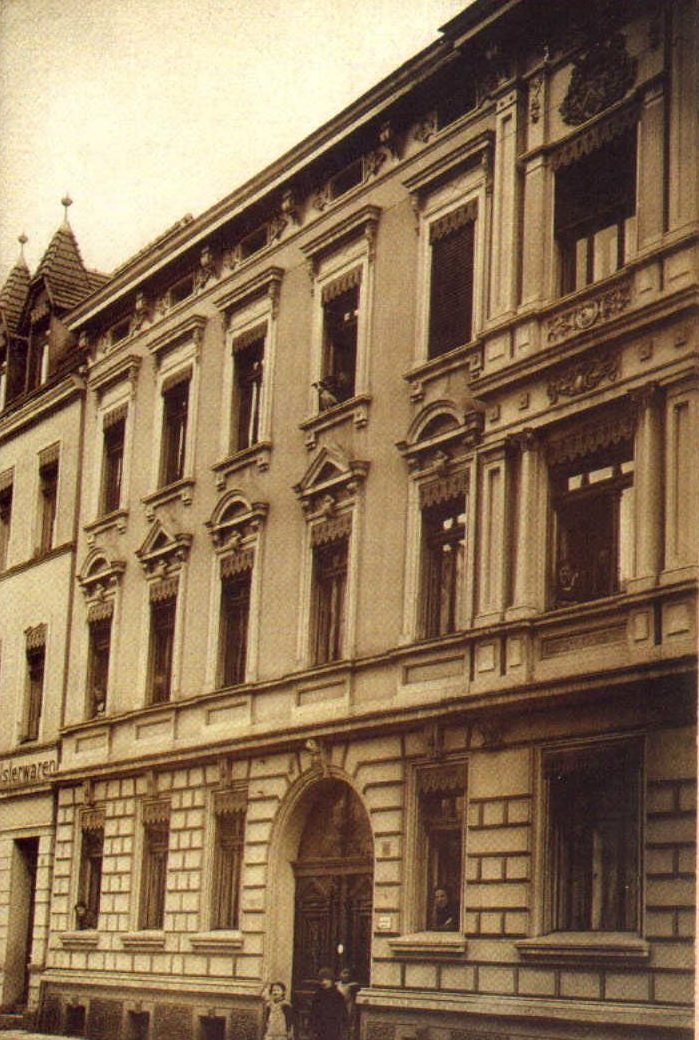
The building ca 1914

=== Tenement at 31, corner with 2 Chrobrego street ===
1892-1893

Eclecticism

This building, together with the neighbouring in Chrobrego street, have been commissioned and managed by the Beamten – Wohnungsverein GmbH Bromberg (Housing Association Bromberg) till 1920, then by the Bydgoska Spółdzielnia Mieszkaniowa (Bydoszcz Housing Cooperative). The aim of both bodies was to provide housing for fair prices to those in need, managing several dozens of tenements in various districts of the city.

Renovated in 2020, the decoration of its entrance door is of particular interest.

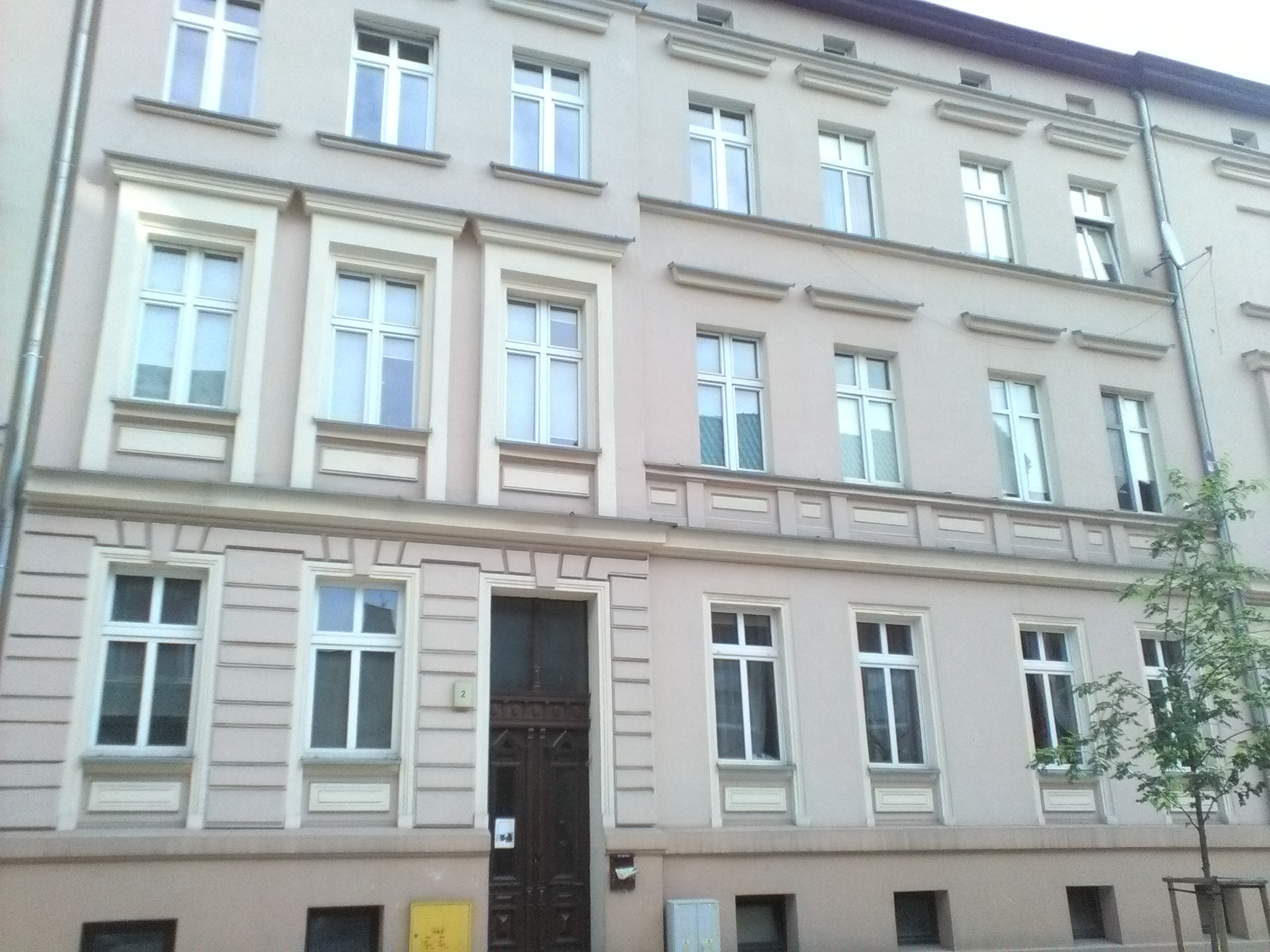
Facade at Nr.2

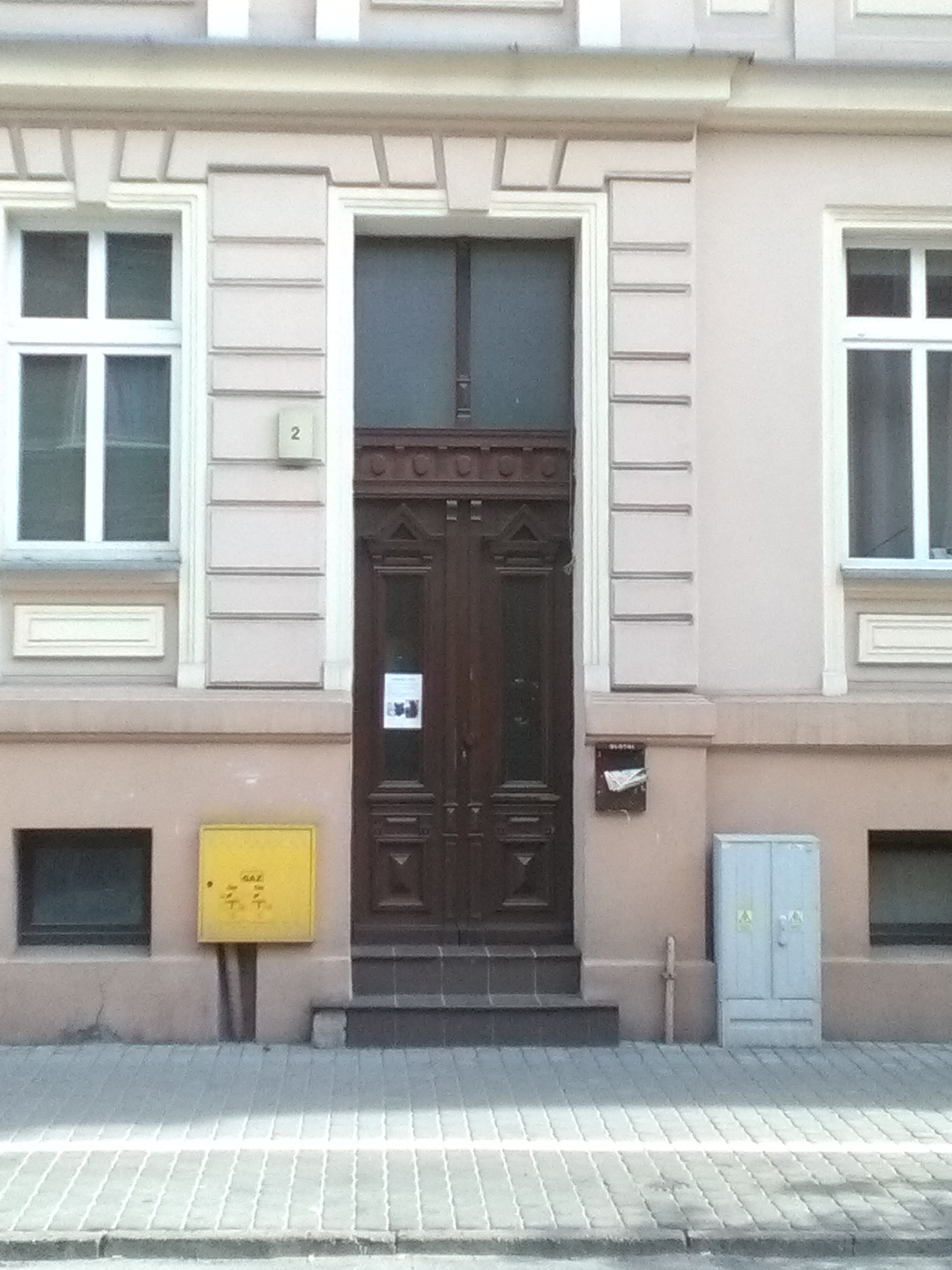
Adorned door at Nr.2

=== Tenement at 32 ===
1899–1901

Eclecticism

The tenement stood initially at Rinkauerstraße 55: Antonie ßawlicka, a widow, owned the building -as well as Nr.30. At the beginning of the 20th century, a carpenter, Ernst Klawonn, was landlord of both Nr.32 and 30. He developed in the 1920s a furniture and woodwork workshop at the place.

The building's facade lost all its decoration. One can still notice two kernel dormers and a bell shape gable. The door still displays the former street number (55) from the Prussian era, kept until the end of the 1920s.

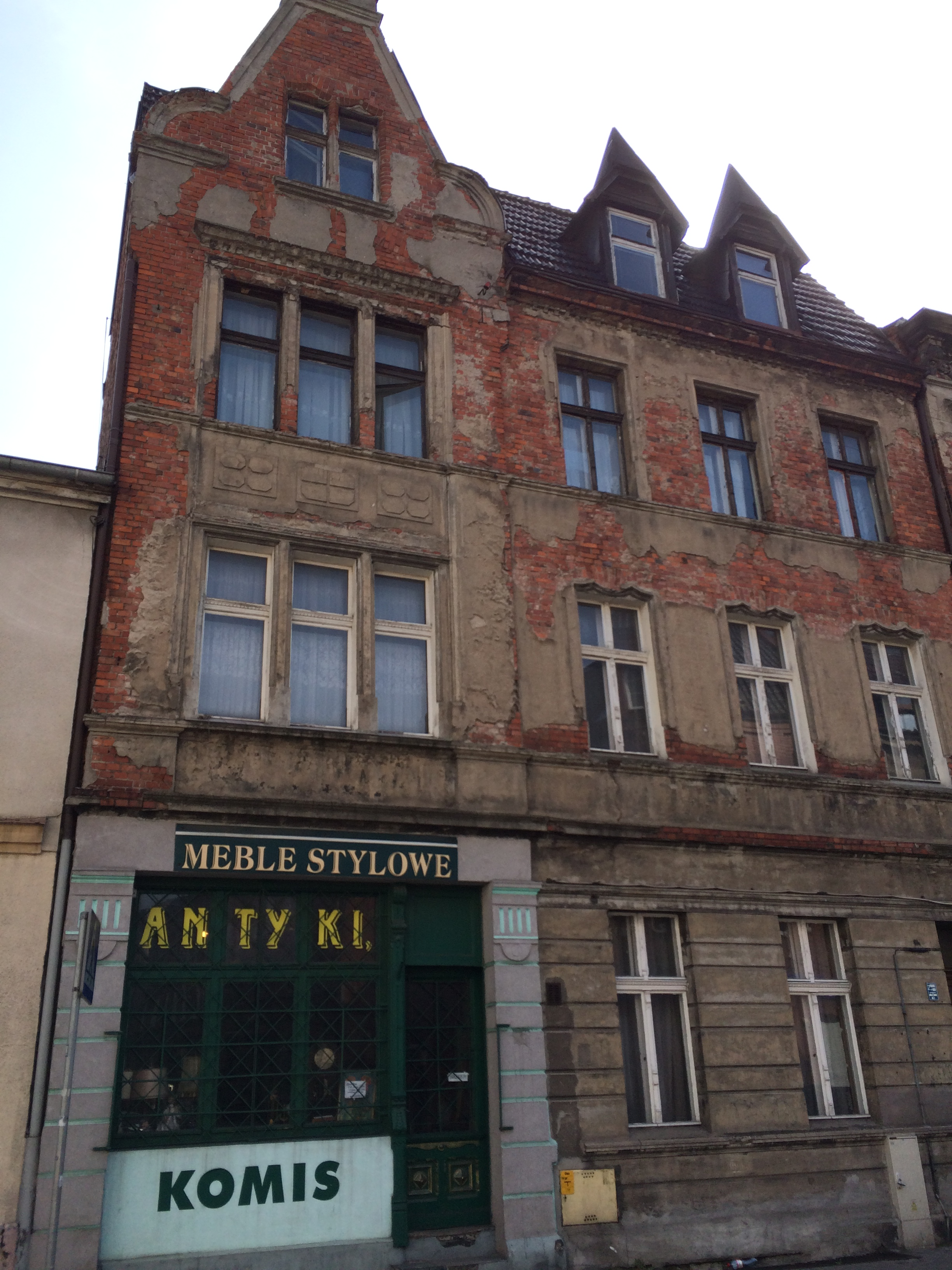
Main elevation on the street

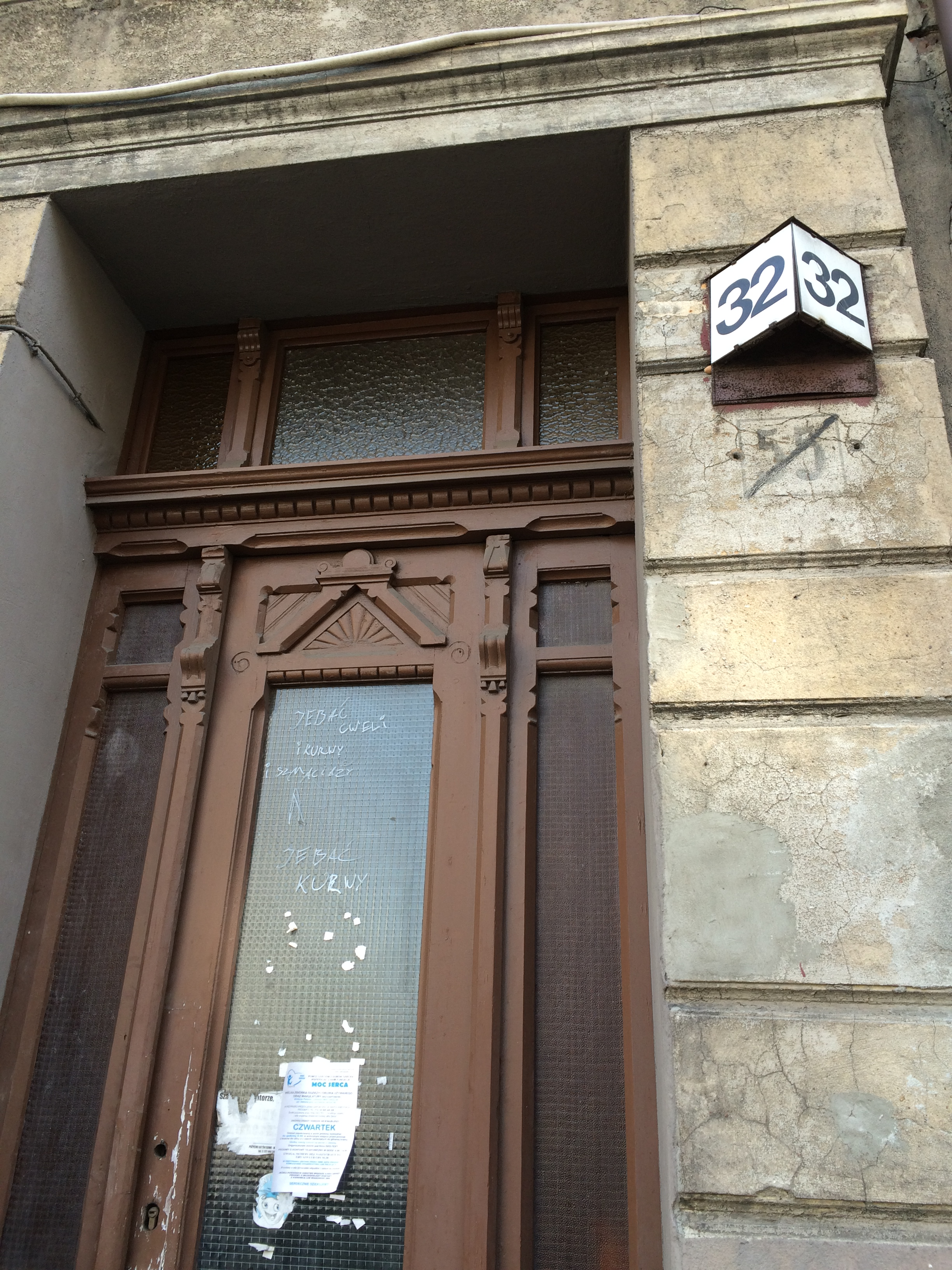
Gate with old numeration (55) still visible

=== Tenement at 35, corner house with Kwiatowa street ===
1897–1899, by Fritz Weidner

Eclecticism & forms of Neo-Baroque and Art Nouveau

Hermann Schulz, a wealthy baker, charged Fritz Weidner to design his habitation, which initial address was Rinkauerstraße 22-23. A thorough refurbishment has been carried out in 2015 by a real estate firm.

Architecturally, the facade echoes the style of corner house with Podolska street, at the southern part of Pomorska street. The façade of the building is decorated with reliefs, floral stucco ornaments and putti. Arched windows, loggias, balconies flanked by massive columns richly adorn the elevation. One can underline the detailed low-relief of Demeter with Cupid as a putto on the first floor, testifying to the wealth of original owner (H. Schulz): as a baker, the image of the goddess of corn, grain, and harvest could be the only patron.

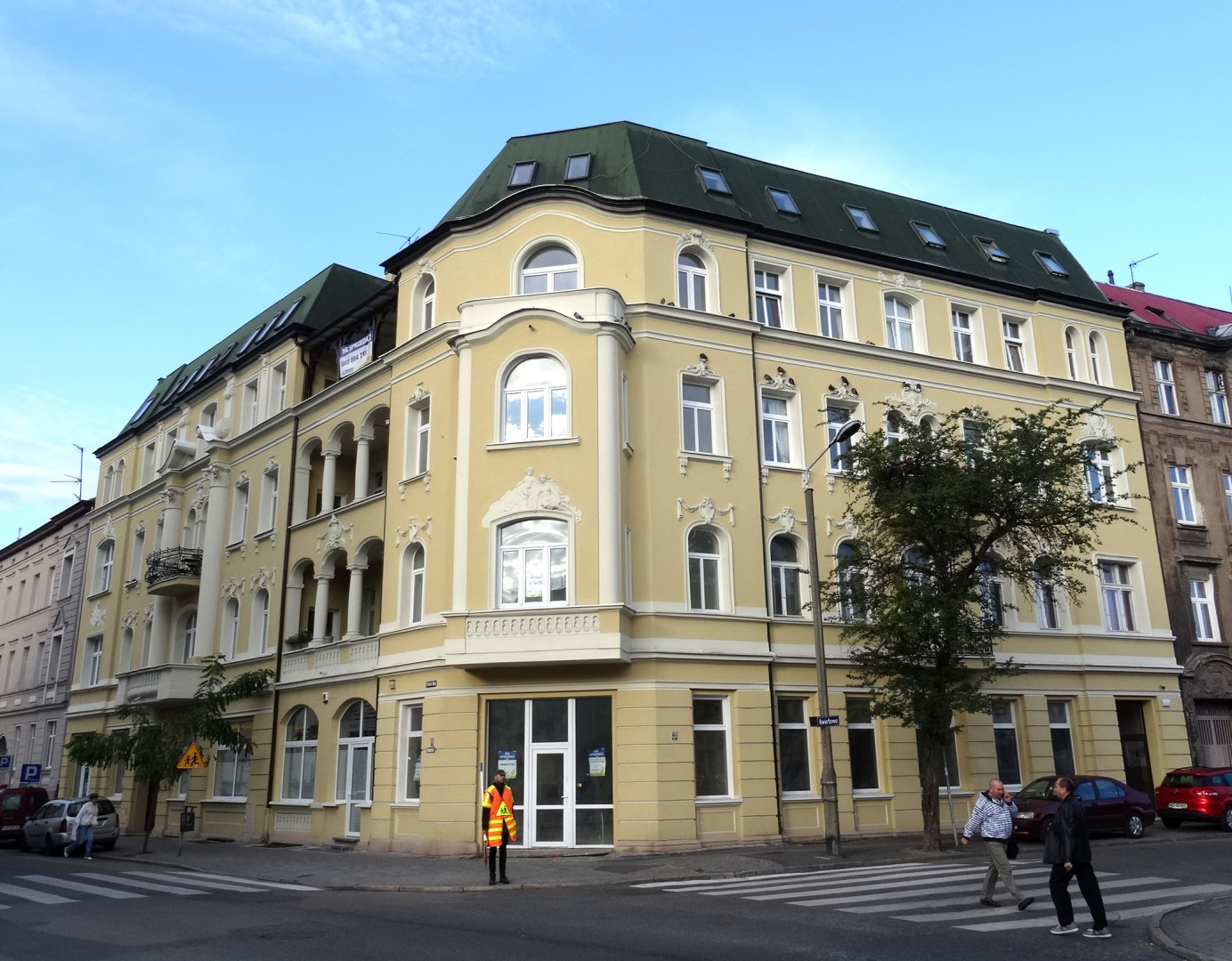
Corner view of both facades

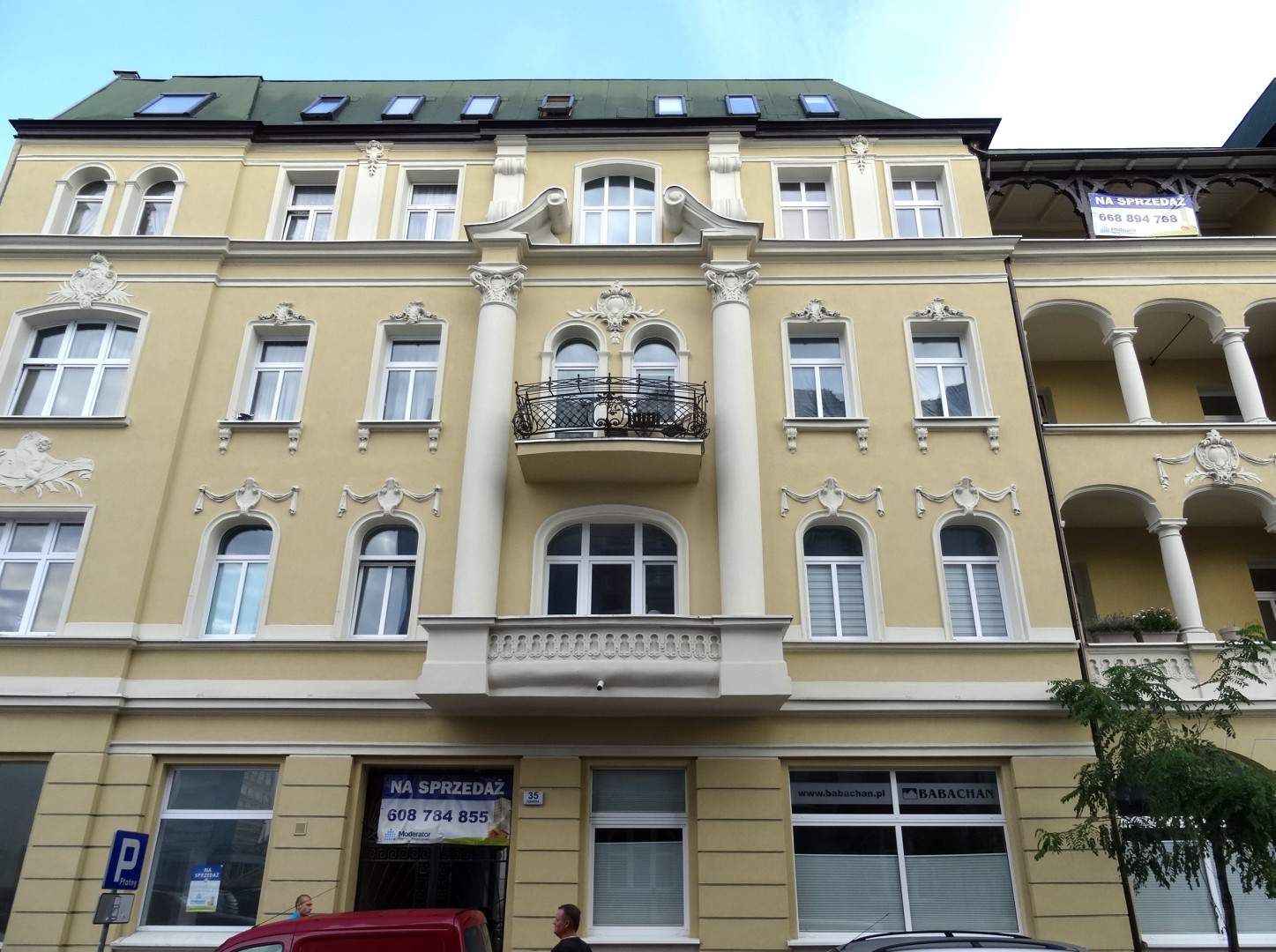
Facade on Pomorska street

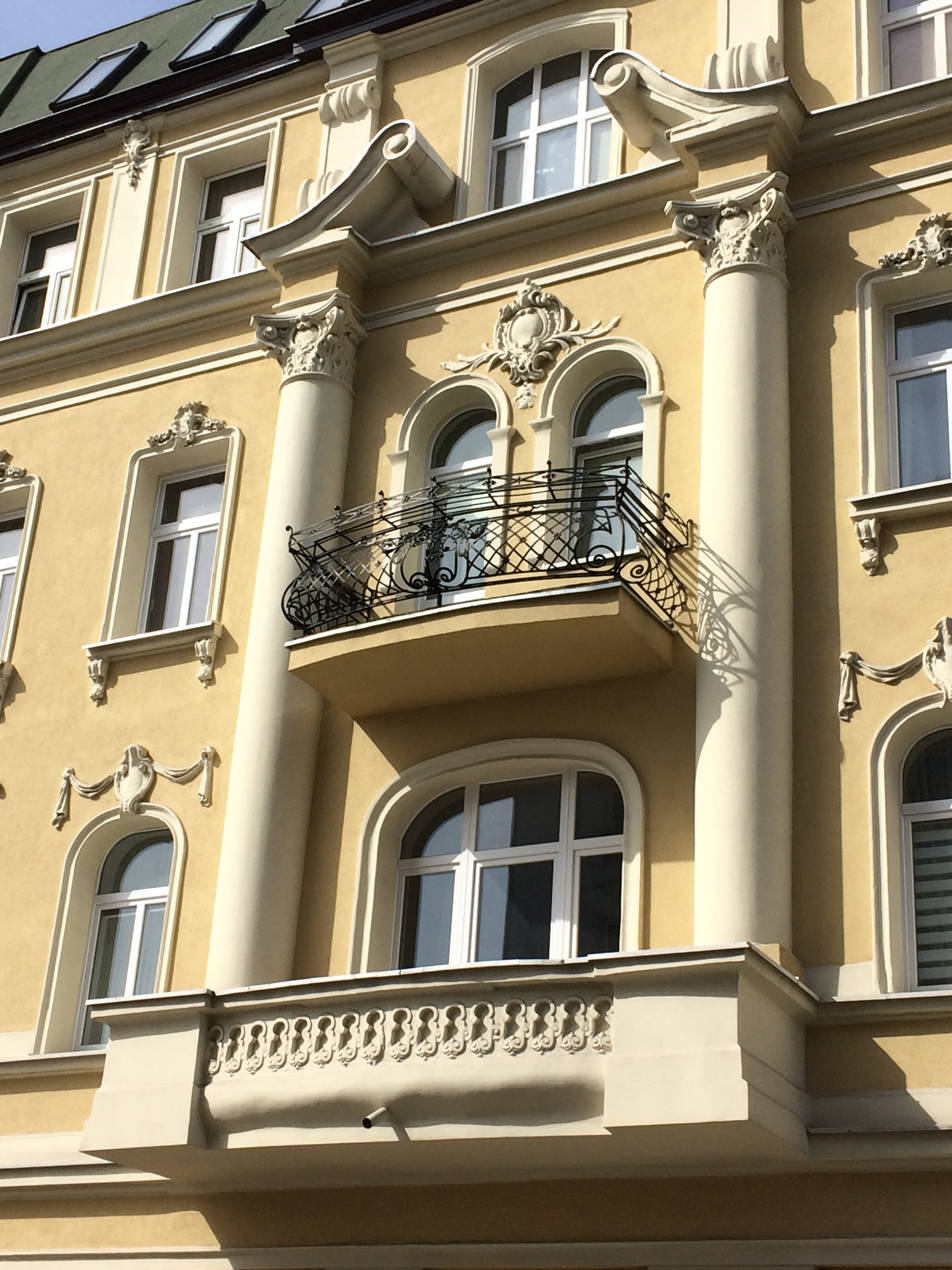
Detail of columns and balcony

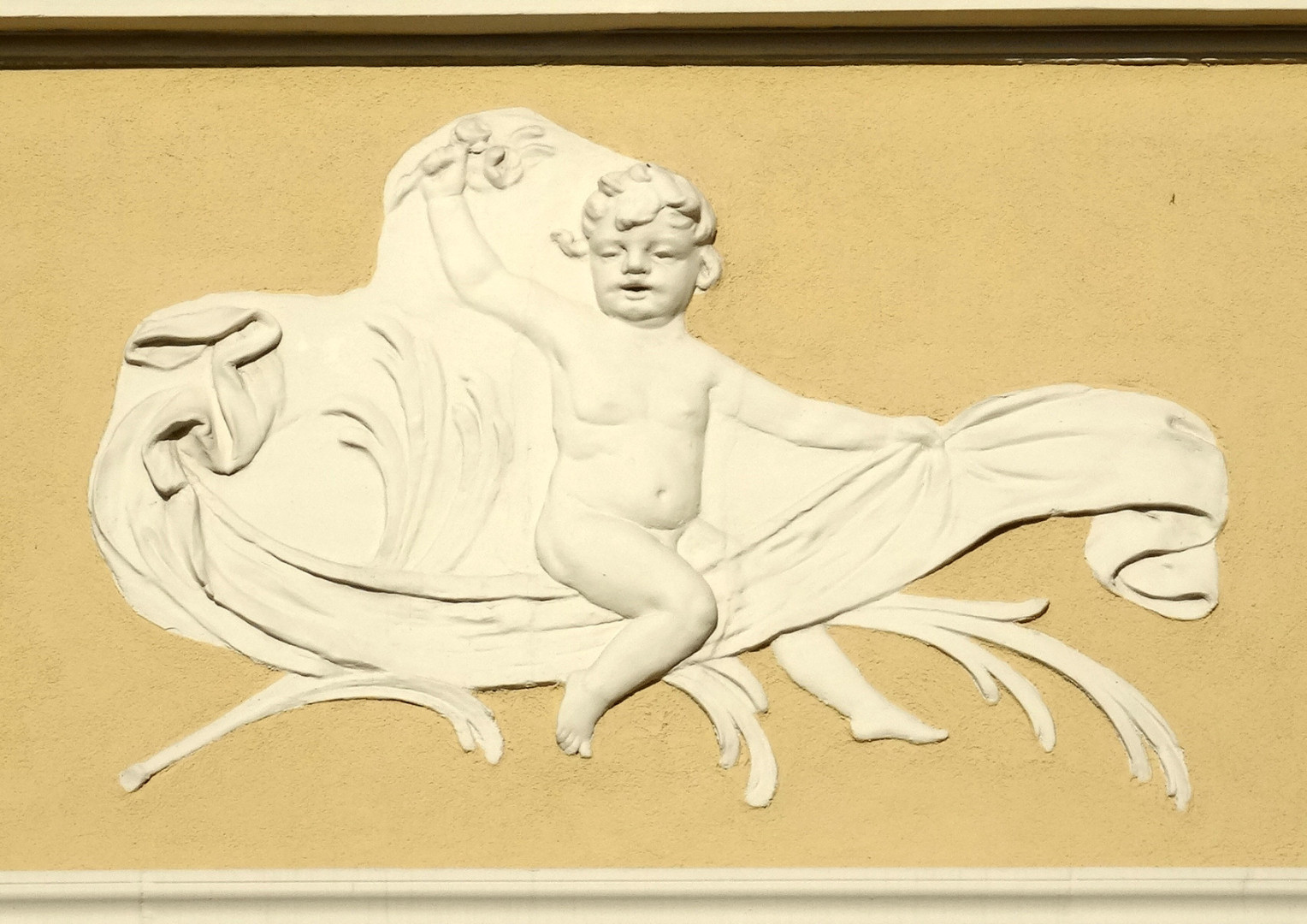
Putto

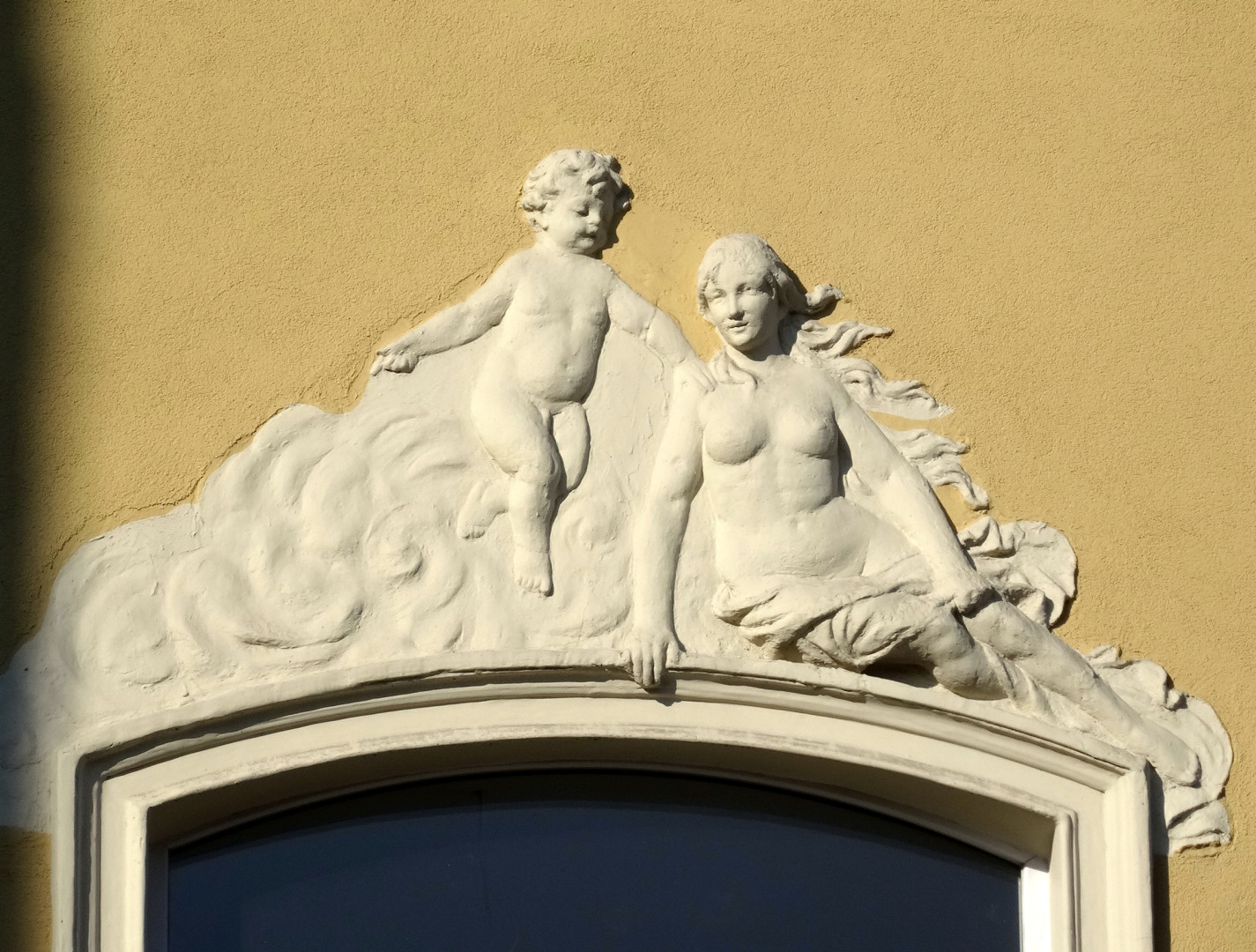
Cupid and Demeter

=== Tenement at 37, corner with Kwiatowa street ===
1885

Eclecticism

Its first landlord was Julius Baumann, registered as a blacksmith.

The building has been renovated in 2020.

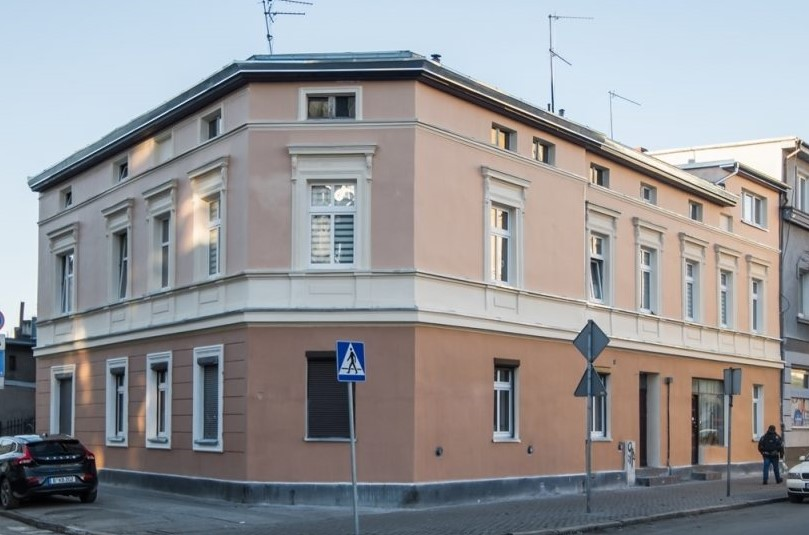
Corner view

=== Methodist church, at 41 ===
Registered on Kuyavian-Pomeranian Voivodeship heritage list, Nr. A/805, on 16 September 1989. Nr.601240, Reg. September 9, 1989

1883

Historicism & Neo-Gothic

The Evangelical Methodist Church is a 19th century parish church.

The church has appreciable acoustics and its decor and furnishings made it considered as the most modern among the Polish Methodist Churches.

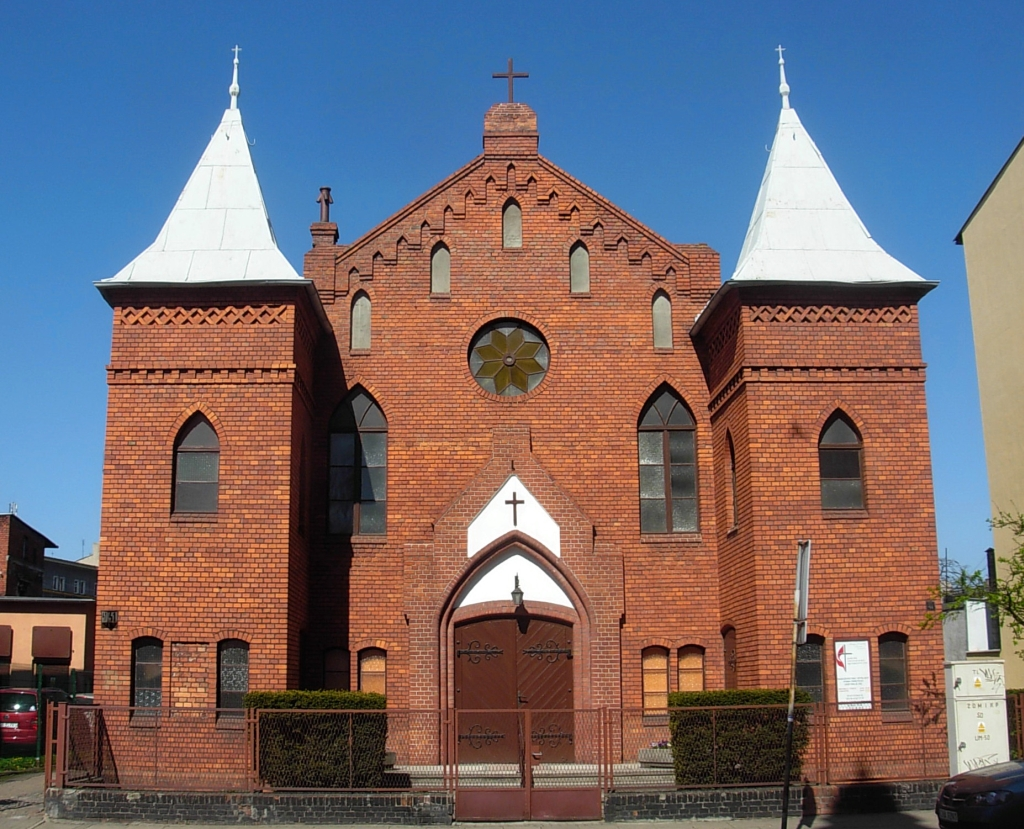
Main elevation from Cieszkowskiego Street

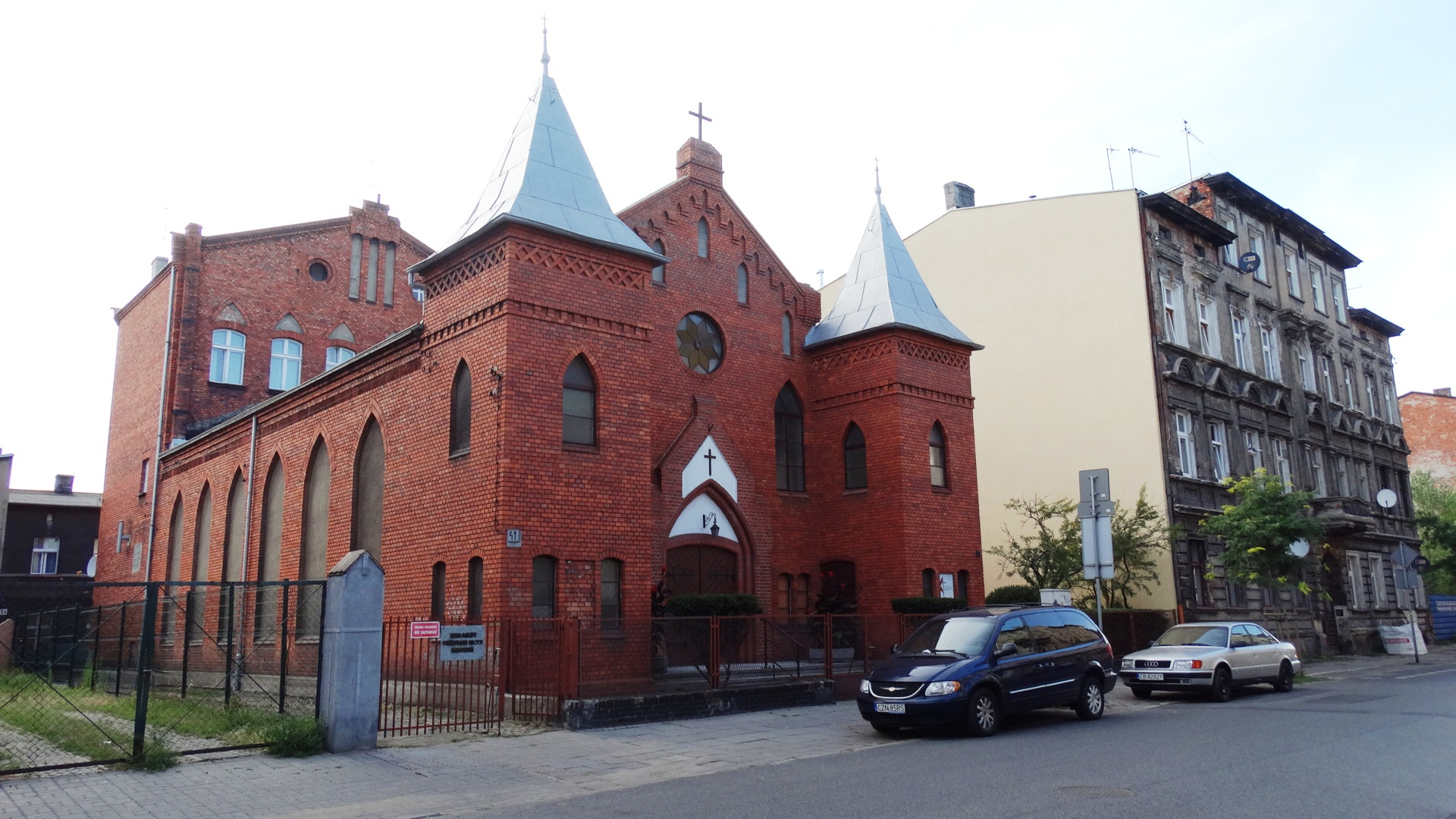
Side view

=== Tenement at 42 ===
1910

Art Nouveau

Initial address was Rinkauerstraße 49/50. The actual facade dates back to the period when Johannes Cornelius, an architect and mason, owned the building.

The main elevation is typical from the Art Nouveau style. It even recalls other buildings constructed at the same period in Bydgoszcz, such as at Dworcowa Street 45 and 47, realized by Erich Lindenburger.

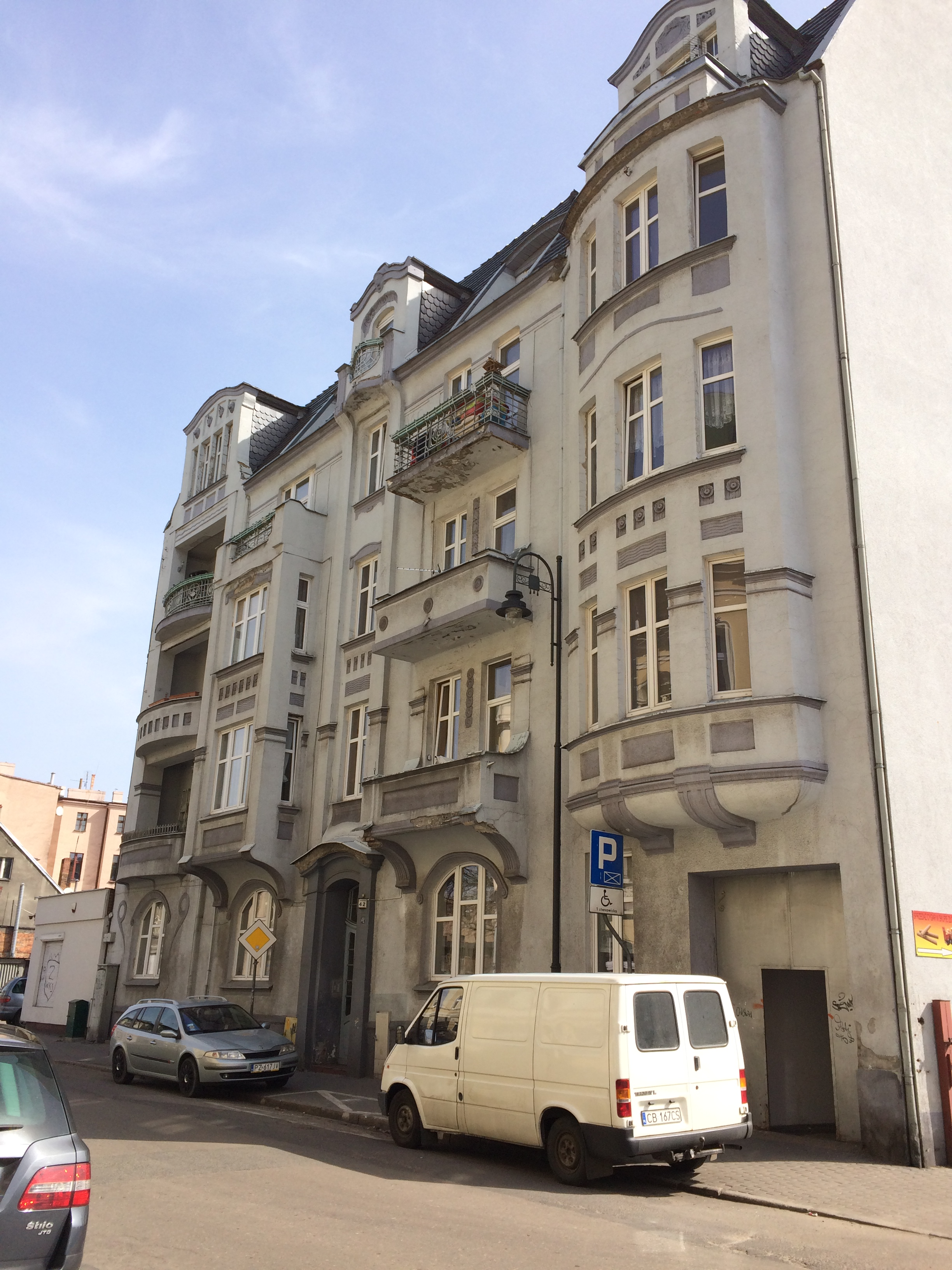
Main elevation

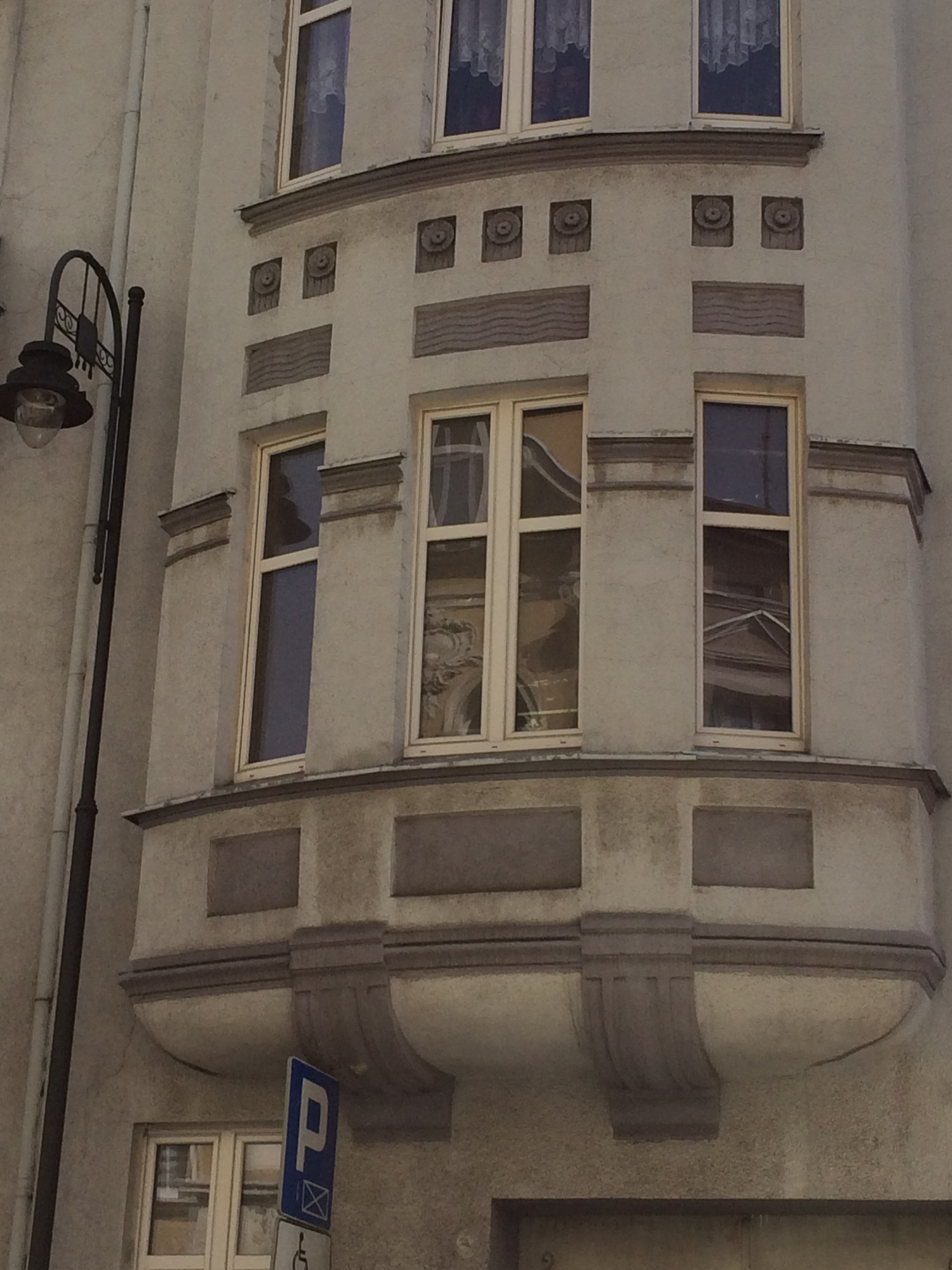
Bay window

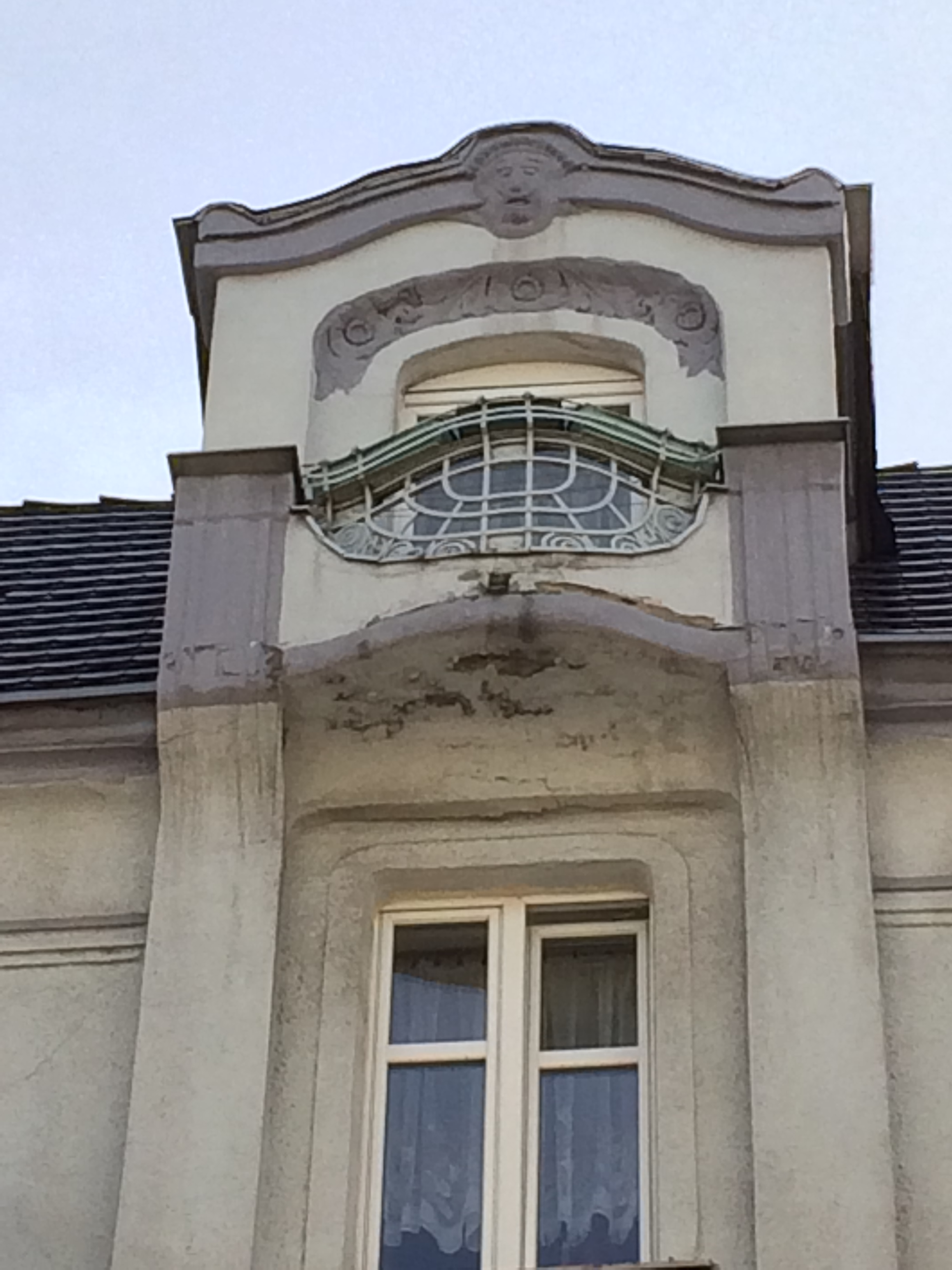
Balcony detail

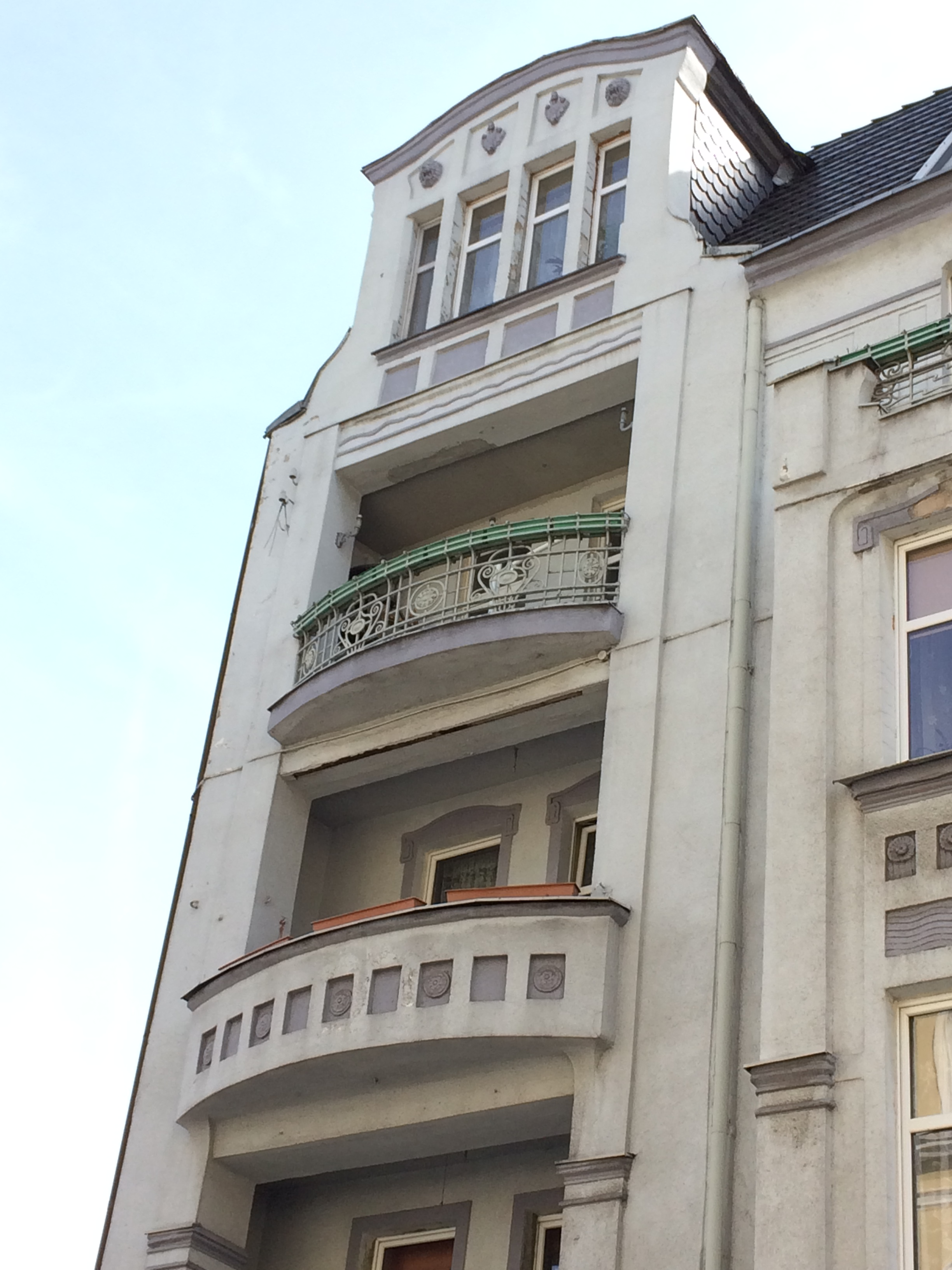
Detail of bay window

=== Tenement at 43 ===
1895

Eclecticism

Initial address was Rinkauerstraße 27, the building was the property of Heinrich Zacharias until the turn of the 20th century. He used the building as a renting place, but did not live there.

The main elevation, though very damaged, still displays a heavy balcony above the main gate, flanked by pilasters with beautiful capitals. First floor windows are pedimented with various motifs, on the second level, a bearded figure crowns the balcony.

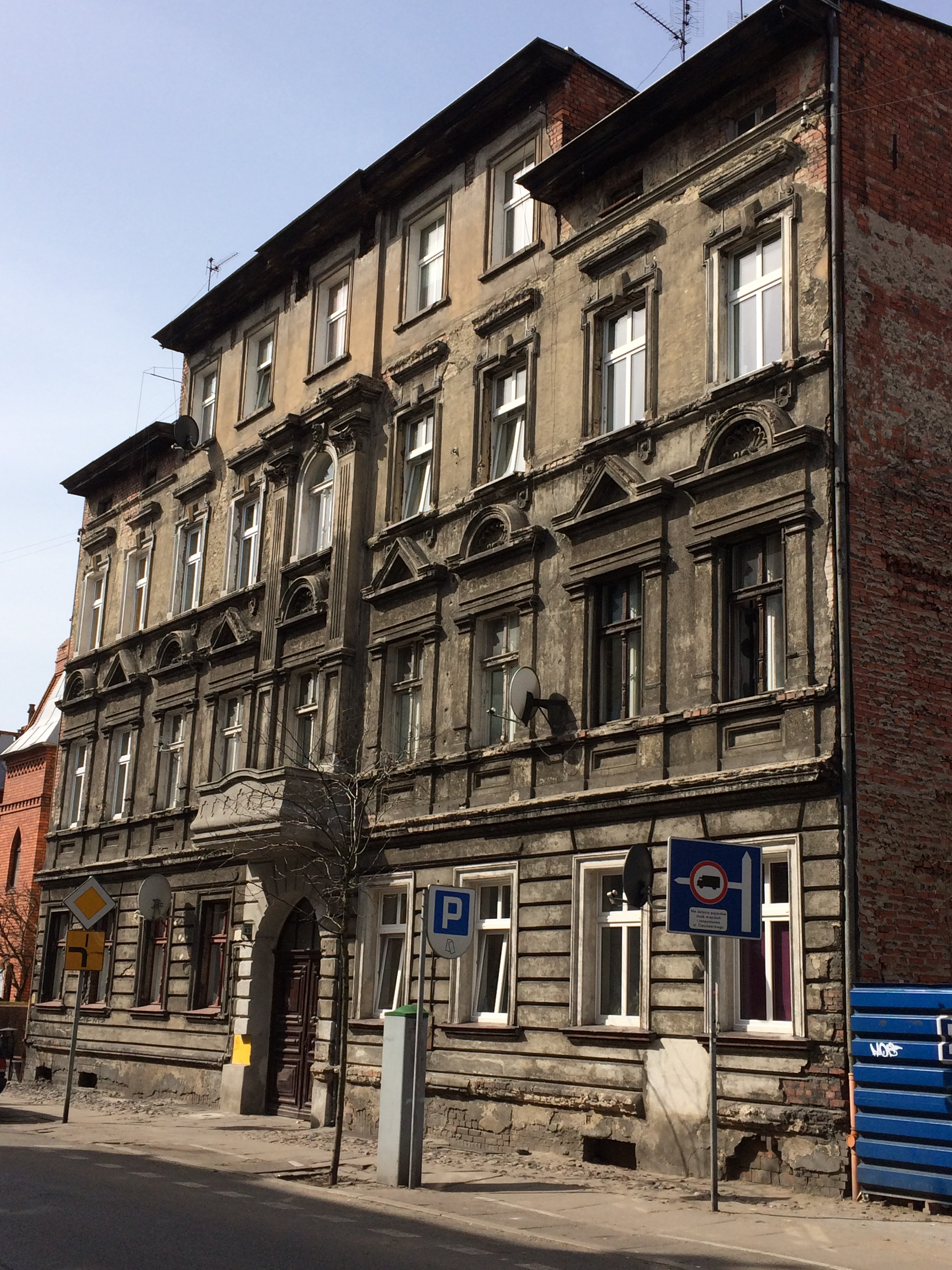
Main elevation

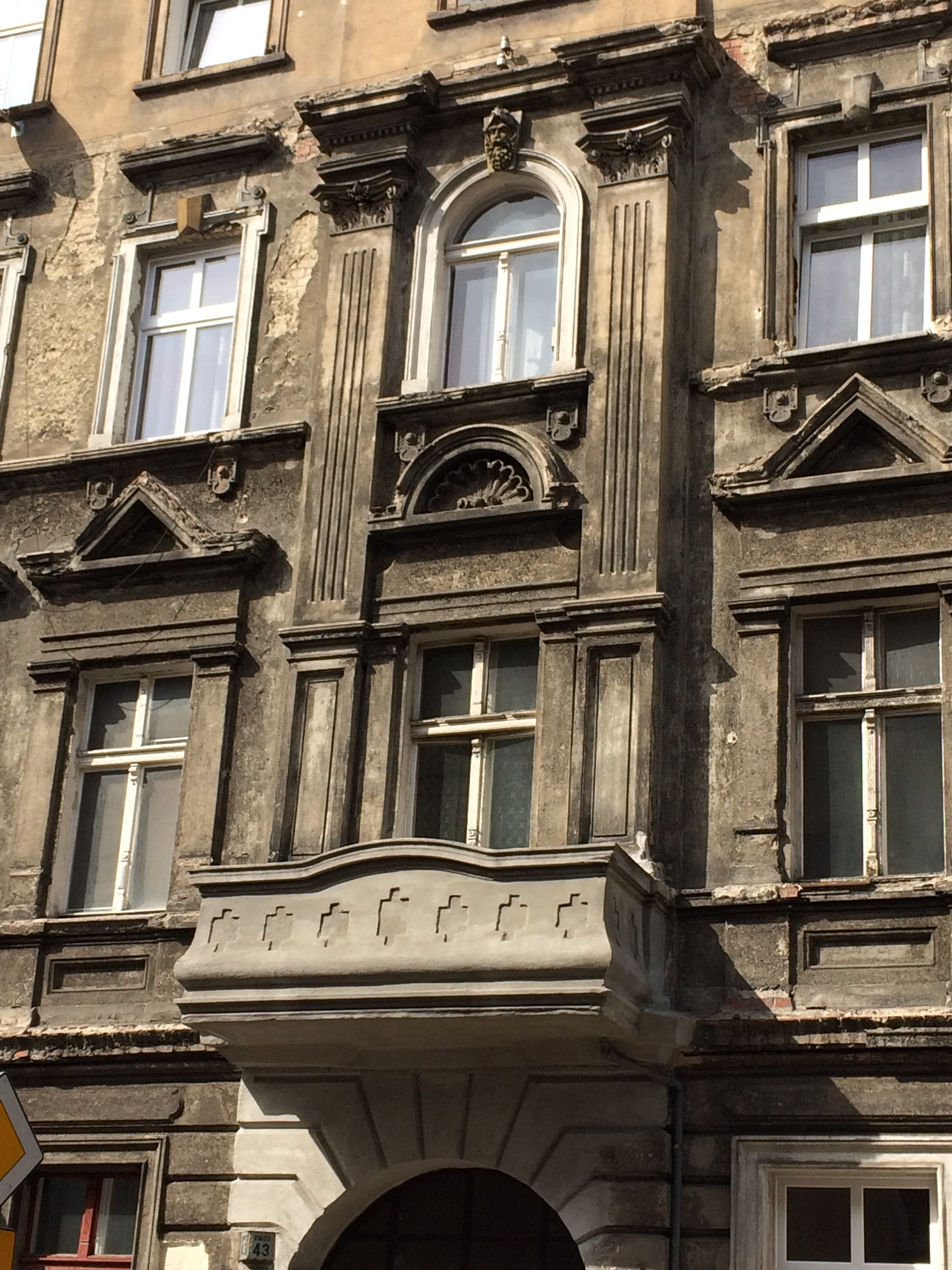
Facade balcony

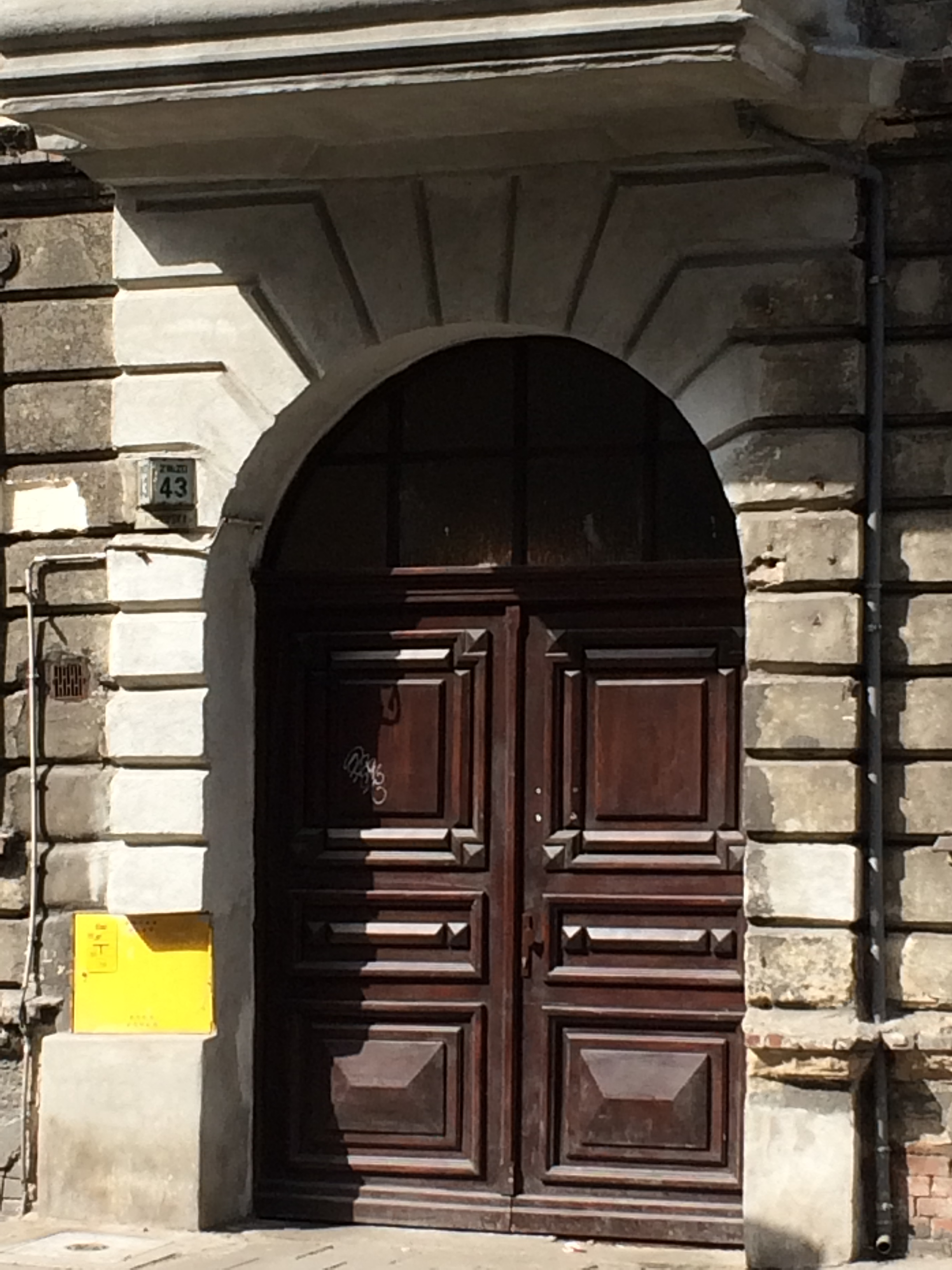
Main gate

=== Tenement at 47 ===
1891

Eclecticism, Neoclassical architecture

Initial address was Rinkauerstraße 29, the building was the property of Gustav Stöckmann, a carpenter. It then moved in the hands of a shoemaker, Michael Löper.

The main elevation, boasts nice motifs, such as a light avant-corps that underlines the symmetry of the facade, several pediments on windows, bossages, and a main gate topped by ornaments embracing a coat of arms.

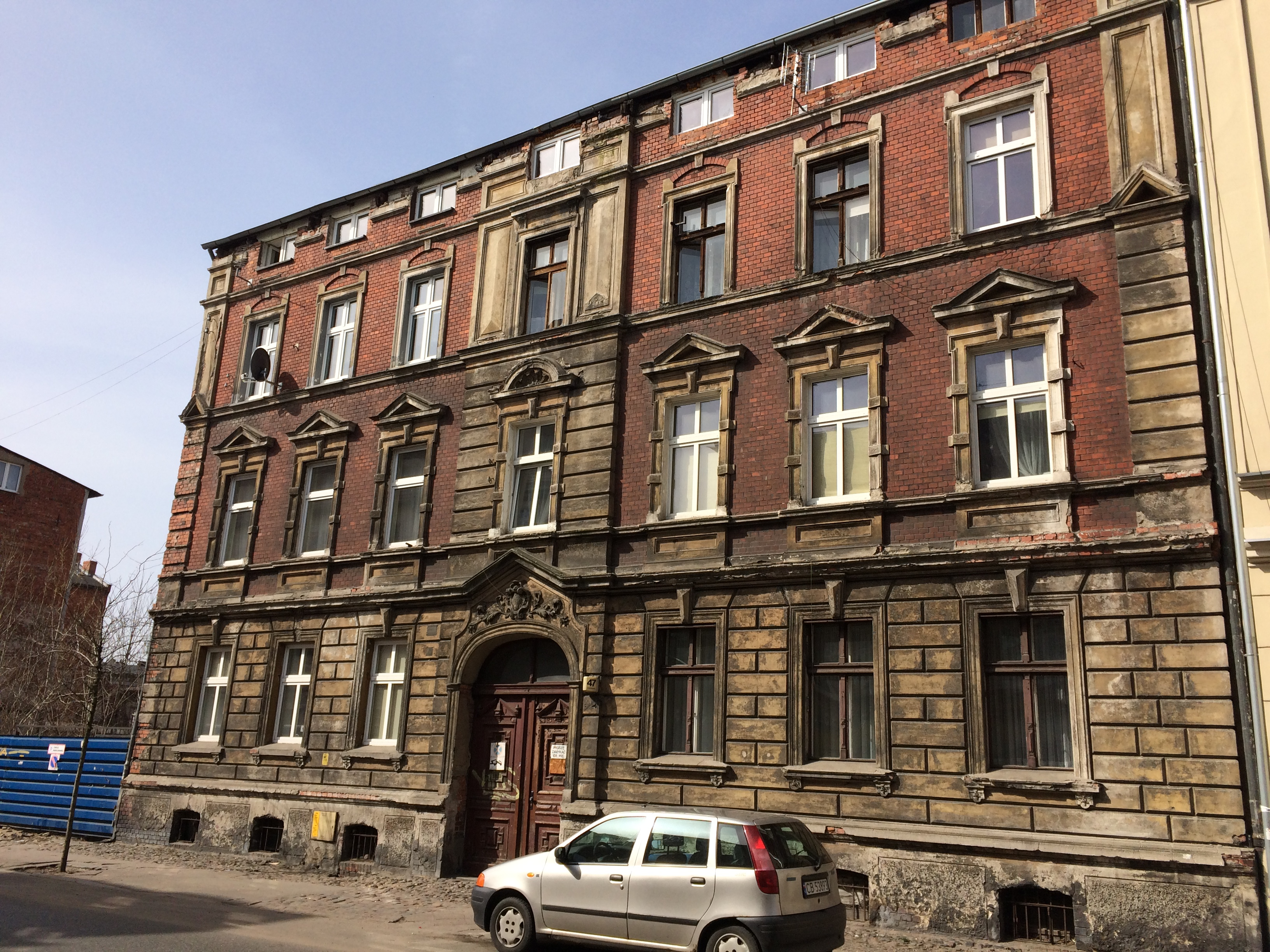
Main elevation

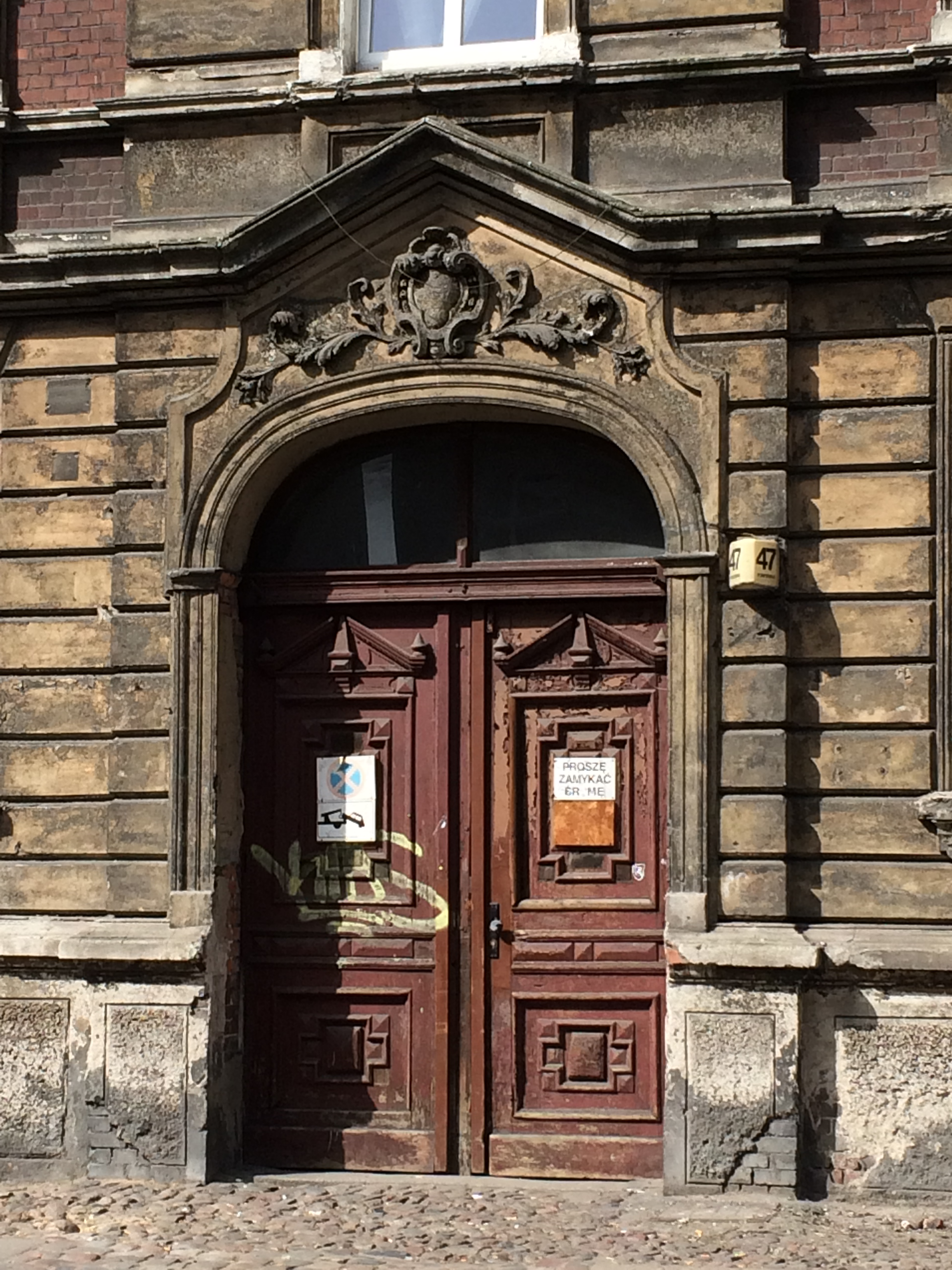
Main gate

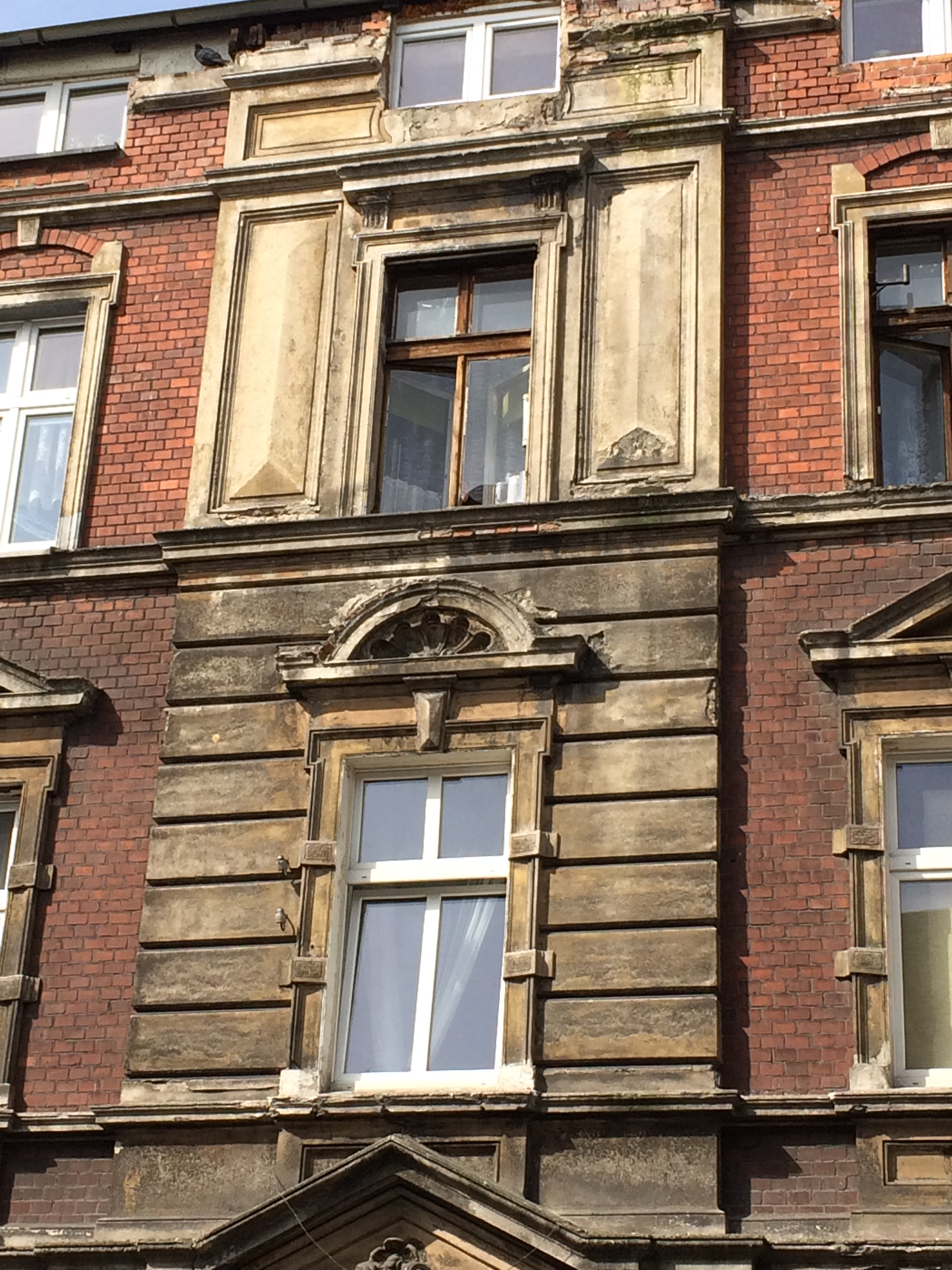
Frontage detail

=== Tenement at 48, corner house with Cieszkowski Street ===
Registered on Kuyavian-Pomeranian Voivodeship heritage list, Nr.601398-Reg.A/1099, May 4, 1994

1896–1897, by Józef Święcicki and Anton Hoffmann

Eclecticism, forms of Neo-Renaissance & Neo-Baroque

The first building on the plot dates back to the 1870s. In 1896, has been erected a designed, new, grander tenement, commissioned by the rentier and real estate dealer Gustav Reschke (who already commissioned buildings at 11 and 17 Cieszkowskiego Street). The ground floor was devoted to retail stores and the rest was a four-storey apartment.

A full revitalization of the house, bringing back the original facade appearance with its reconstructed architectural details and original colors, has been carried out in 1993–1994.

The four-storey building has a "L" shape with bay windows and balconies on the first and second floor. The front elevation is symmetrical, with regularly laid out architectural decoration. Some of the first floor windows are flanked by Ionic pilasters. Second floor windows are topped with stylized acanthus pediments. The ensemble has been renovated in 2021.

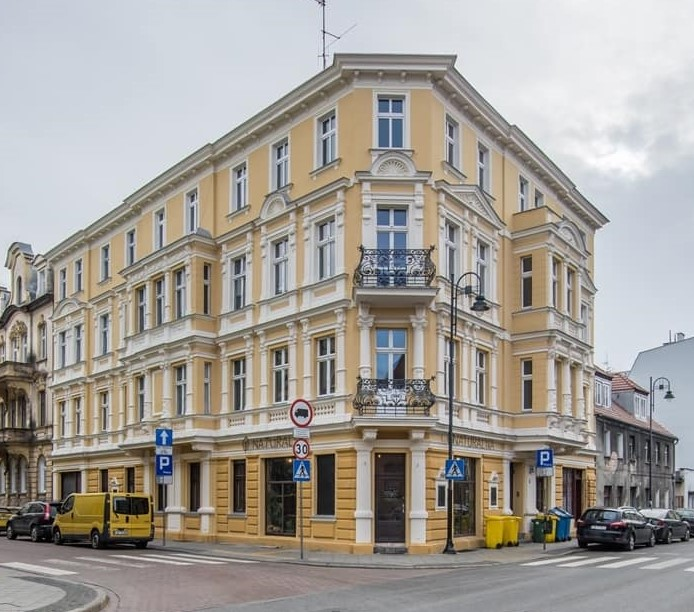
Corner house view of both renovated facades

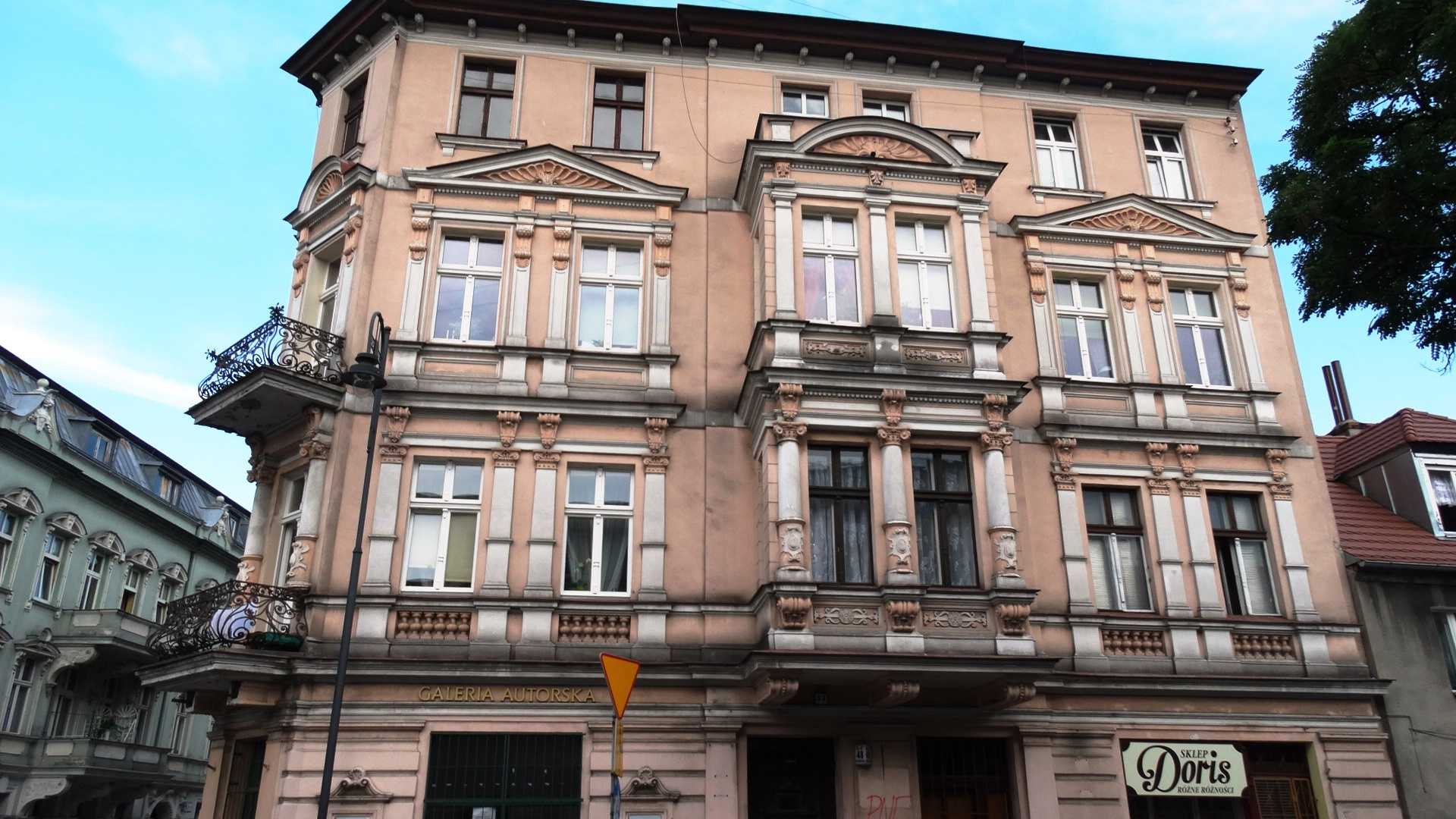
Elevation on Pomorska Street

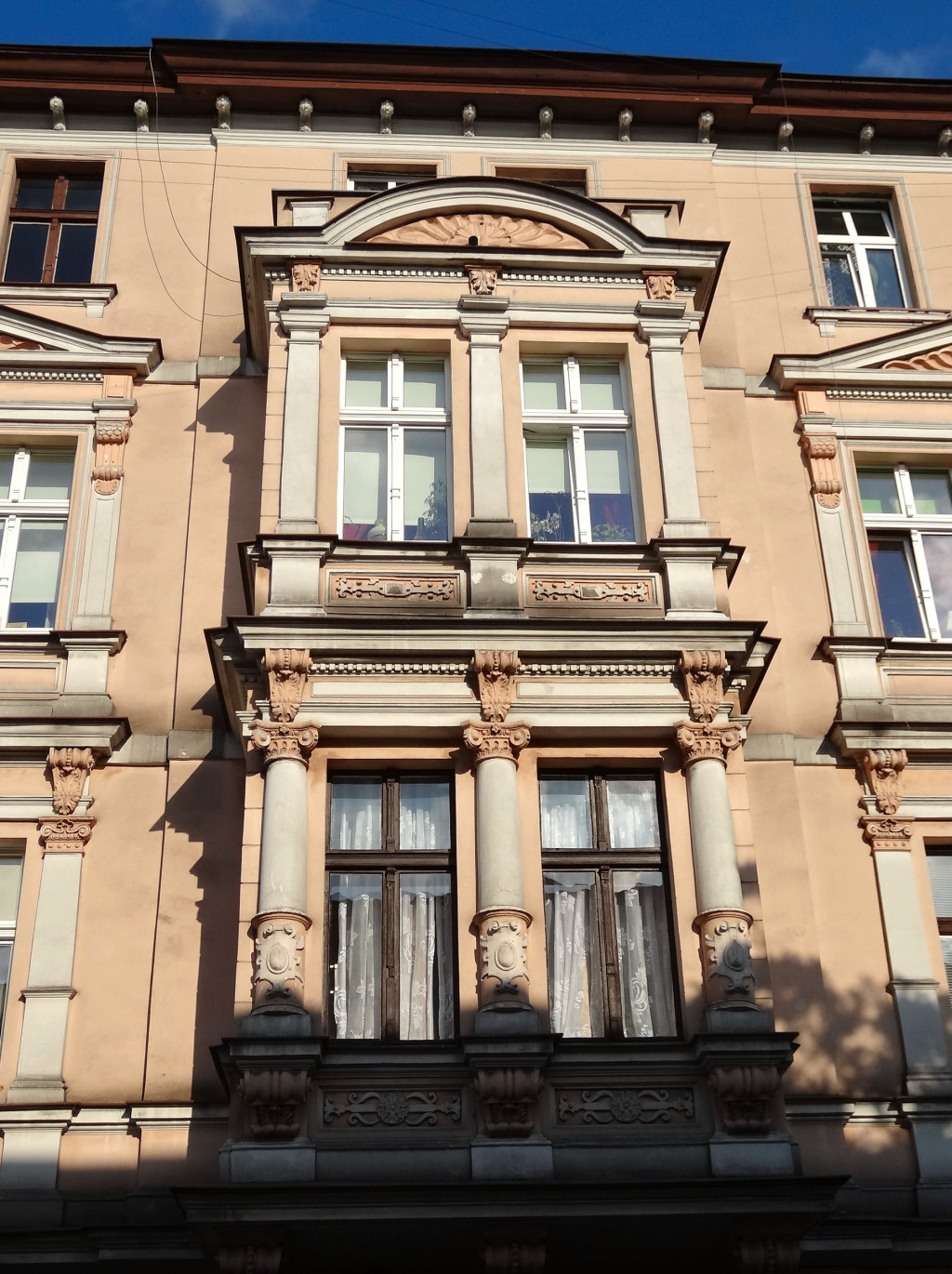
Bay window detail

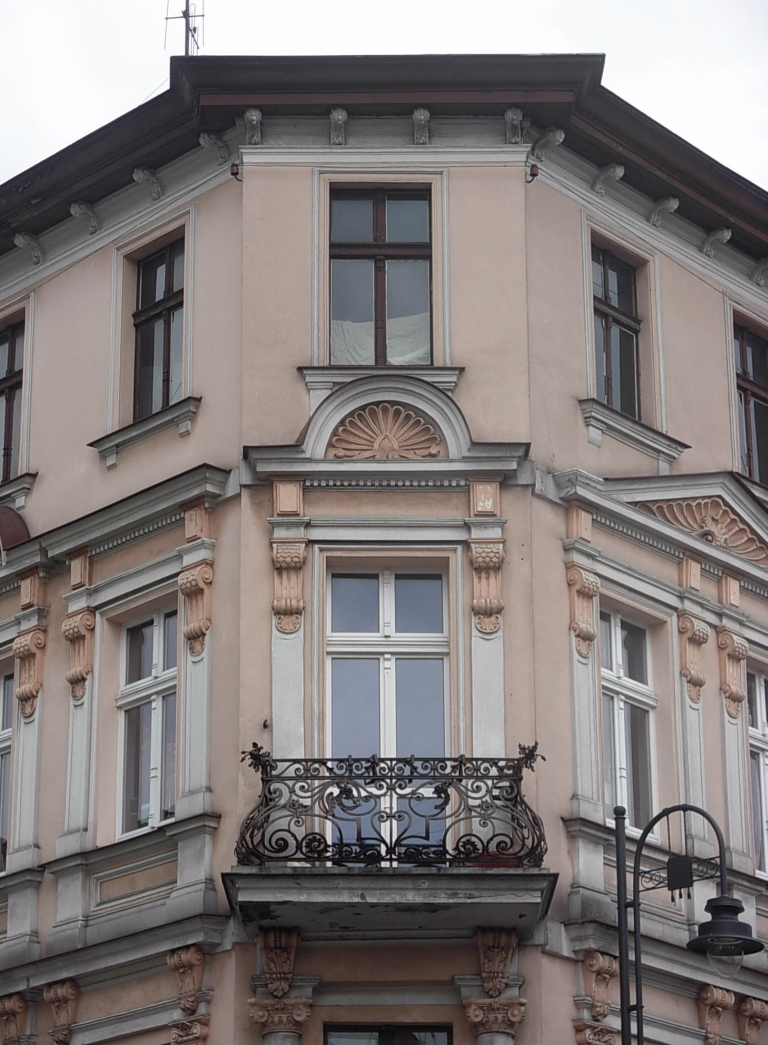
Detail of balcony

=== Tenement at 49 ===
1891

Eclecticism, Neoclassical architecture

Initial address was Rinkauerstraße 30, the property was owned by the municipality, as Bromberg city apartments (German: Wohnungsverein gehörig). This system prevailed, even after Bydgoszcz re-integrated the Polish territory.

The facade of the building, recently renovated, displays typical neoclassical features: rows of symmetrical windows and moderation in the decoration.

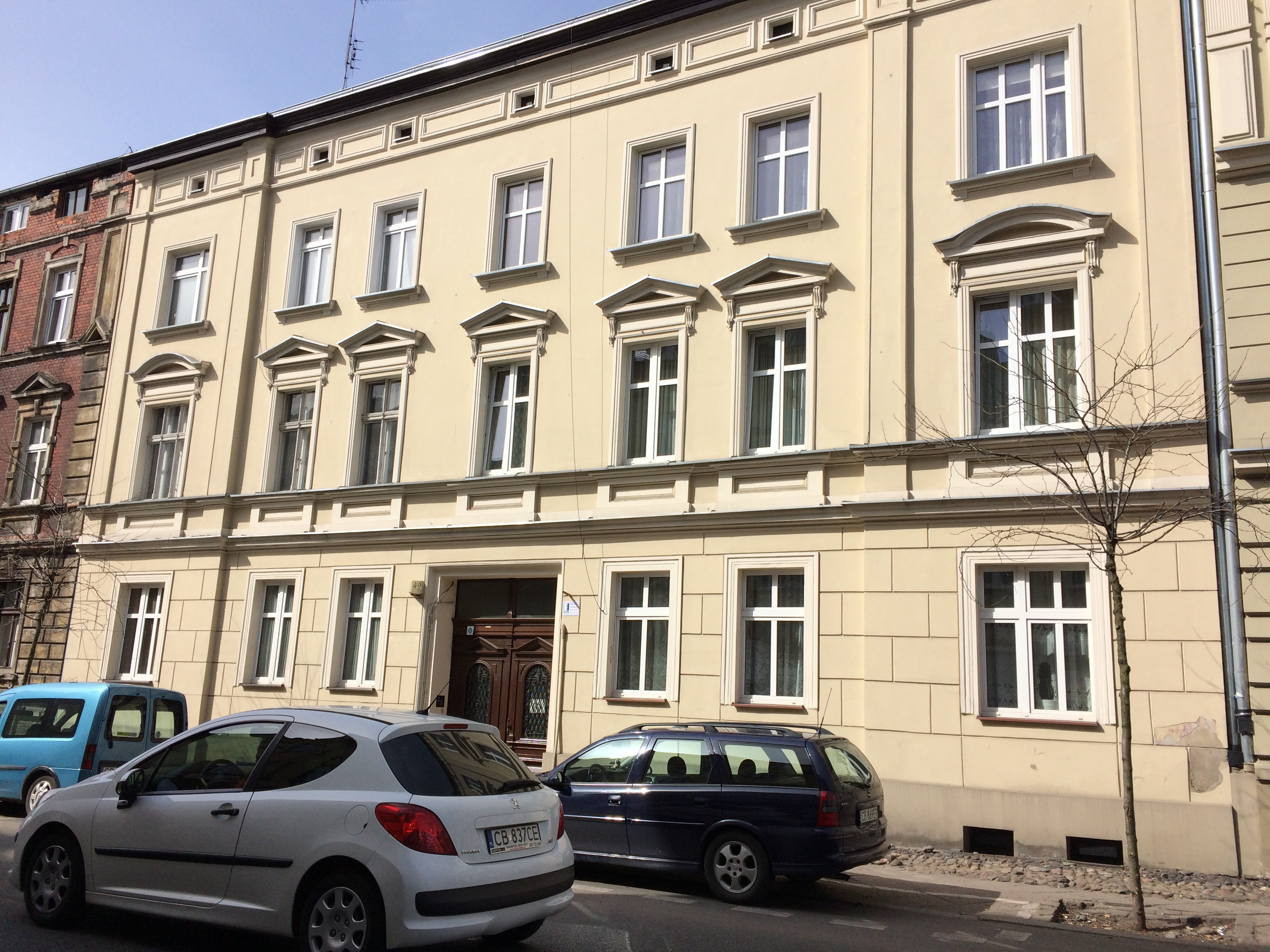
Front elevation

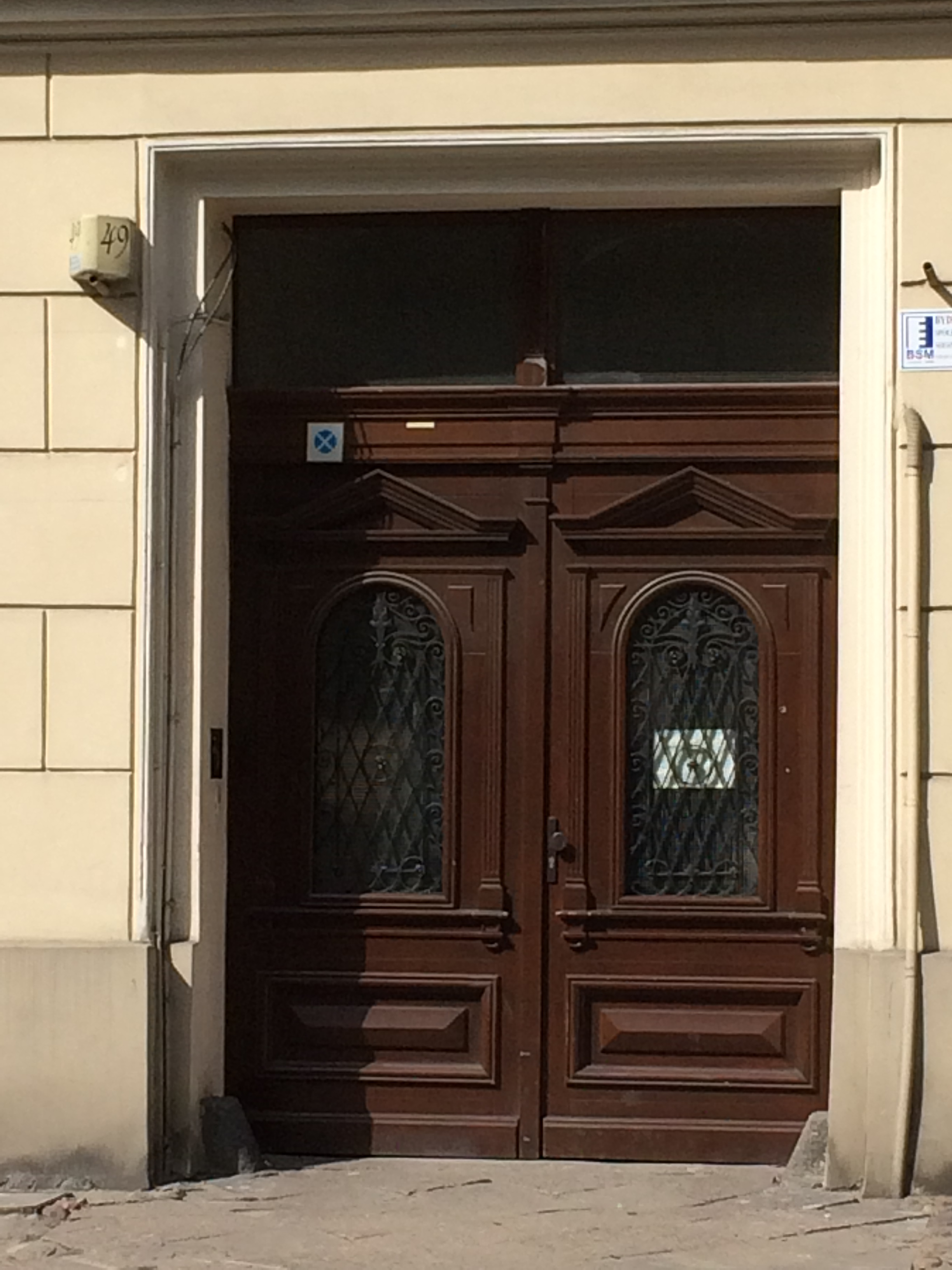
Main gate

=== Tenement at 50, corner house with Cieszkowski Street ===
Registered on Kuyavian-Pomeranian Voivodeship heritage list, Nr.601399-Reg.A/1051, December 8, 1997

1898–1899, by Fritz Weidner

Eclecticism, forms of picturesque architecture & Neo-Baroque

The first building on the plot dates back to the 1870s. The actual tenement was commissioned by Wilhelmin Wiemer, owner of the lot at Rinkauerstraße 44. Finally, for financial disputes, the project has been carried out by Karl Bergner in place of Weidner. The construction of the building was completed in 1899. The ground floor was devoted to shopping and restoration retail and upper floors for housing. On October 11, 1936, Richard Klewin, a dentist, acquired the building. During the communist era the building housed the restaurant "Gromada", and since 2000, restaurant "Pierogarnia pod Aniołami" ("Dumpling Under the Angels"), run by Caritas association for Bydgoszcz Diocese. The facade has undergone a full overhaul in 1994.

The three-storey building has a "U" shape footprint with a beveled corner. The corner elevation displays an avant-corps as well as the facade onto Cieszkiewski street, which is also enriched with a two-storey bay window. The corner, capped by a spired roof lantern, is flanked on the top with triangular gables with dormer windows. The second floor bay-window is an open arcaded loggia supported by Ionic columns.

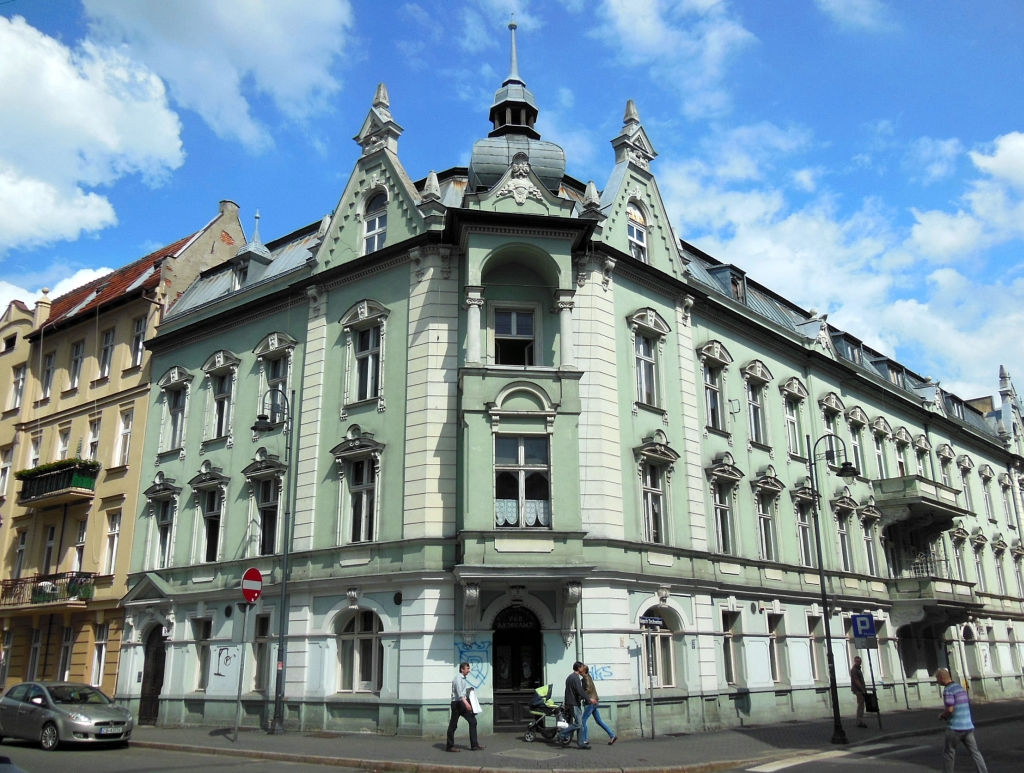
Corner house view of both facades

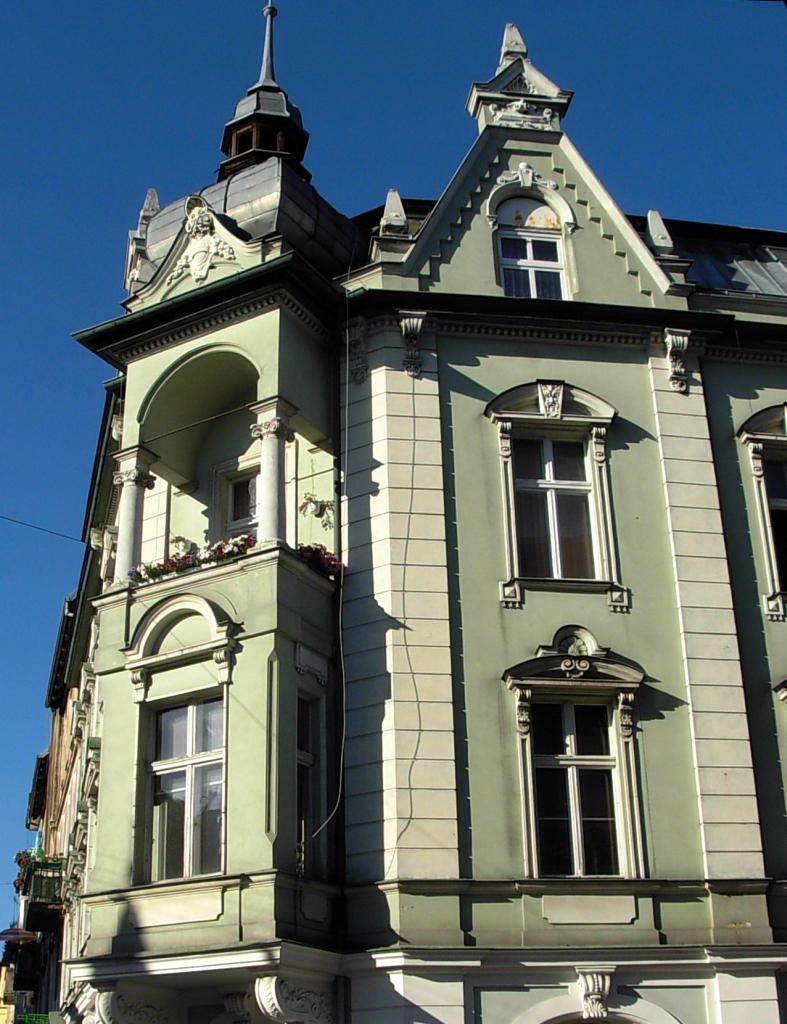
Bay window and loggia

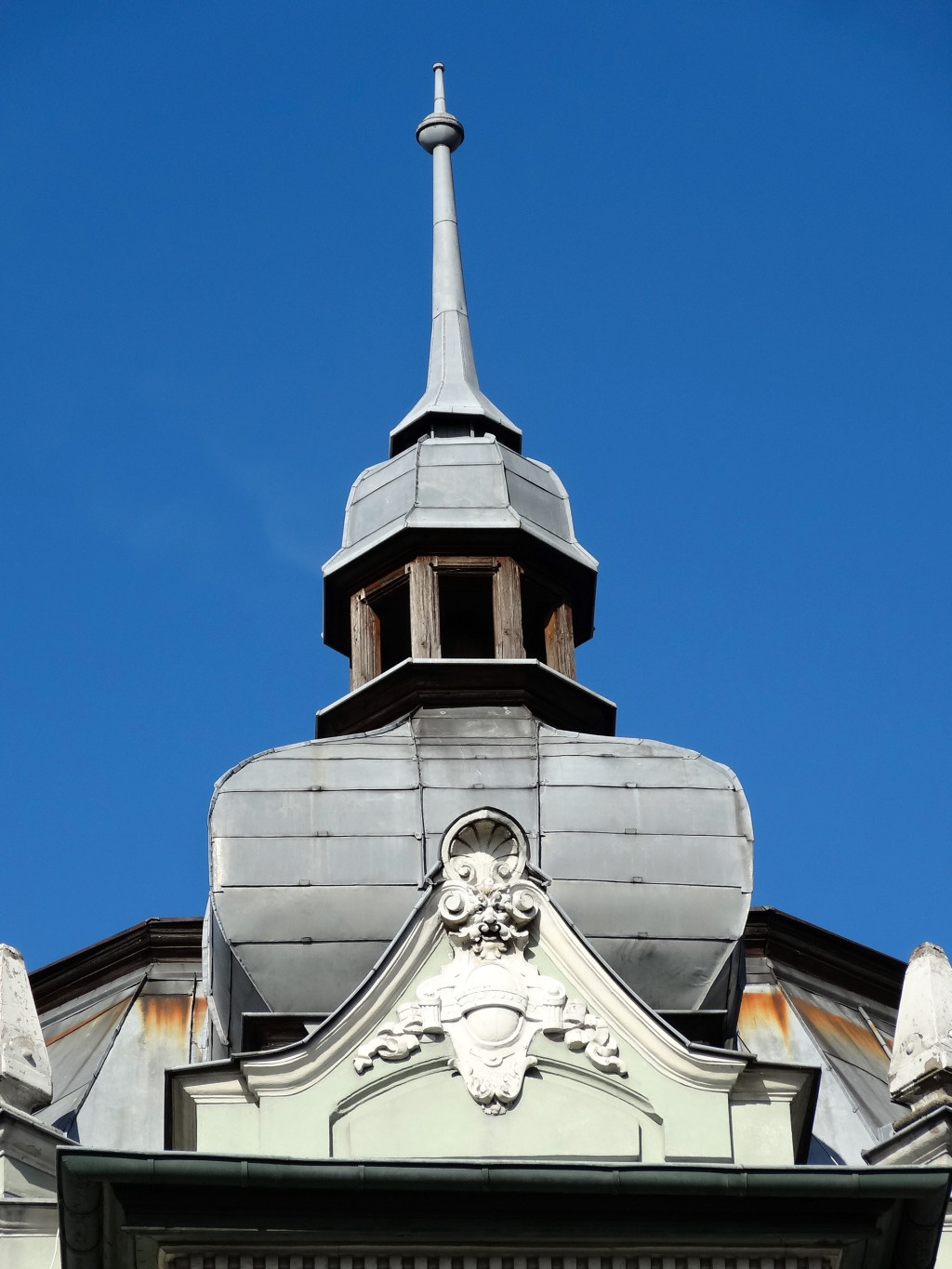
Detail of roof lantern

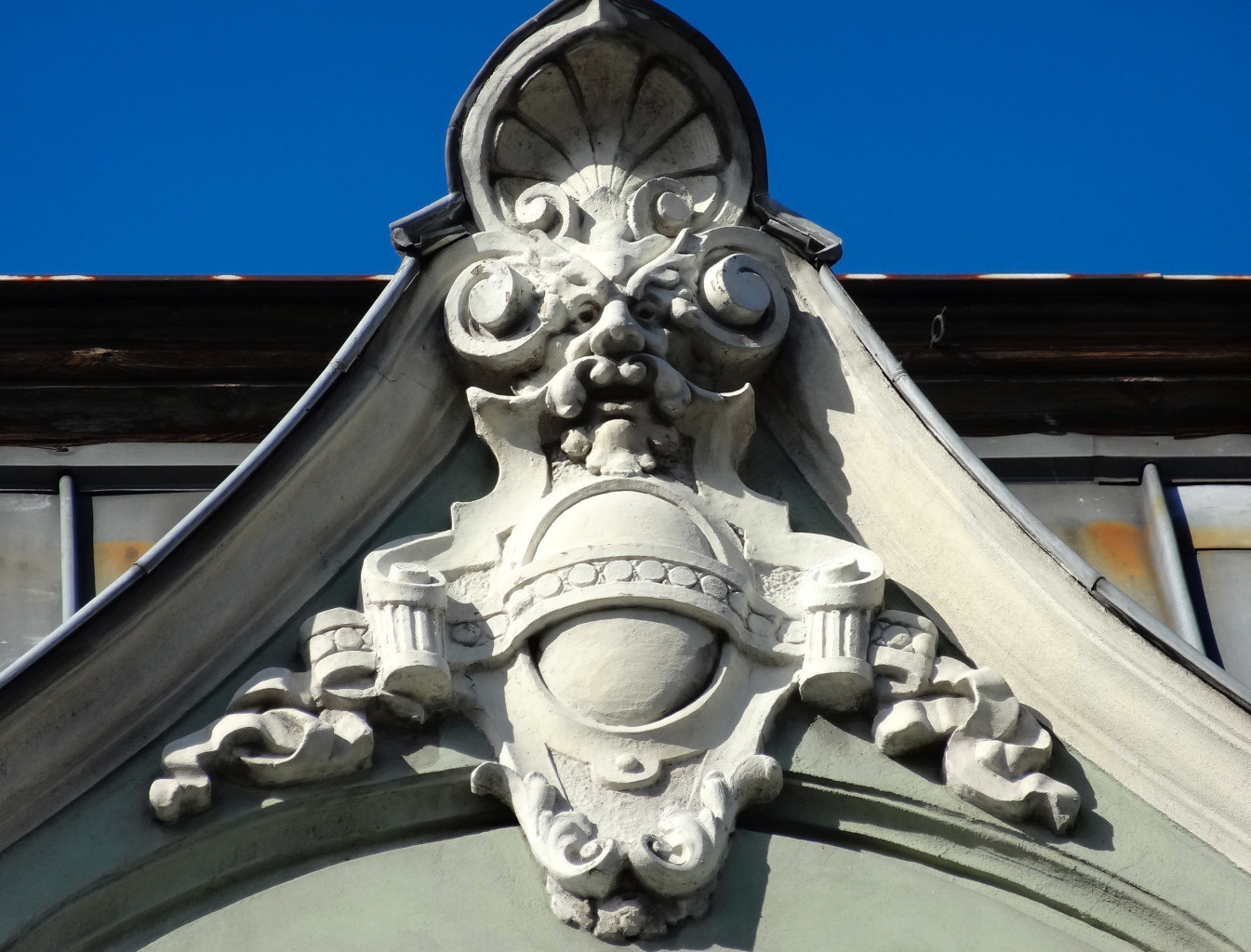
Detail of a figure

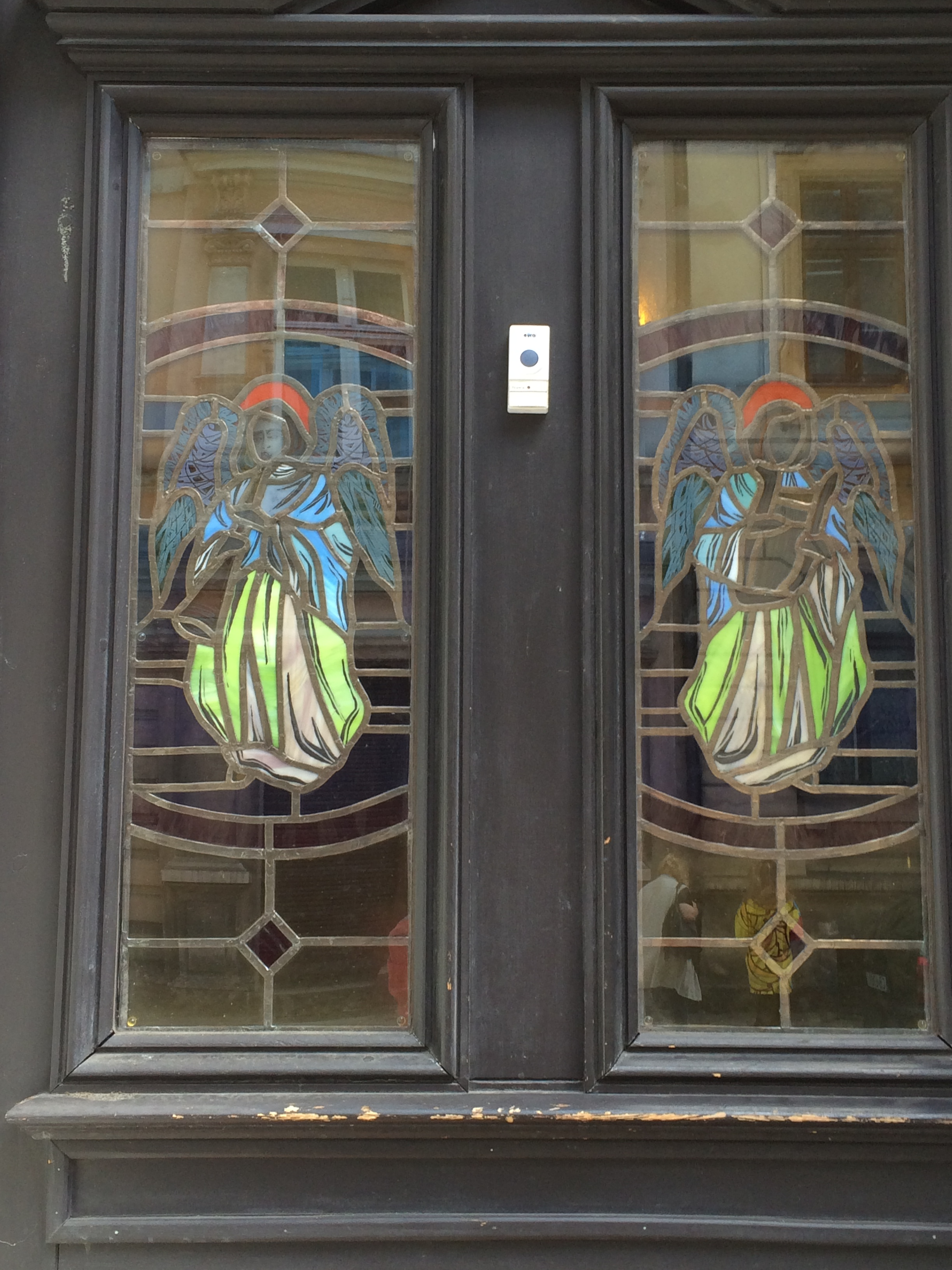
Door of Nr.50

=== Tenement at 51, corner with Mazowiecka street ===
1890–1891

Eclecticism, Neoclassical architecture

Initial address was Heinestraße 45, like the tenement at Nr.49, this building was initially the property of the municipality, as Bromberg city apartments (German: Wohnungsverein gehörig). This system prevailed, even after Bydgoszcz re-integrated the Polish territory.

The facade of the building, recently renovated, displays nice neoclassical features, mirroring the abutting tenement at Nr.49, with a bit more motifs: pilasters, tympanum on Mazowiecka street and a corner facade with balustrade, topped by round ornaments.

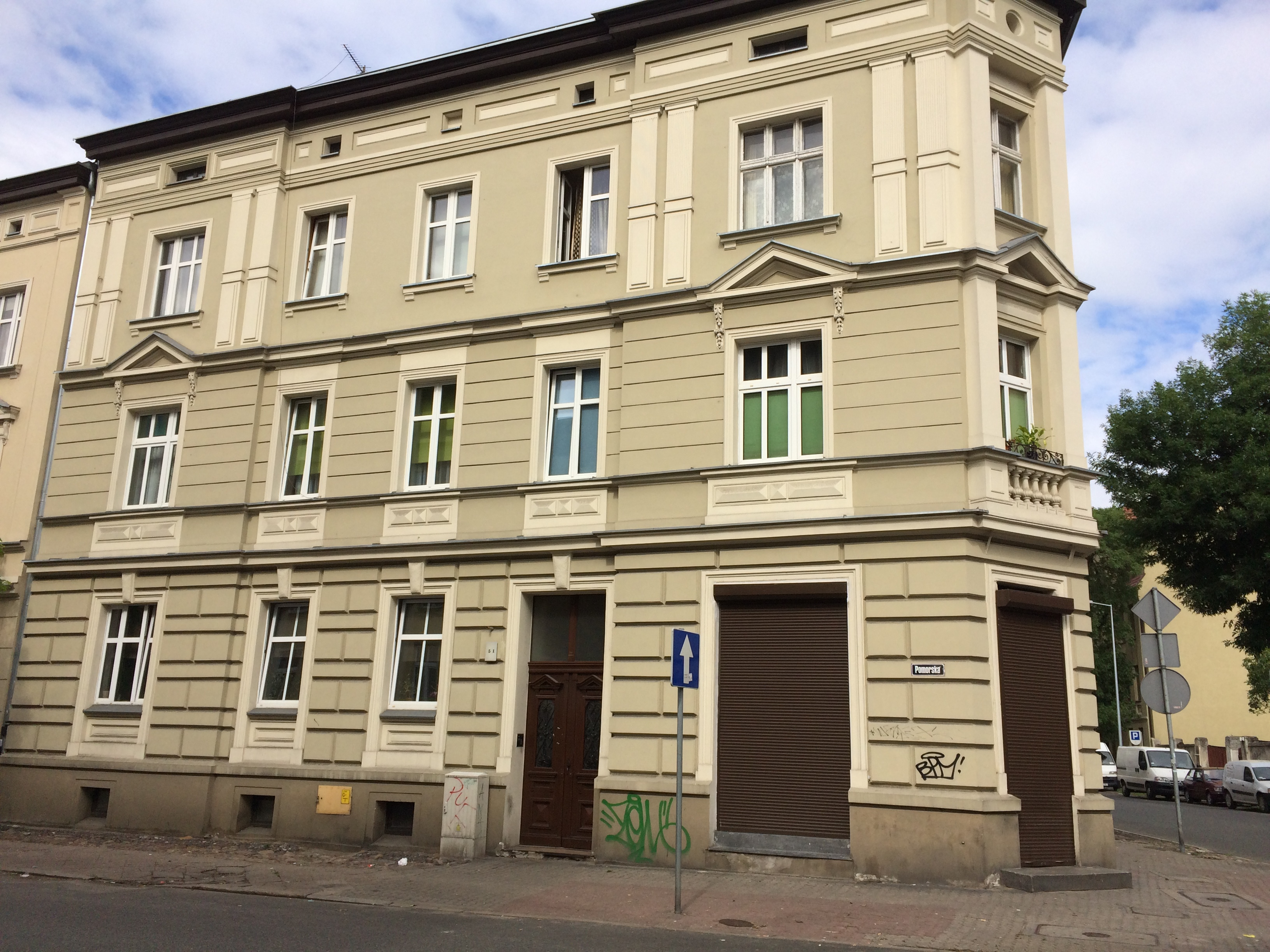
Facade on Pomorska street

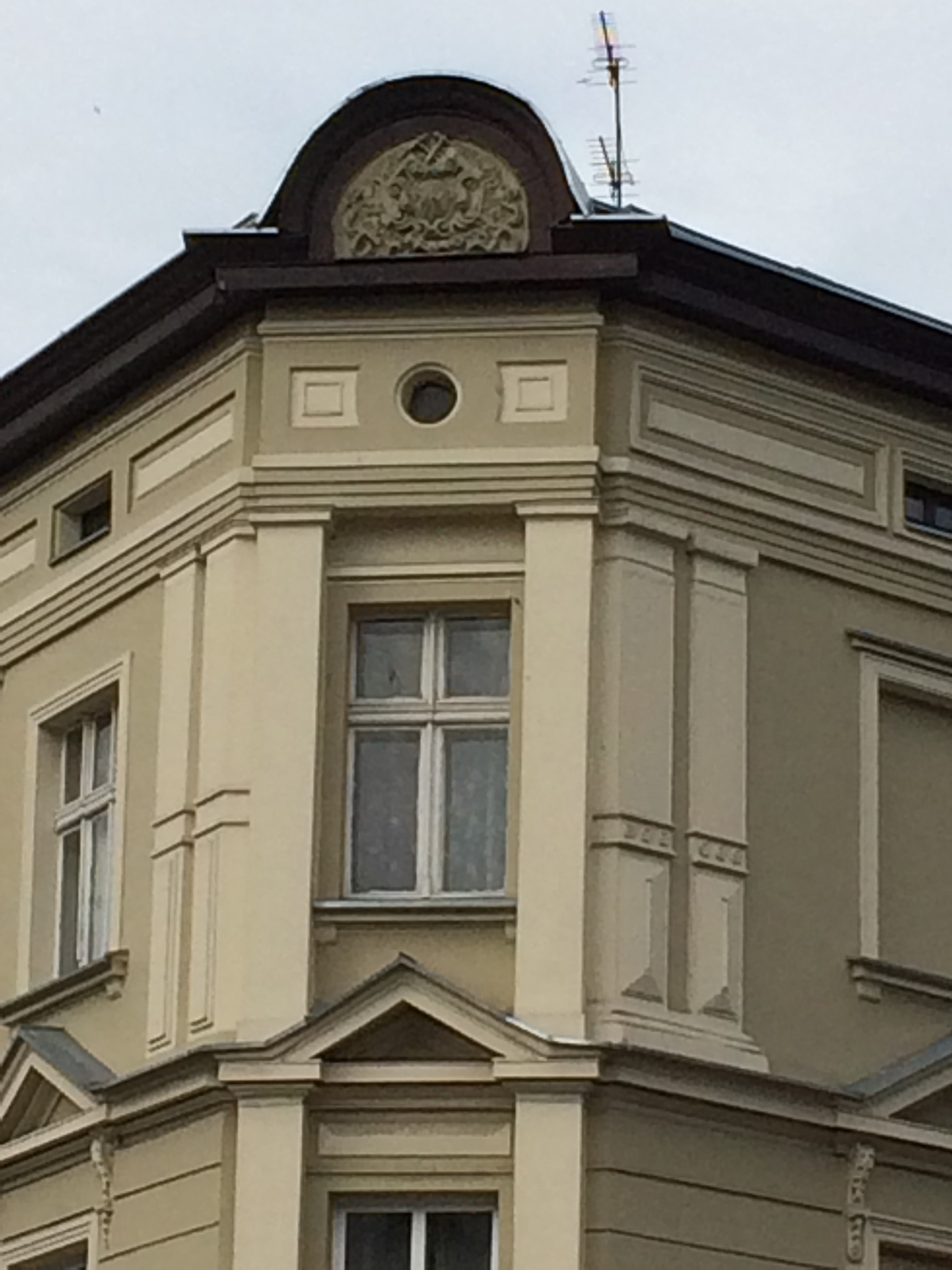
Corner detail

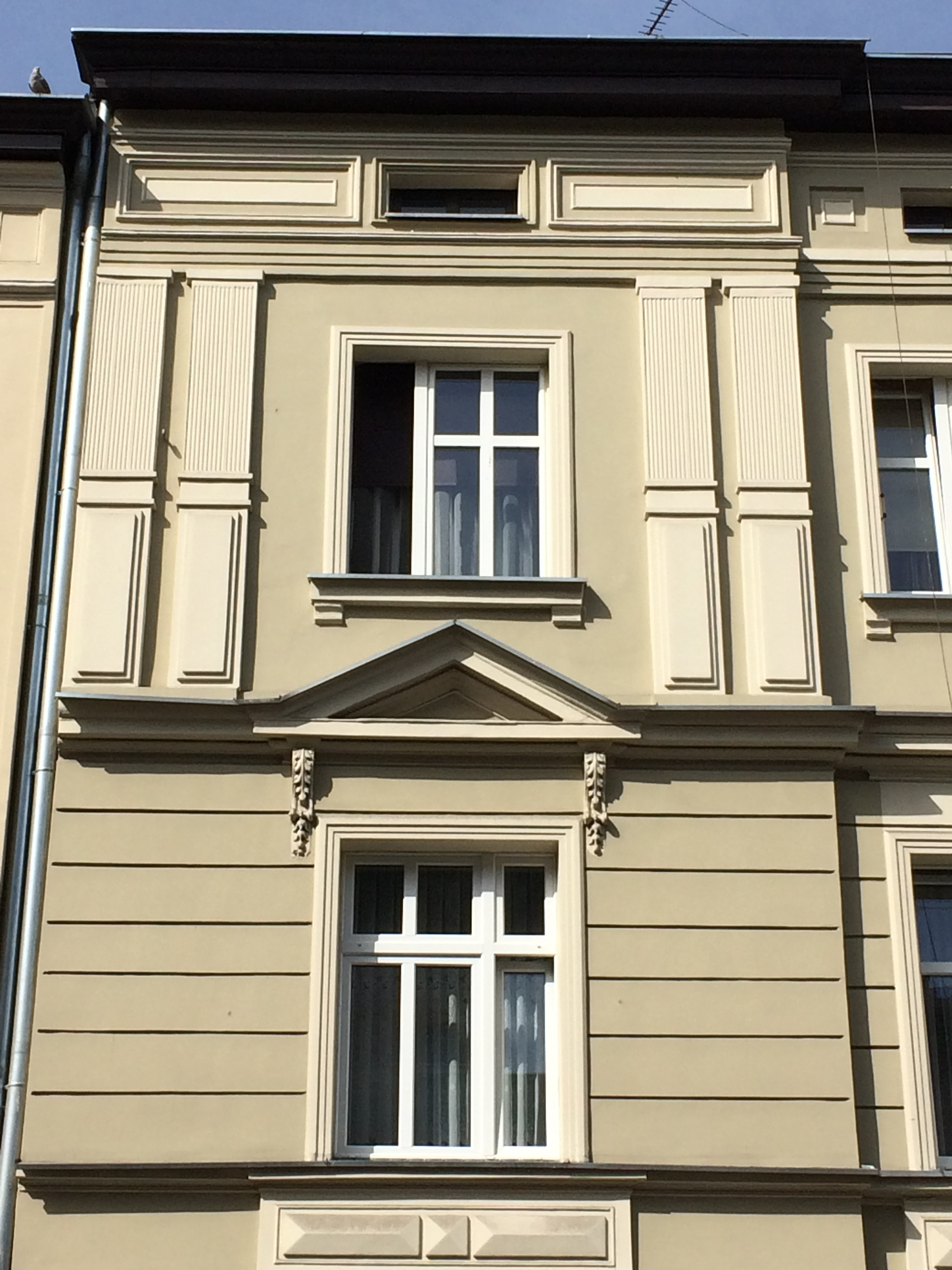
Detail of window adorning

=== Tenement at 52 ===
1903

Art nouveau, forms of early Modern architecture

Although the plot has been occupied from the late 19th century, the current building was built on behalf of Adolf Haase, a railway engineer, who moved there one year after its completion in 1904.

The facade features elements of Art Nouveau details, with its curved shape of the gable or the gate, as well as the presence of thin pilasters flanking middle windows up to the top. However, Art Nouveau ornamentation can not be detected further on, other than rudimentary pediments. We rather discover lean elevation rid of motifs, characterized by vertical lines, simply decorated balconies, typical of early modernism.

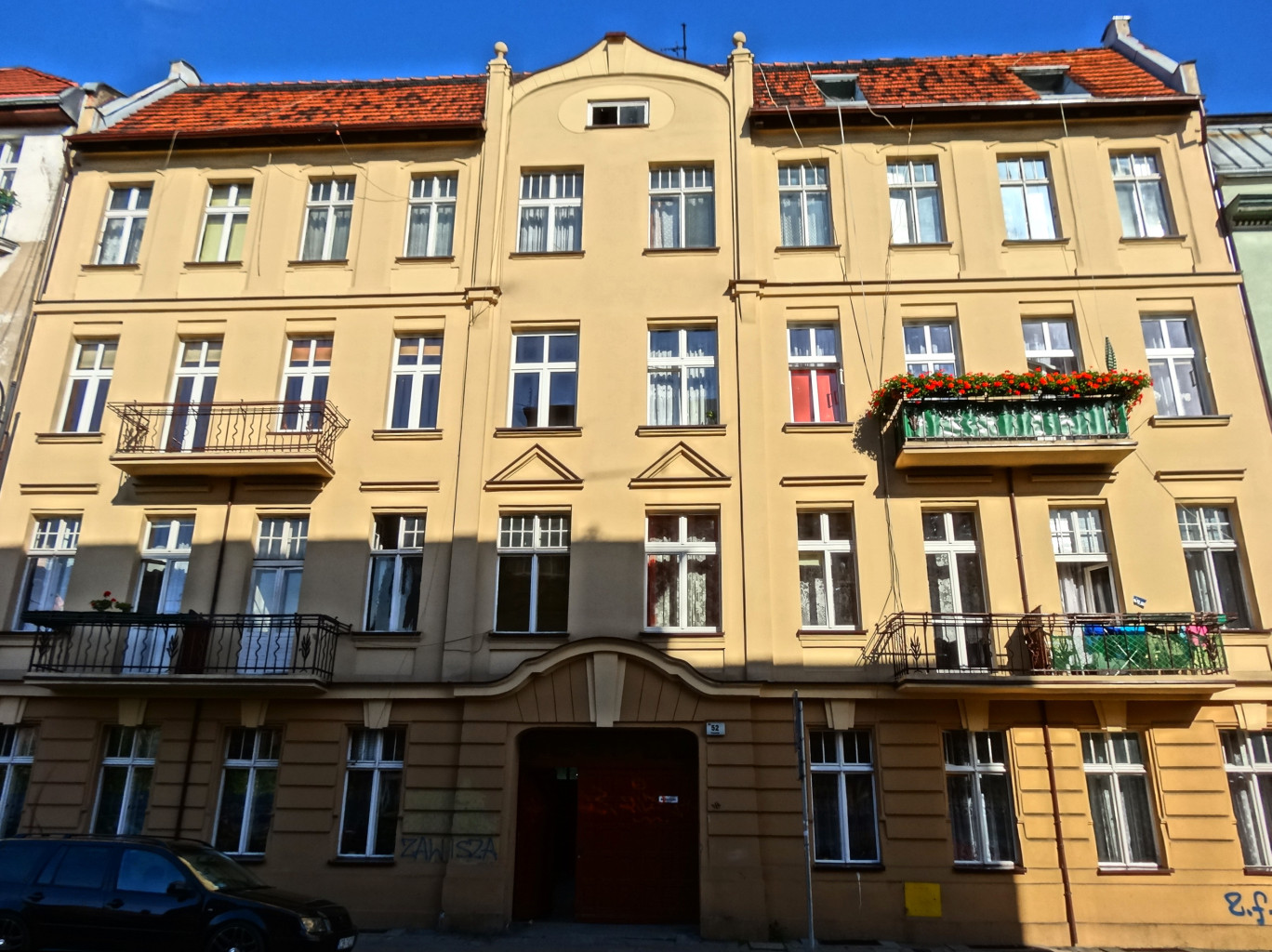
Facade from the street

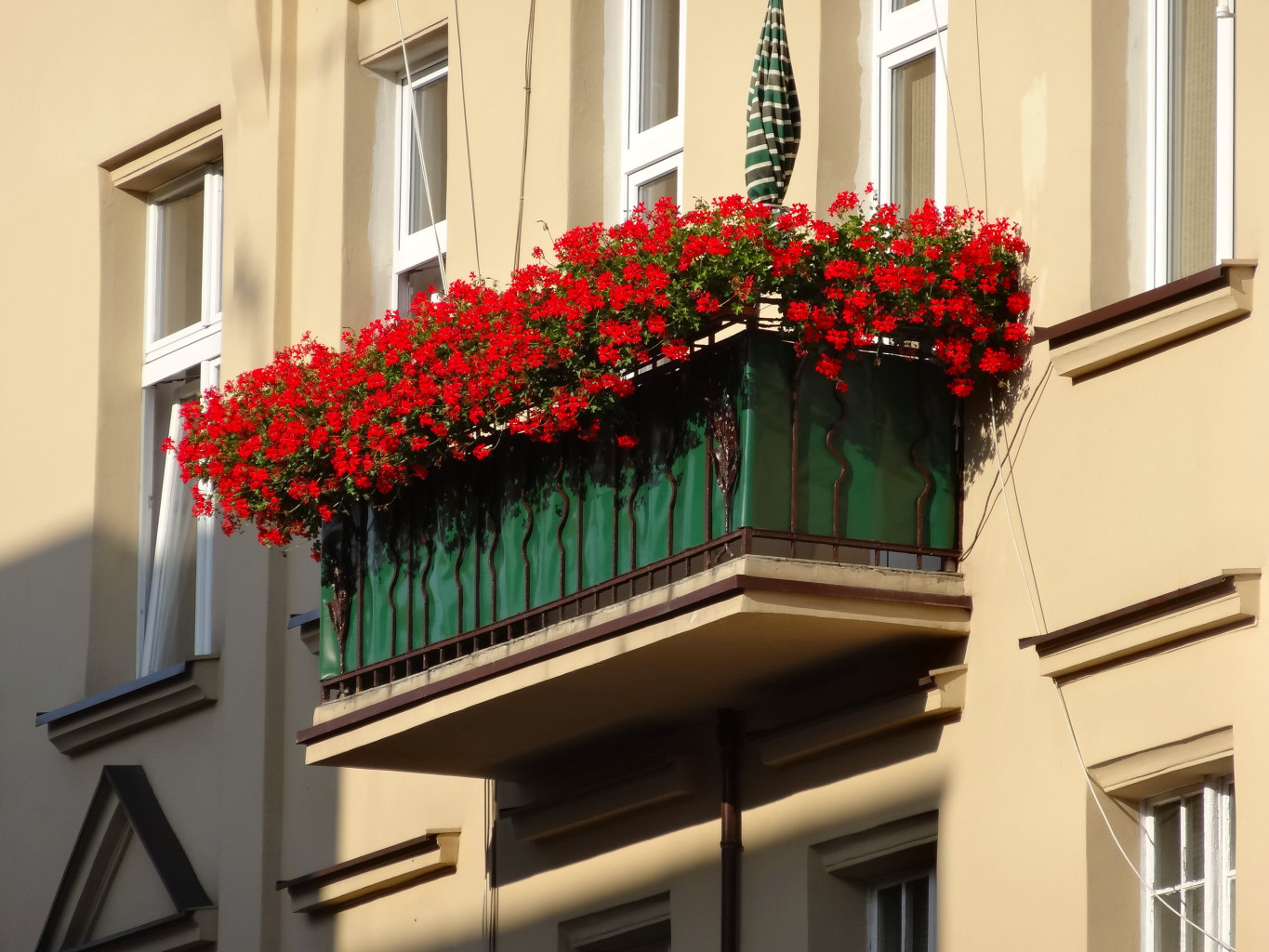
Detail of a balcony

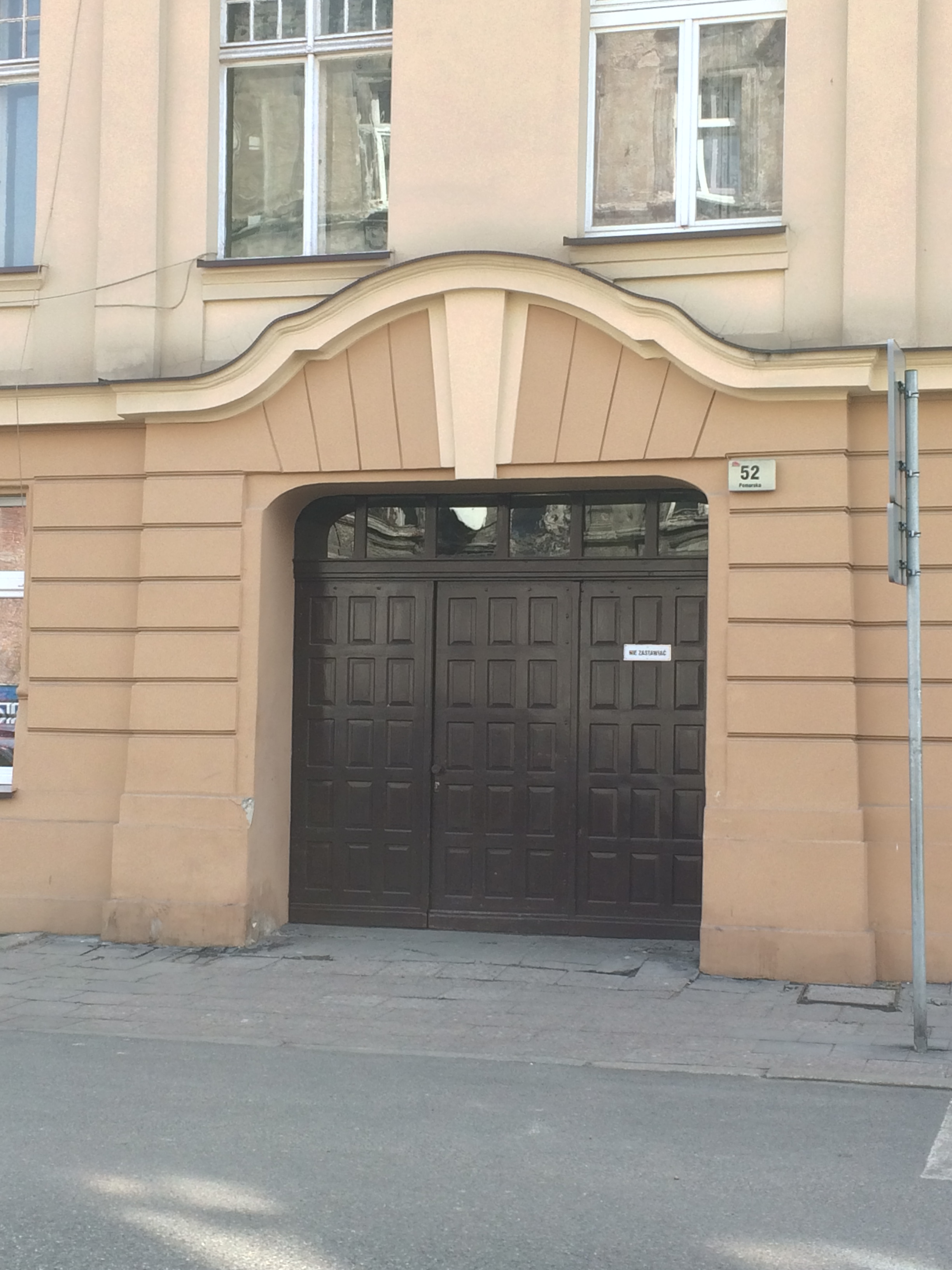
Main gate

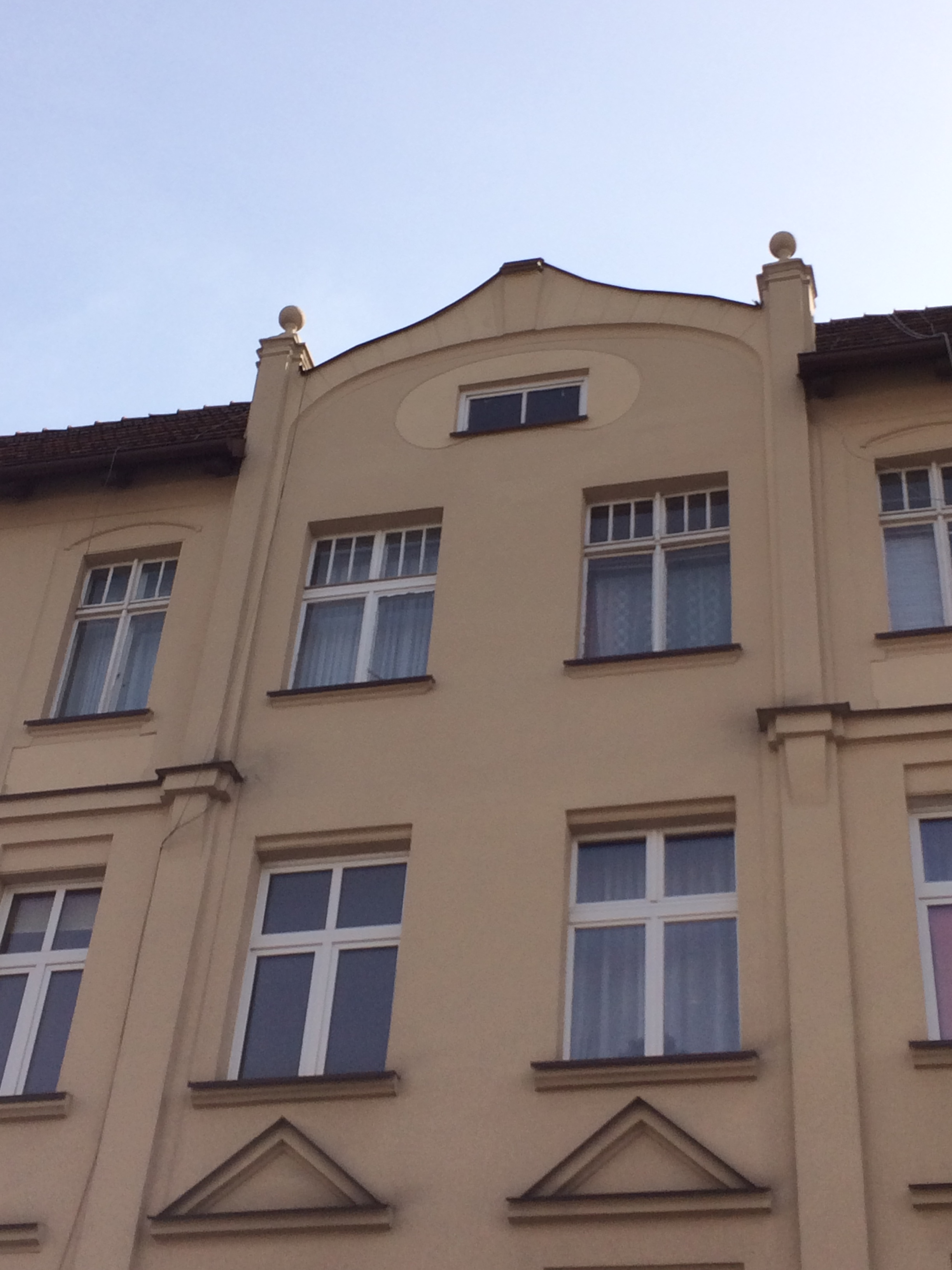
Avant-corps

=== Tenement at 53, corner with 1 Mazowiecka street ===
1893–1894

Historicism

Initial address was Heinestraße 2. The Bräuer family lived there from the erection of the tenement in the 1880s until World War I.

The building, though badly damaged by time and lack of maintenance, keeps some elements of its glorious past:

- Pediments of different shapes at each windows;
- Row of corbels beneath the roof;
- Balustrade at some openings;
- cartouches on the corner with motifs;
- Gates crowned with a bearded figure.
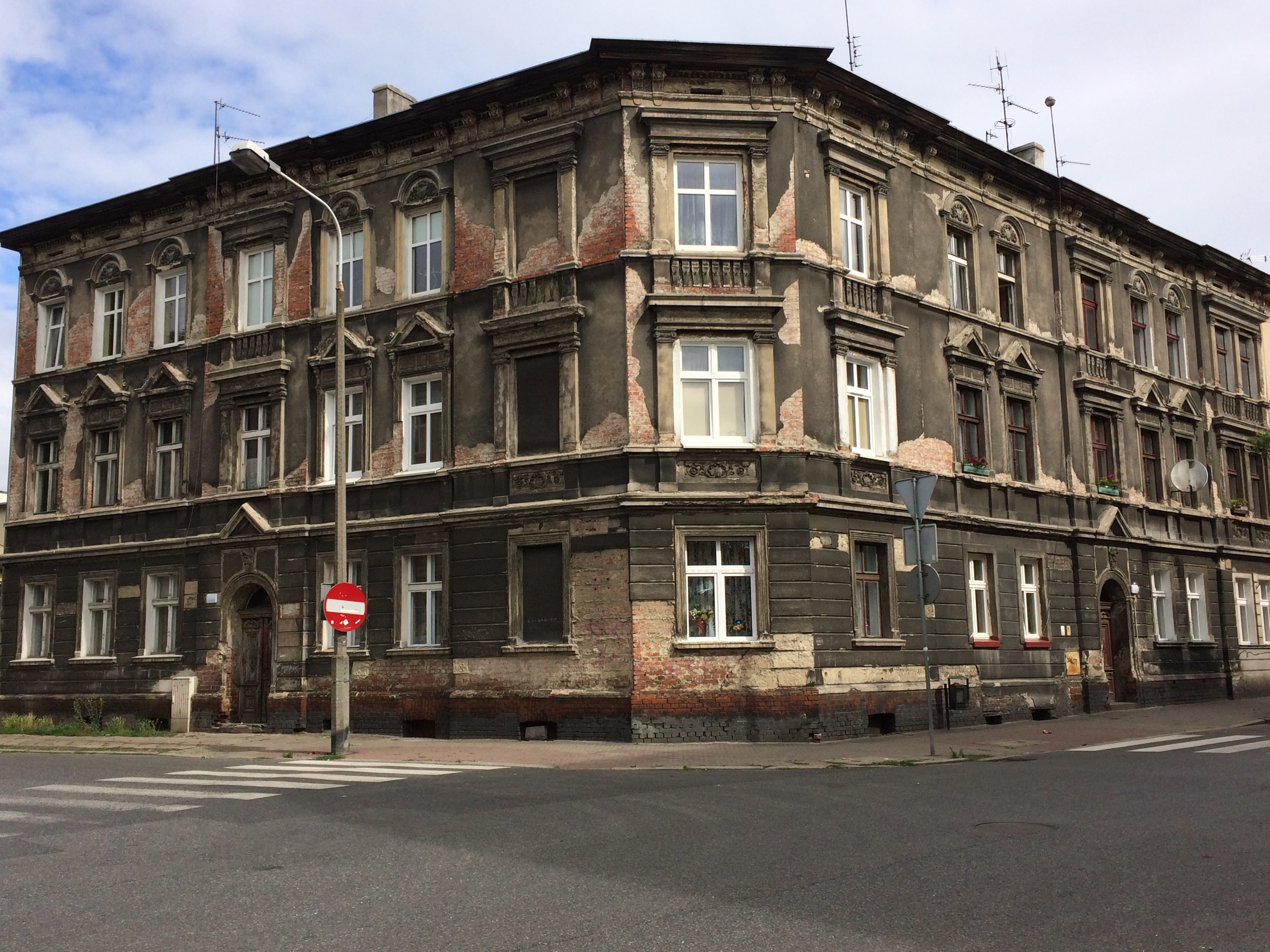
Corner view

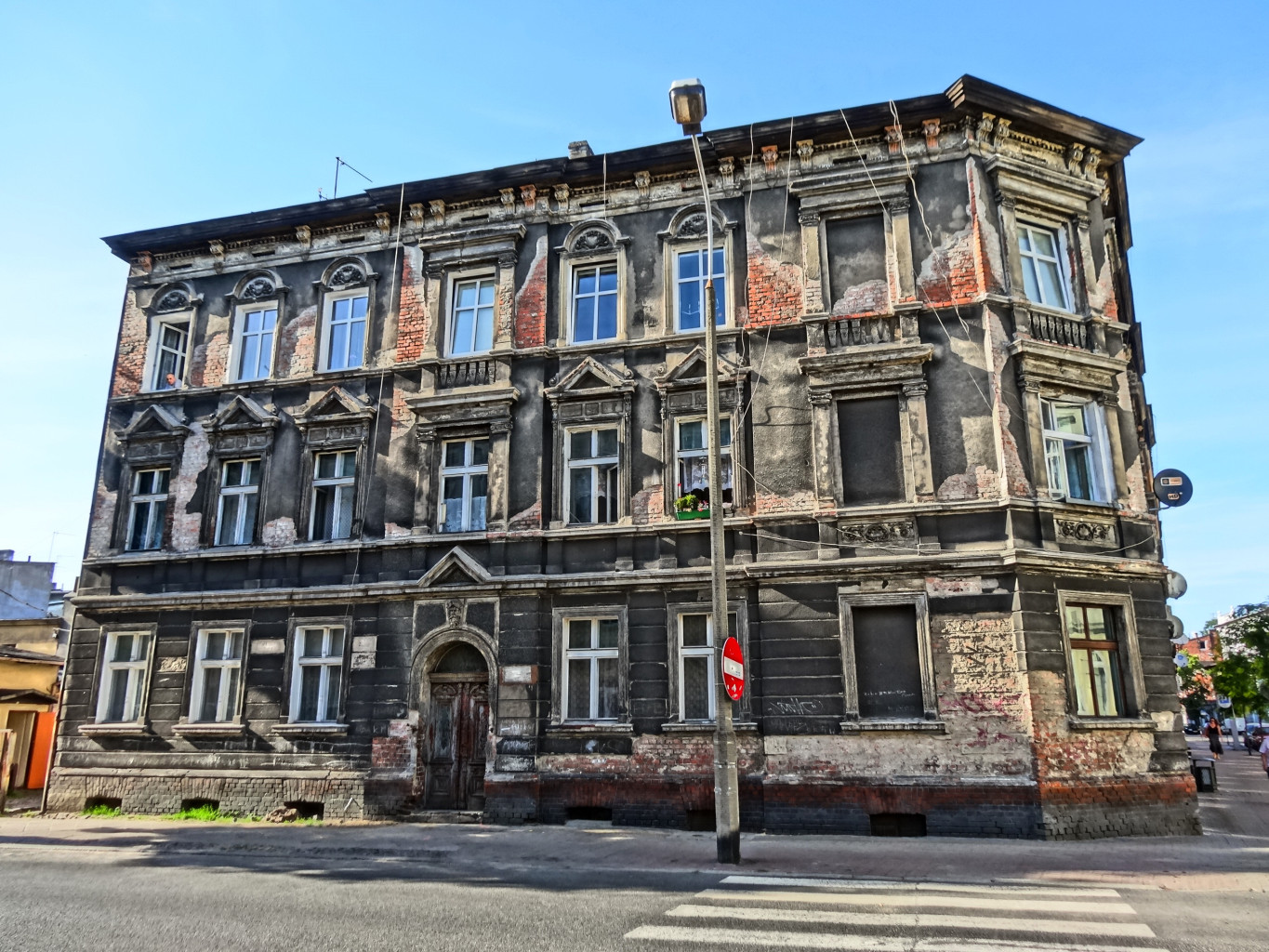
View from Mazowiecka street

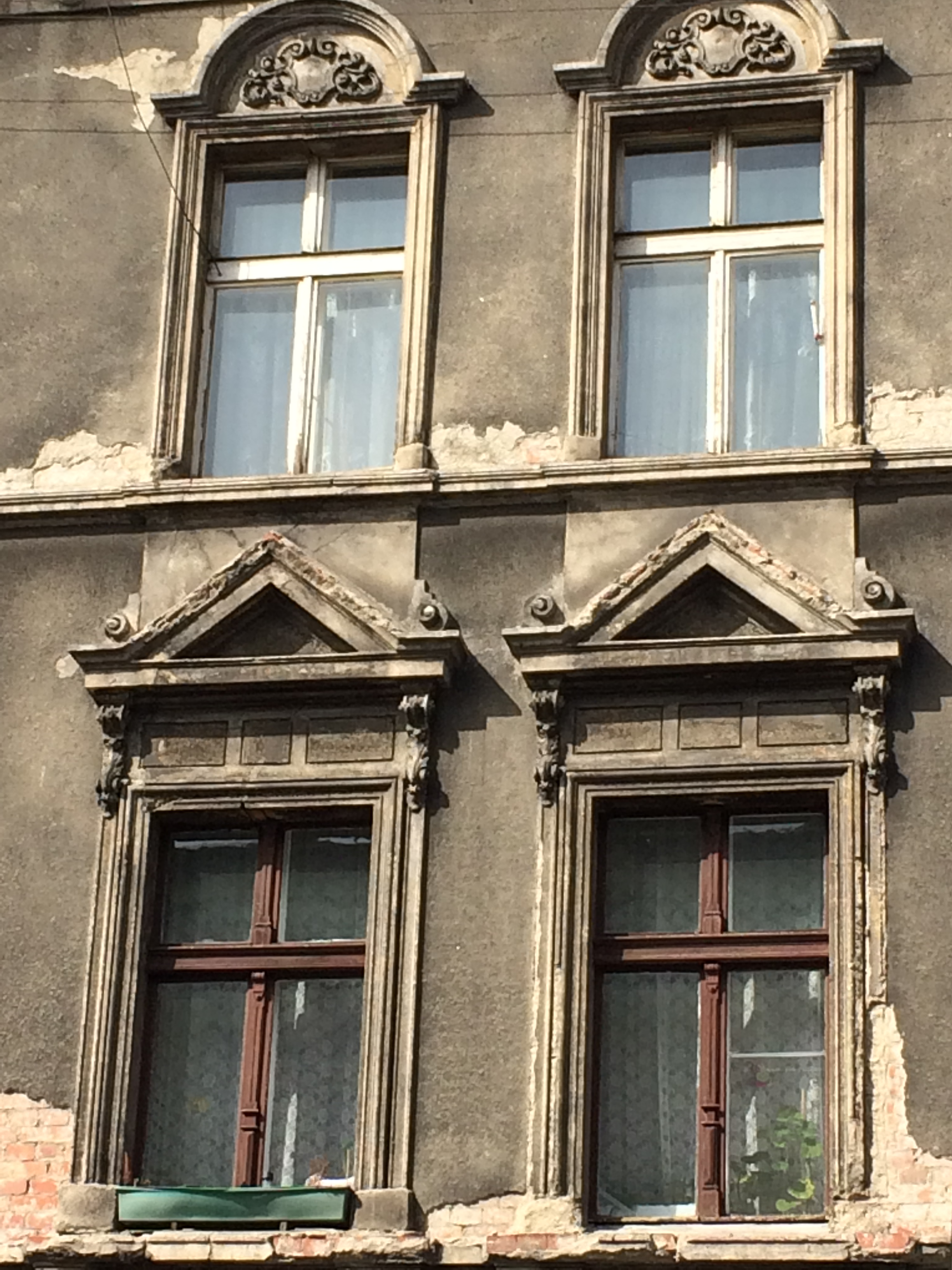
Detail of adorned windows

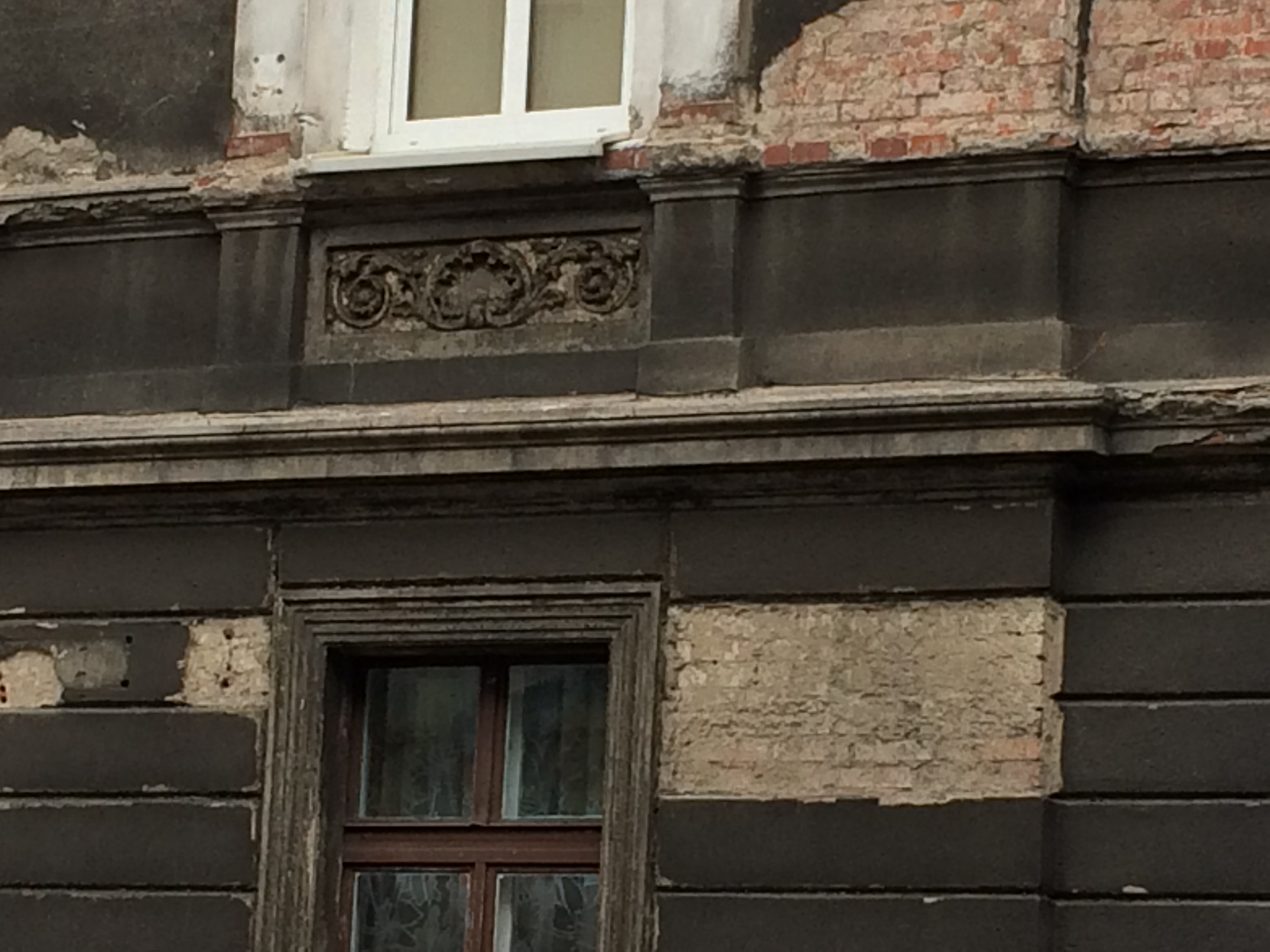
Detail of a cartouche

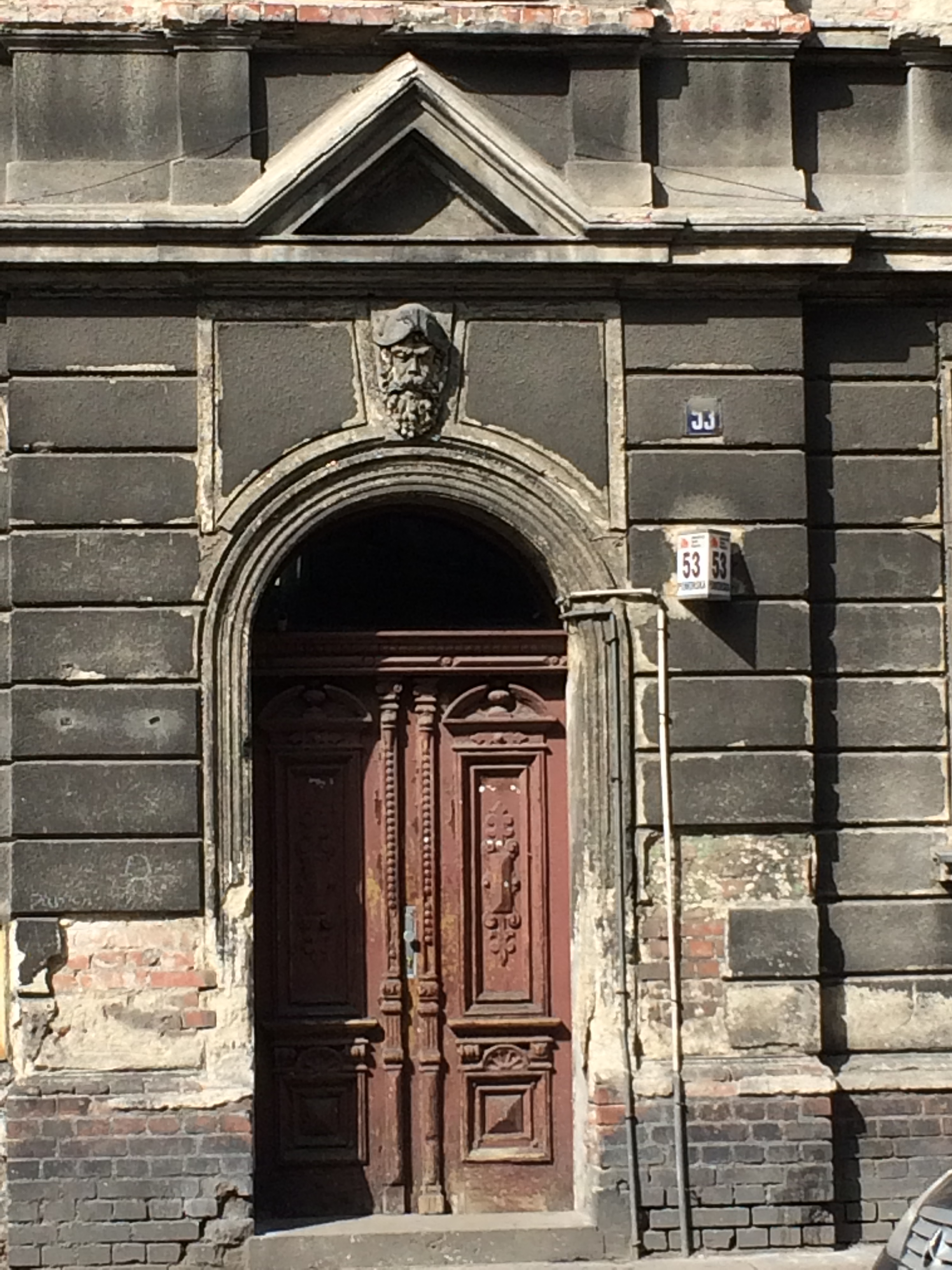
The gate and the overlooking figure

=== Tenement at 54 ===
1912–1913

Early Modern architecture

The plot at Rinkauerstraße 42, before this tenement, was owned by a gardener who sold it to Wilhelm Rahne, a plumber, who had the current building erected.

Thanks to a recent restoration in December 2014, the facade now boasts its original style. Few motifs are voluntarily displayed: an elaborate ornament above the entry gate and five eyebrow dormers on the roof. The balance of the elevation is granted by a small balcony in the centre, balanced by two grand bow window on each side, both of which are topped by a balcony. This naked frontage, combined with long vertical lines of windows and bow windows recall early modernist style elements.

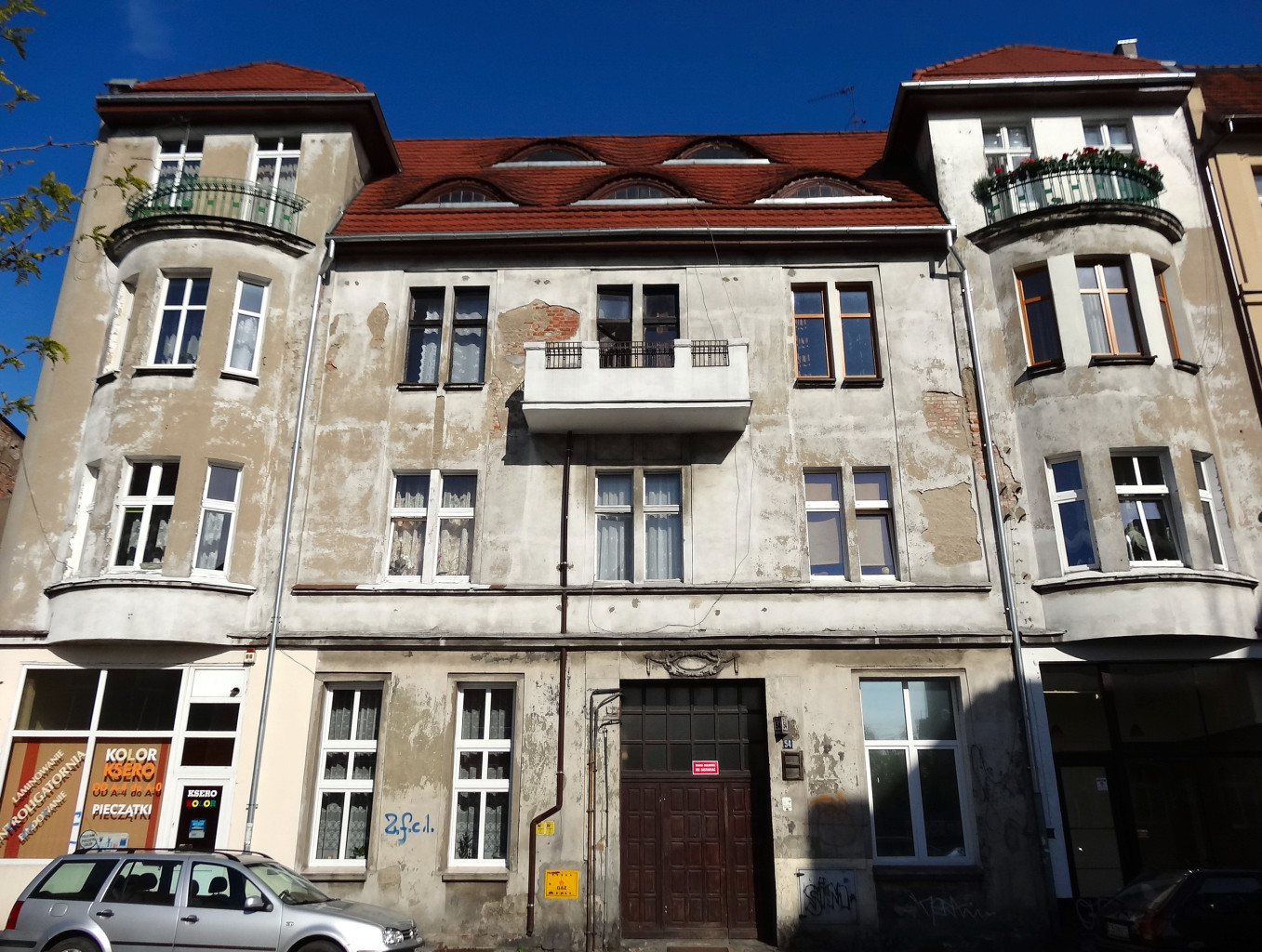
Facade before restoration

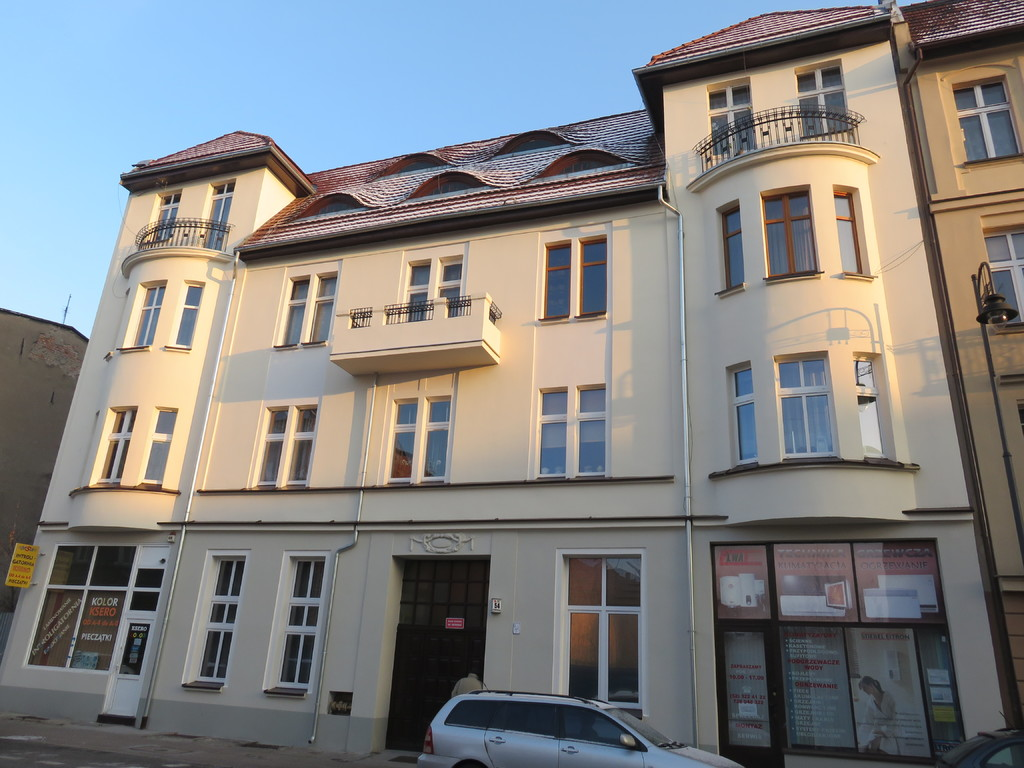
Renovated facade

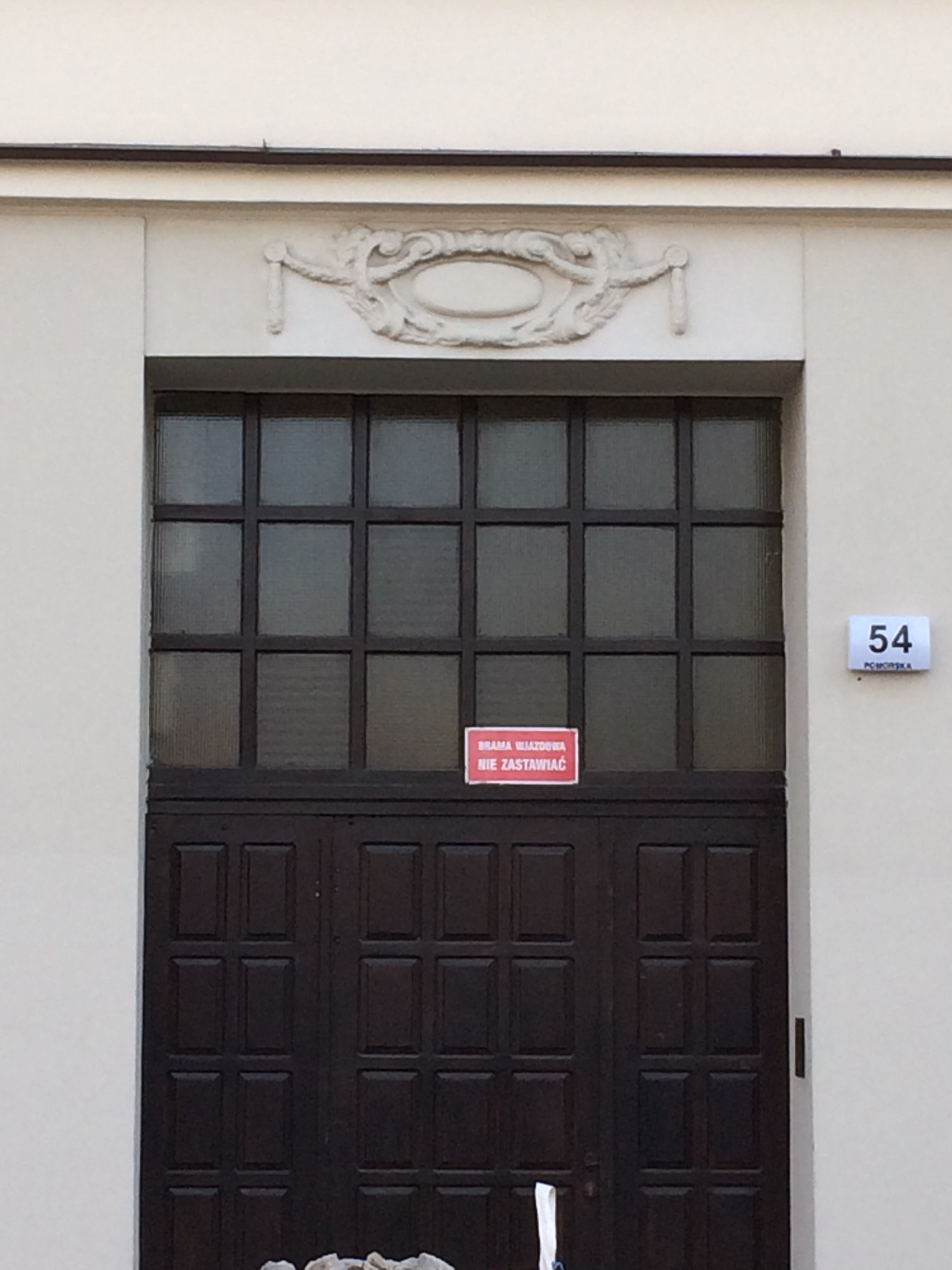
Detail on the main gate

=== Tenement at 55 ===
1890–1891

Eclecticism

First registered owner of this building at then "Rinkauerstraße 31" is Carl Heise, a craftsman making wrought articles and wheels. In 1946, 1946 Feliks and Stanisława Sowa opened there a bakery, the first one of the Sowa bakery chain.

From the street, the tenement features nice festoons and pediments on a balanced frontage.

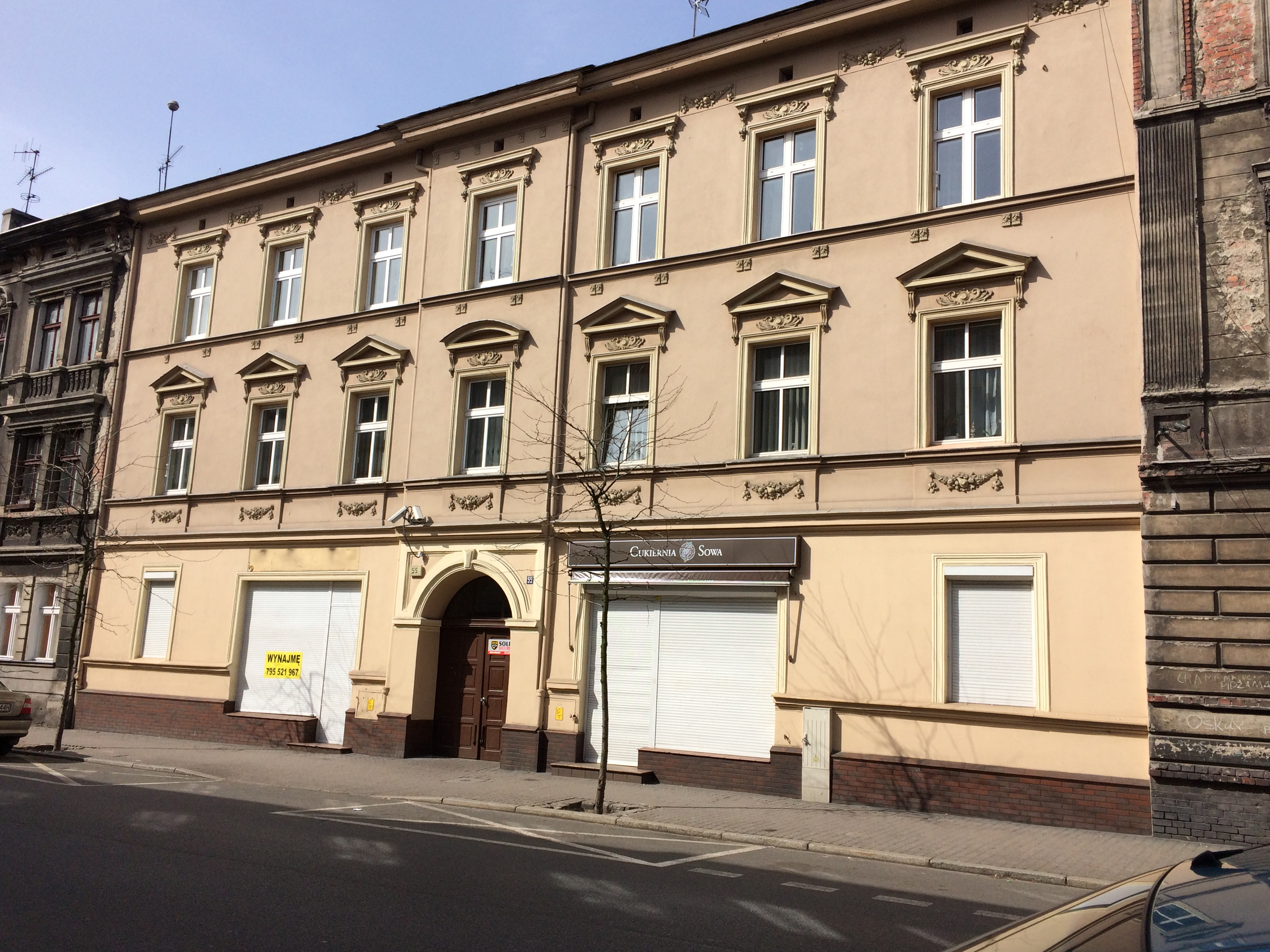
Main frontage from the street

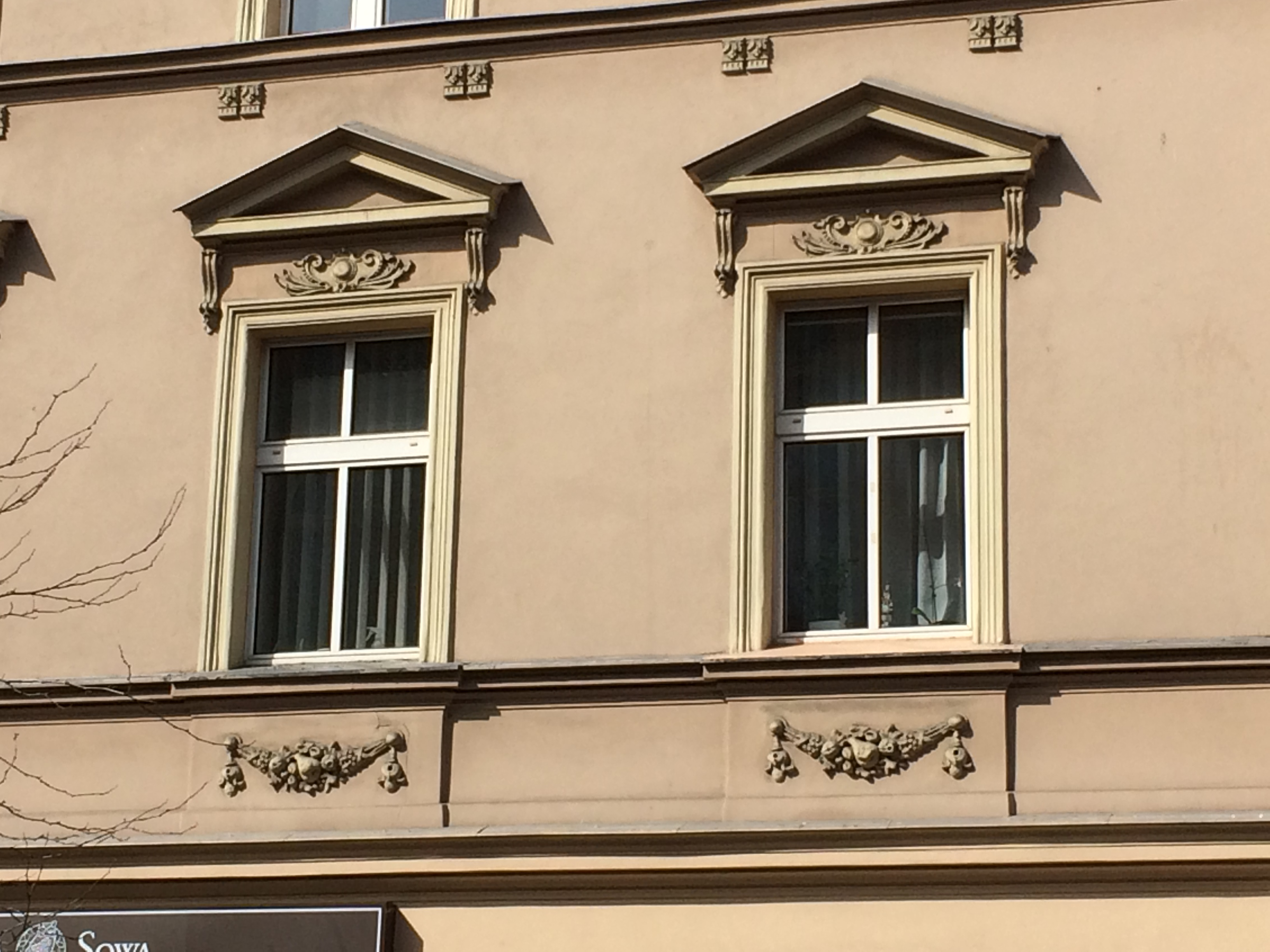
Details of festoons and pediment

=== Tenement at 57, corner with Hetmańska street ===
1892–1893

Eclecticism

Initial address was Rinkauerstraße 32, its first landlord was a locksmith, Franz Sokolowski.

Both elevations are damaged, but one can still make out some decorated cartouches, pilasters and corbels at the base of the gable.

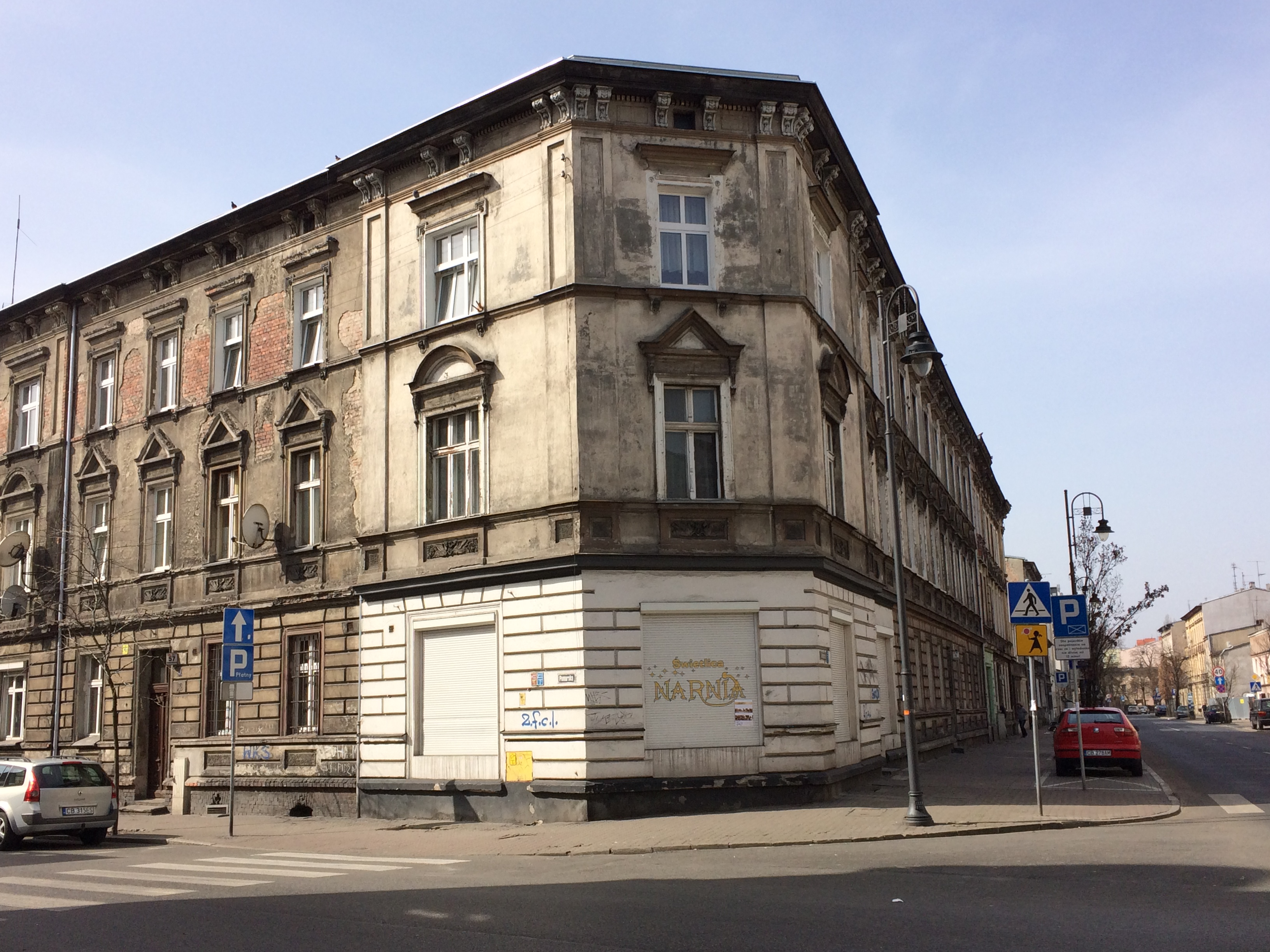
Corner view

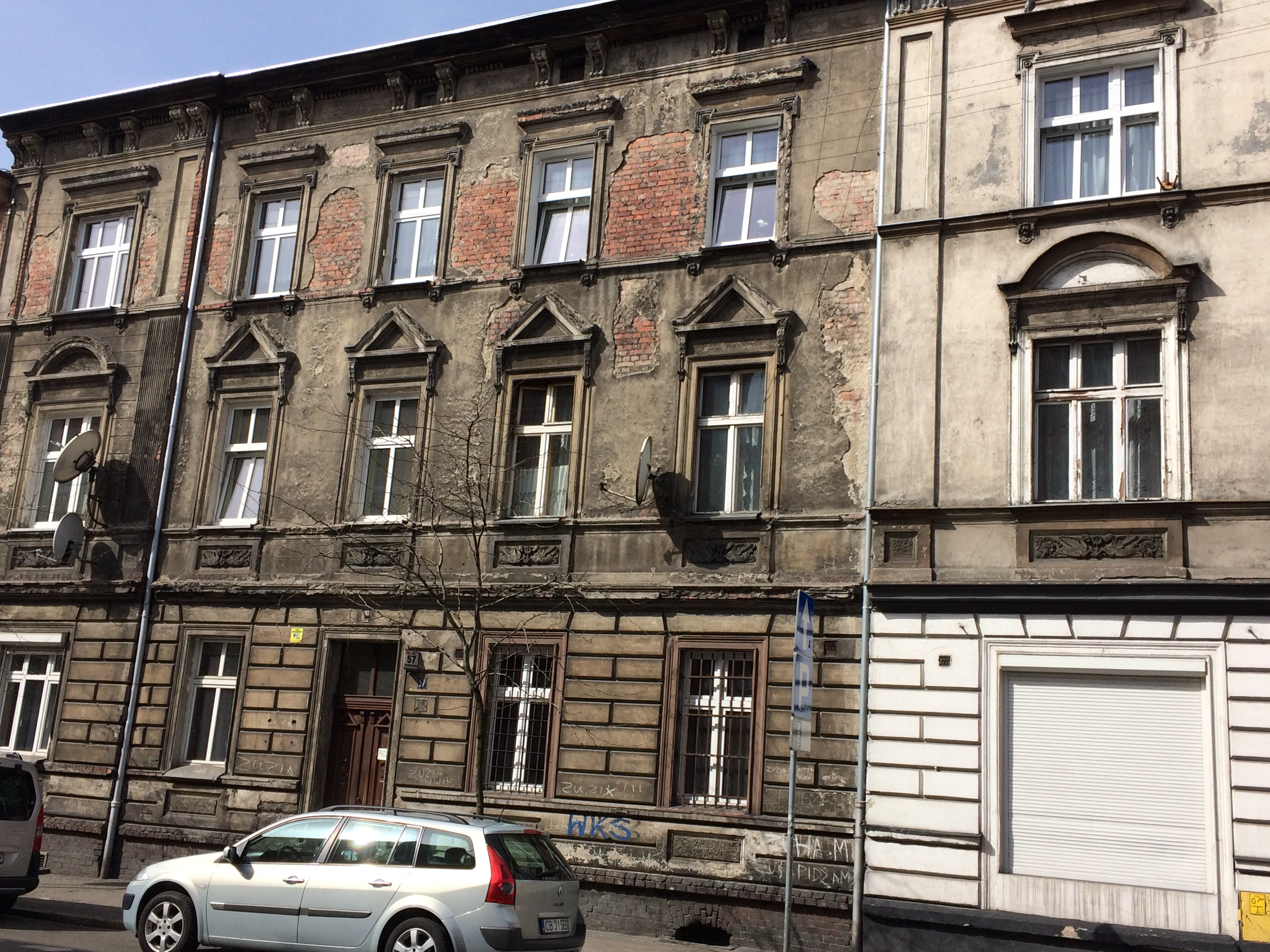
Facade on Pomorska street

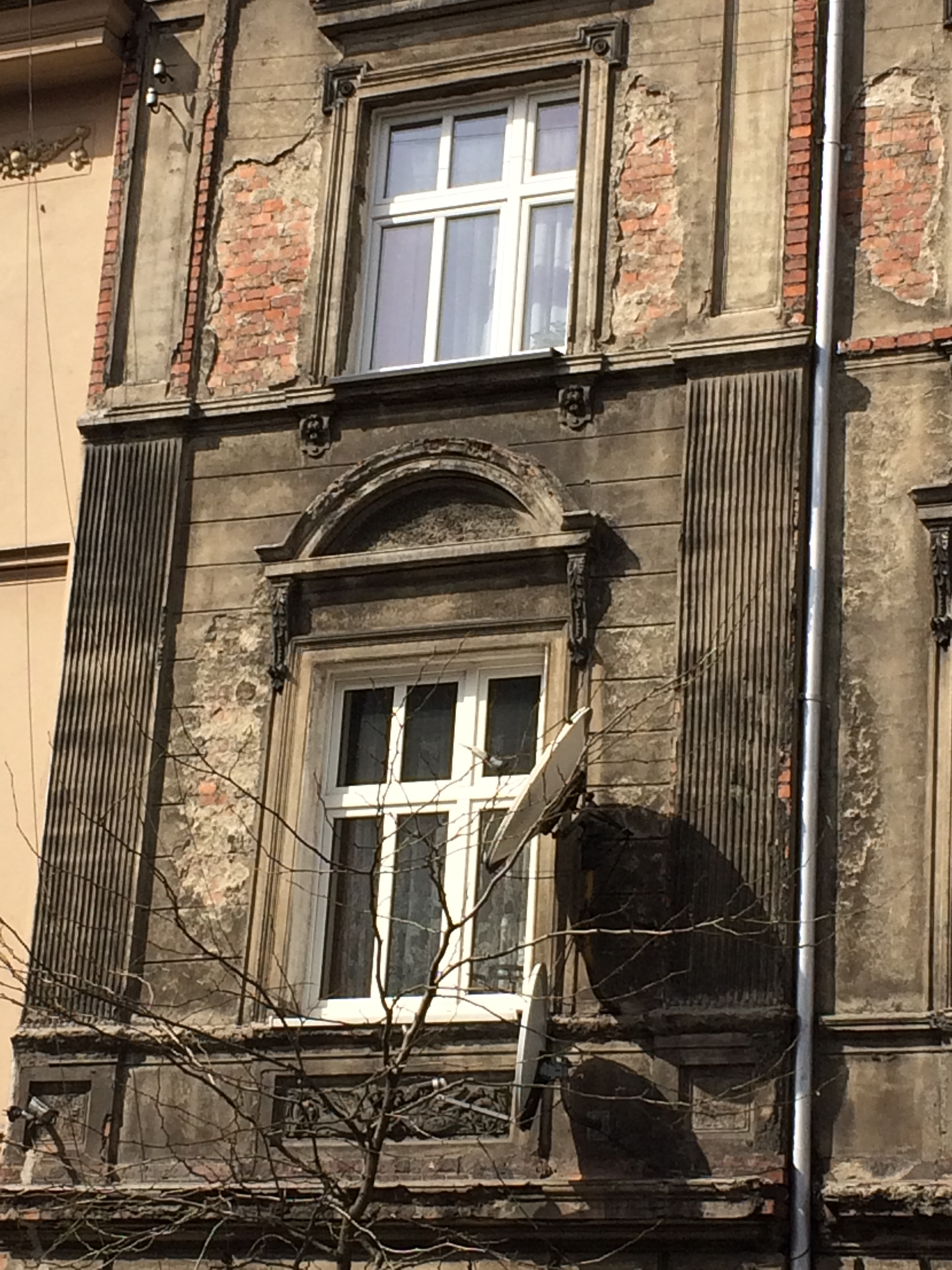
Detail of the facade

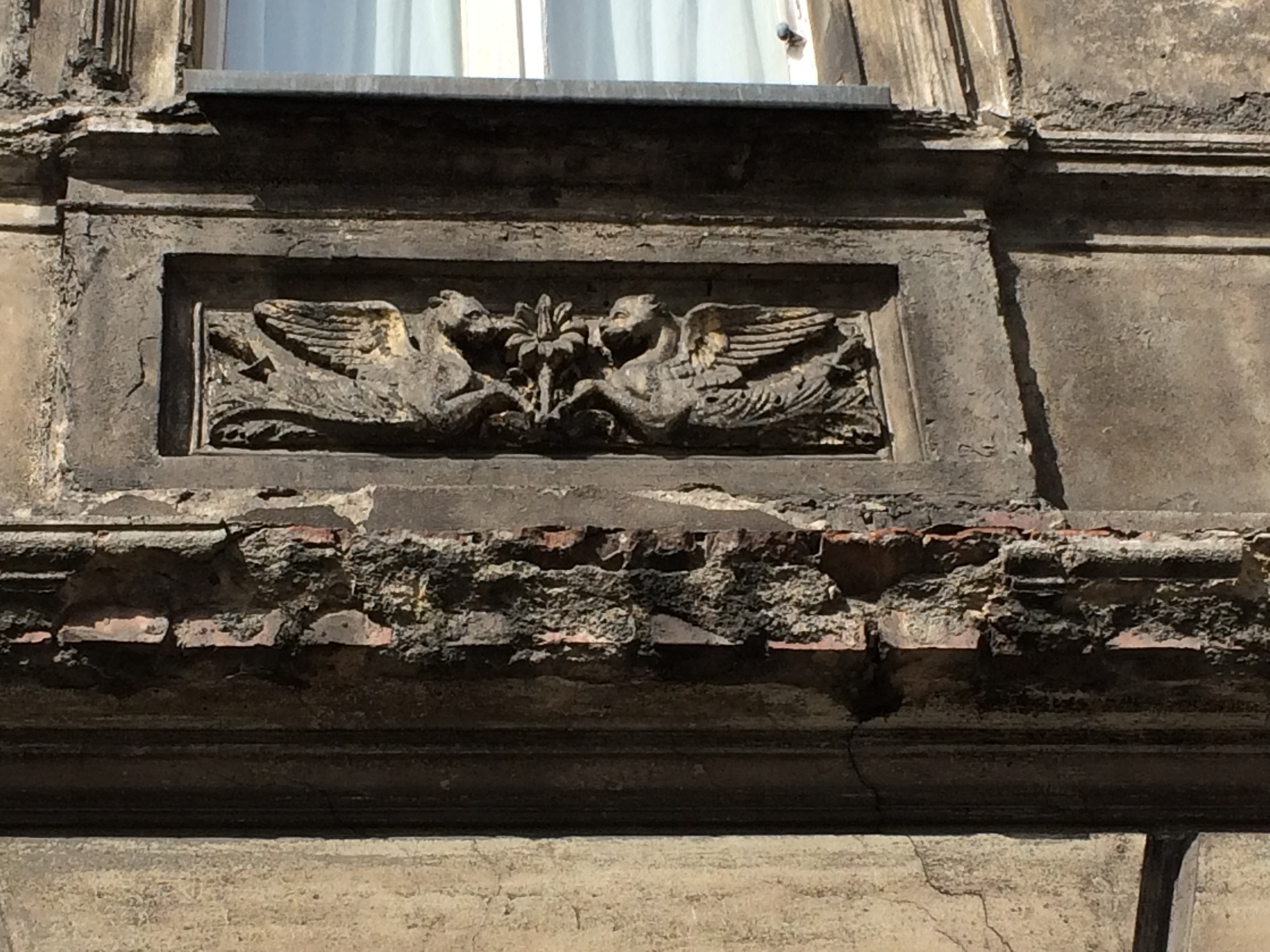
Cartouche detail

Northern part of Pomorska street, on the other side of the intersection with Świętojańska street, was named before 1920 Verlängerte Rinkauerstraße ("Extended Rinkauerstraße"), and from 1920 to 1945 Ulica Szczecinska ("Szczecin Street").

=== Tenement at 59, corner with Hetmańska street. ===
1895–1896

Historicism

Initial address was Verl. Rinkauerstraße or Verlängerte Rinkauerstraße (Extended Rinkauer street) Nr.1. A secretary, Julius Hoffmann was the first owner of the tenement after its construction. A painter, Carl Knuth, was landlord there one year later.

The building has been nicely renovated in 2014–2015. This massive corner house displays many architectural motifs, such as:

- Pediments of different shapes at each windows;
- Round balconies overlooking the corner;
- Corbel table;
- A series of shed dormers on top of both facades.
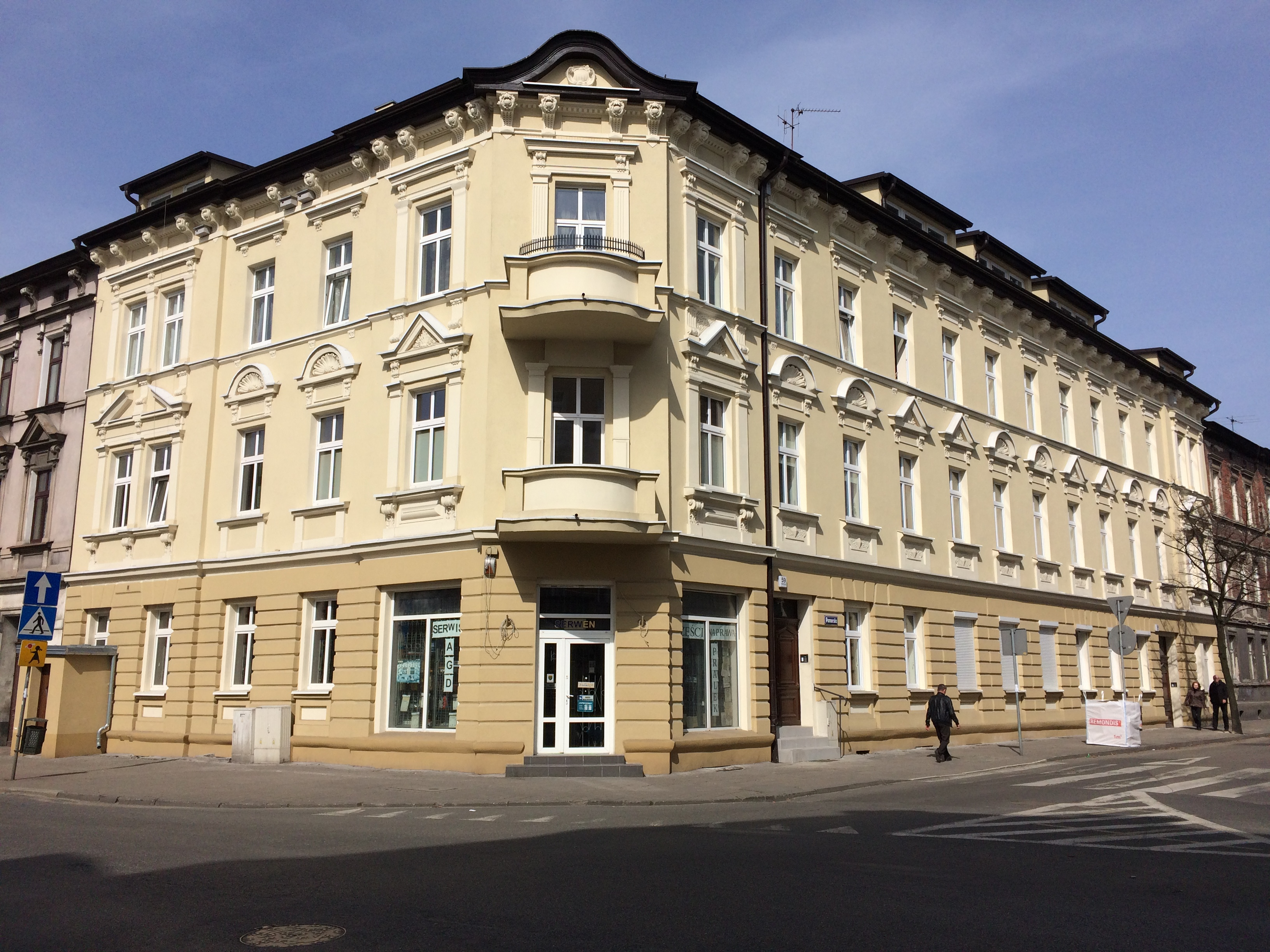
View of both facades

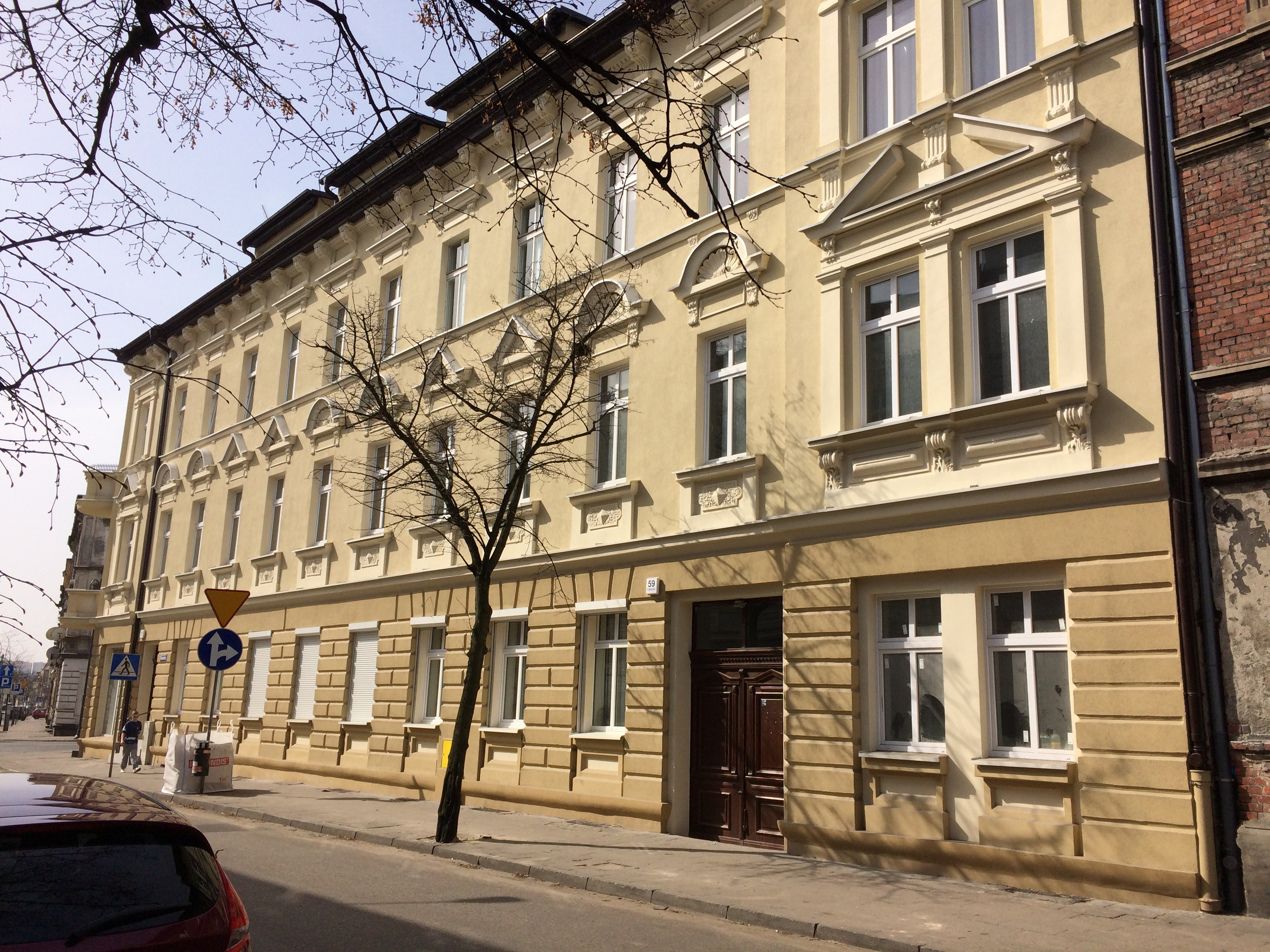
View of the facade on Pomorska

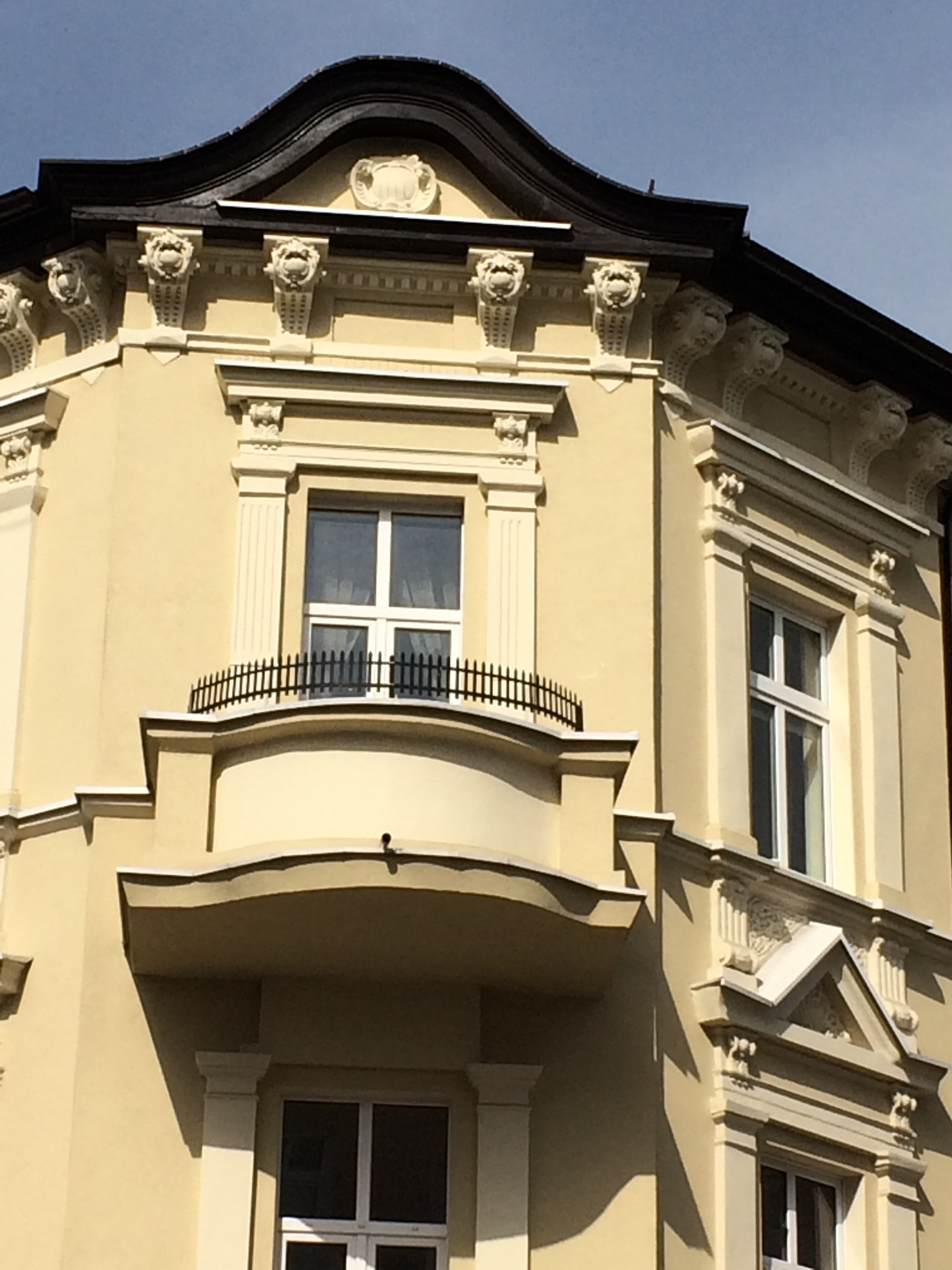
Detail of a corner balcony

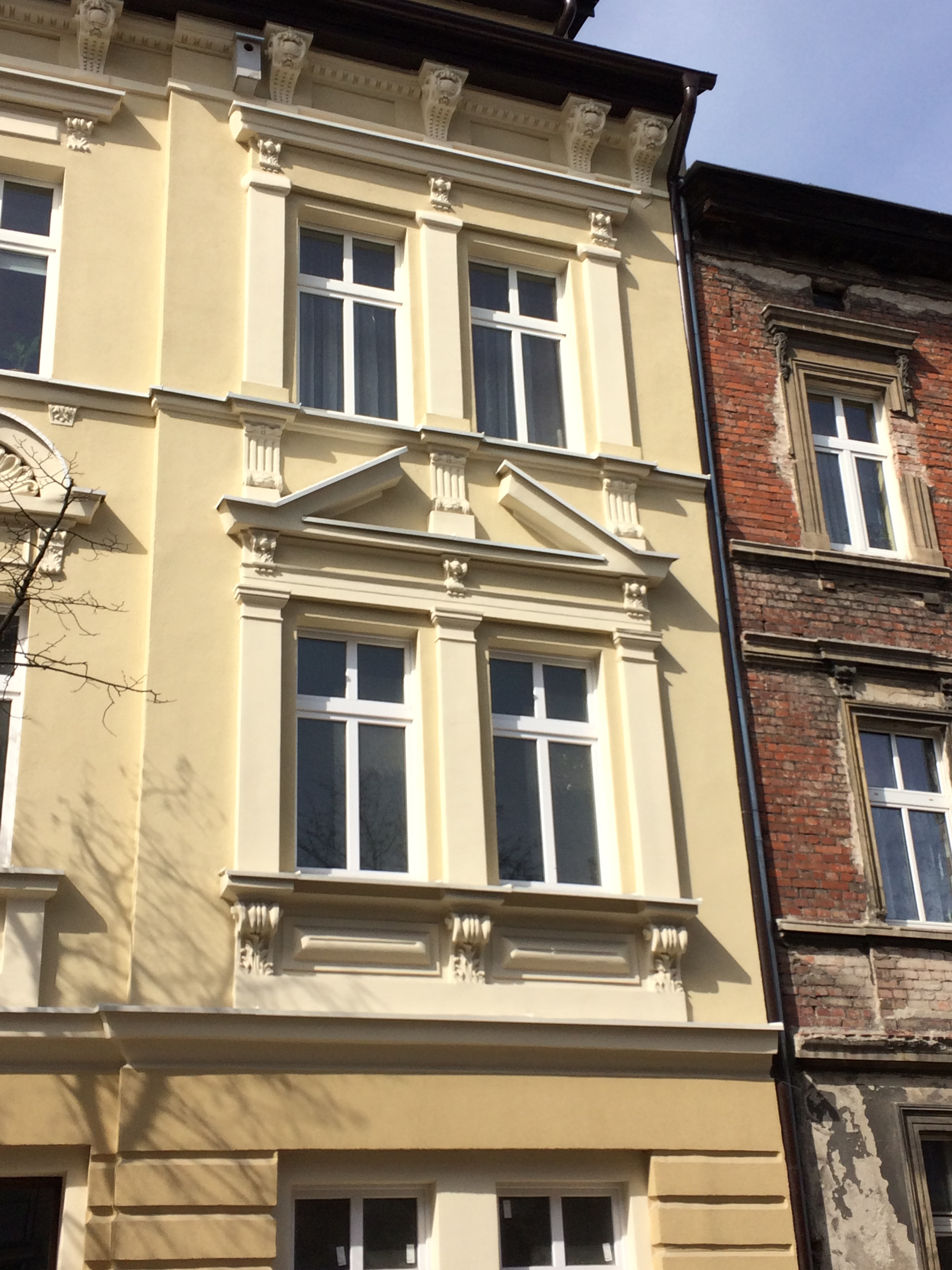
Window decoration

=== Tenement at 60 ===
1912

Art nouveau, forms of early Modern architecture

After its completion, the actual building, then at Rinkauerstraße 39, housed the "Bromberger wirtschaftsverein" (Bromberg business club). In 1933, the place accommodated a factory of wholesale flours and breads, "Panis", then a bakery owned by Jozef Krajnik until the war. After World War II, Zygmunt Ciupek took over the place and run a candy factory, Danuta, in the courtyard, which was soon merged into a local cooperative. Since 1990, a bakery, "Cemak", is anew located there.

The building design echoes houses at Nr.27, with the ornamented gate with floral motifs (in the Art Nouveau style), but also house at Nr.52, by the absence of facade decoration and its lean forms. Once can underline the two long bay windows that run up to the gable, giving balance and stability to the ensemble.

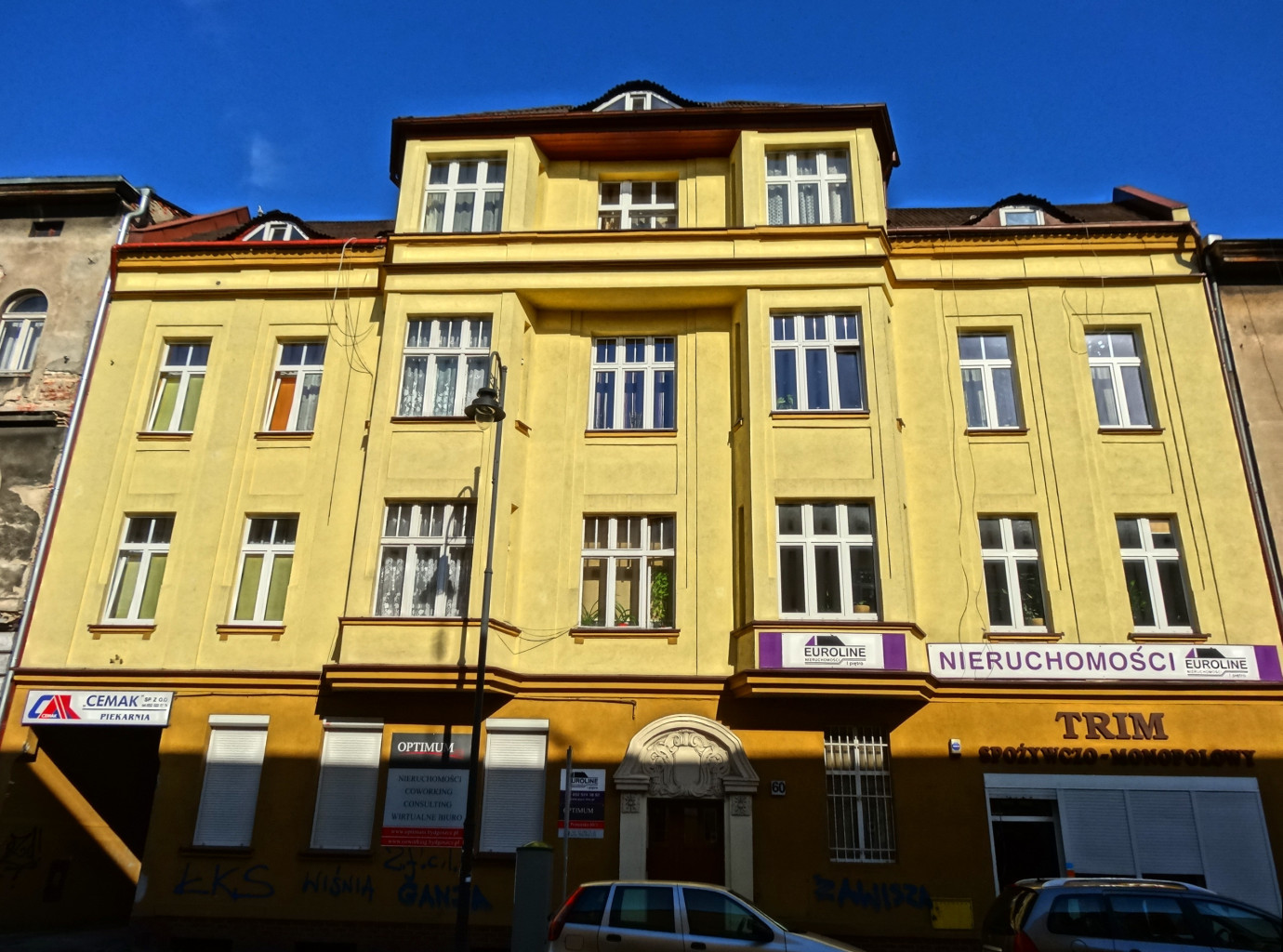
Front elevation on the street

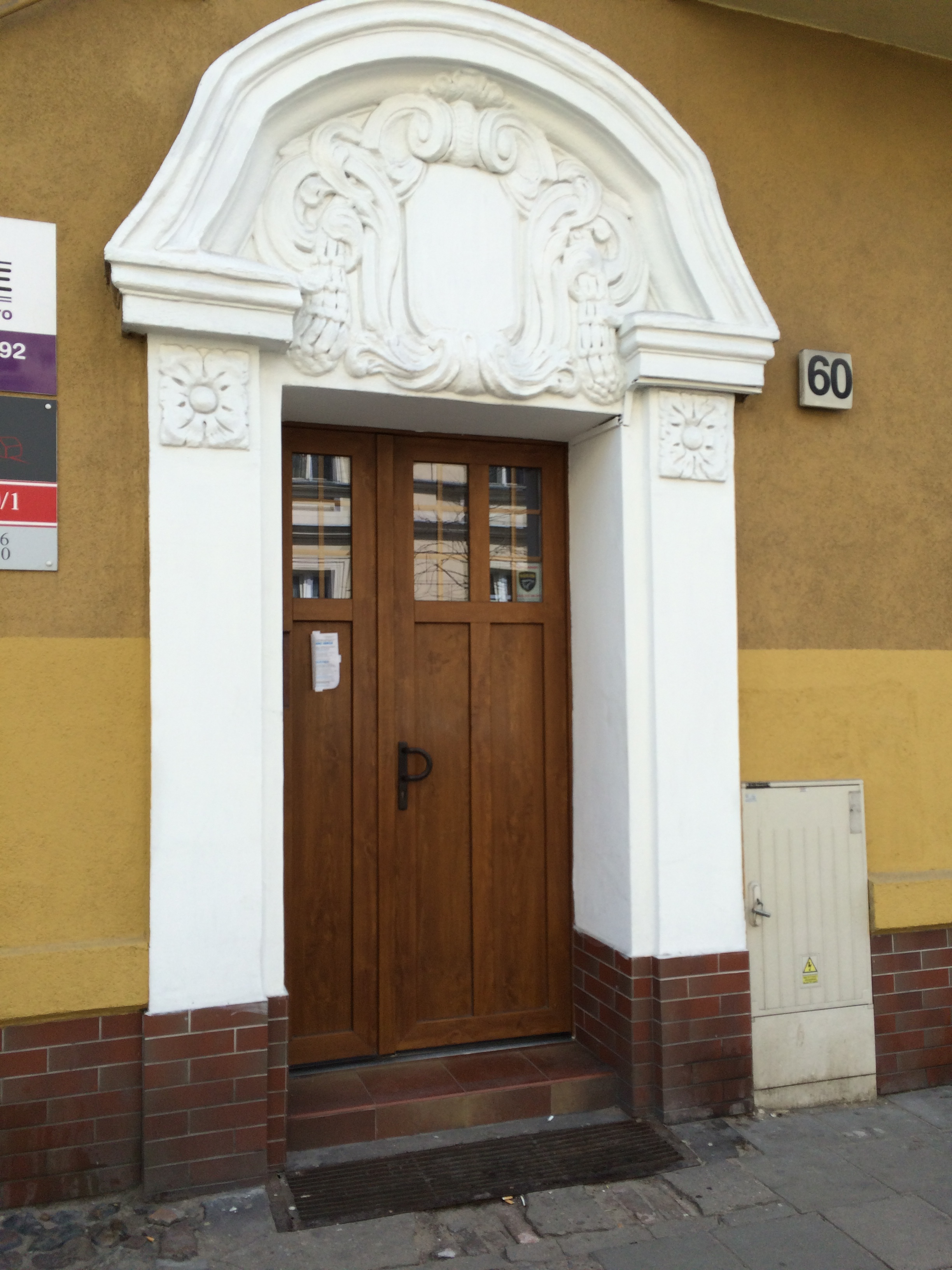
Main gate

=== Tenement at 66 ===
1893

Eclecticism, forms of Neoclassicism

Emanuel Latowski, a turner, bought the building situated at Rinkauerstraße 36 in 1890 and had it rebuilt in 1893. He lived there till the end of World War I. Today it is the seat of the Bydgoszcz Association of Houses Owners and Managers (Polish: ZWiZD Bydgoszcz- Zrzeszenie Właścicieli i Zarządców Domów w Bydgoszczy), a 50-year-old local real estate institution.

The main elevation is strikingly classicist: apart from the front gate, all the decoration radiates the notion of symmetry and harmony. Such are the position of pediments, small balustrade and pairs of pilasters. The facade has undergone a recent restoration.

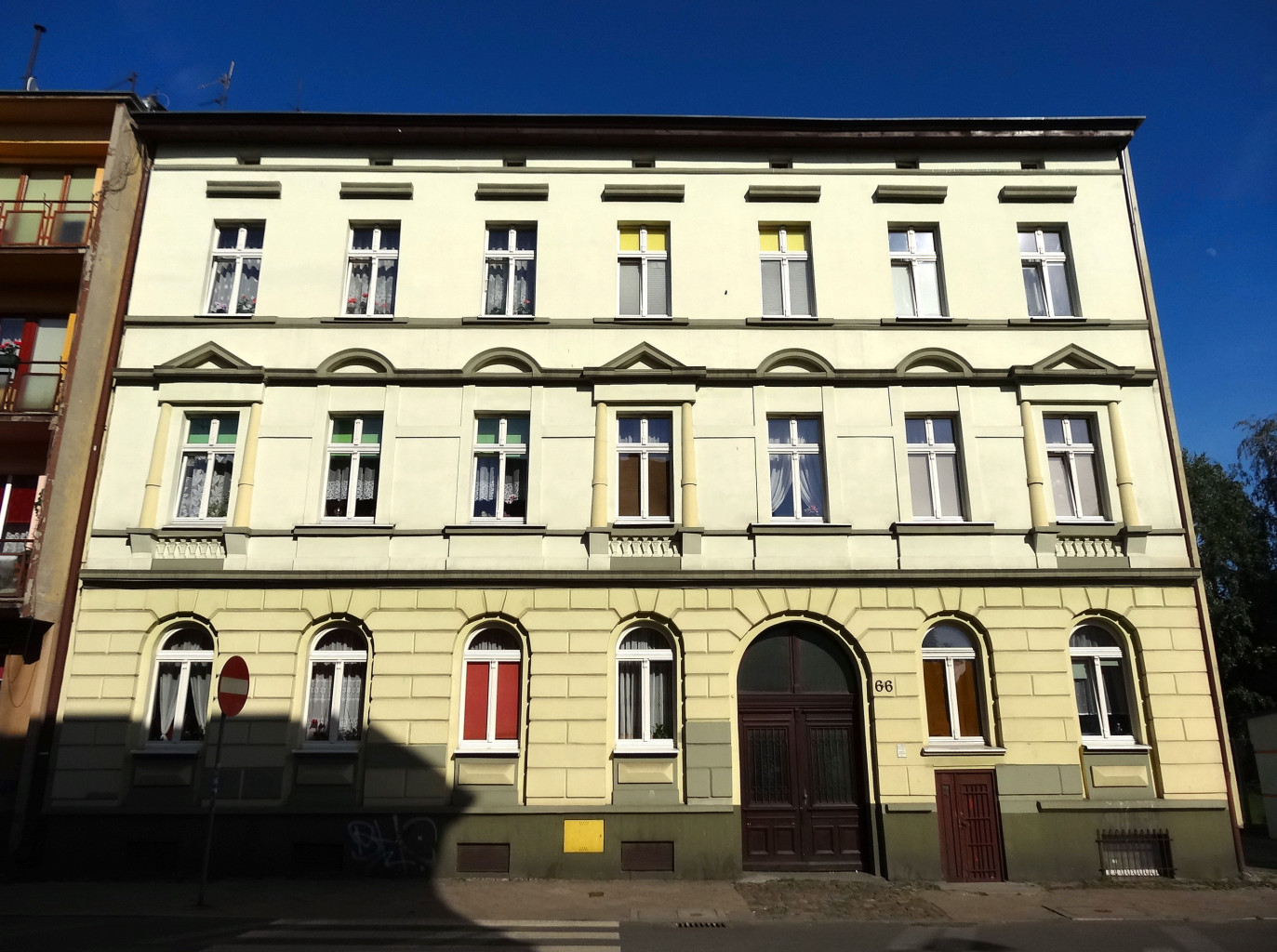
Front elevation on the street

=== Tenement at 67 ===
1903–1904

Historicism

Initial address was Verl. Rinkauerstraße or Verlängerte Rinkauerstraße (Extended Rinkauer street) Nr.5, it was owned by Otto Warmbier, a rentier. The tenement has been fully restored in 2021.

The building elevation has delicate human figures and other motifs inside triangular pediments of the first floor. At each extremity are male figures, the pediment over the entry gate displays a female one, adorned like a noble: in between them are floral and vegetal ornaments. On top of the facade, corbels have been given also women figures.

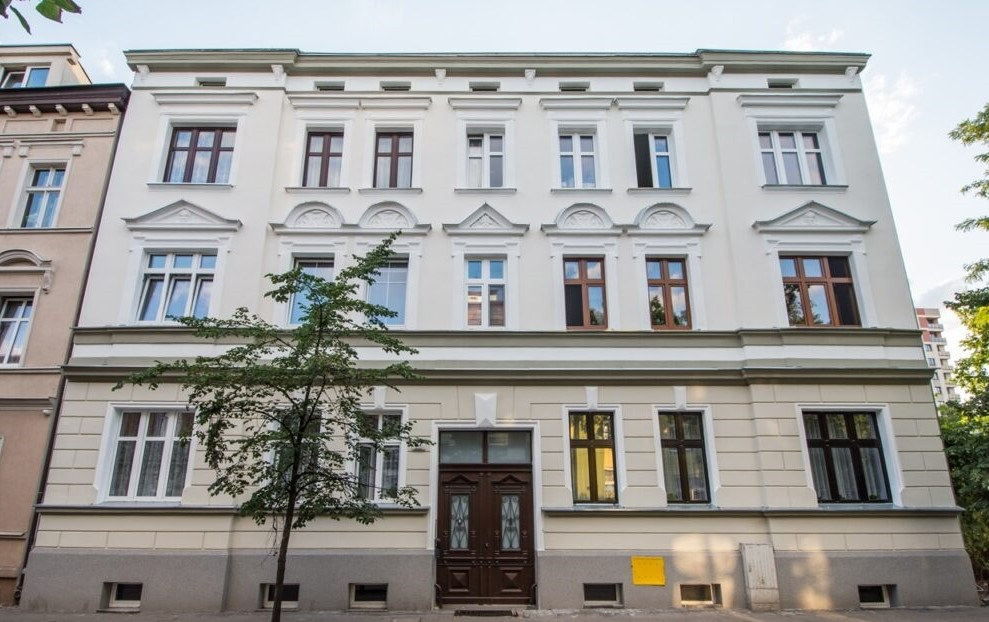
Main facade after renovation

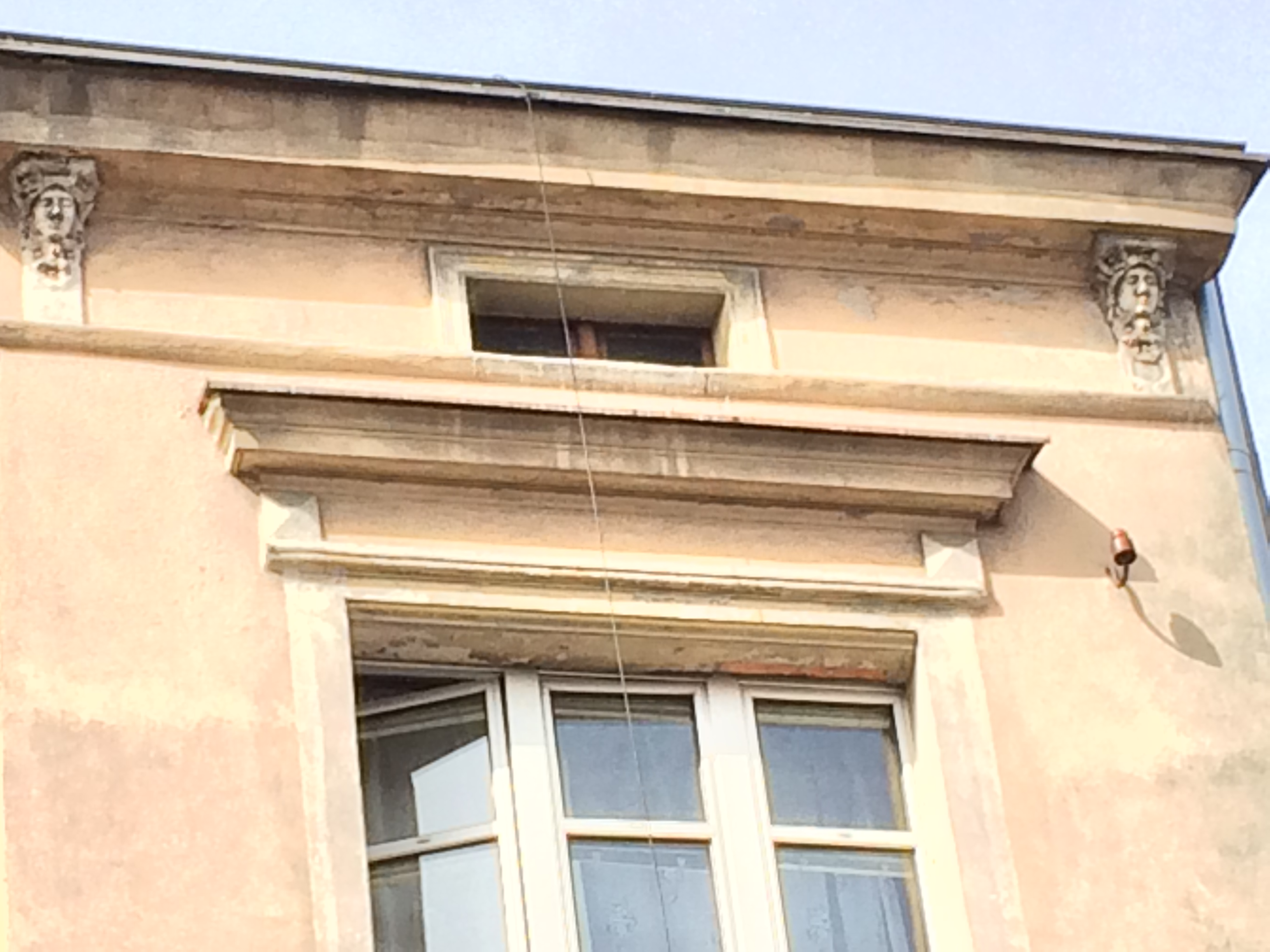
Head shaped corbels

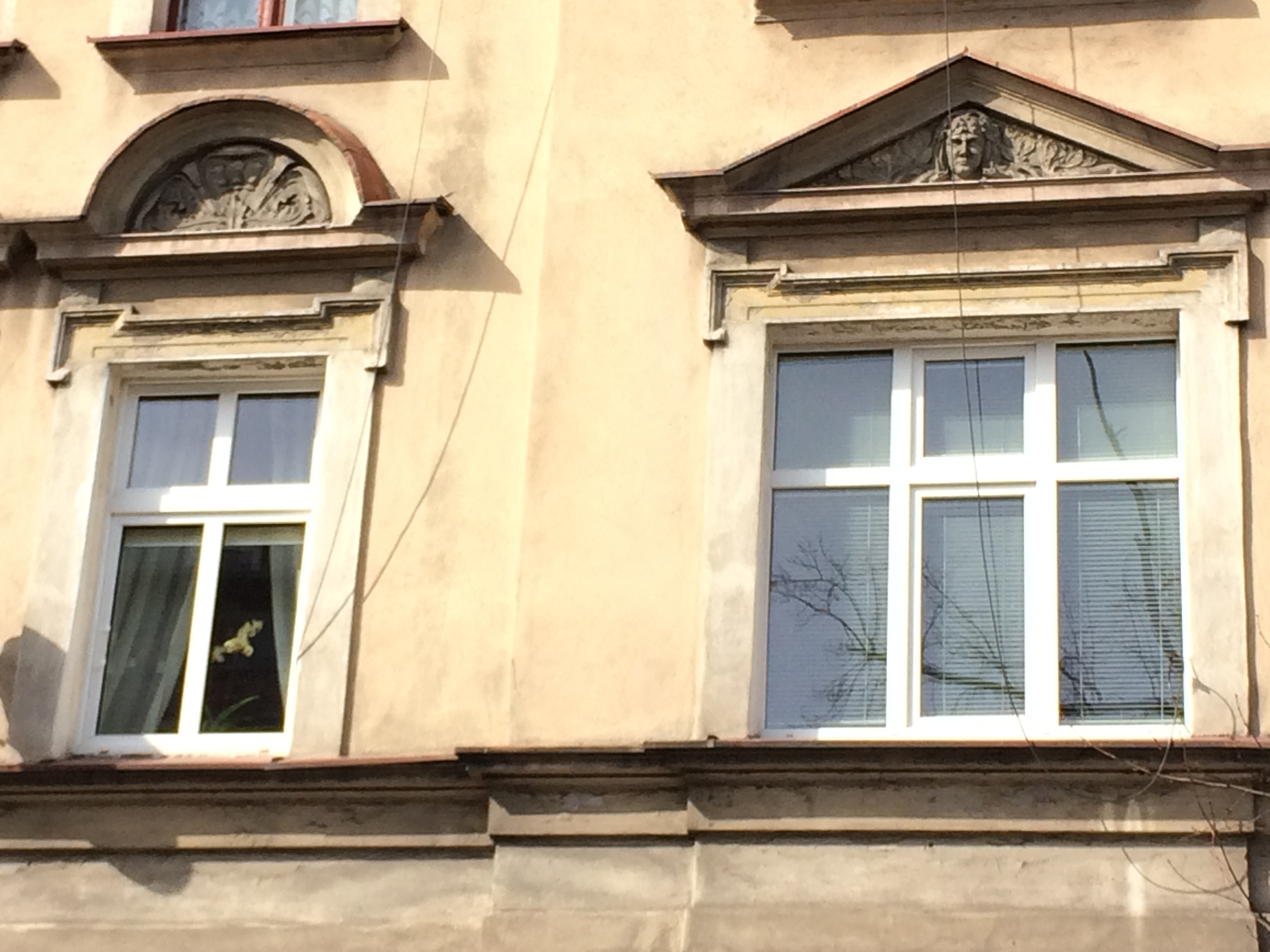
Adorned pediments

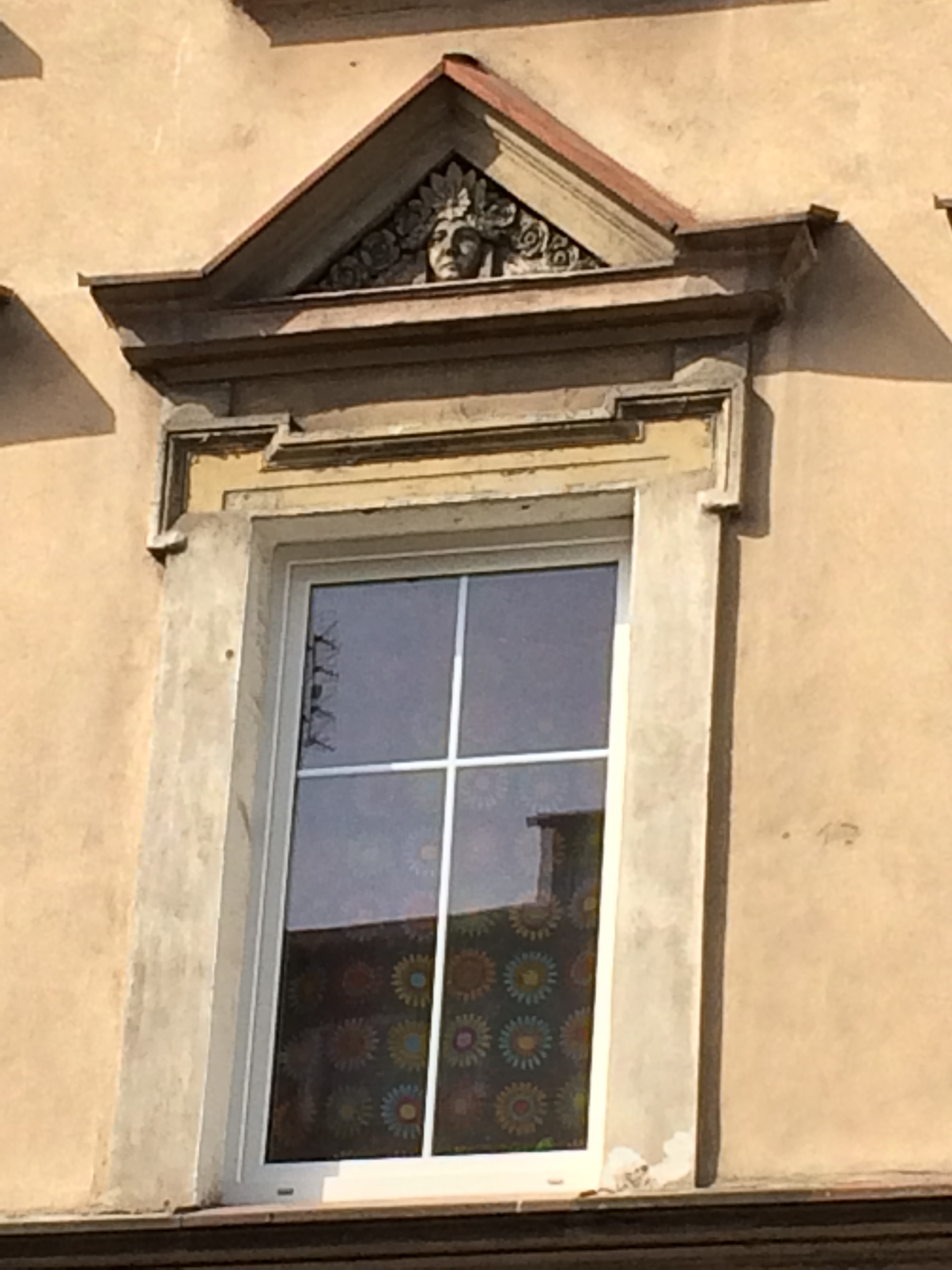
Detail of a figure

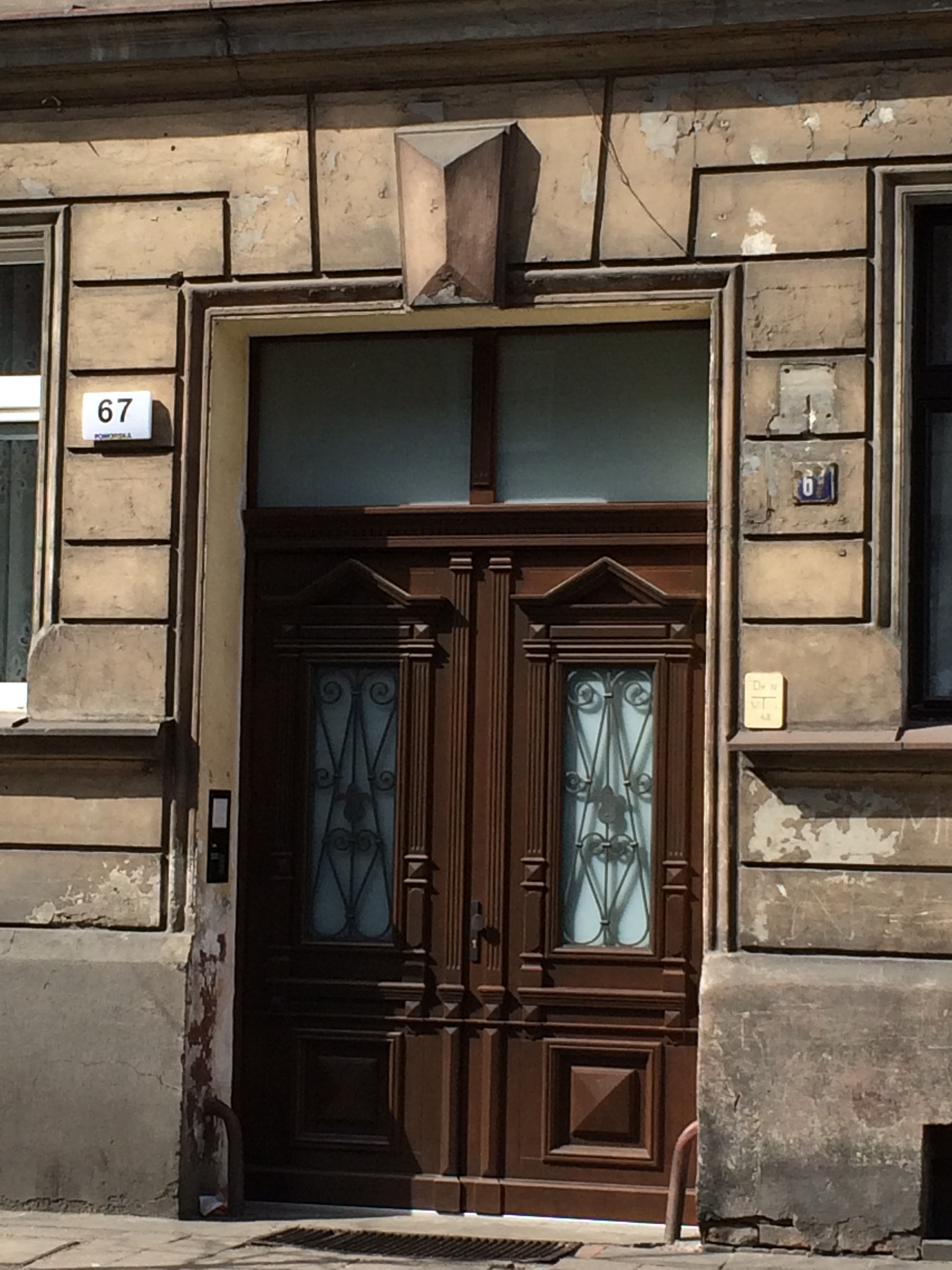
Main gate

=== Mural on the back of building at 68 ===
The author of the mural is the Colombian painter Juan Sebastian Jimenez (pseudonym SEPC). Created in 2019 as part of the edition of the "Vintage Photo Festival", the artist represented there Jadwiga Szopieraj, a pioneering photograph in Bydgoszcz. SEPC used the negative technique, the final effect is only visible after inverting the colors.

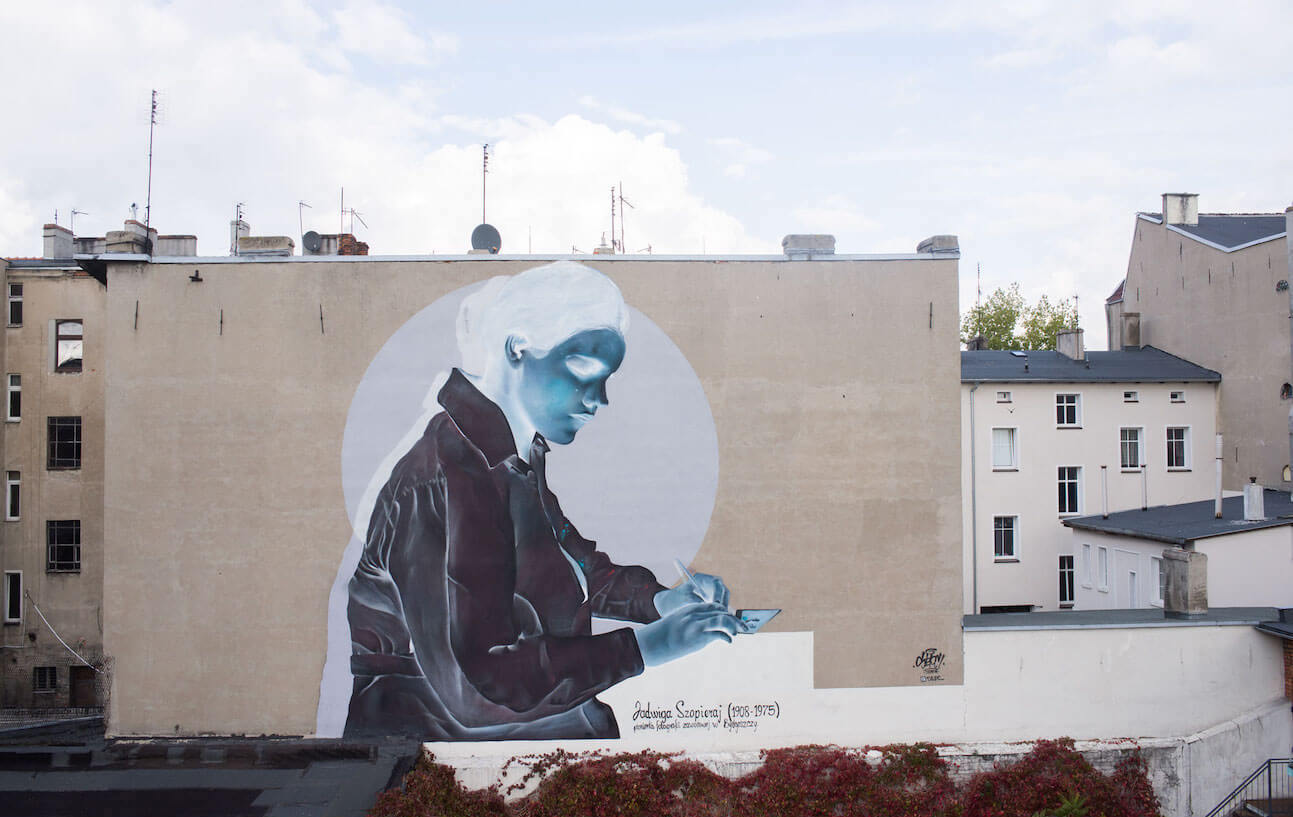
Jadwiga Szopieraj mural

=== Tenement at 70 ===
1896-98

Eclecticism & Neo-Renaissance

Mr Machalinski, a building contractors had the tenement at Rinkauerstraße 34 erected in 1898. One year later, the first owner was Oskar Wendt.

Current facade displays a lot of architectural motifs: slight avant-corps on each side, two massive balconies over the entry gate, a long corbel table at the top and, especially, many richly decorated pediments above windows.

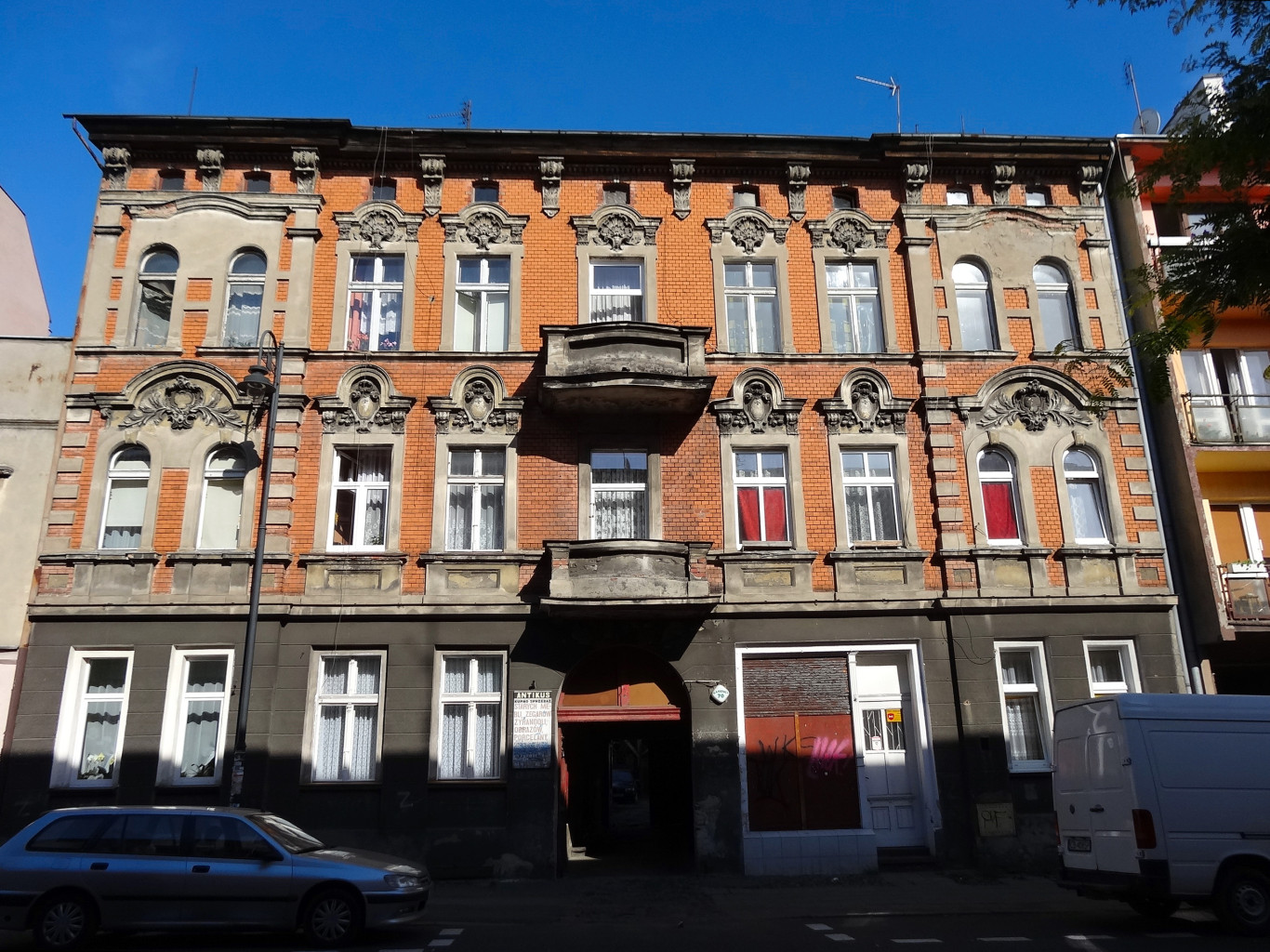
Main elevation on the street

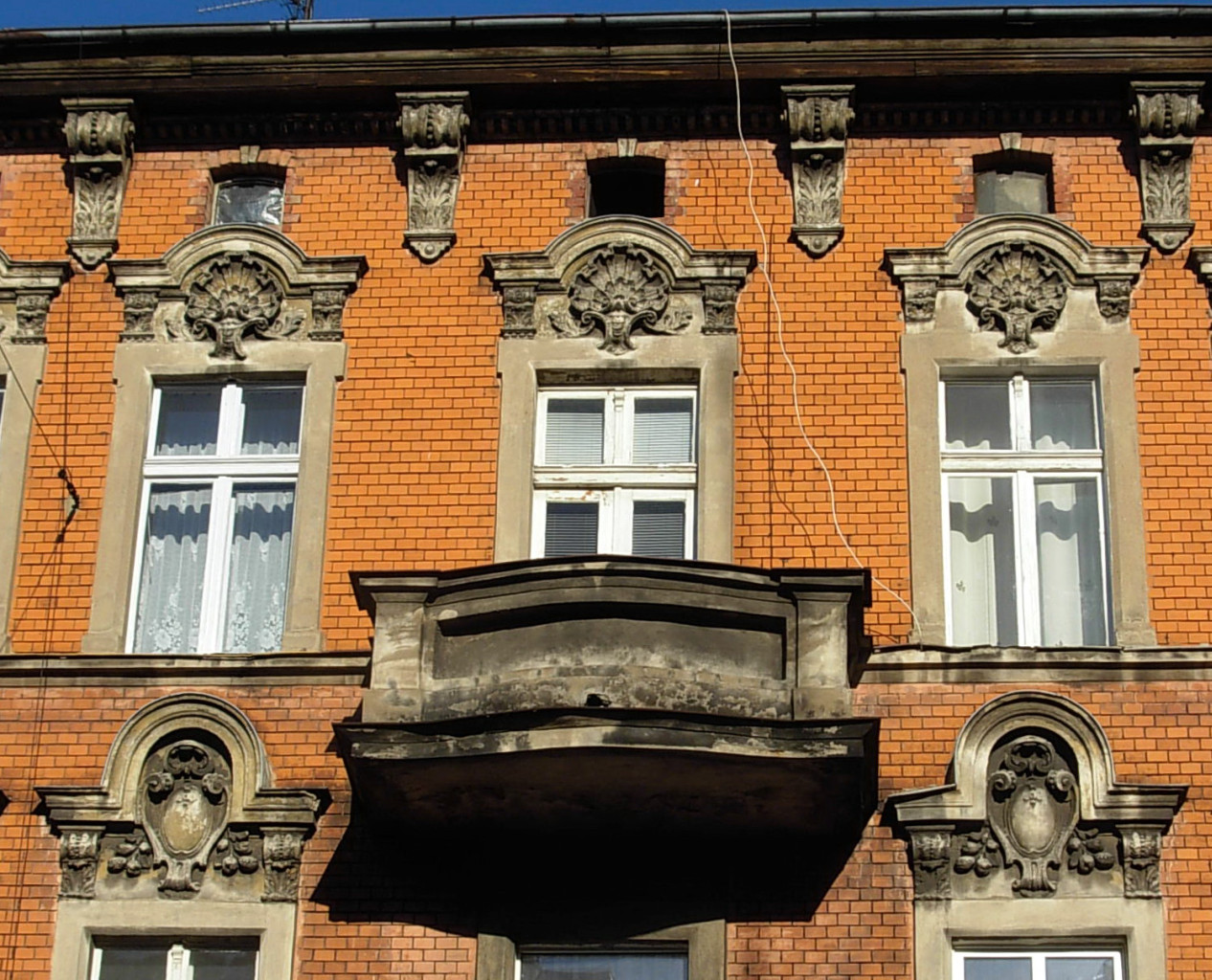
Balcony detail

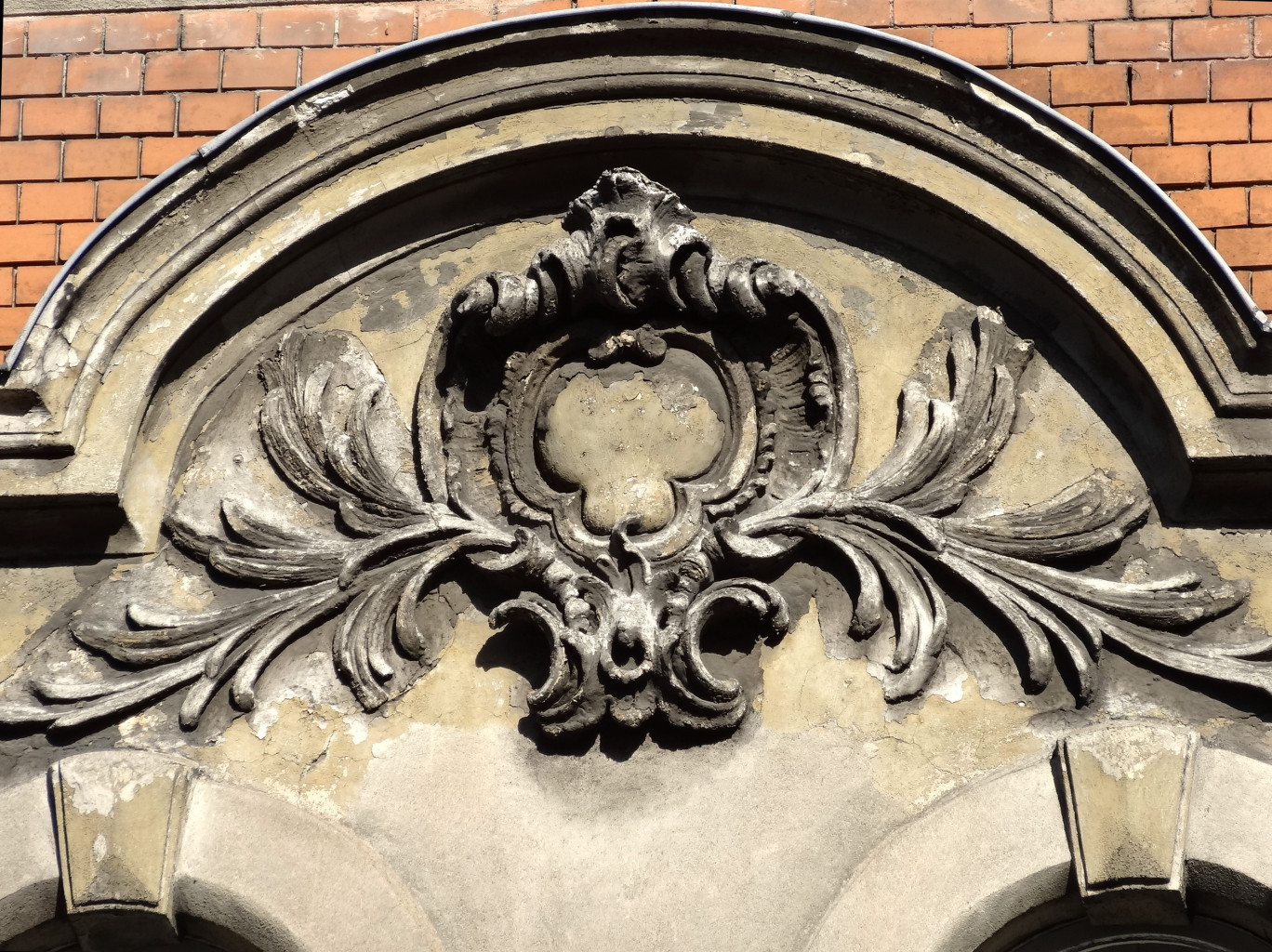
Adorned pediment

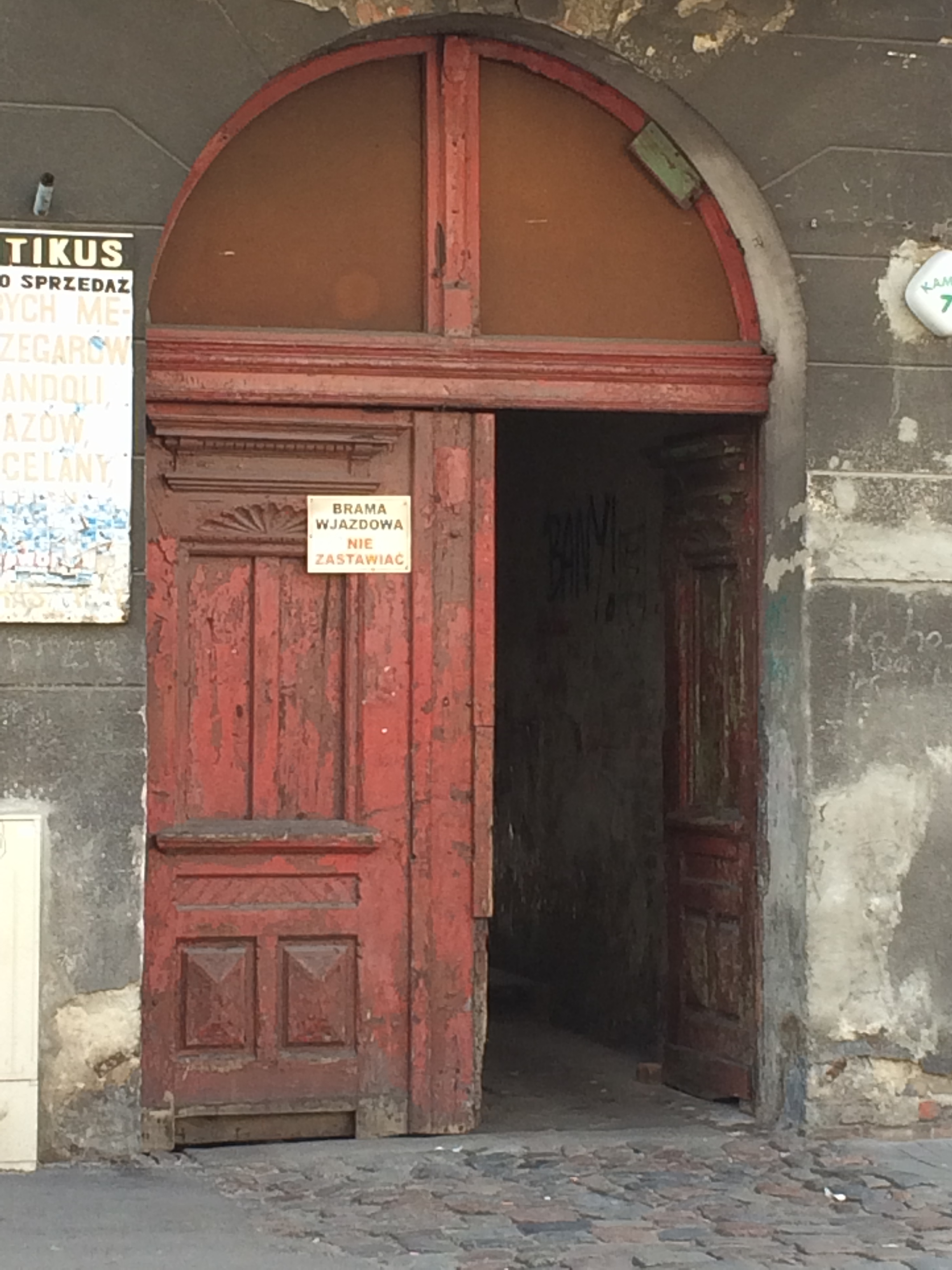
Main gate

=== Tenement at the corner with 21 Świętojańska street ===
1910–1912

Modern architecture

The initial tenement comprised two houses, one on Pomorska street (Rinkauerstraße 33) and the other on Świętojańska street (Johannisstraße 22). The former address was first owned by Bartholomäus Ferrari, a baker, in 1893, while for the latter, the first landlord was Theofil Krüger, a merchant, after completion of the actual corner house.

The facade lacks adornment, except the three pairs of balconies. On the roof, one can notice symmetrical display of various dormers: gable fronted, eyebrow, curved shaped gable wall ones and shed dormers.

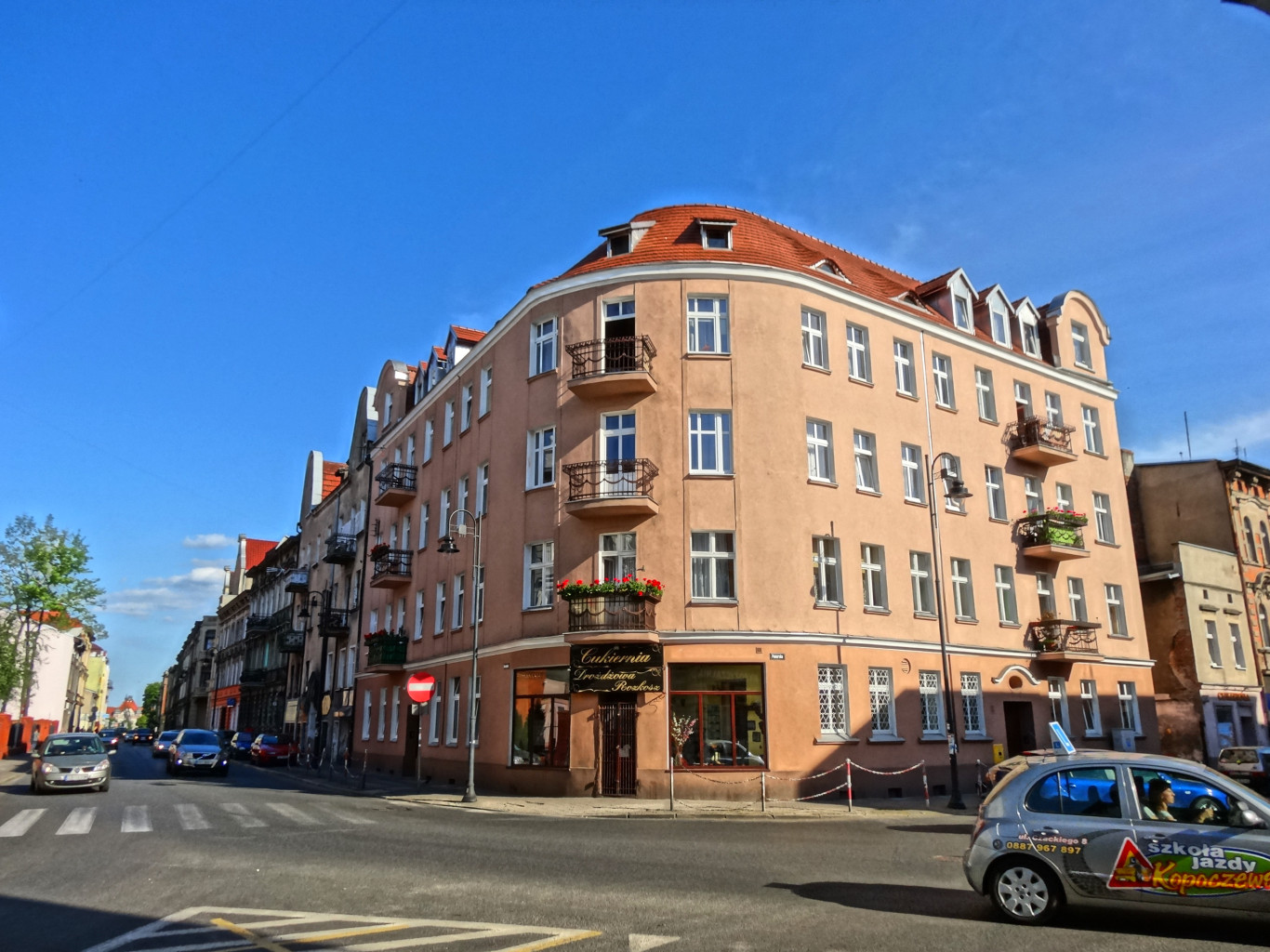
Corner view

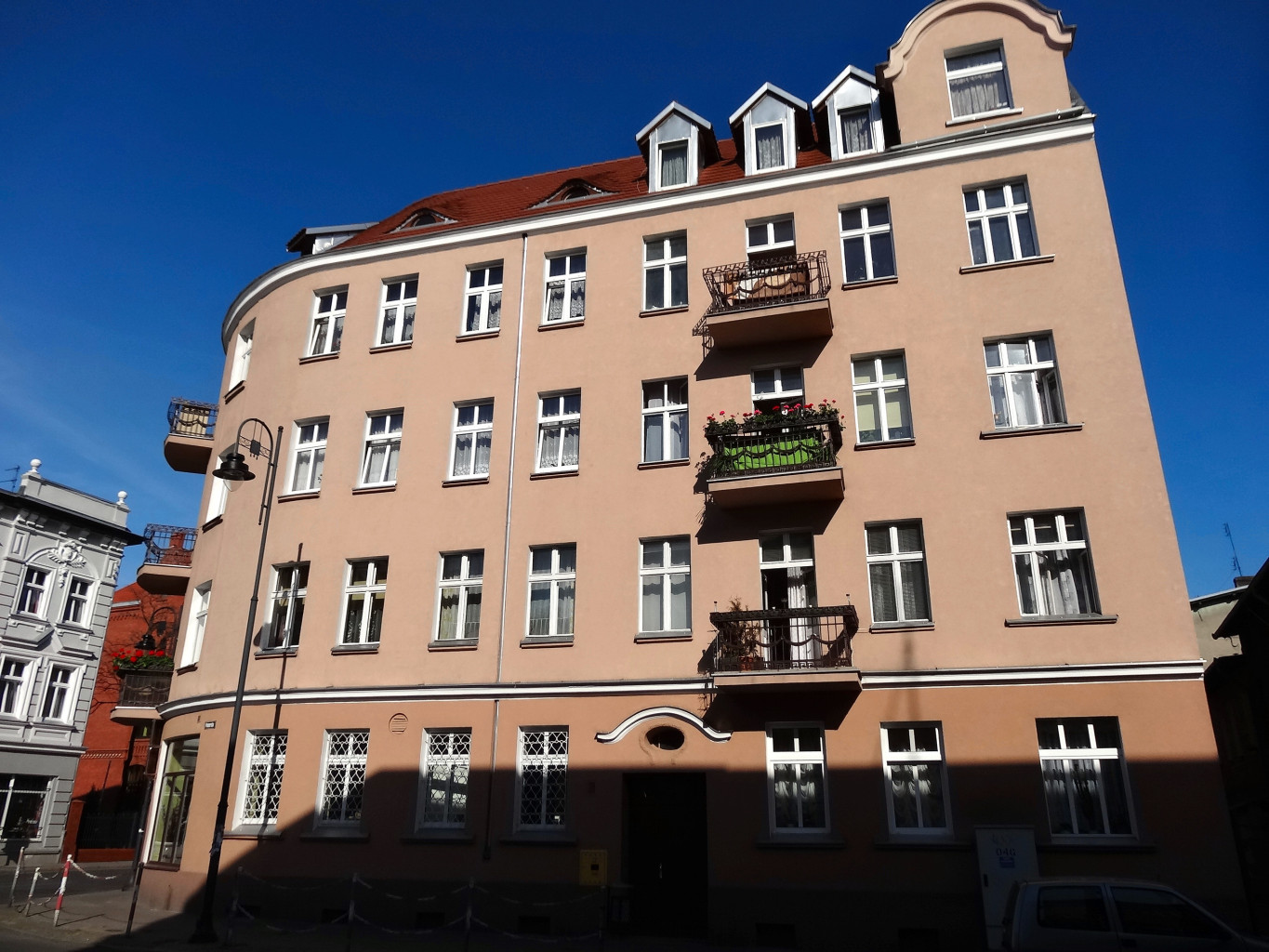
Main elevation on Pomorska

=== Tenement at 71, corner with Bocianowo street. ===
1894–1895

Eclecticism

Initial address was Verlängerte Rinkauerstraße 7 or Verlängerte Brenkenhöff Straße7 and it was first owned by Franziska Kowalkowska, a widow. David Kukuk ran the distillery on the ground floor in the 1910s. The Kowalkowski family lived in the tenement till the turn of the 20th century.

The elevations have been restored in 2021. One can make out cartouches, the tympanum above the gate and the pediments of the first floor bearing the initial "K", recalling the first landlord, "Kowalkowski".

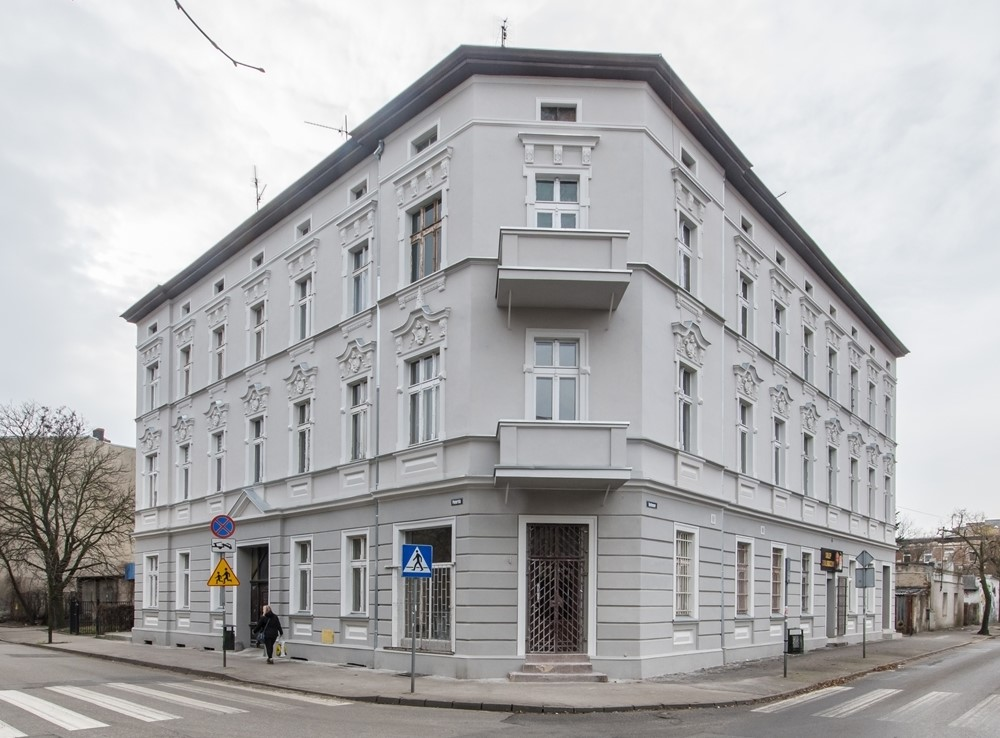
Renovated building, corner view

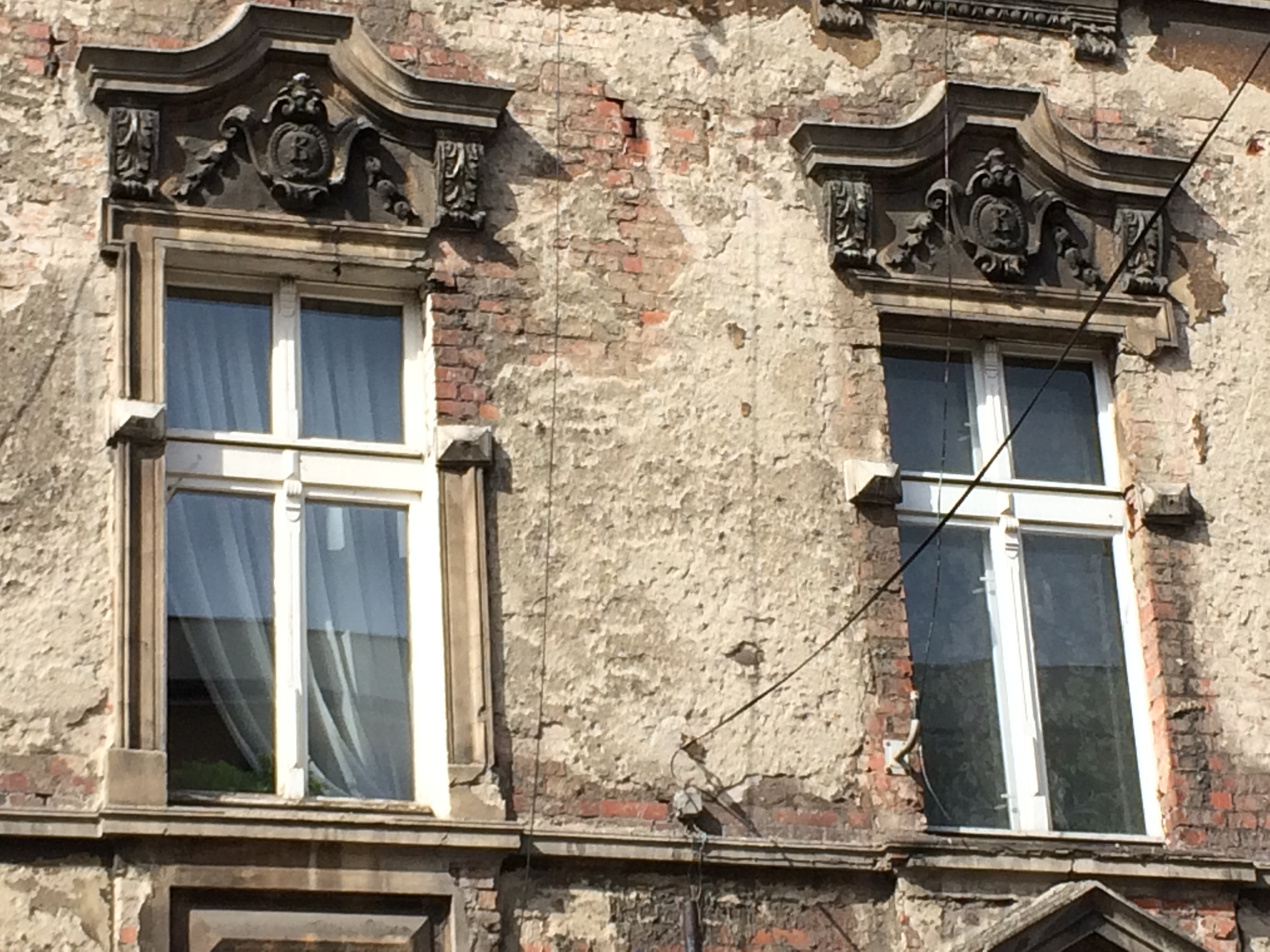
Pediment detail with the "K" initial, before refurbishment

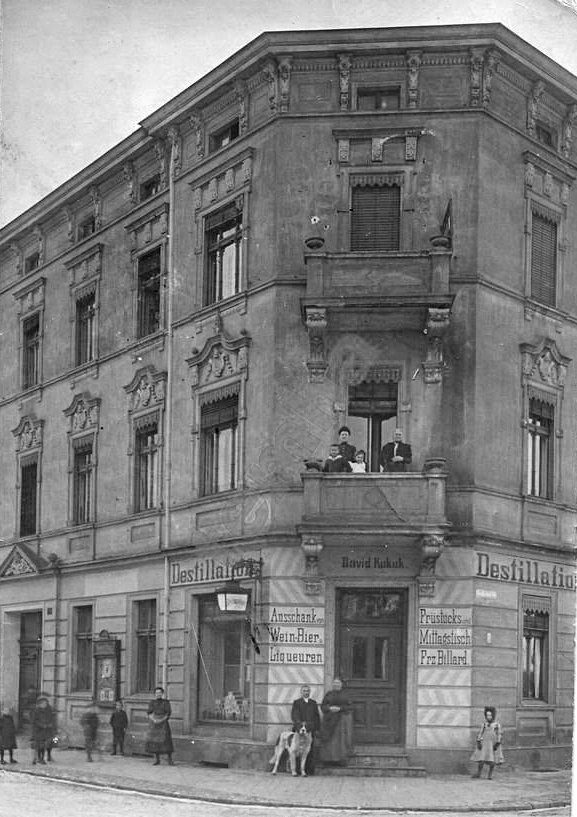
The tenement in the 1910s

=== Tenement at 74, corner with 22 Świętojańska street ===
1896–1897

Neo-Renaissance & elements of Neo-Baroque

Julius Hoffman, a secretary, was the first owner of the double house (Johannisstraße 1 and Verl. Rinkauerstraße 12) in 1897, the plot being empty till that time. Two years later, the tenement housed a hardware store. Today, the renovated building is a hotel, Hostel przy Świętojańskiej.

On the one hand, window symmetrical disposition, overall balanced facades, smooth stone walls are characteristics of Neo-Renaissance style, as well as ornately carved stone window trim varying in design at each story and small, square windows on top floor. On the other hand, some elements of Neo-Baroque are popping up on the facade decoration: very complex ornamentation of pediments and wrought iron balconies, large flower motifs on the second floor, topped on each side by a long plain balustrade standing on the roof.

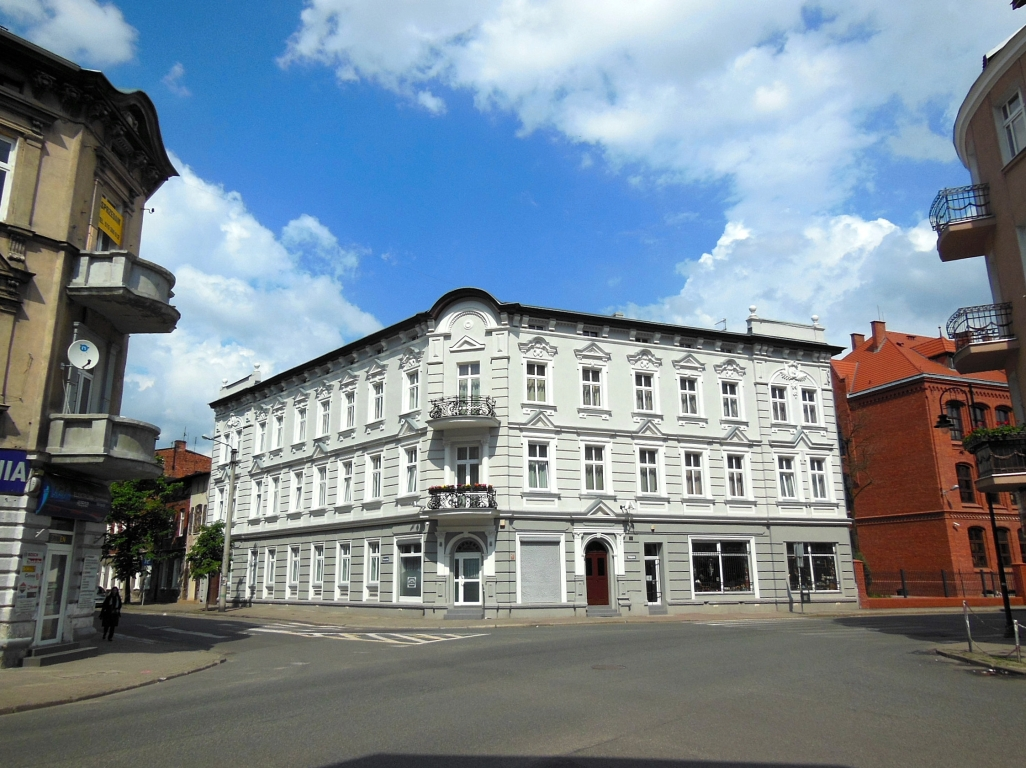
Corner view from street intersection

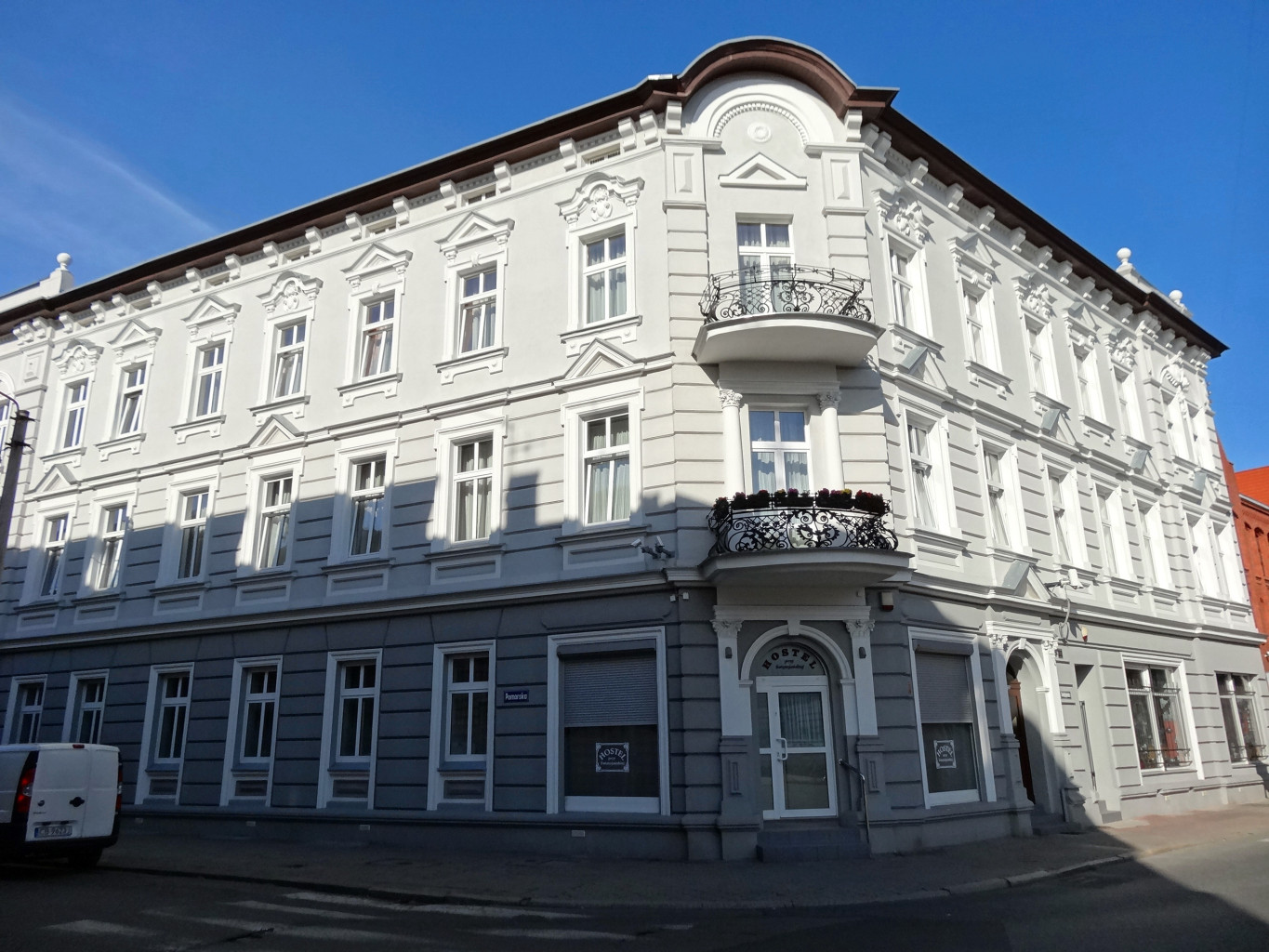
Main elevations

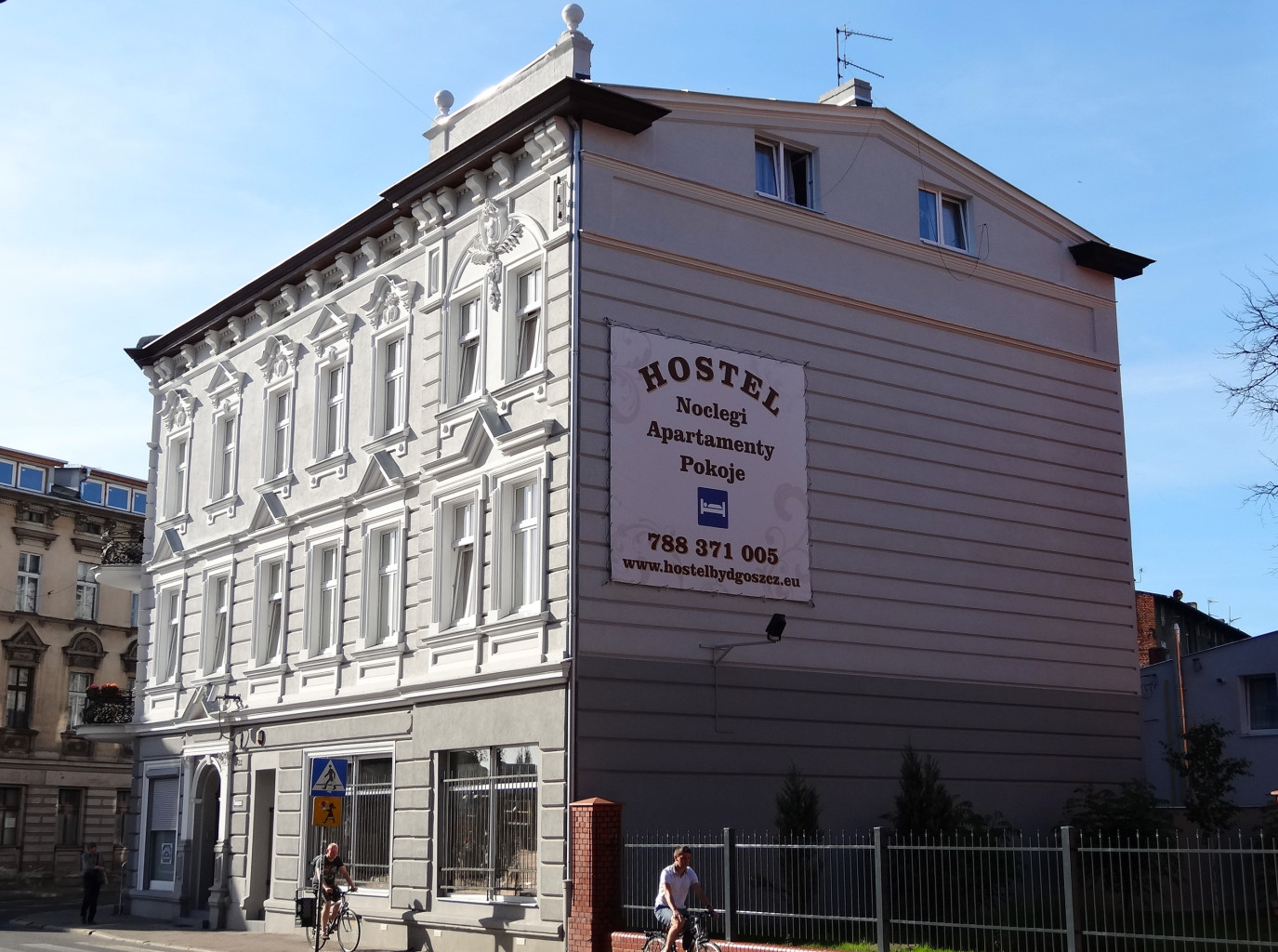
Facade on Świętojańska street

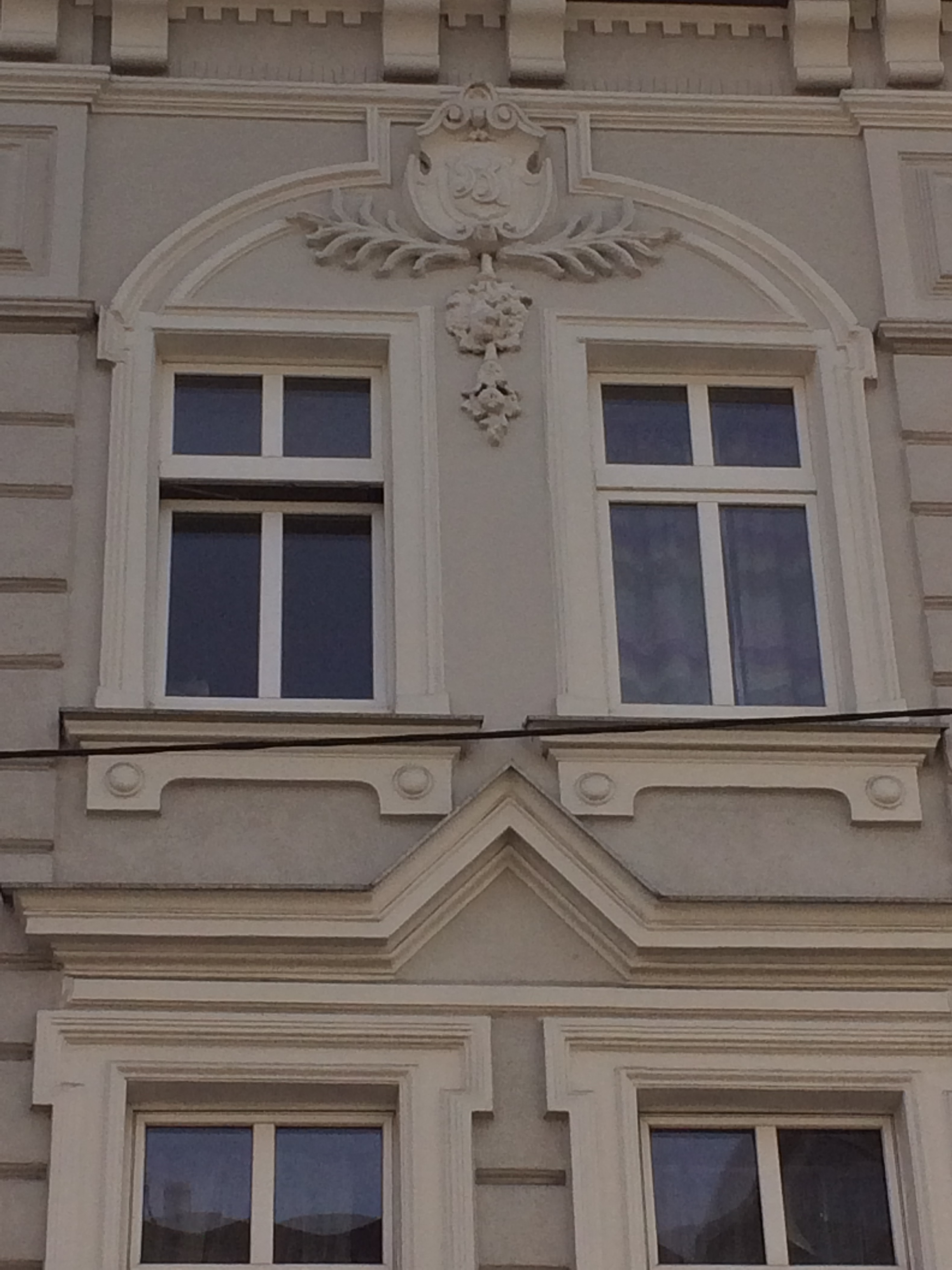
Motif detail

=== Londynek, at 75,77, 88A to 88H ===
1873–1878

Half timbered barracks

These buildings are the remnants of military barracks where was billeted the "Prussian Infantry Regiment Nr.148" (German: 5. Westpreußisches Infanterie-Regiment Nr. 148), from 1878 till the outbreak of World War I. The construction of the barracks was conducted by Albin Cohnfeld, a wealthy merchant of the city.

After 1920, premises housed the Polish 61st Infantry Regiment (Polish: 61 Pułk Piechoty). After 1920, premises housed the Polish "61st Infantry Regiment" (Polish: 61 Pułk Piechoty) till 1933. In 1936, the military fencing was razed and most of the barracks were transformed into a housing estate for the poor.

The area is called "Londynek" (Small London) for houses' likeness to some 19th century London half timbered buildings. Some edifices are today inhabited, others are being renovated as part of a local urban revitalization project.

The buildings are all half timbered edifices, infilled by brick. Such military architecture can be also found in Gdańska Street 147, since Bromberg was an important garrison city under Prussian rule.

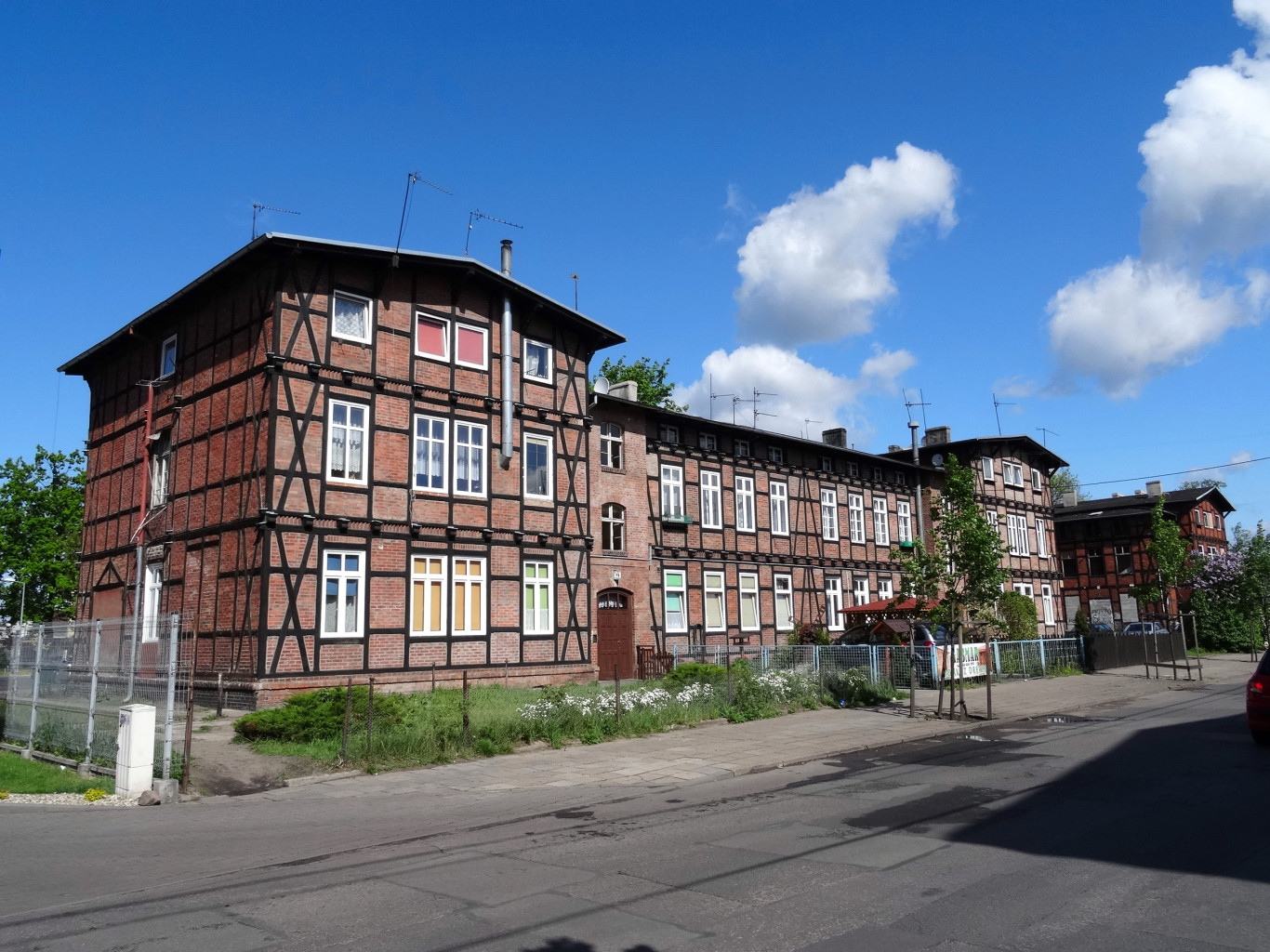
Houses at 75

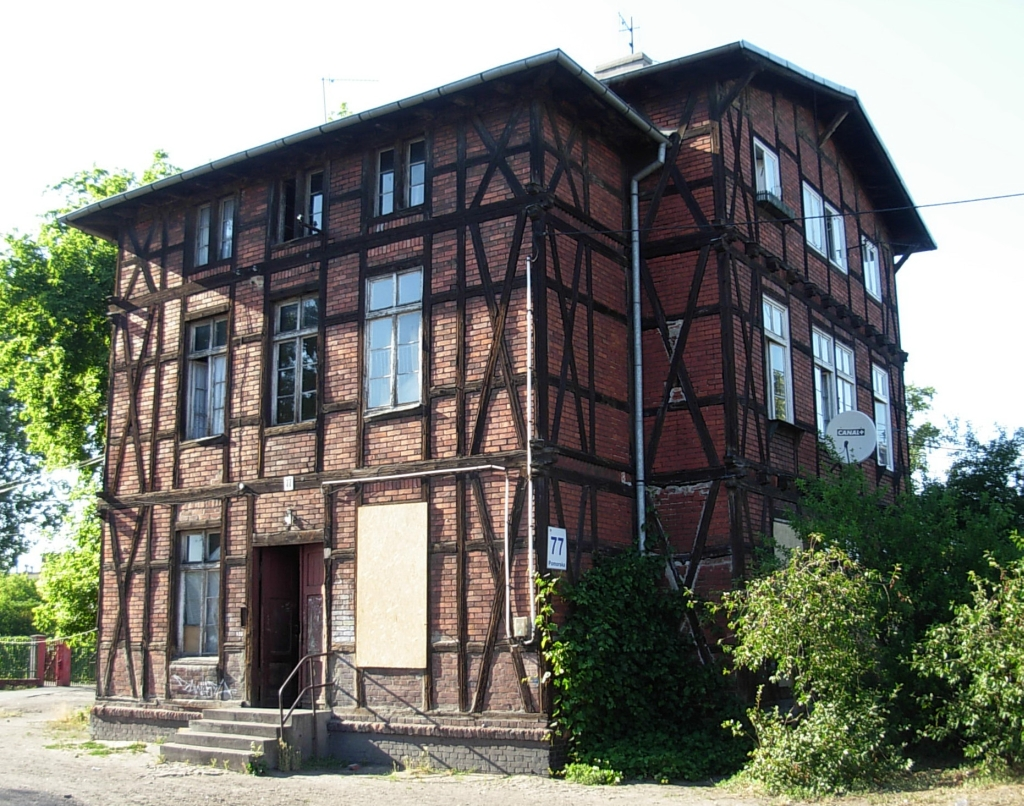
House at 77 (abandoned)

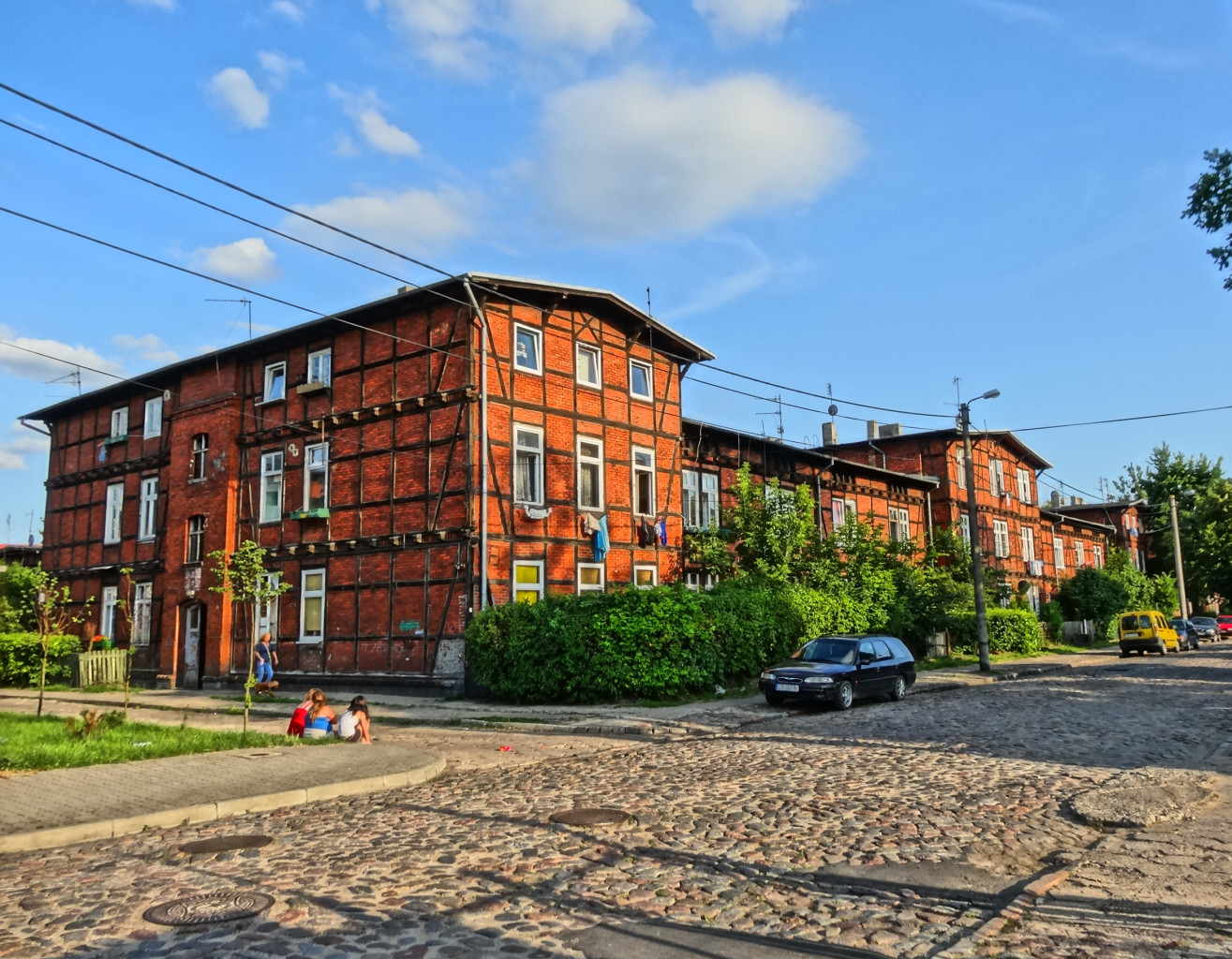
houses at 88

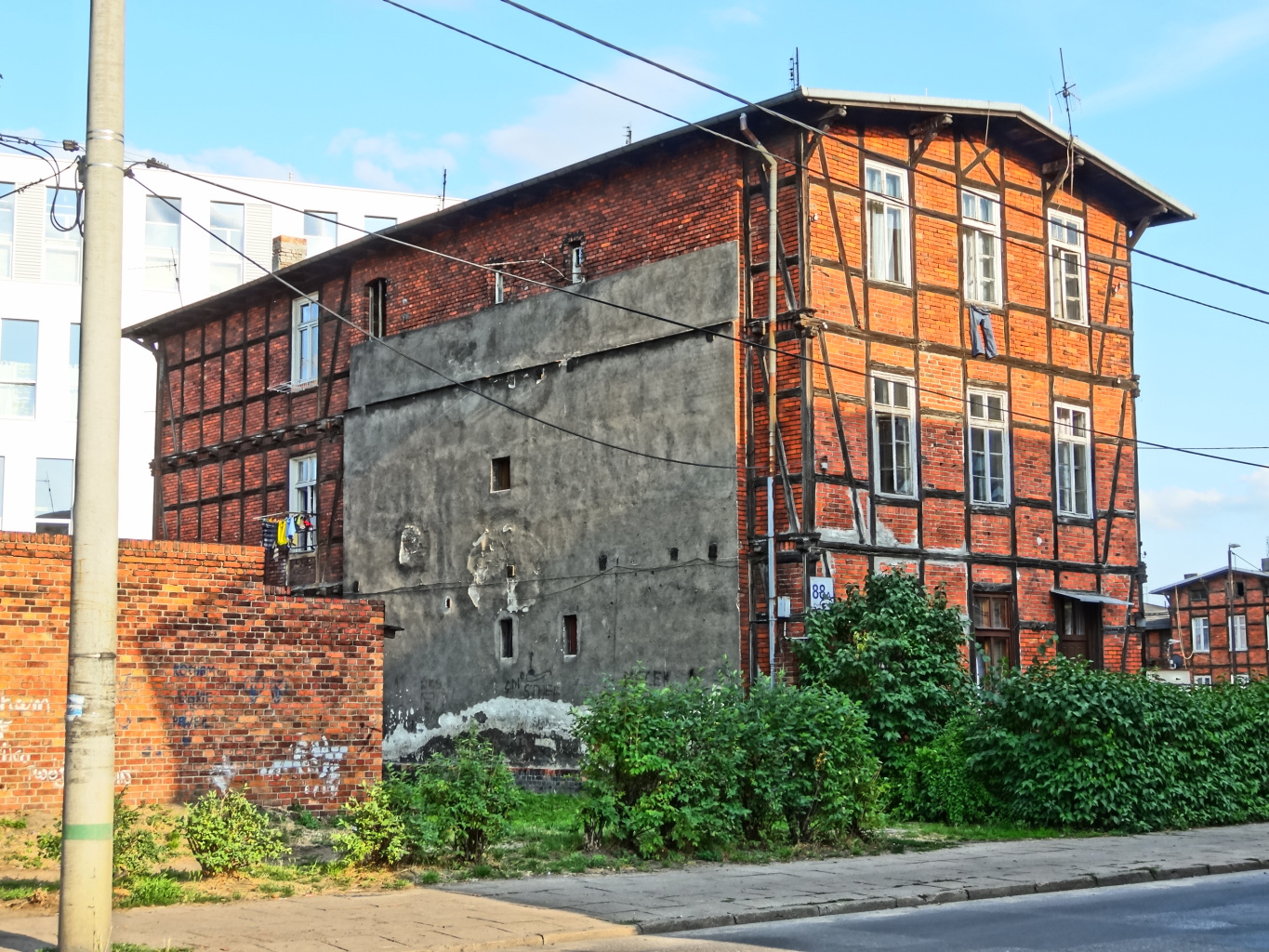
House at 88A

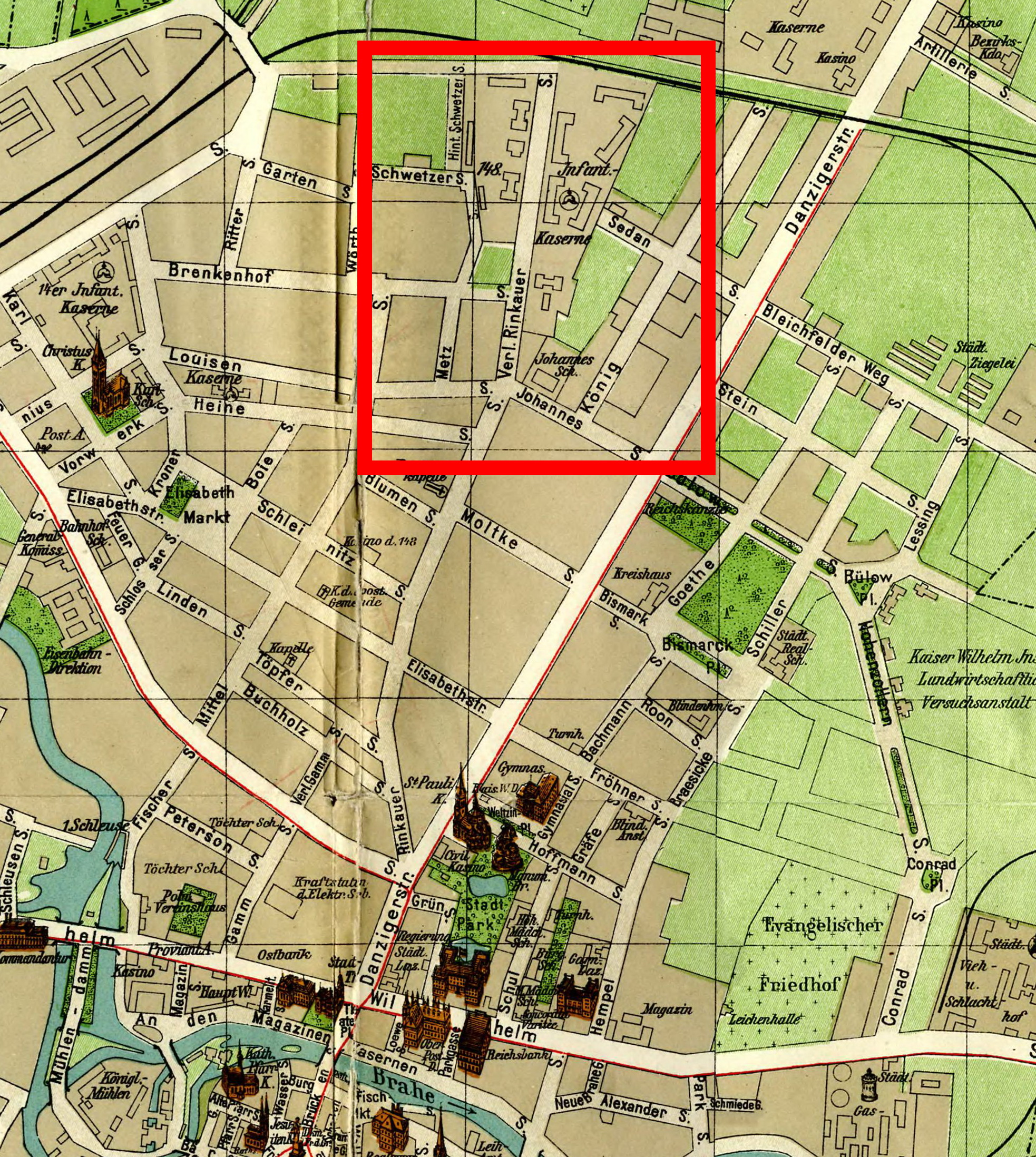
Location of the barracks on a 1914 map

== See also ==
- Bydgoszcz
- Józef Święcicki
- Fritz Weidner
- Bydgoszcz Architects (1850-1970s)

== Bibliography ==
- (in Polish) Jastrzębska-Puzowska, Iwona (1998). Poglądy artystyczne i twórczość bydgoskiego architekta Fritza Weidnera cz. I. Materiały do dziejów kultury i sztuki Bydgoszczy i regionu, z. 3. Bydgoszcz: Pracownia Dokumentacji i Popularyzacji Zabytków Wojewódzkiego Ośrodka Kultury w Bydgoszczy. pp. 44–55.
- (in Polish) Jastrzębska-Puzowska, Iwona (2000). Poglądy artystyczne i twórczość bydgoskiego architekta Fritza Weidnera cz. II. Materiały do dziejów kultury i sztuki Bydgoszczy i regionu, z. 5. Bydgoszcz: Pracownia Dokumentacji i Popularyzacji Zabytków Wojewódzkiego Ośrodka Kultury w Bydgoszczy. pp. 37–47.
- (in Polish) Kuberska, Inga (1998). Architektura sakralna Bydgoszczy w okresie historyzmu.. Materiały do dziejów kultury i sztuki Bydgoszczy i regionu, z. 3. Bydgoszcz: Pracownia Dokumentacji i Popularyzacji Zabytków Wojewódzkiego Ośrodka Kultury w Bydgoszczy. pp. 61–82.
