= Bolesława Chrobrego Street =

Street, Bydgoszcz, Poland, 19th-20th century

Coordinates: 53°07′54″N 18°00′00″E

Bolesława Chrobrego Street in Bydgoszcz
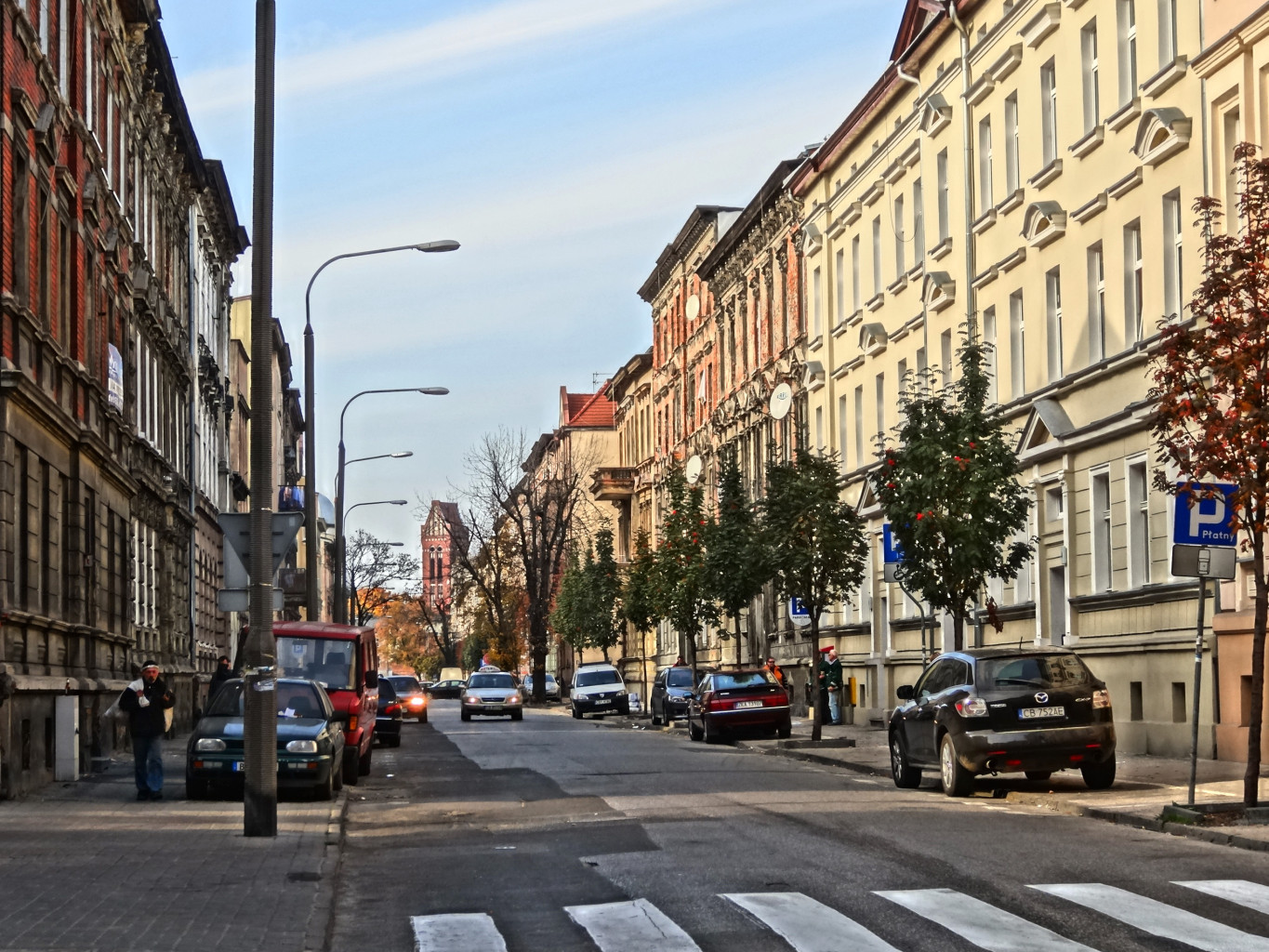
- Westward view

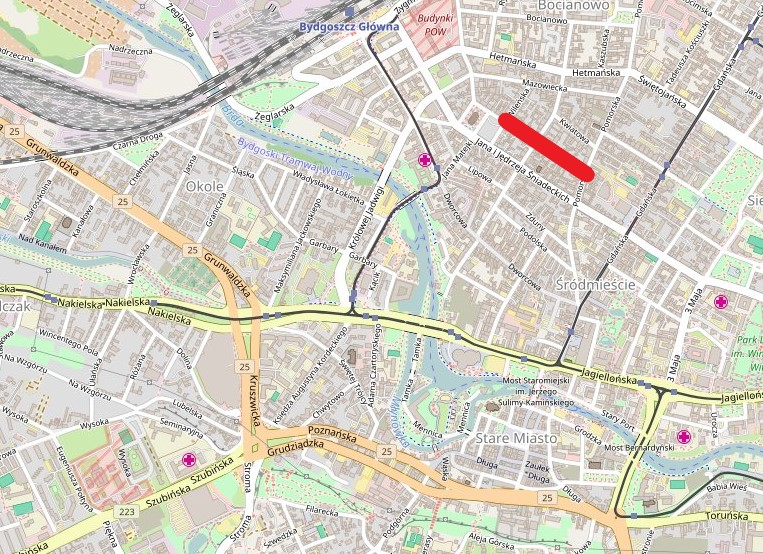
- Chrobrego street highlighted on a map
- Native name: Ulica Bolesława Chrobrego w Bydgoszczy (Polish)
- Former name: Schleinitz Straße
- Part of: Śródmieście district
- Namesake: Bolesław I the Brave
- Owner: City of Bydgoszcz
- Length: 350 m (1,150 ft)
- Width: ca. 10m
- Location: Bydgoszcz, Poland

Construction
- Construction start: Early 1870s

Chrobrego Street is an avenue located in downtown Bydgoszcz, Poland. Its frontage carries tenements which present a character of uniformity in their architectural features, several of them being listed at the Kuyavian-Pomeranian Voivodeship heritage list.

== Location ==
The street is laid parallel to Śniadeckich street, stemming from Pomorska street in the east to Piastowski Square in the west. On its way, it crosses Henryka Sienkiewicza Street.

== History ==
Like most of the thoroughfares in the area, Chrobrego street came to existence in the early 1870s, boosted by the development of the city in the second half of the 19th century, thanks to the rising of the industrial and railway activities. The axis counted only 5 built plots during the 1870s, then slowly reached 10 houses in the 1880s.

During its existence, the street had the following names:

- till 1920, Schleinitz Straße, after Alexander von Schleinitz (1807–1885), Prussian Foreign Minister from 1858 to 1861 and minister for the royal household from 1861 to 1885;
- 1920–1939, Ulica Bolesława Chrobrego;
- 1939–1945, Schleinitz Straße;
- Since 1945, Ulica Bolesława Chrobrego.

The current name refers to Bolesław I (967–1025), known as Bolesław the Brave (Polish: Bolesław Chrobry), who was Duke of Poland from 992 to 1025 and the first King of Poland in 1025. He was also Duke of Bohemia between 1003 and 1004 as Boleslaus IV

Within time, the house numbering in the street changed several times, either to account for the extension of the axis (in the mid-1880s and in 1900) or adapt the horse shoe system to the Polish rule (in 1920).

== Main areas and edifices ==
Tenement at 29A Pomorska Street, corner with Chrobrego street

1999

Modern architecture

Reconstructed at the end of the 20th century, the building mimics the brick edifices of the previous century, exposing a bay window. The plot has been built since 1895 but was registered under 19 Rinkauerstaße (today's Pomorska street).

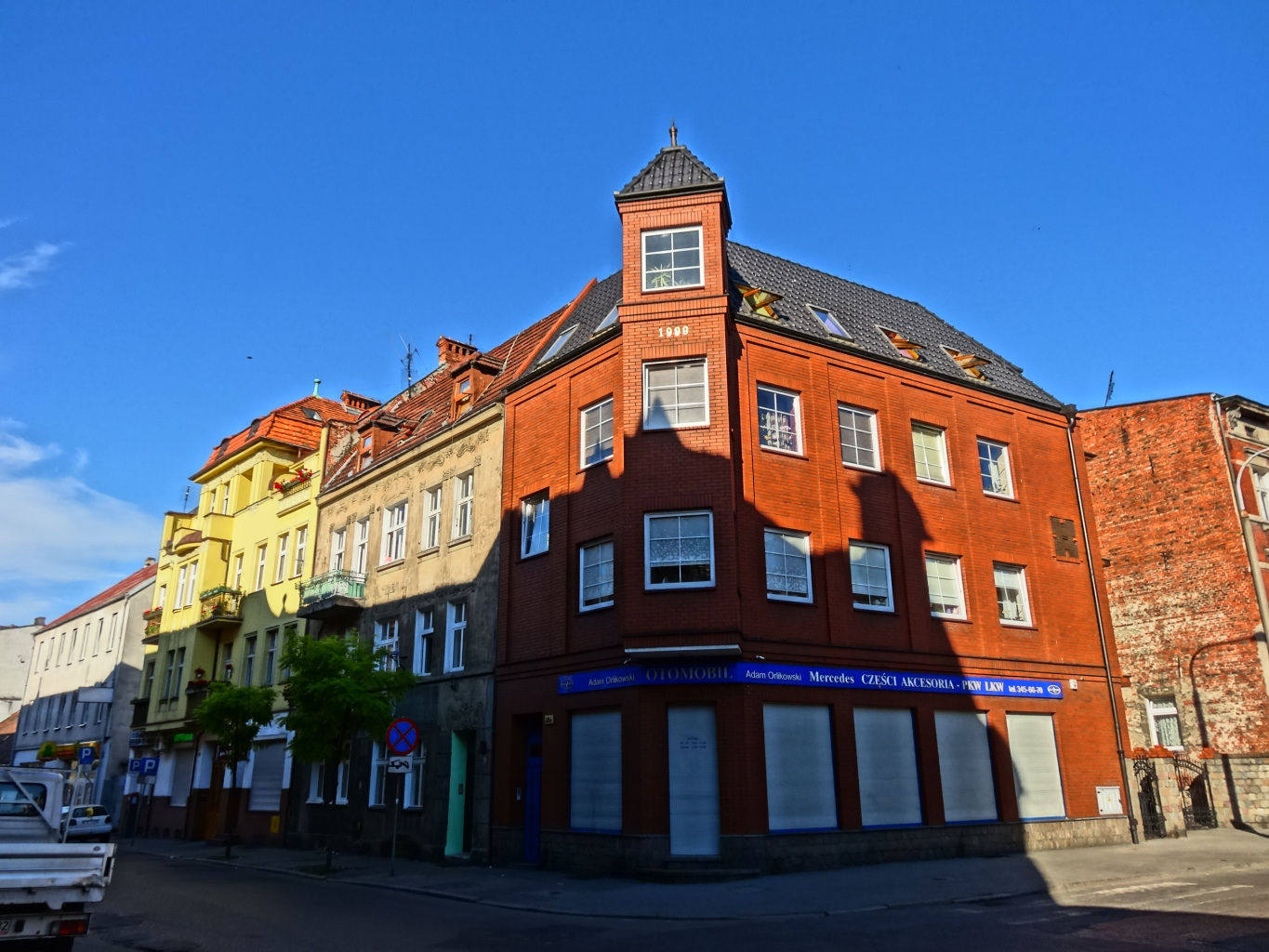
View from street crossing

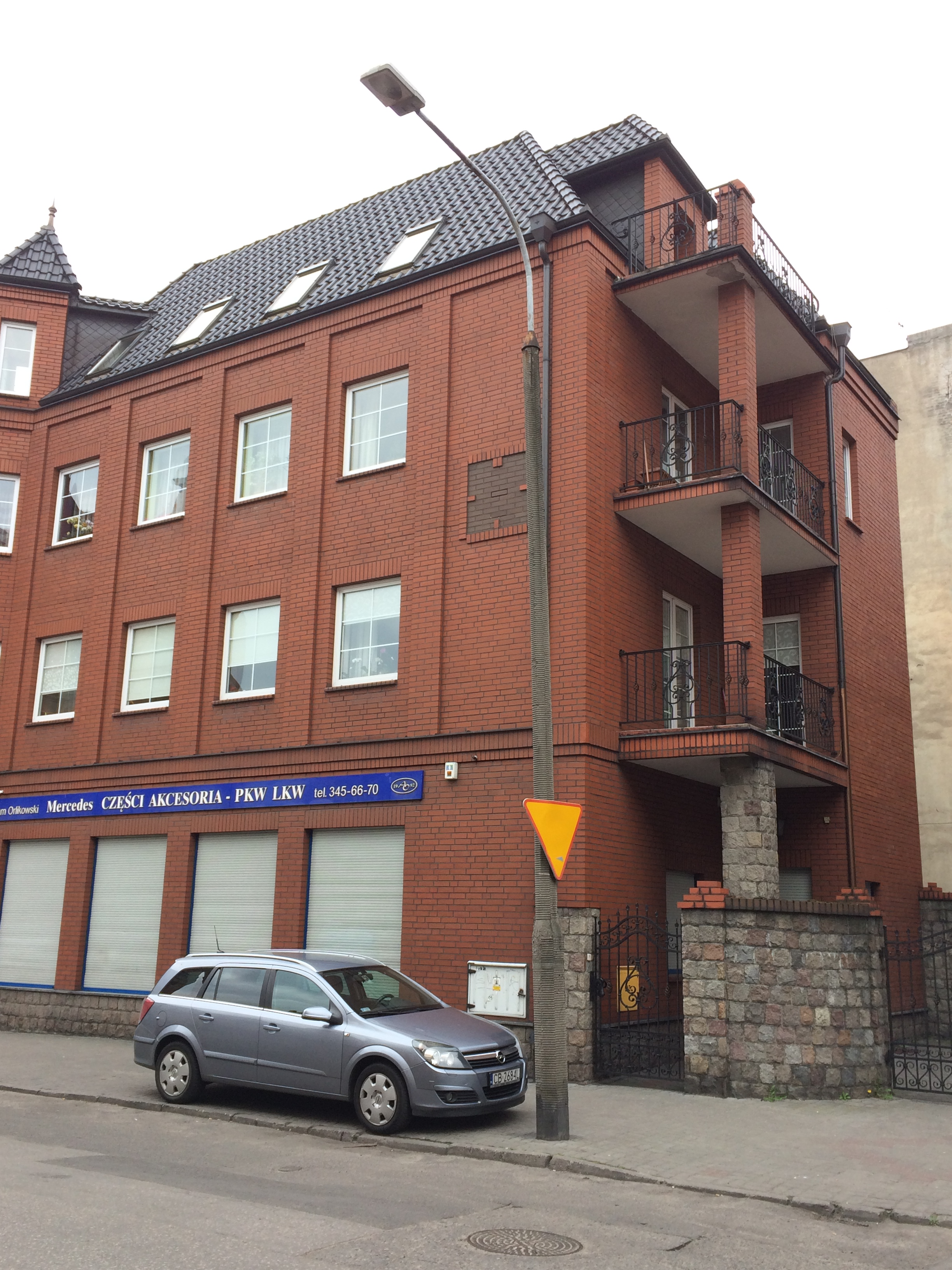
Facade on Chrobrego street

Tenements at 2/6

1890s: 1895 (Nr.2), 1893 (Nr.4 and 6)

Eclecticism

These three buildings, which elevations border the northern side of the street, have been commissioned and managed by the Beamten – Wohnungsverein GmbH Bromberg (Housing Association Bromberg) till 1920, then by the Bydgoska Spółdzielnia Mieszkaniowa (Bydoszcz Housing Cooperative). The aim of both bodies was to provide housing for fair prices to those in need, managing several dozens of tenements in various districts of the city.

The buildings present all eclectic features: Nr.2 stands at the corner with corner with 31 Pomorska Street, while Nos.4 and 6 share the same elevation. Fairly renovated in 2020, one can highlight the elaborate wooden decoration of the door at Nr.2 and the twin entrance portal at Nr.4/6, confining the doors inside a portal framed by two pilasters and topped by a high triangular pediment. In the backyard of the tenement at Nr.6 stands one of the oldest hand pumps of the city (from 1897): they were originally made of wood and replaced to iron ones in the 1880s.

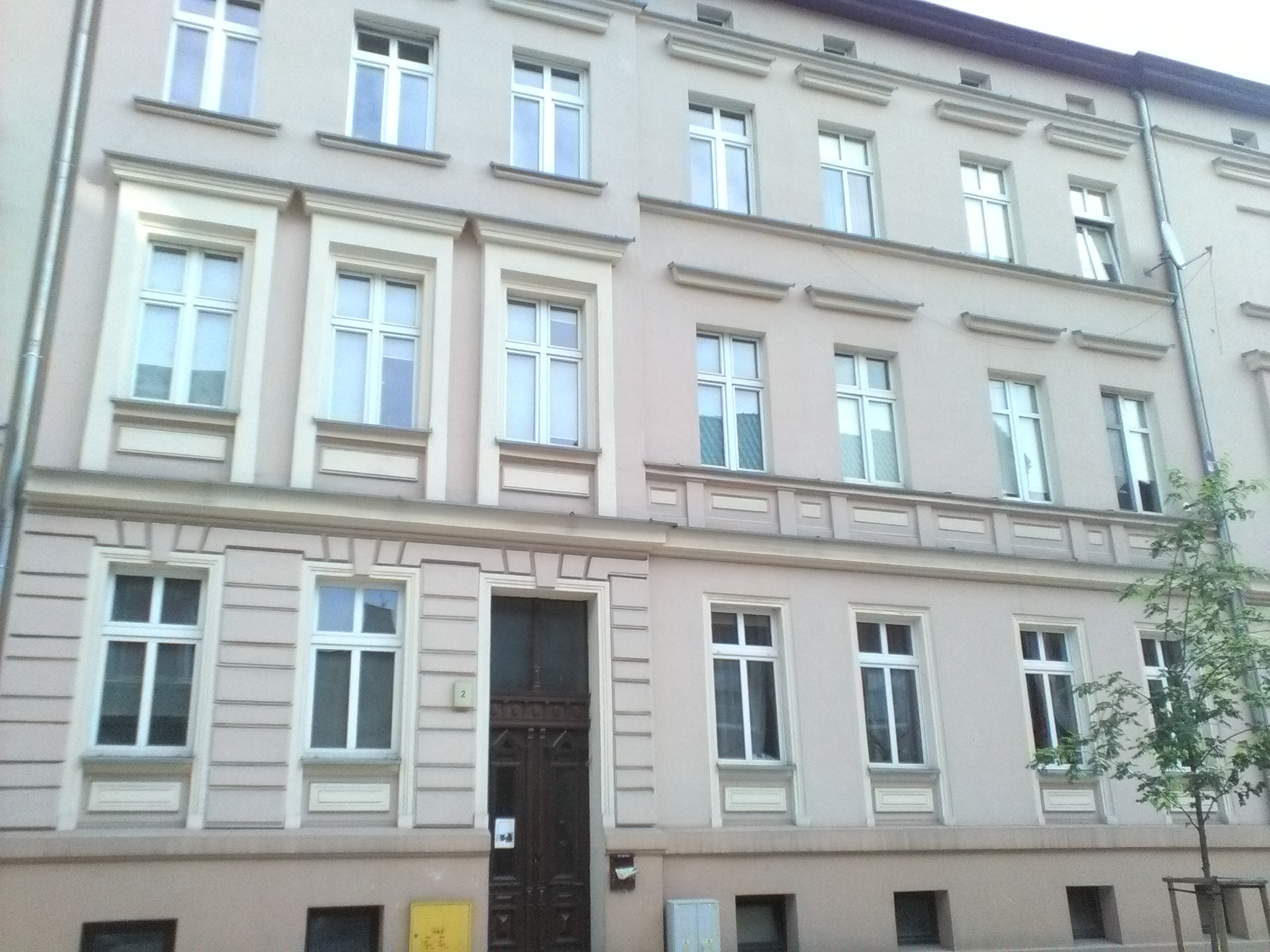
Facade at Nr.2

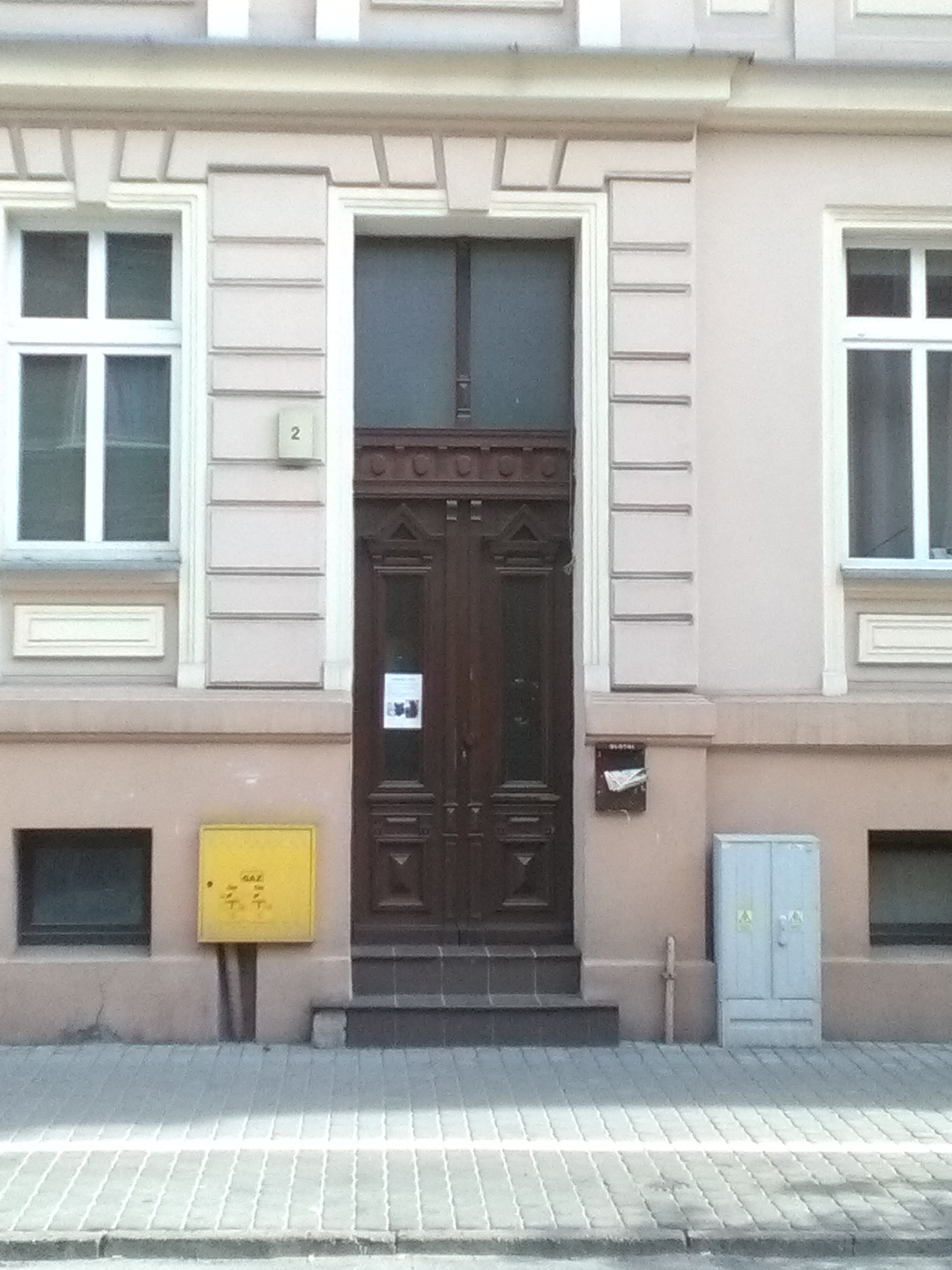
Adorned door at Nr.2

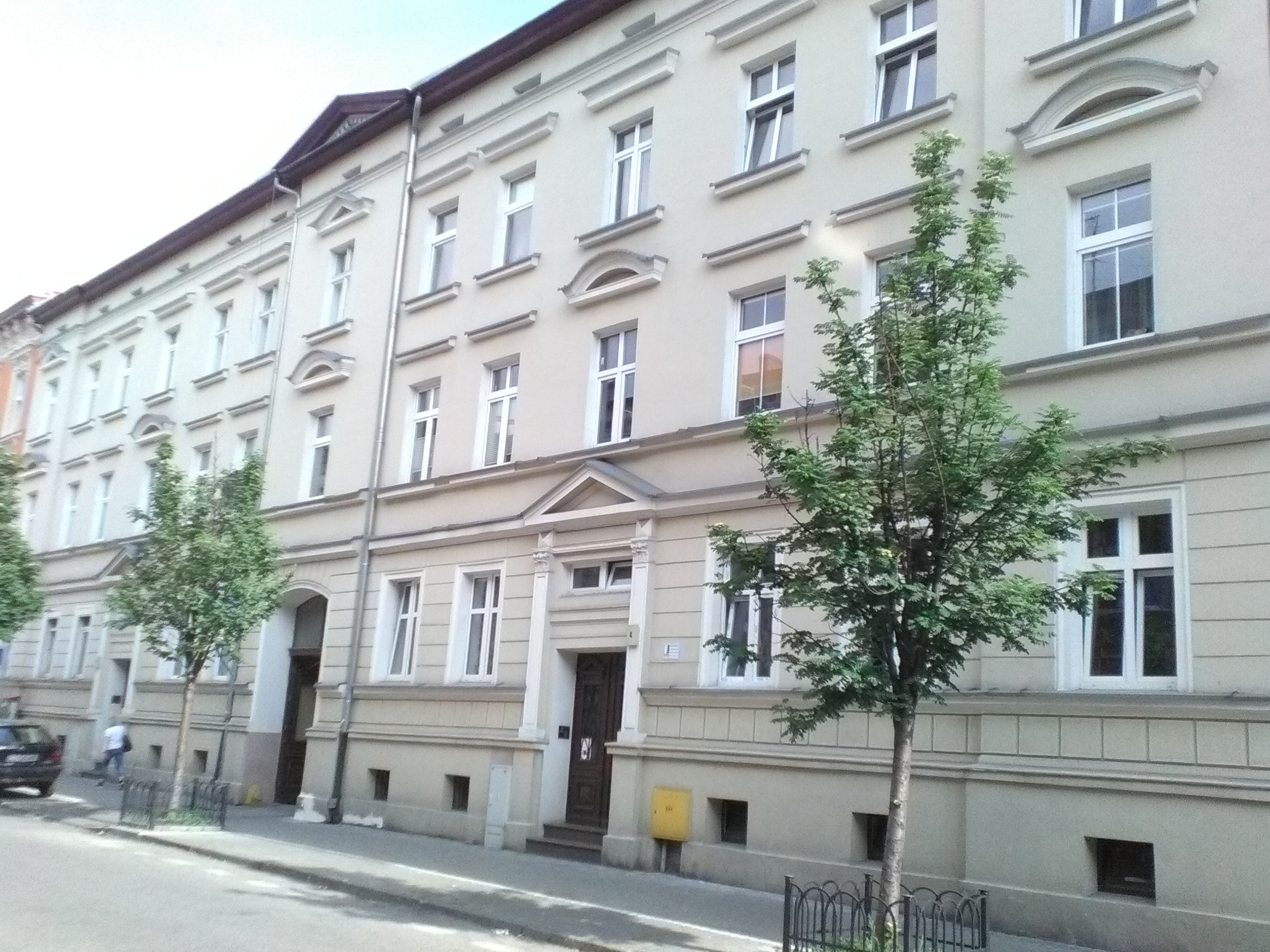
Elevations at Nr.4/6

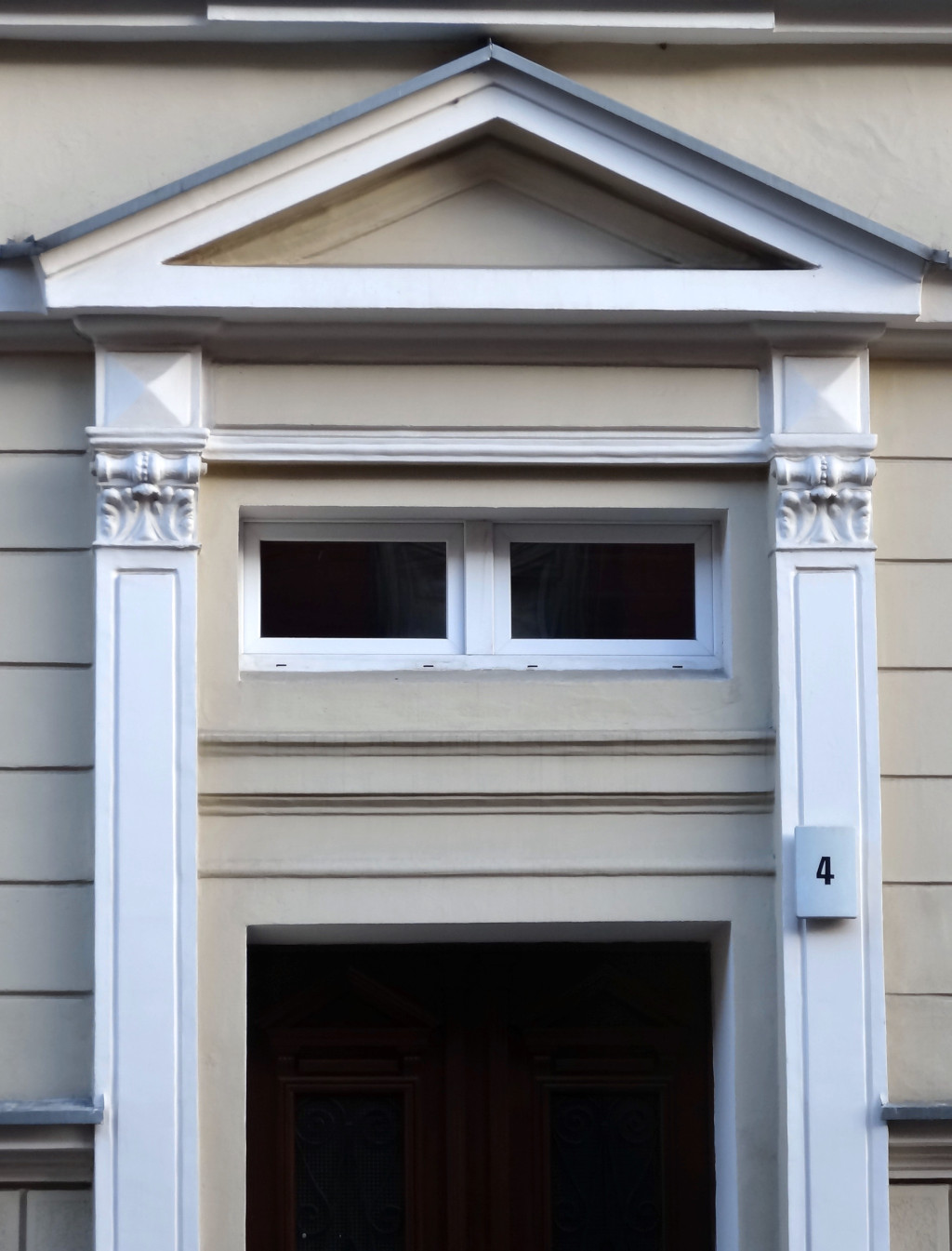
Portal at Nr.4

Robert Schliefs's tenement at 3

1895-1900

Eclecticism

Robert Schlief was an engineer-mechanic in electrics, but also working in electrical telegraphs, lightning conductors or power plants. Robert's family lived there till 1920 and the return of Bydgoszcz under Polish rule, they then transferred to nearby Zduny street.

The brick-and-stucco frontage displays bossage elements at ground level and bedecked corbels below the eaves. The slight middle avant-corps is crowned by a pediment bearing 1900, the construction date.

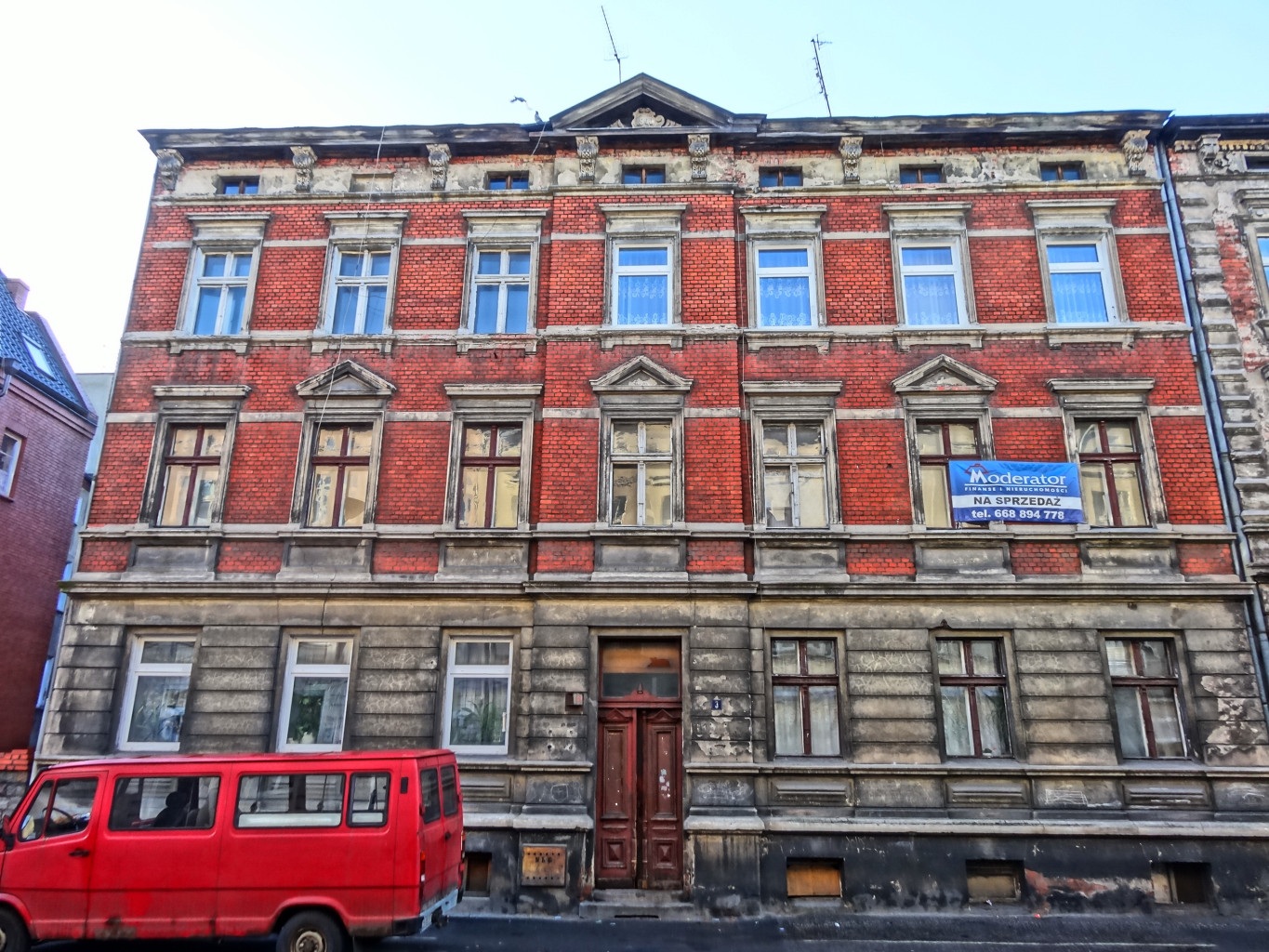
Main elevation from the street

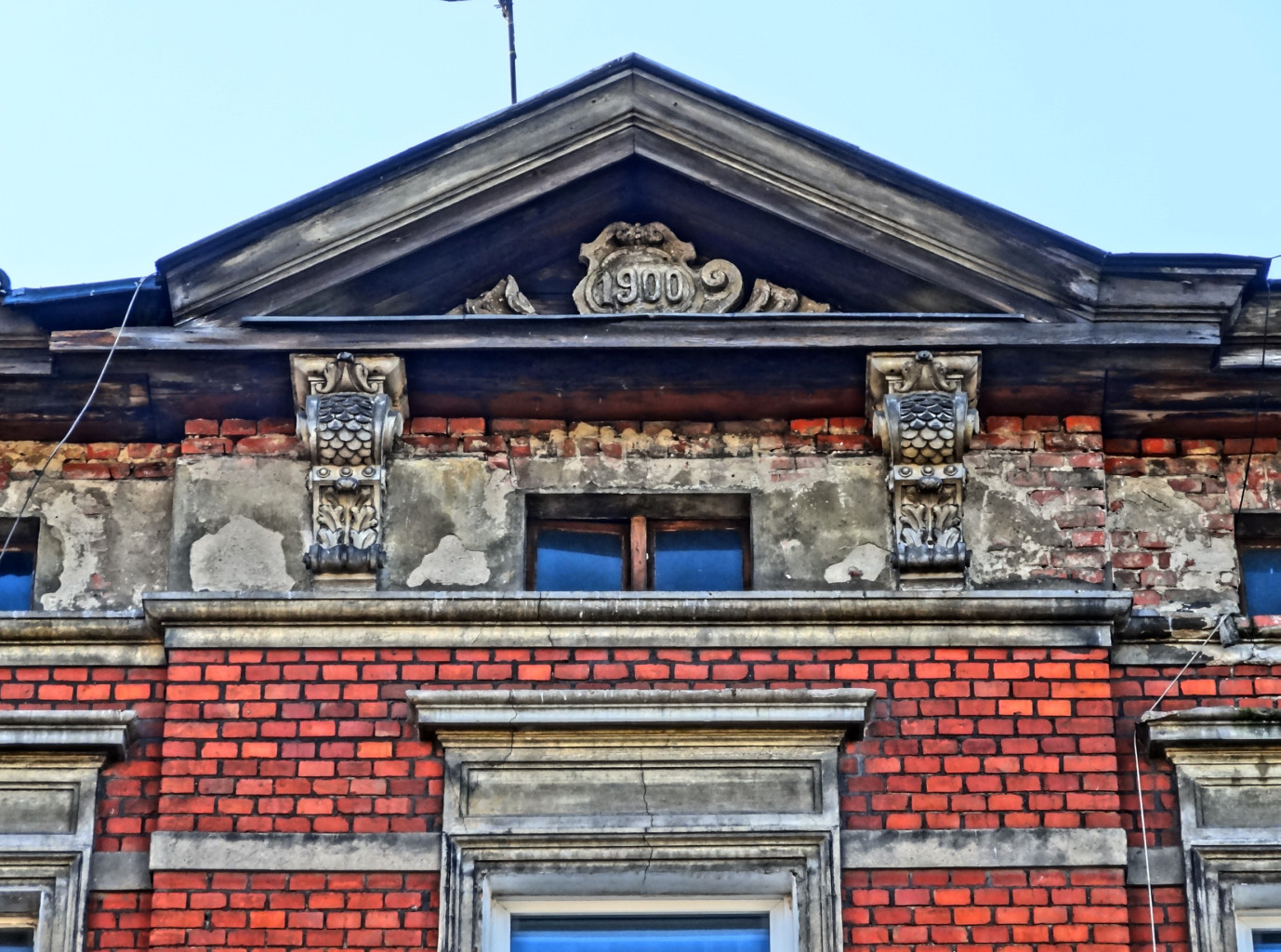
Top pediment

Tenement at 5

1893

Eclecticism

The parcel has received many different numberings during the Prussian period: 2, 1a then 1b Schleinitz Straße succeeded before 1920. Prior to WWII, the landlord was Jan Neumann, a rentier.

The building has been renovated in the framework of the program launched by the municipality in 2018–2019. The result reveals plethora of architectural details: mascarons above the windows on the ground floor, a classical style portal with Corinthian order columns and a pediment, adorned openings on upper floors and corbels beneath the eaves.

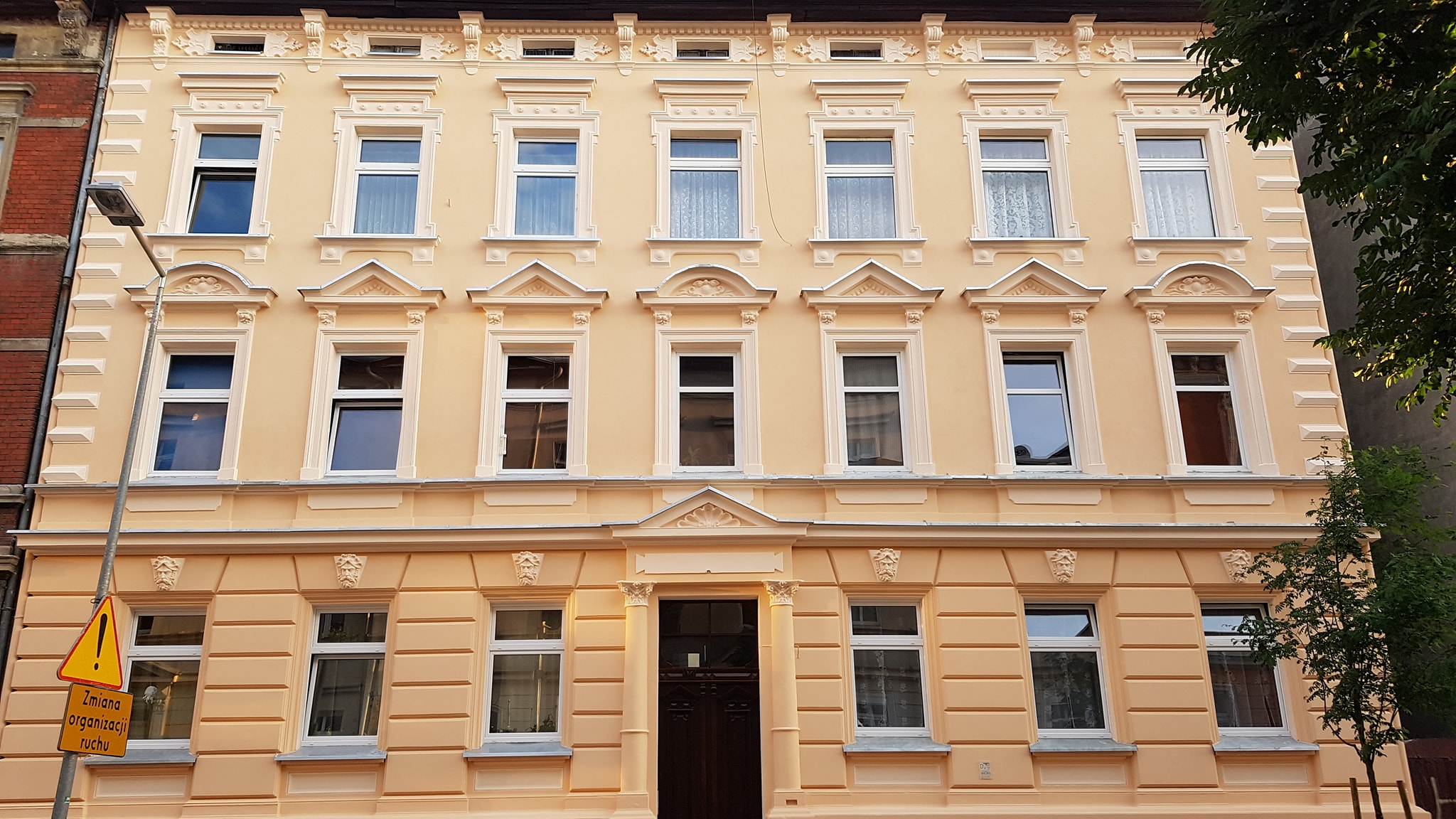
The elevation after renovation

Tenement at 7

1893-1894

Eclecticism

The commissioner of the tenement was Albert Backe, a freight trader, living at 12 Livonius Straße (today's Jana III Sobieskego street).

Although it dates back to a similar period of time, the eclectic frontage at Nr.7 differs somehow from the others with a double door offset entrance, round top windows on the ground floor and slender adorned pilasters highlighting the modest avant-corps above the door.

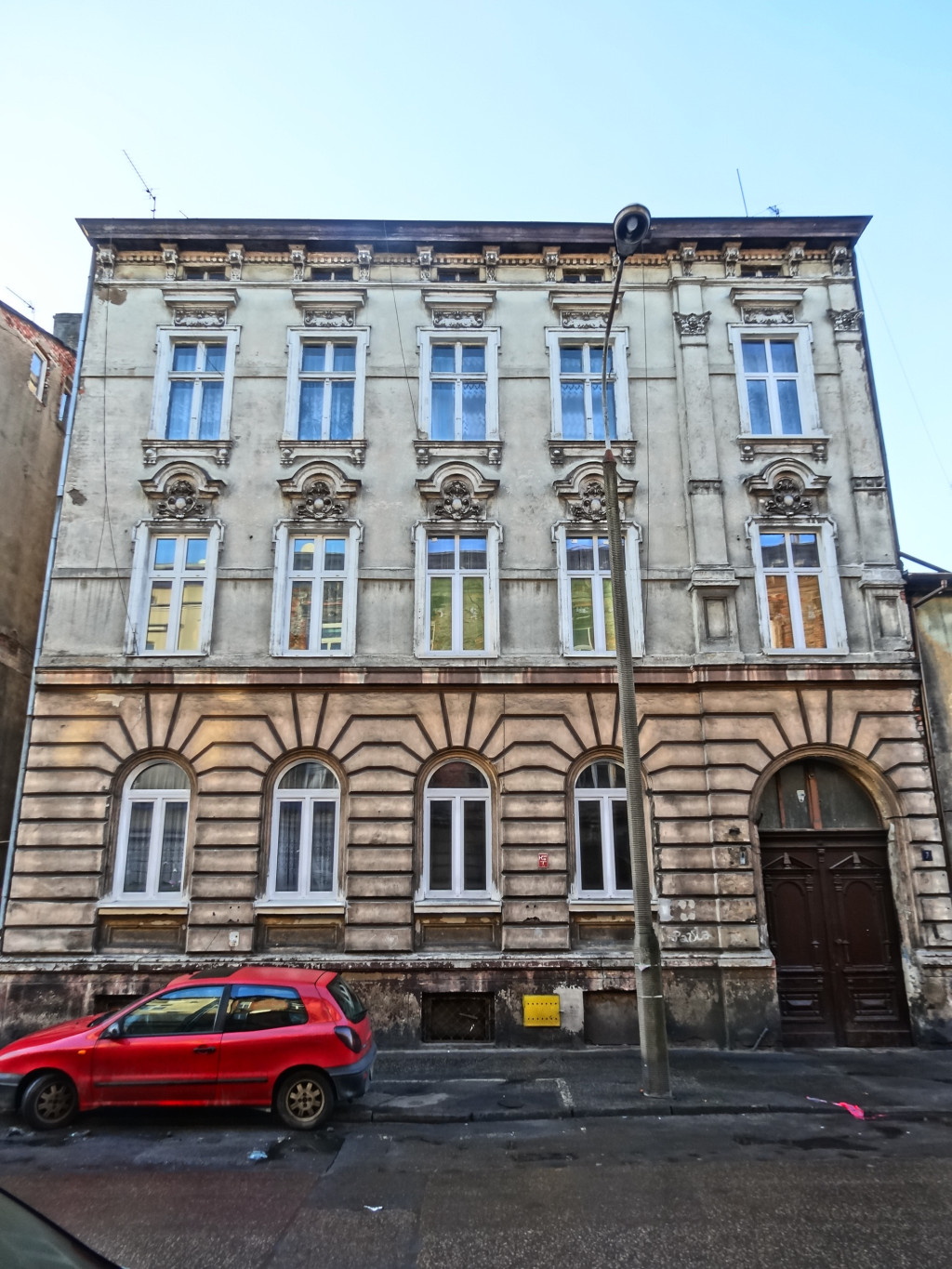
Main elevation

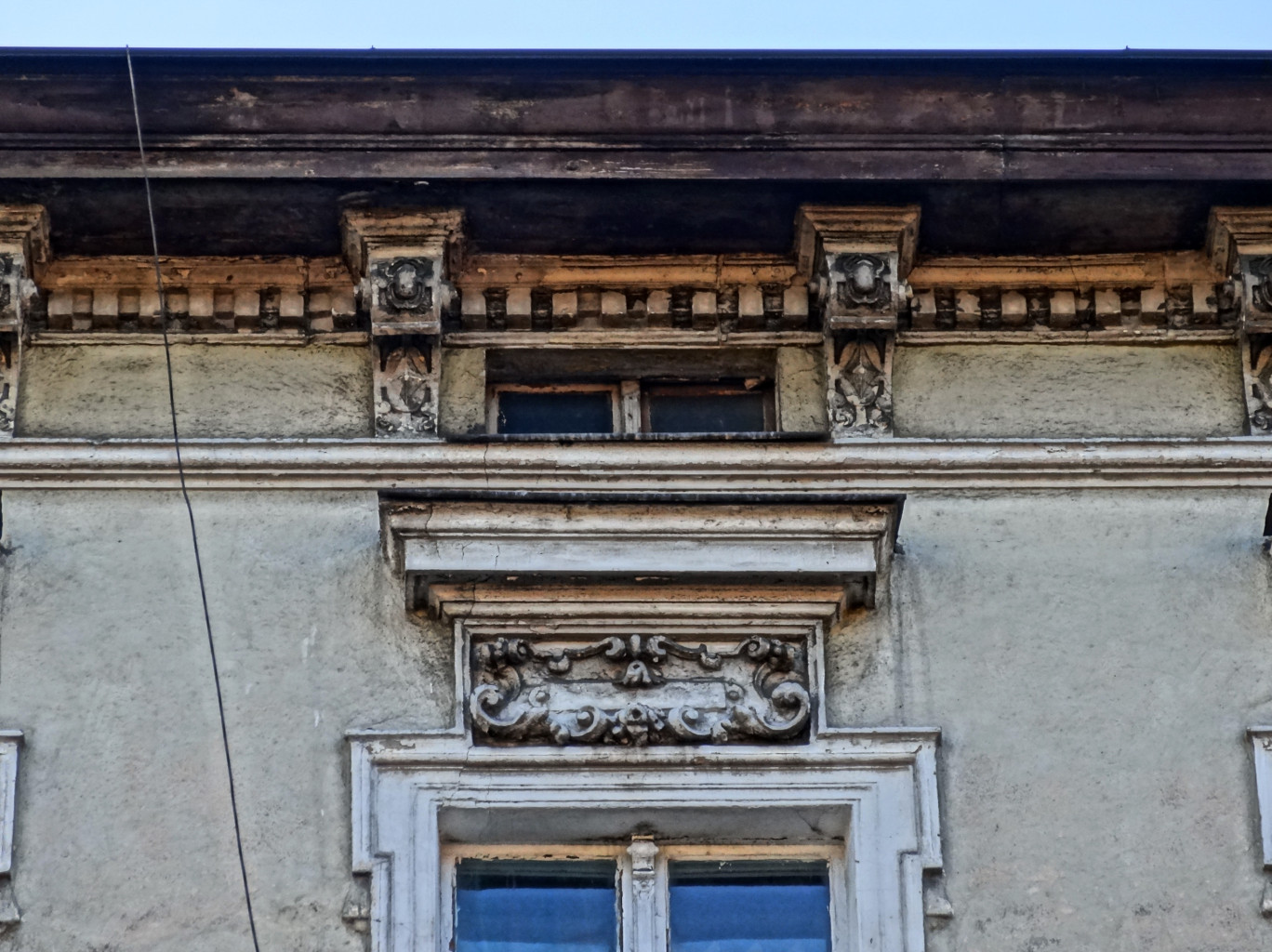
Corbel details

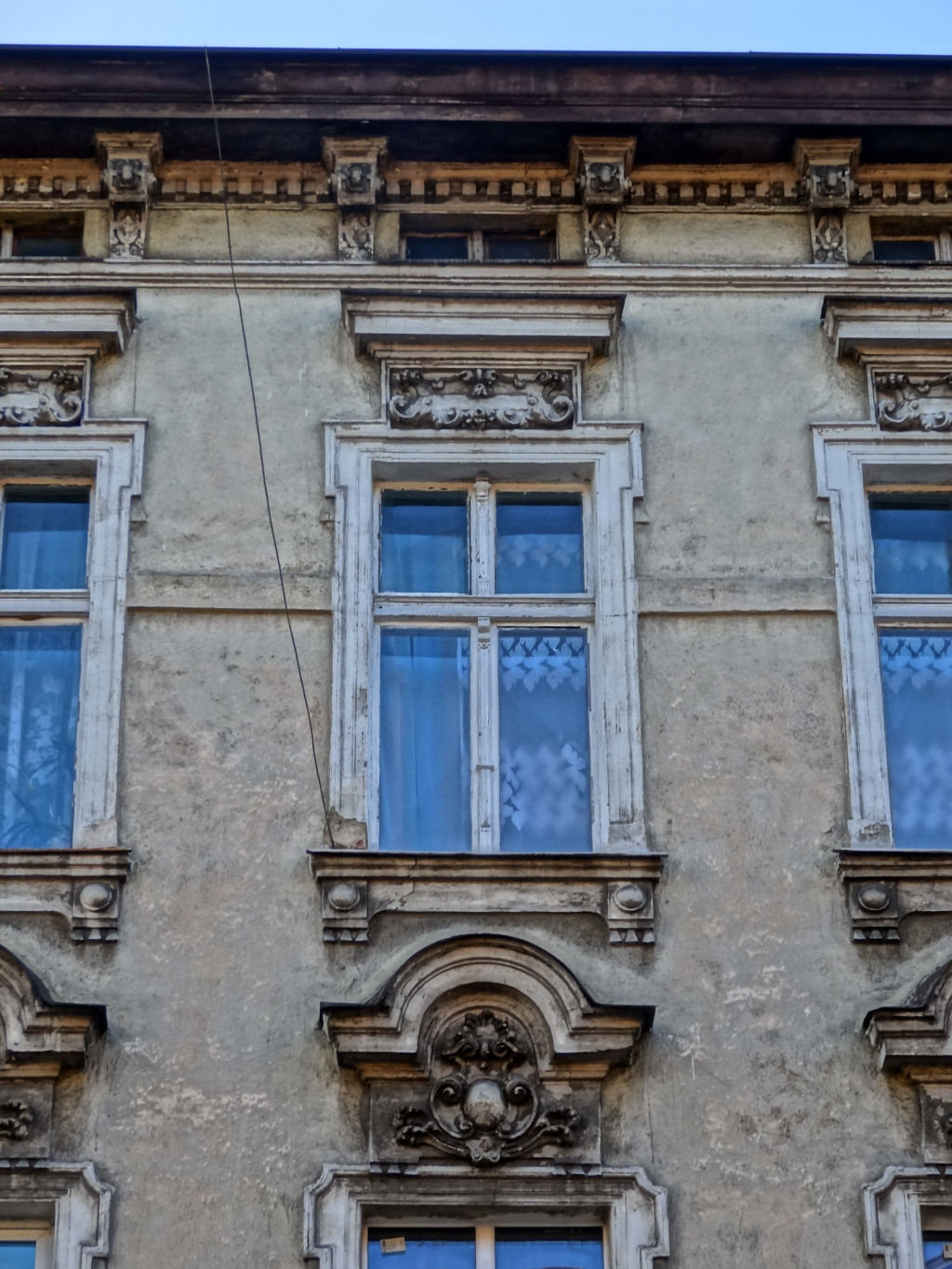
Garnished windows

Tenement at 8

Registered on Kuyavian-Pomeranian Voivodeship heritage list, Nr.A/1713 issued on January 1, 2017

1892-1893

Eclecticism

The first registered landlord was Theofila Sokolowski, widow of a locksmith, living at the abutting building she also possessed, at Nr.10 (then 22 Schleinitz Straße). Before inhabiting there, she lived with her late husband Franz at 75a Danziger Straße, today's 145 Gdańska Street.

Renovated in 2019, the symmetrical façade displays numerous details of stuccoed decoration: mascarons, cornices, consoles, window sills.

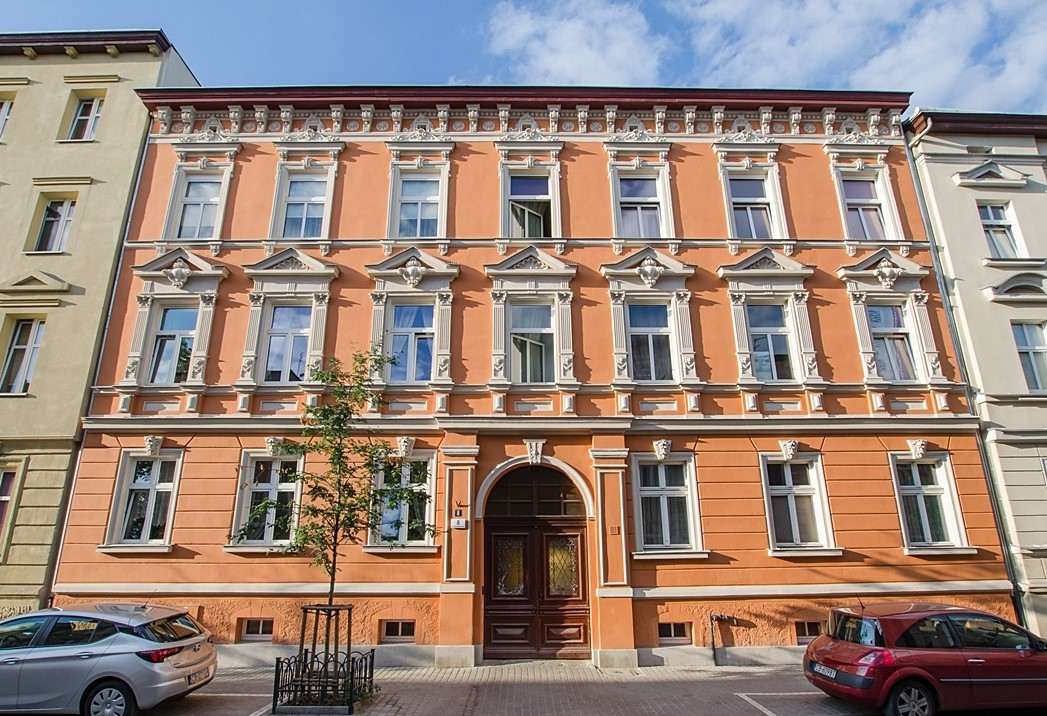
Main frontage

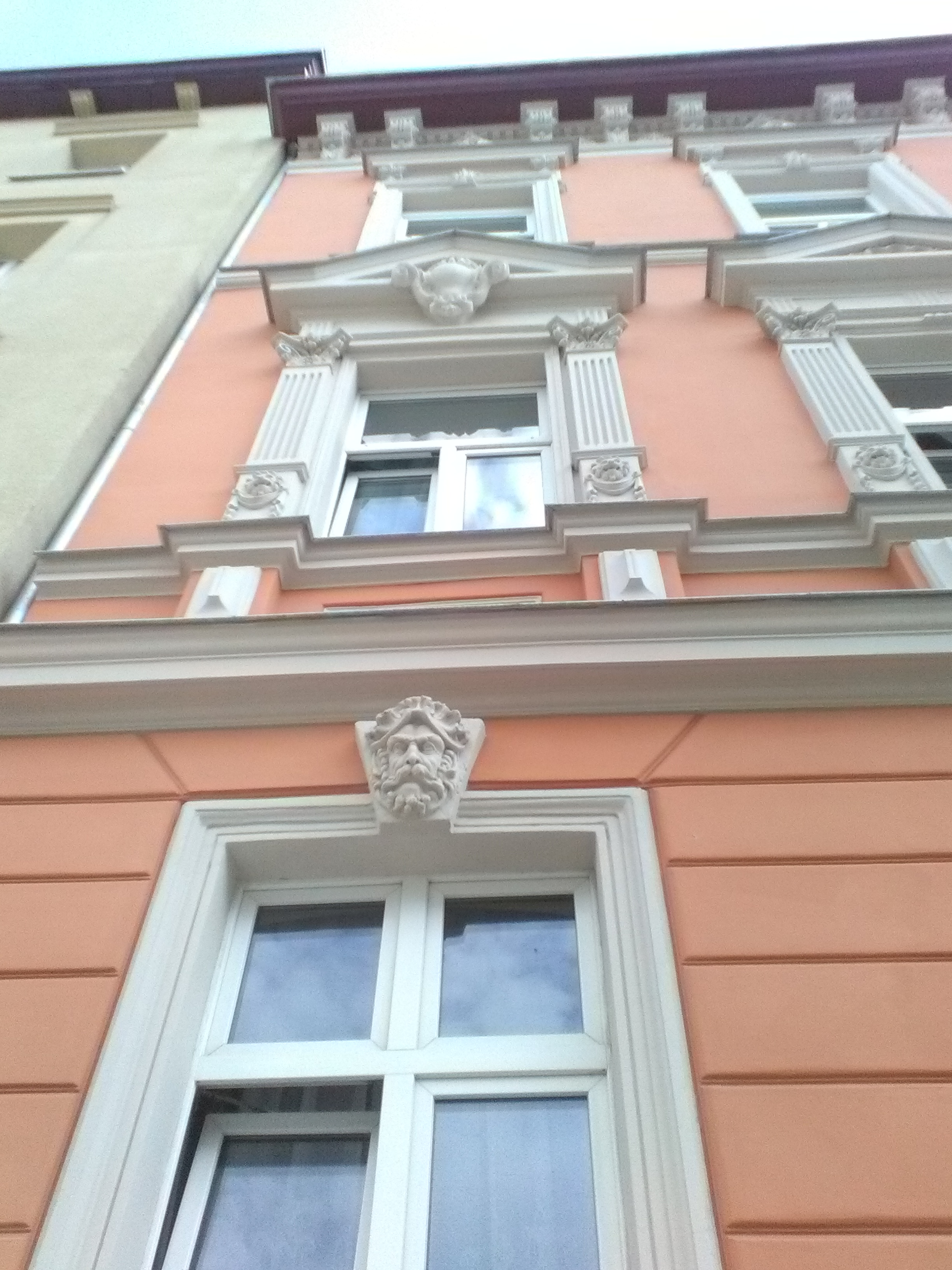
Bedecked windows

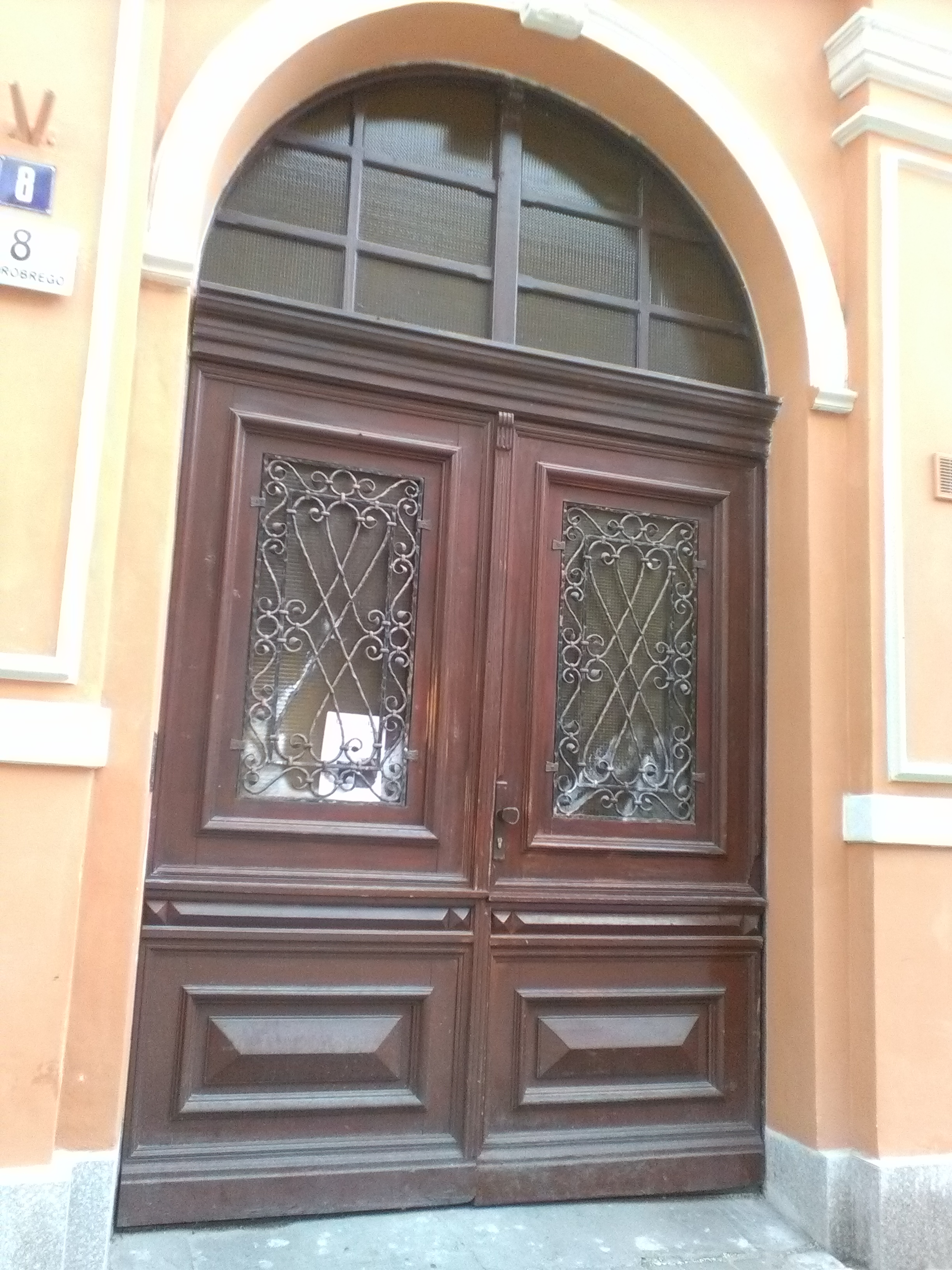
Entrance door

Sokolowski tenement at 10

1893-1894

Eclecticism

Franz Sokolowski, a locksmith, commissioned the edifice and transferred there from his previous address at 75a Danziger Straße, today's 145 Gdańska Street. Her widow Theofila survived him and kept ownership of this tenement and the one at Nr.10 till 1900.

The facade exhibits much less details than other refurbished buildings in the street.

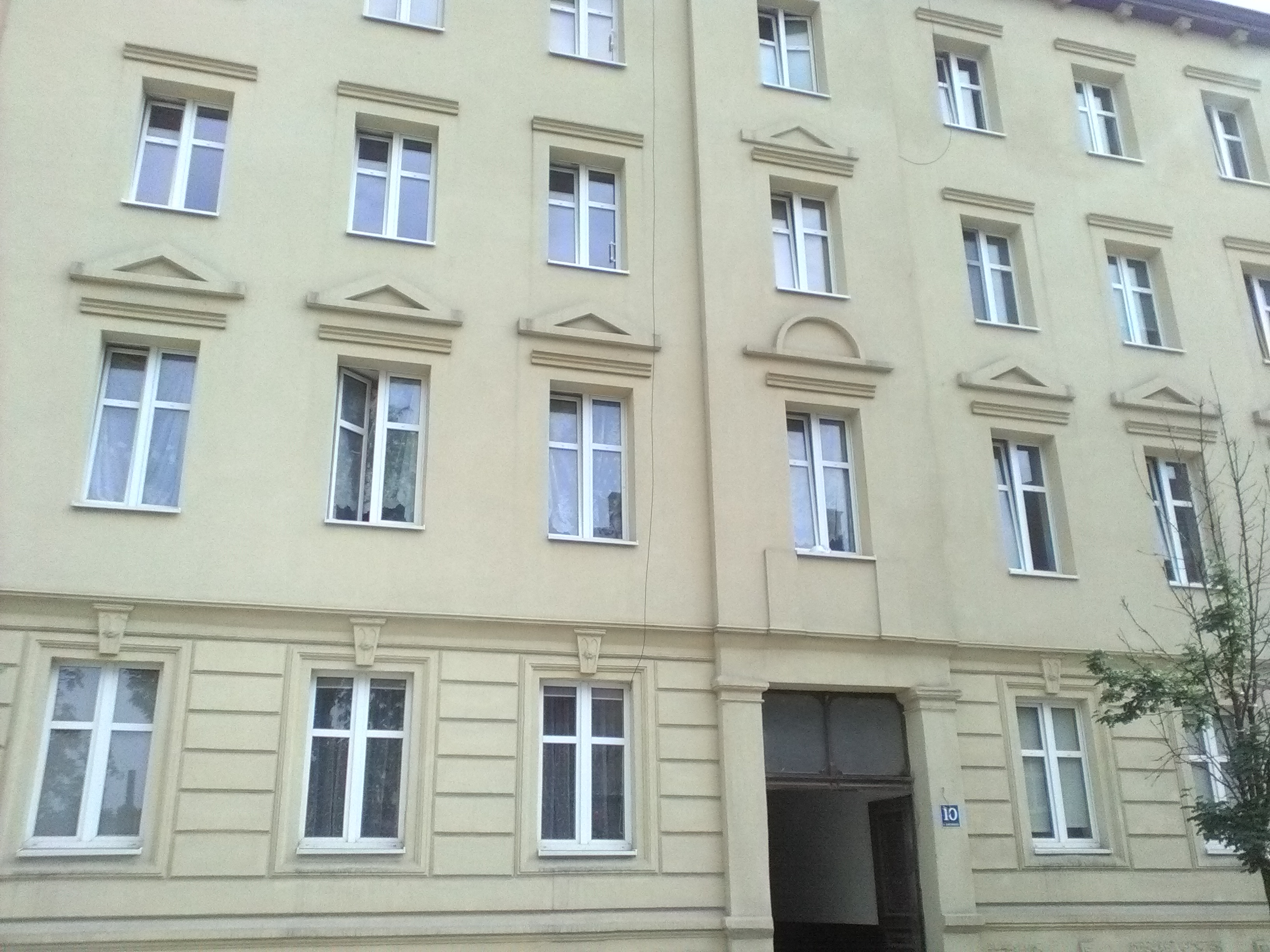
Facade on the street

Plot at 11, formerly MINERVA company

1922

Industrial architecture

In 1922, buildings were erected by the shoe manufacturing company MINERVA, established by Józef Tucholski and Bernard Sigurski. From the very beginning, the Minerva factory quickly achieved a considerable size and level of production considering its pre-war capabilities. Up to 400 pairs of shoes a day were produced here. In 1937, Józef Tucholski became the sole owner and started to expand the firm. However, in September 1939, the factory was taken over by the Germans, who transferred his family to Potulice concentration camp. After the war, the plant was nationalized and merged with other local factories ("LEO", "Junak", "Helios" or the Bucholz tannery) under the brand "KOBRA". The only memento of this glorious period is the large inscription on the side brick wall. After the Second World War, flats were arranged in the side building, once a number of alteration works had been realized to refurbish the ancient plant premises.

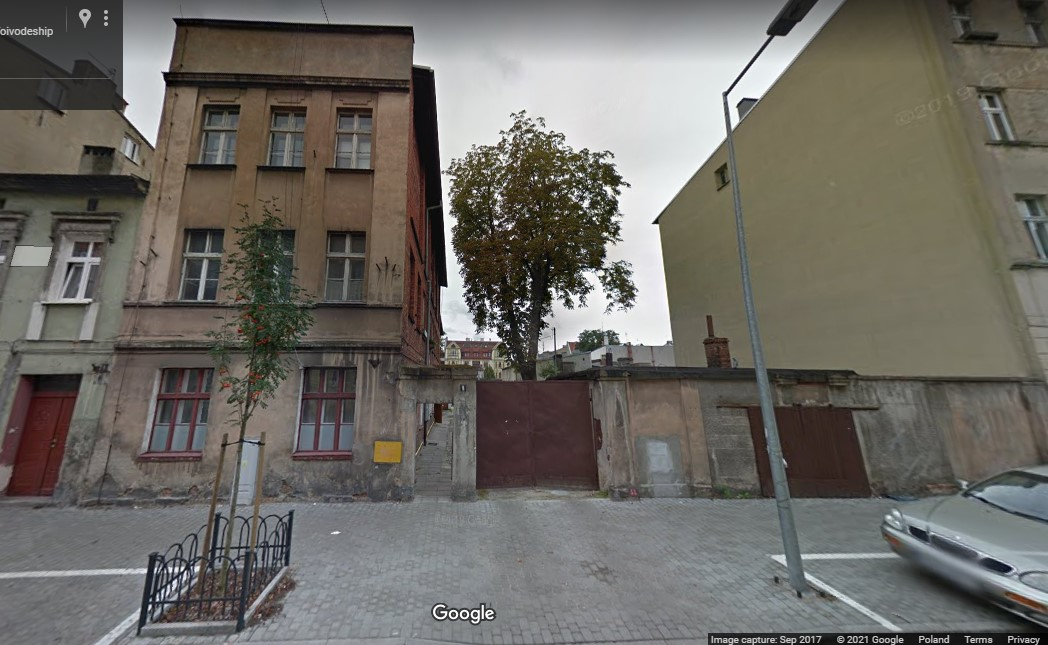
Facade on the street

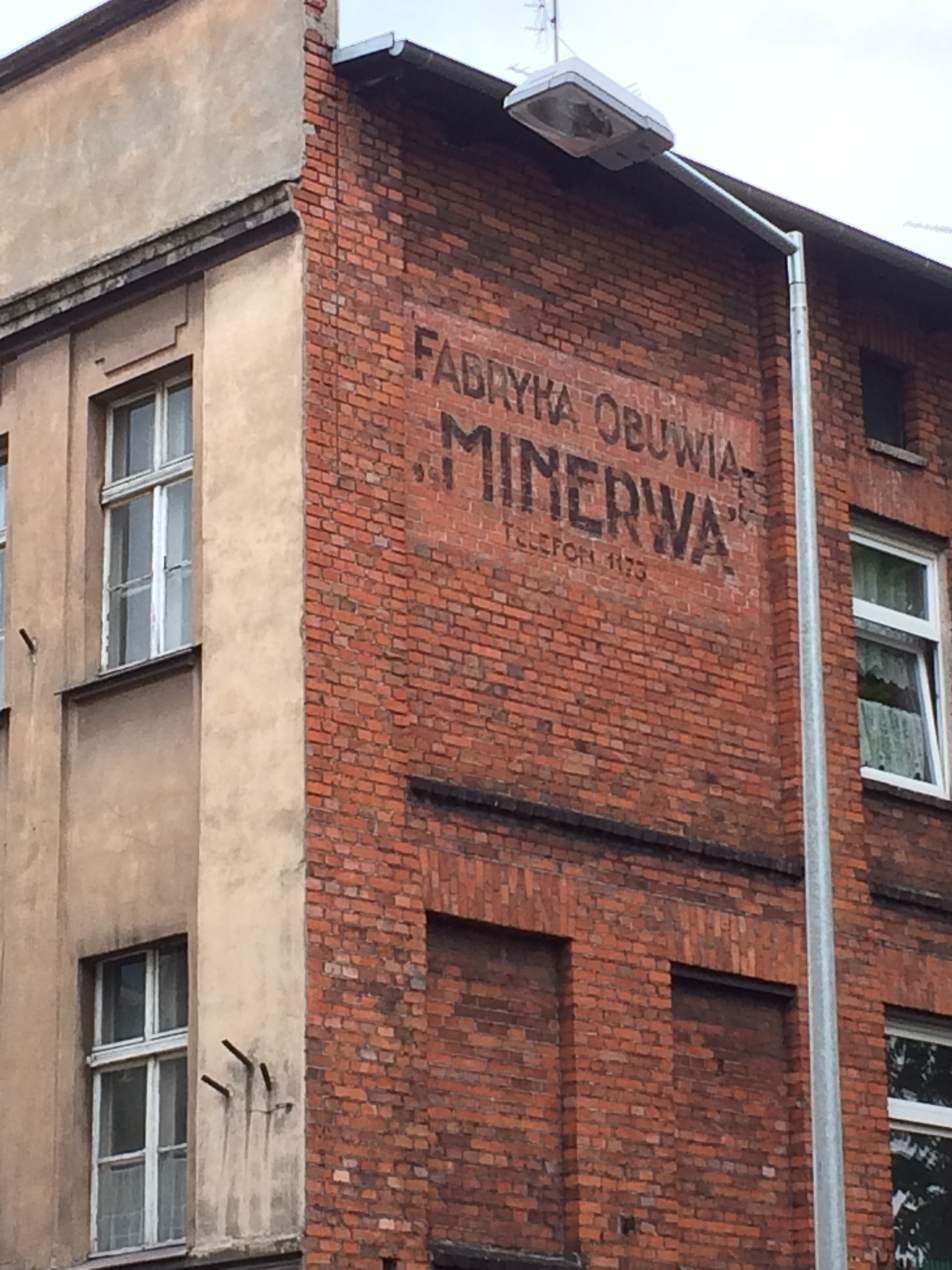
"MINERVA" writing

Tenement at 12

1893

Eclecticism

A rentier, Albin Cohnfeld, living at 32 Bahnoffstraße (today's 73 Dworcowa Street) was the landlord of this building.

Refurbished in the late 2010s, the edifice is especially noticeable with its two large balconies, fenced by a balustrade, protruding out of the facade.

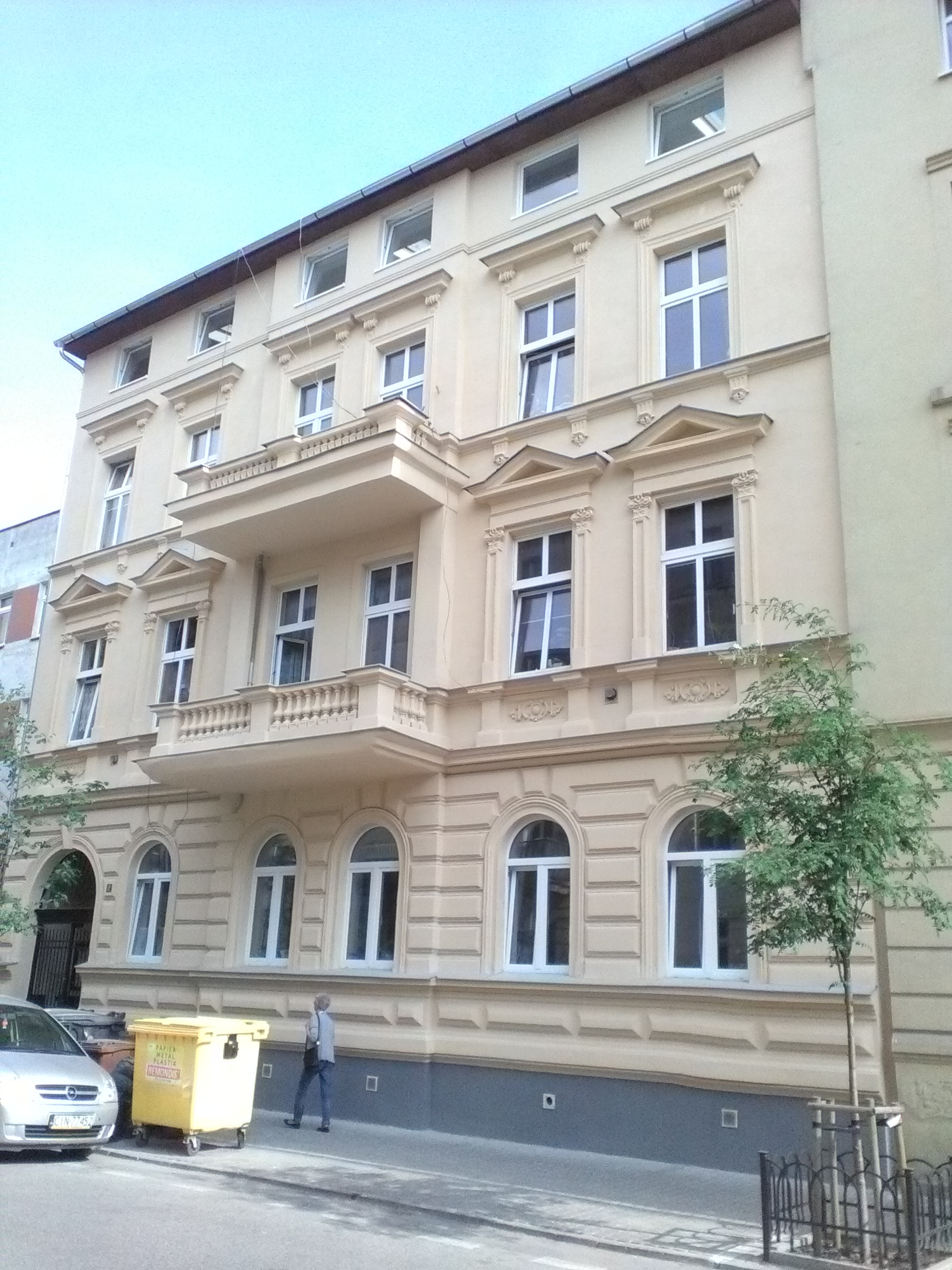
The elevation after renovation

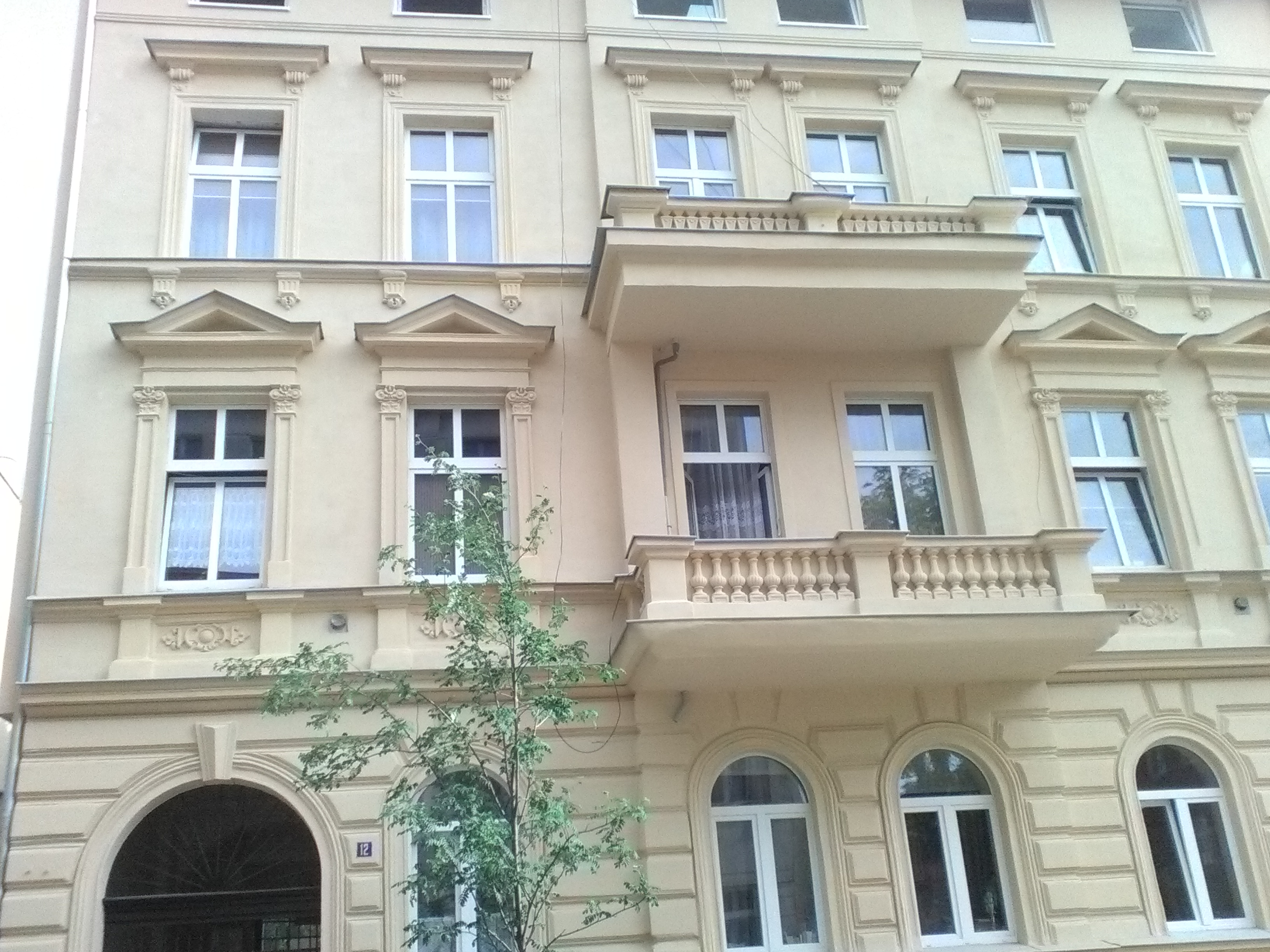
View of the balconies

Plot at 14

The building houses today a NFZ clinic, but the facility, via slight adjustments, witnessed many changes in its history.

In the late 1890s, the place at then 20 Schleinitzstrasse was an Officer's Casino for the military personnel in nearby barracks at Karl Straße (Warszawska street), Friedrich Wilhelm Straße (Zygmunta Augusta street) and Rinkauerstraße (Pomorska street).

After the re-creation of the Polish state, in mid-September 1919, the building was bought by "Orient", a cigarette manufacturer from Poznań which set up in the premises a factory directed by Tadeusz Karasiński. The plant employed 110 people and produced daily more than a million cigarettes. In 1921, the site was expanded: a factory hall was added in the yard along the property at Nr.16. The production ceased in June 1922 when a state tobacco monopoly was introduced by the Polish government.

Soon afterwards (mid-1920s), the factory was sold to the company "Zakład Przemysłowe ZAP", operating at nearby Kwiatowa street. After building works, the site was converted to a pasta production plant, which opened in January 1926. In 1928, "ZAP" sold the premises to Józef Häusler. He developed production, modernized the factory, inserted new, more efficient machines and improved the social conditions of employees. The plant was re-branded "Bydgoska Fabryka Makaronu i Środków Spożywczych, Józef Häusler". In the 1930s, it produced not only pasta, but also puddings, mincemeat, jellies, baking powders and oils and essences for dough. The site, which employed 37 people in 1937, had been manufacturing around one thousand tons of produces per year. During World War II, the factory was taken over by German management, expanded and renamed "Bromberger Teigwaren- und Nährmittelwerke" vorm. J. Häusler, Bromberg.

Józef Häusler was murdered by the Gestapo during Bydgoszcz occupation; his name is mentioned on a commemorative plaque in honor of the merchants who perished in 1939–1945, placed in Bydgoszcz Cathedral.

In January 1945, Soviet troops billeted in the factory premises. In the late 1940s, the plant was nationalized under the brand "Bydgoską Wytwórnią Makaronu" ("Bydgoszcz Pasta Manufacturing Company"). It remained operational till the 1960s. The last director was Mr. Wielgus, who lived in the factory building, on the ground floor with his family.

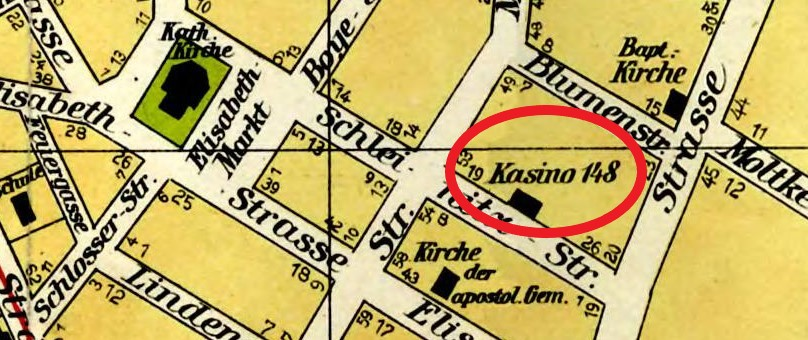
Officer's casino on a 1914 map

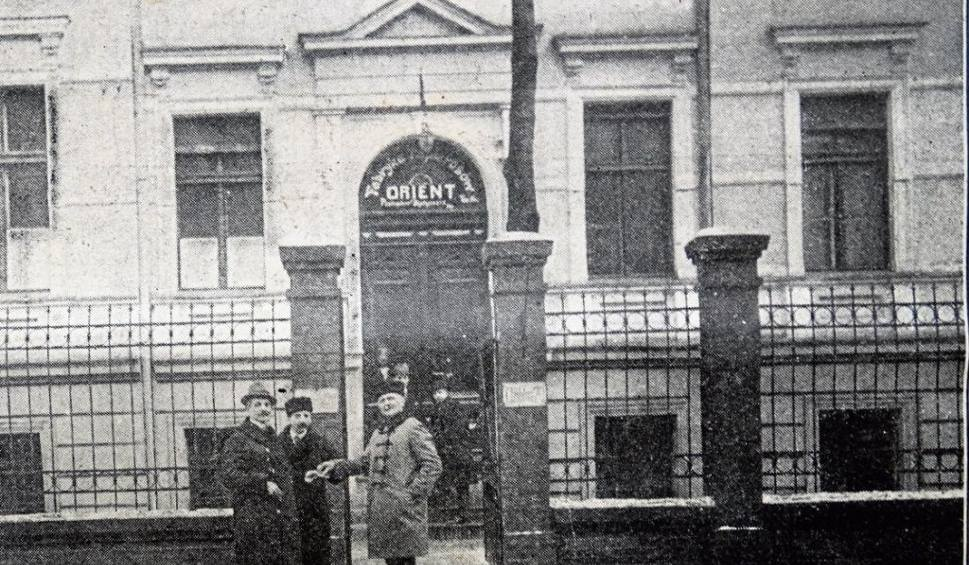
Tobacco Products Factory ca 1920

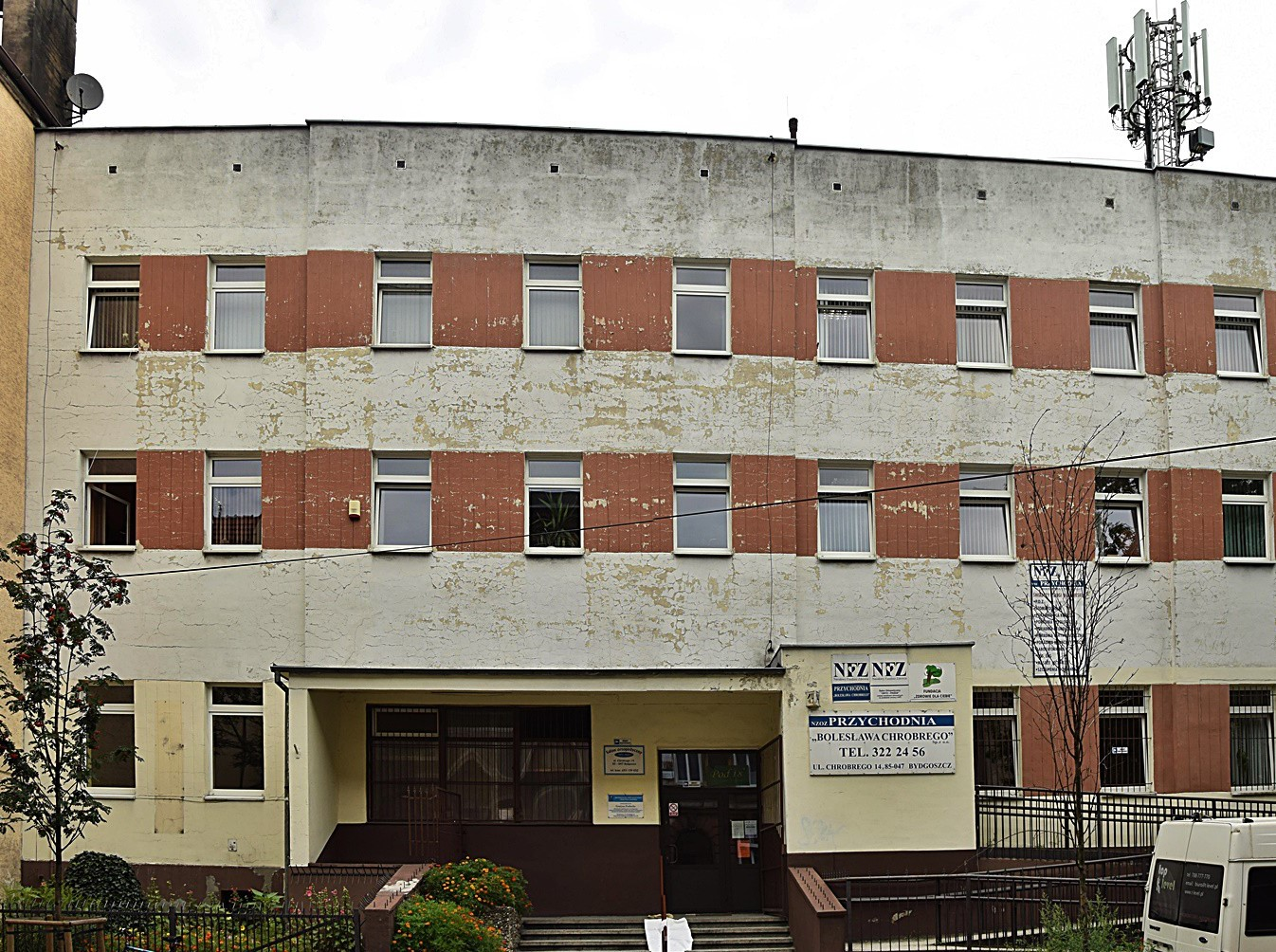
Current NFZ building

Tenement at 15

1895

Eclecticism

First registered owner at then 7 Schleinitz Straße was Wilhelm Voigt. A year later, the edifice moved into the hands of Theodor Walter, a hotelier who ran a hotel (Walter's hotel) at 4 KornMarkt (today's Zbożowy Rynek). He had the third floor extended with a residential wing, on a design by Bromberg famous architect Józef Święcicki. After WWII, the building housed a factory of mineral water: writings are still legible near the side door on the right of the edifice, Pierwsza Polska, Fabryka Wód Mineralnich.

The deteriorated facade still exhibits some mascarons, windows embellished with pediments and festoons, adorned lintels, corbel with vegetal motifs, corinthian columns and two loggias.

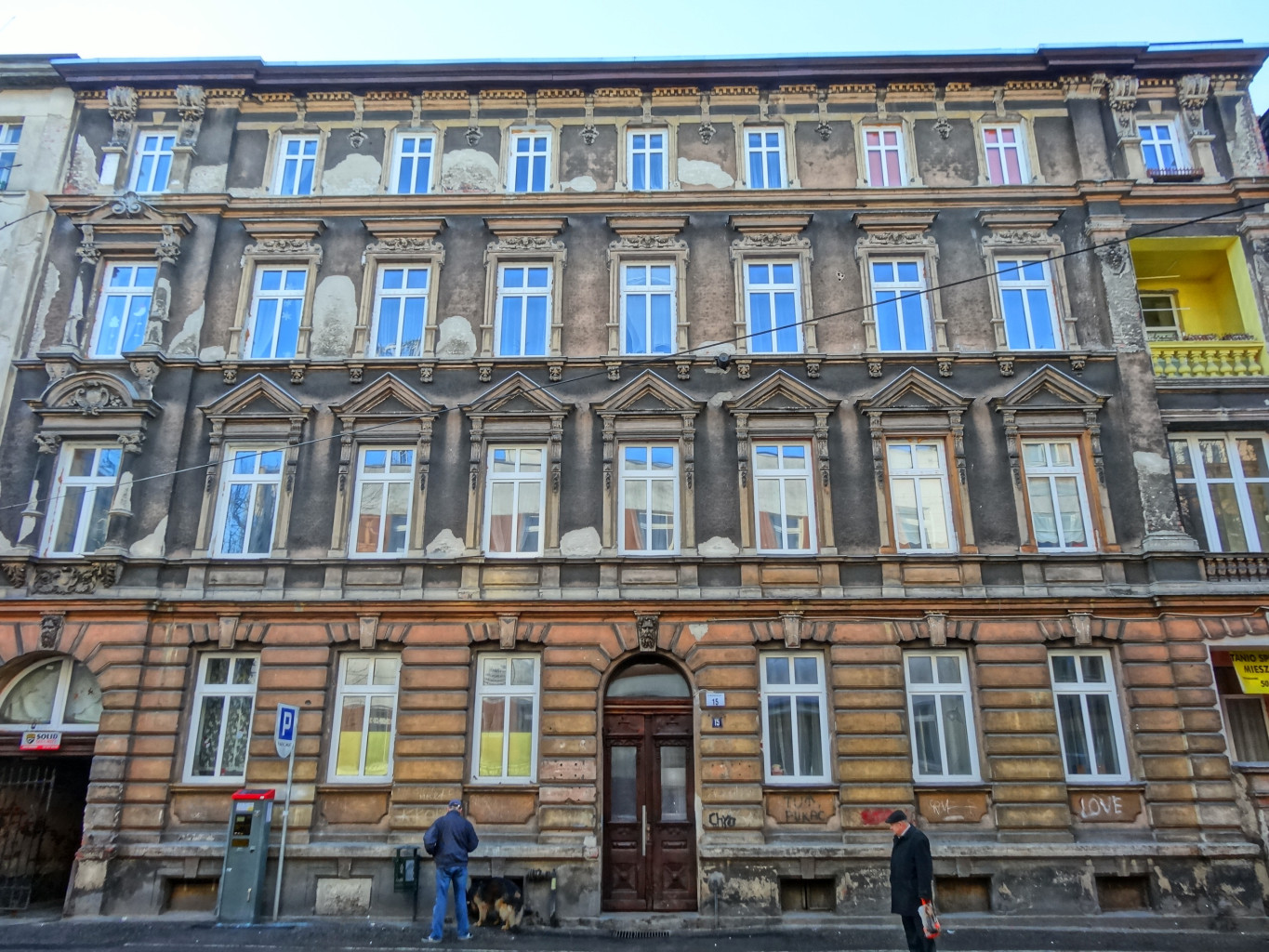
Main elevation

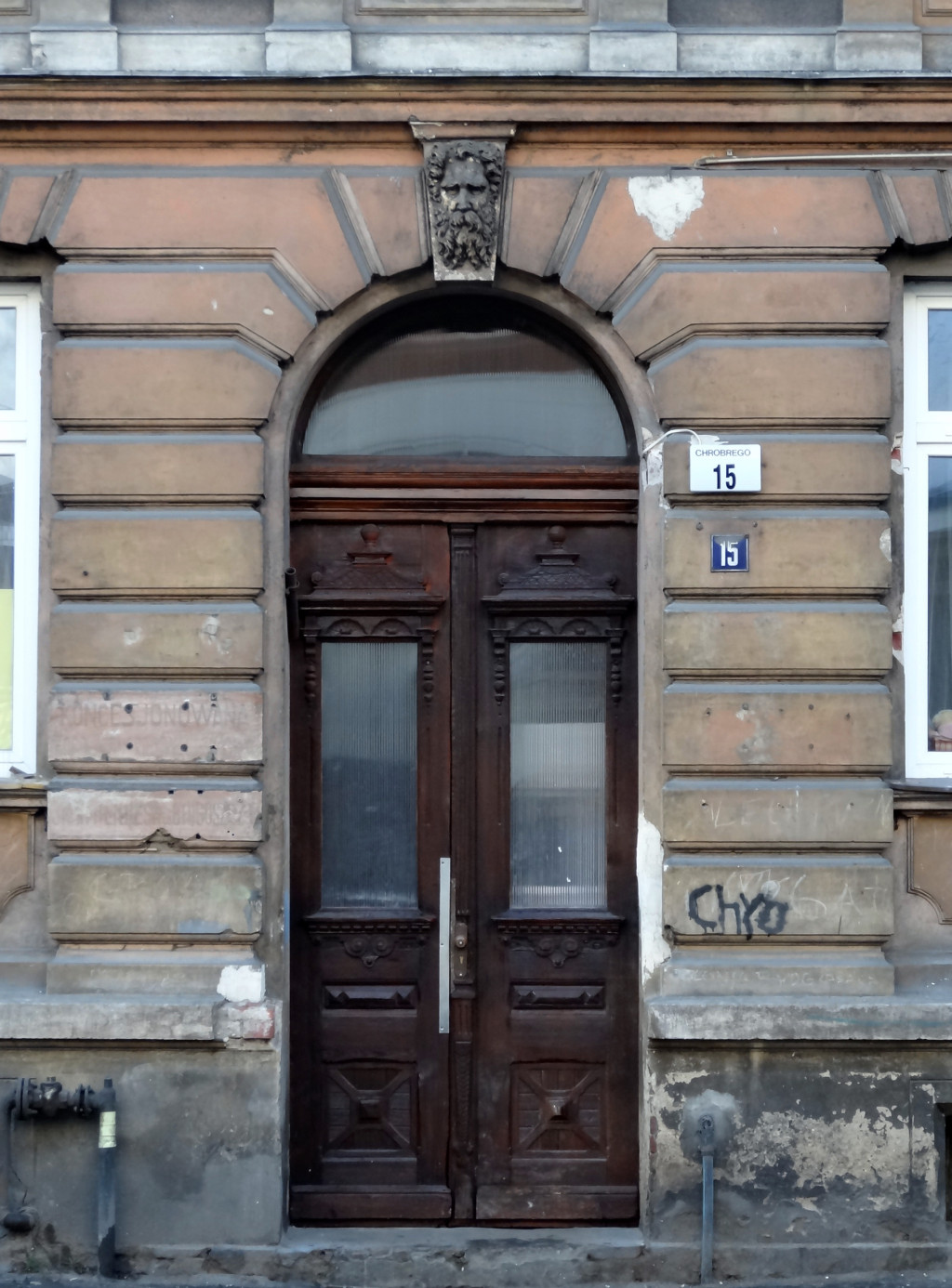
Entrance door

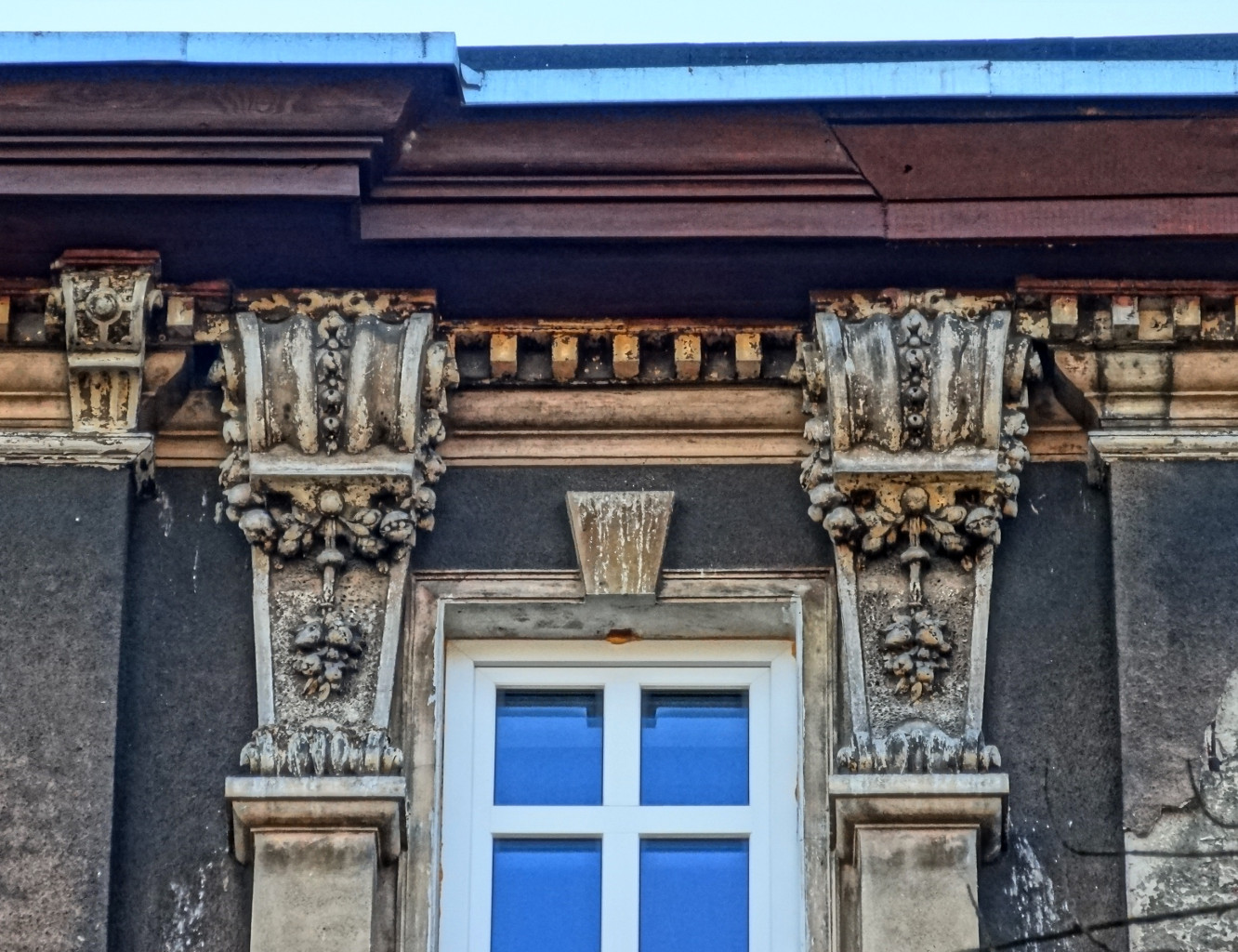
Detail of the corbels

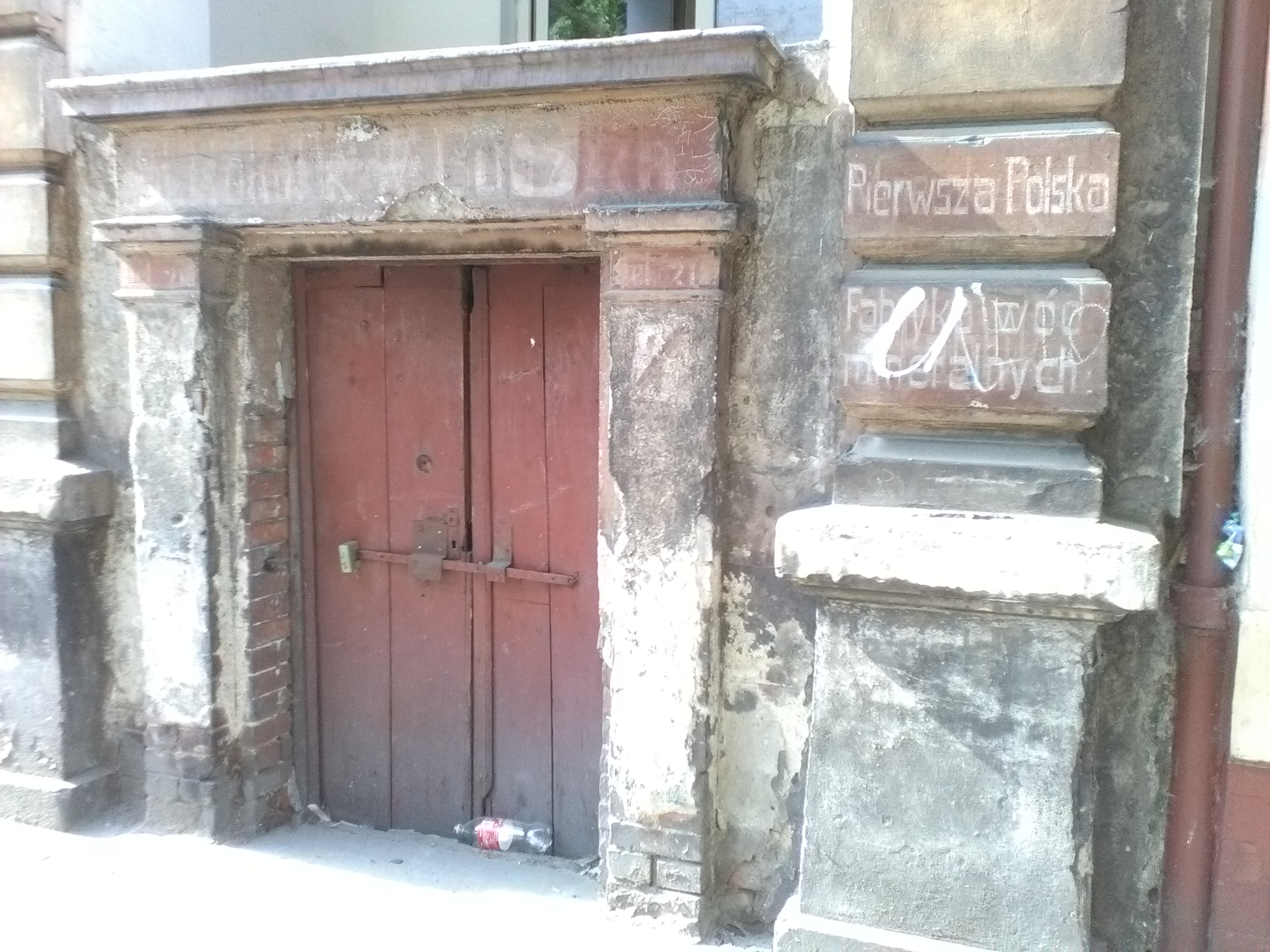
Writings for the mineral water factory

Gustaw Röske tenement at 16

1912

Early Modern Architecture

Gustaw Röske was a master baker who had owned the plot since the early 1890s. He did not live there, but at 88 Bahnhoff Straße (today's 18 Dworcowa Street), till WWI.

The early modernist elevation does not carry any architectural details, bare the presence of lean vertical lines and a large bay window.

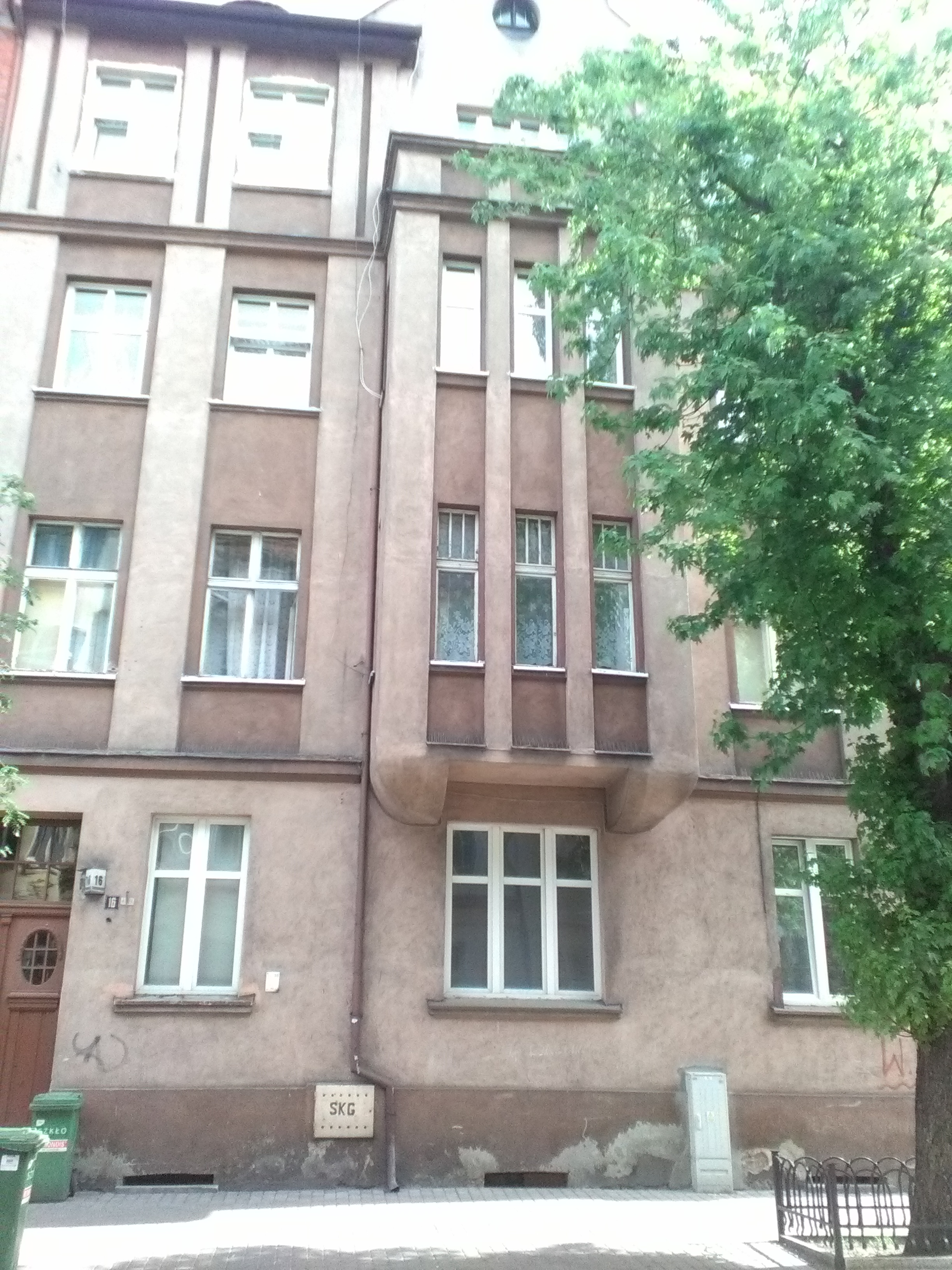
Main elevation

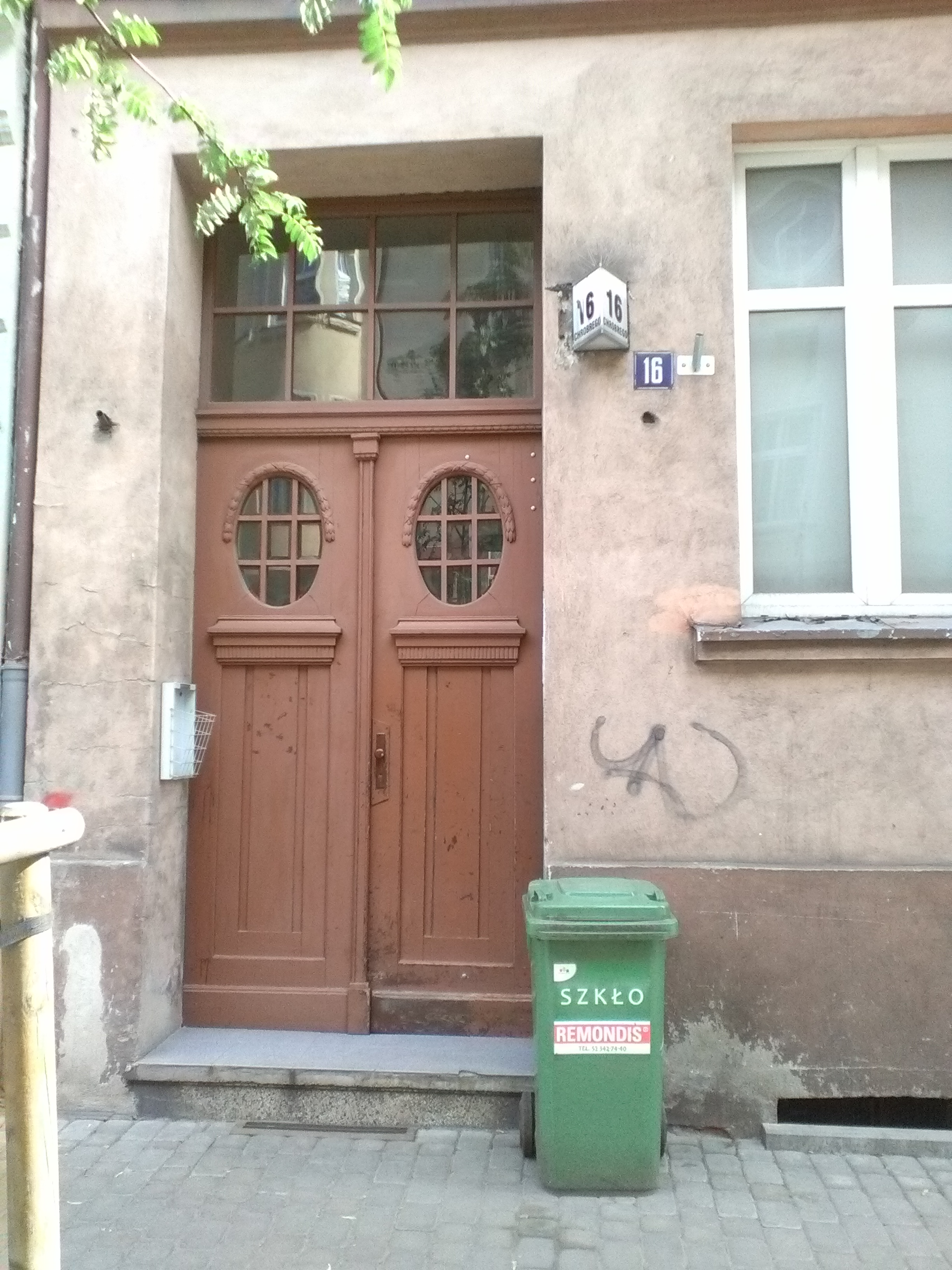
Entrance door

Tenement at 17

1910

Late Art Nouveau

Although the parcel was built since the 1890s, the current building has been commissioned by Hermann Baruch, selling metal scraps and discards.

The balanced facade exposes two bay windows topped by gambrel roof gables. At the top, two dormer windows overlook the large entrance door.

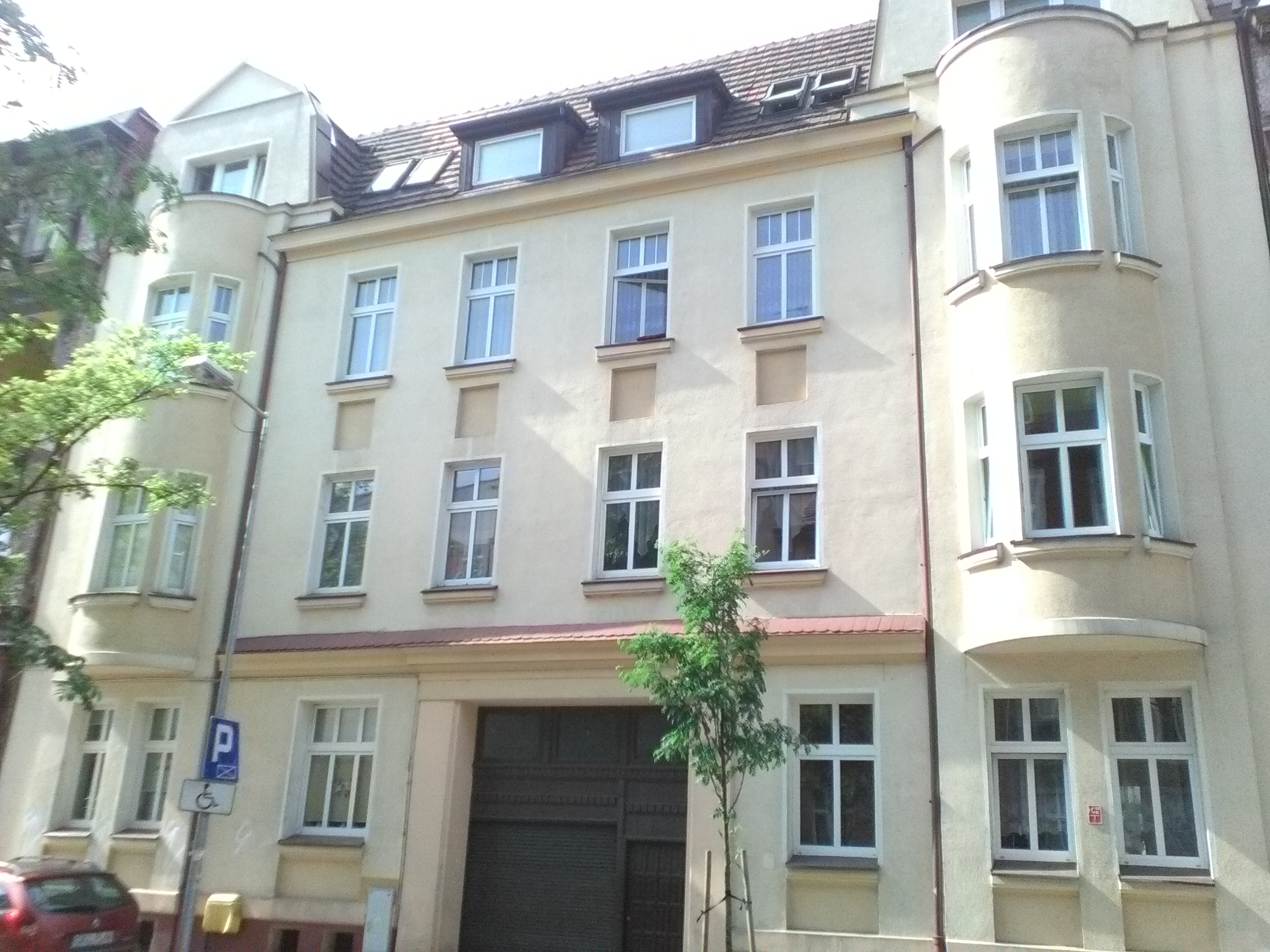
Facade on the street

August Jordan tenement at 18, corner with 24 Sienkiewicza Street

Registered on Kuyavian-Pomeranian Voivodeship heritage list, Nr.787208, A/1626 issued on February 6, 2013

1891-1892

Eclecticism

The commissioner was August Jordan, a raft builder. He lived there till the start of the 20th century.

The building, renovated in 2019, is remarkable by its mix of plain brick and bossage elements. Furthermore, all the windows on the first floor have pediments while the last storey displays floral decoration in cartouches.

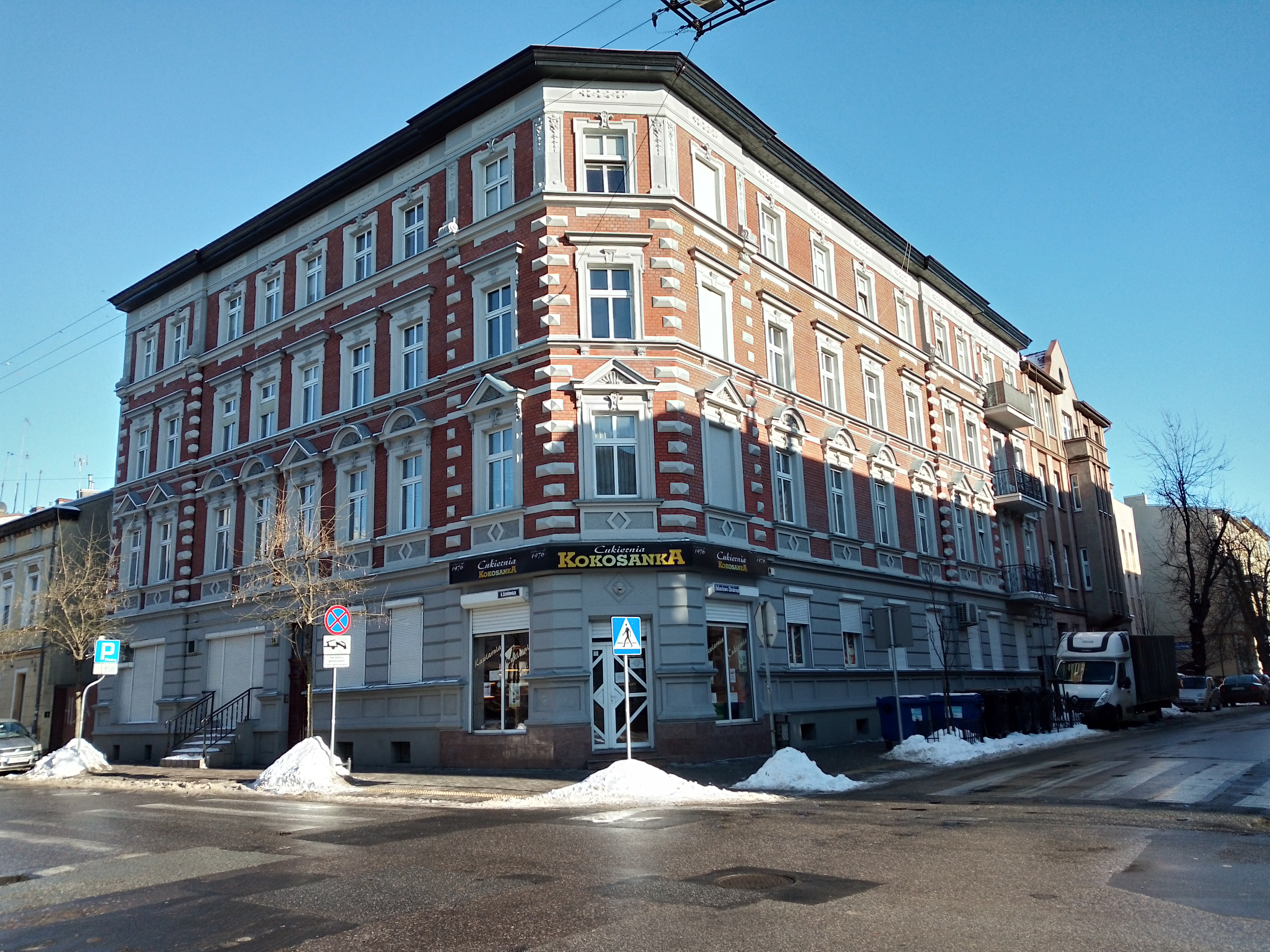
Corner view

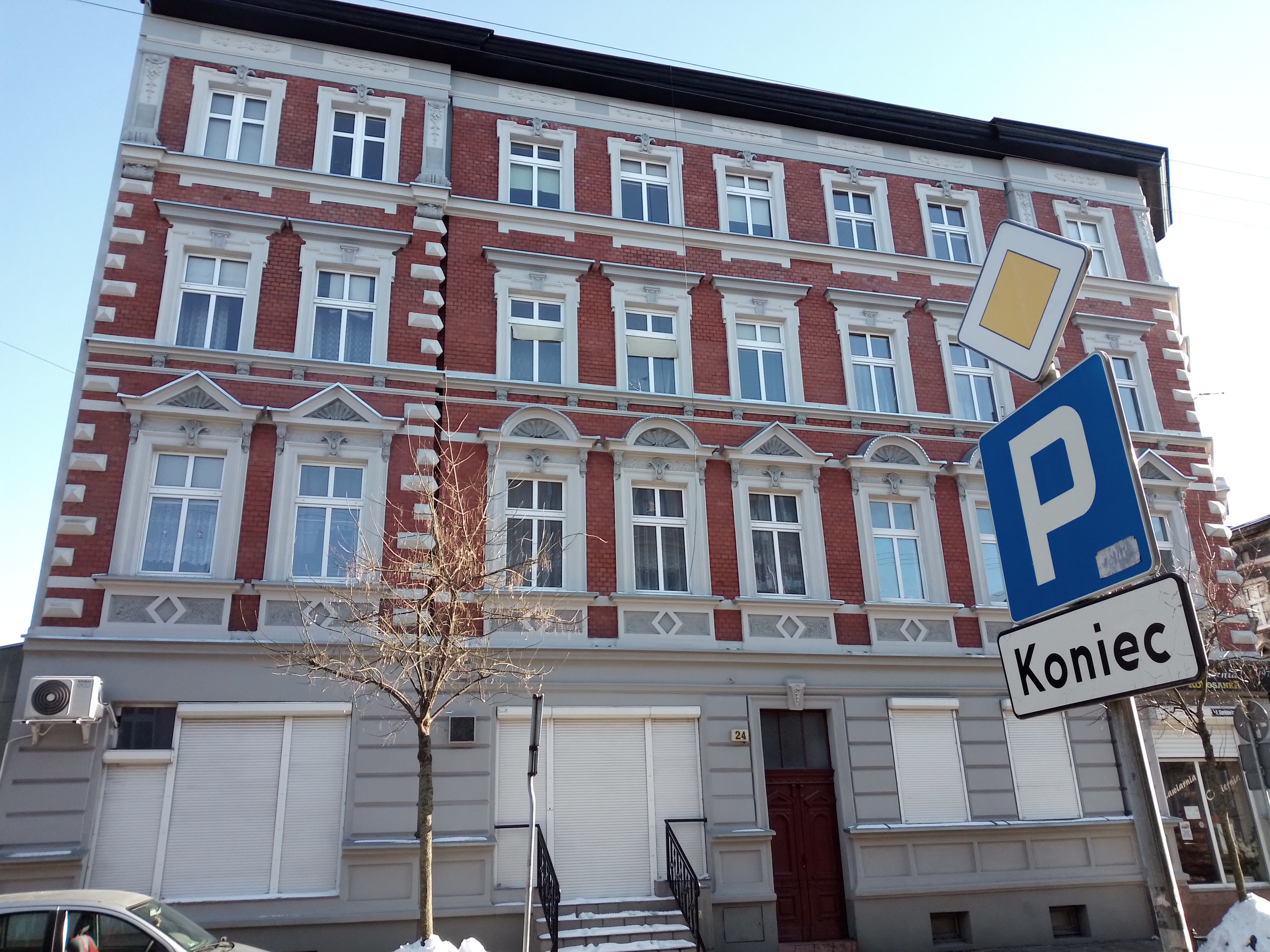
Elevation on Sienkiewicza street

Tenement at 23 Sienkiewicza Street, corner with Chrobrego street

1890s, by H. Brennecke

Neo-Renaissance

Teophil Tucholski, a locomotive driver, was the landlord at the construction of the building.

Nicely decorated cartouches are noticeable on the first floor of both facades.

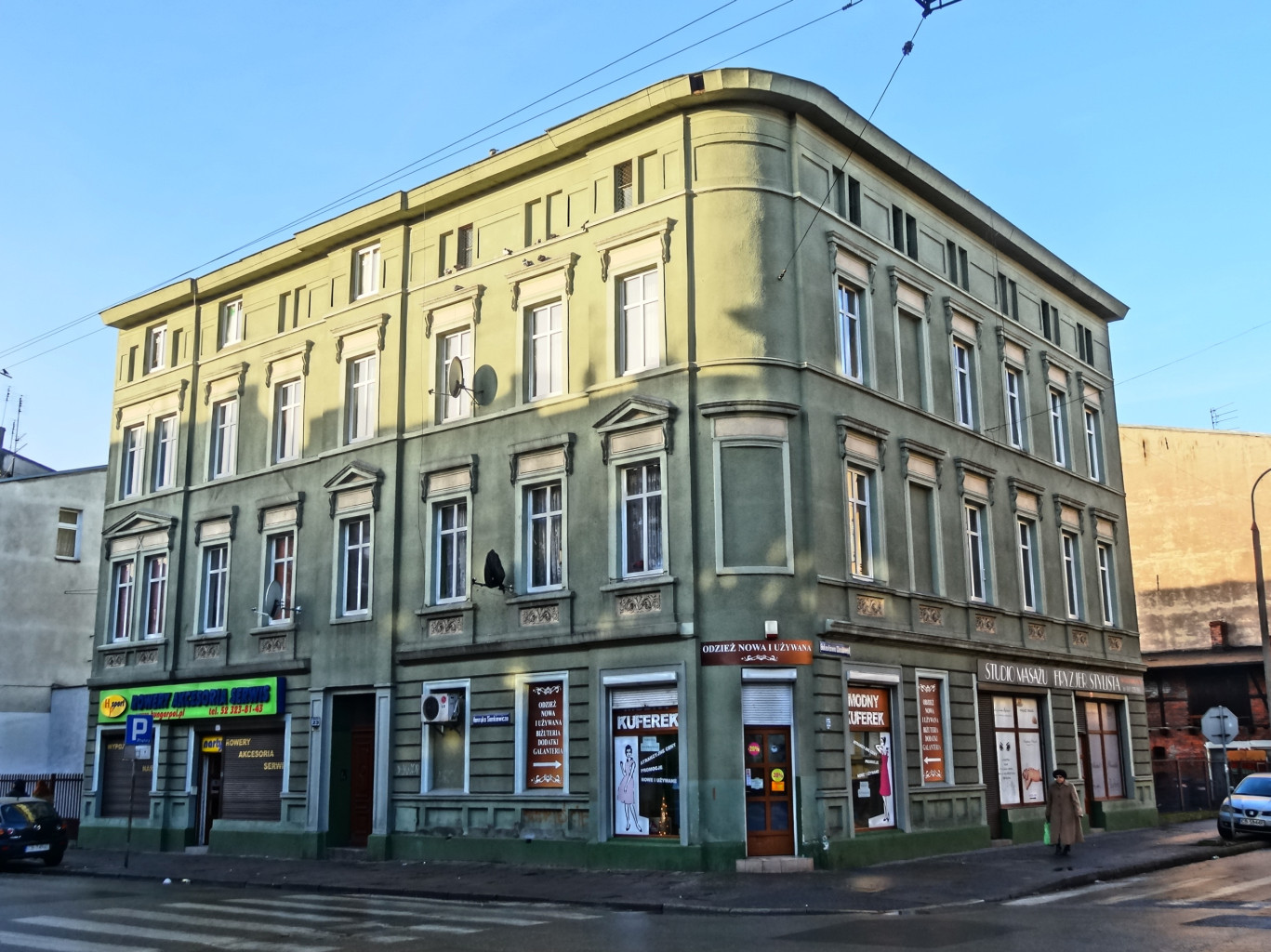
Corner view

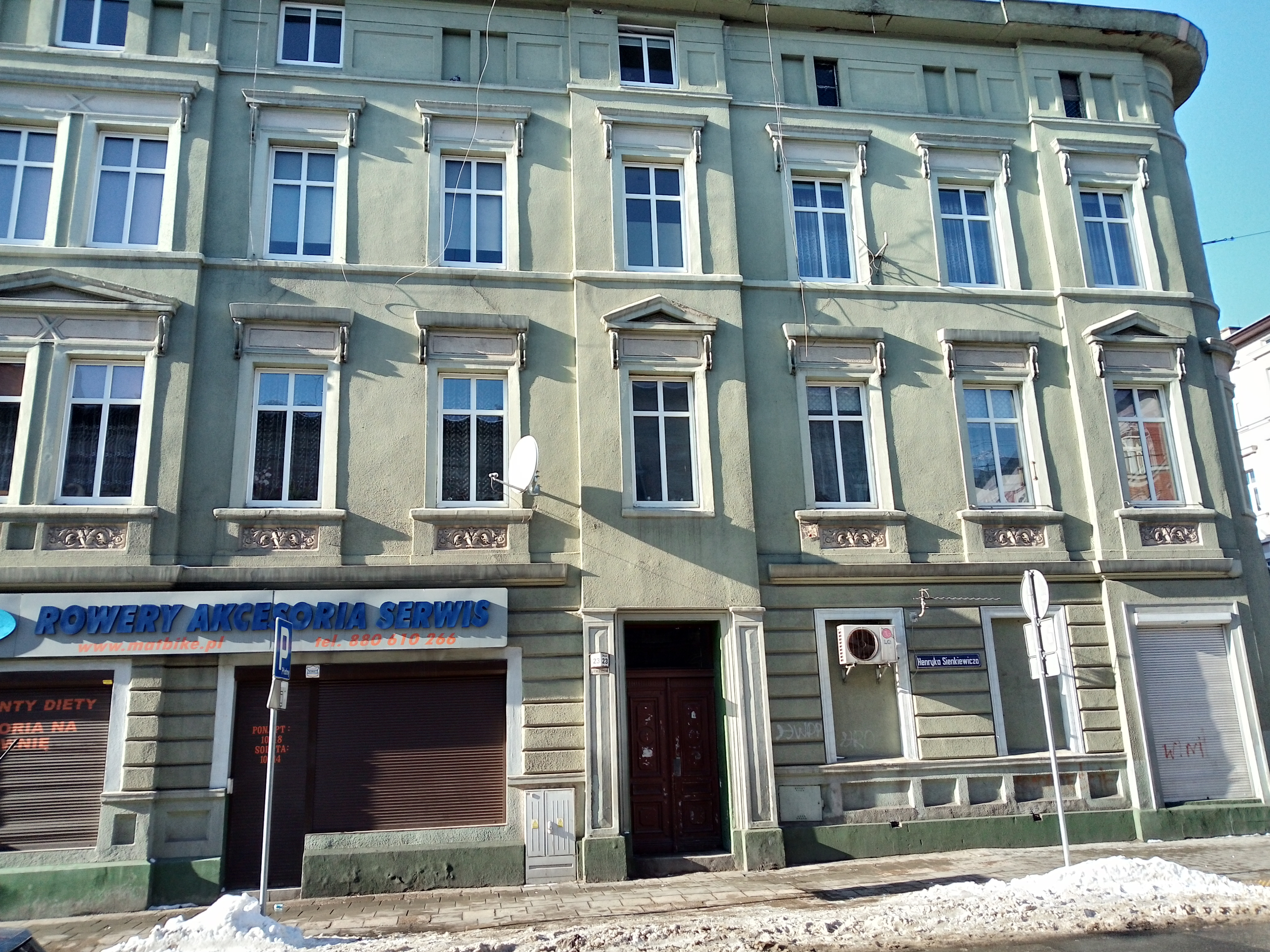
Detail of the elevation on Sienkiewicza street

Tenement at 19

1895-1896

Eclecticism

August Warnicke, living at 54 Bahnhoff Straße (today at the crossing of Dworcowa Street and Śniadeckich Street), ran this renting tenement till 1915. At the end of the First World War, his widow Alwine moved there before transferring to Świętojańska street in the 1920s.

The renovation carried out by the city showcases a multitude of stuccoed details and decoration, from the portal, to the bedecked pedimented windows.

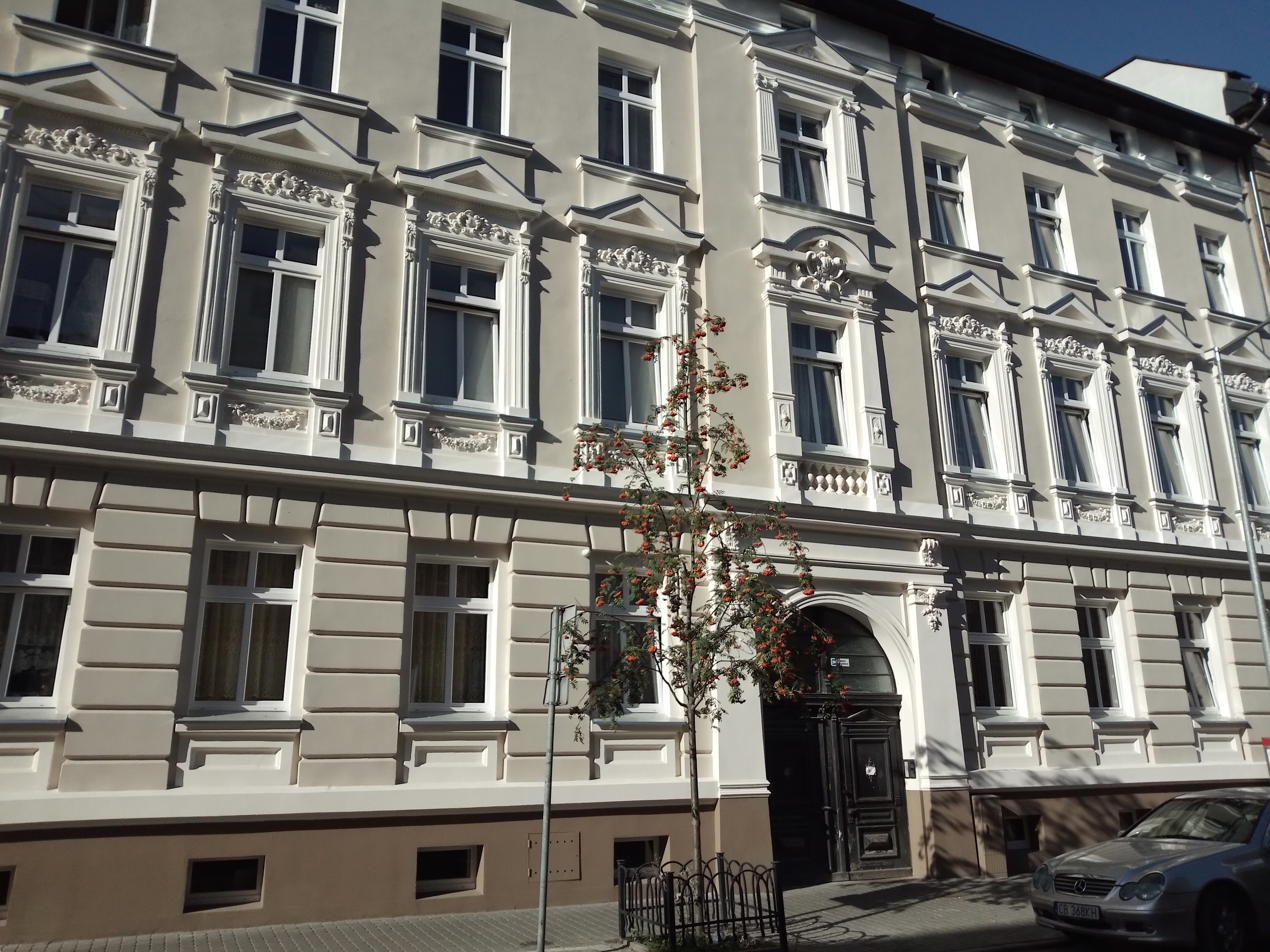
Renovated facade

Tenement at 20 Chrobrego street, corner with Sienkiewicza street

1895-1896

Eclecticism

Carl Juncker, a rentier, was listed as the first landlord of this corner building.

Nicely revamped in 2020, features now include a corner pediment with an adorned tympanum, various other pediments, balustrades, festoons and two superb balconies on Sienkiewicza street.

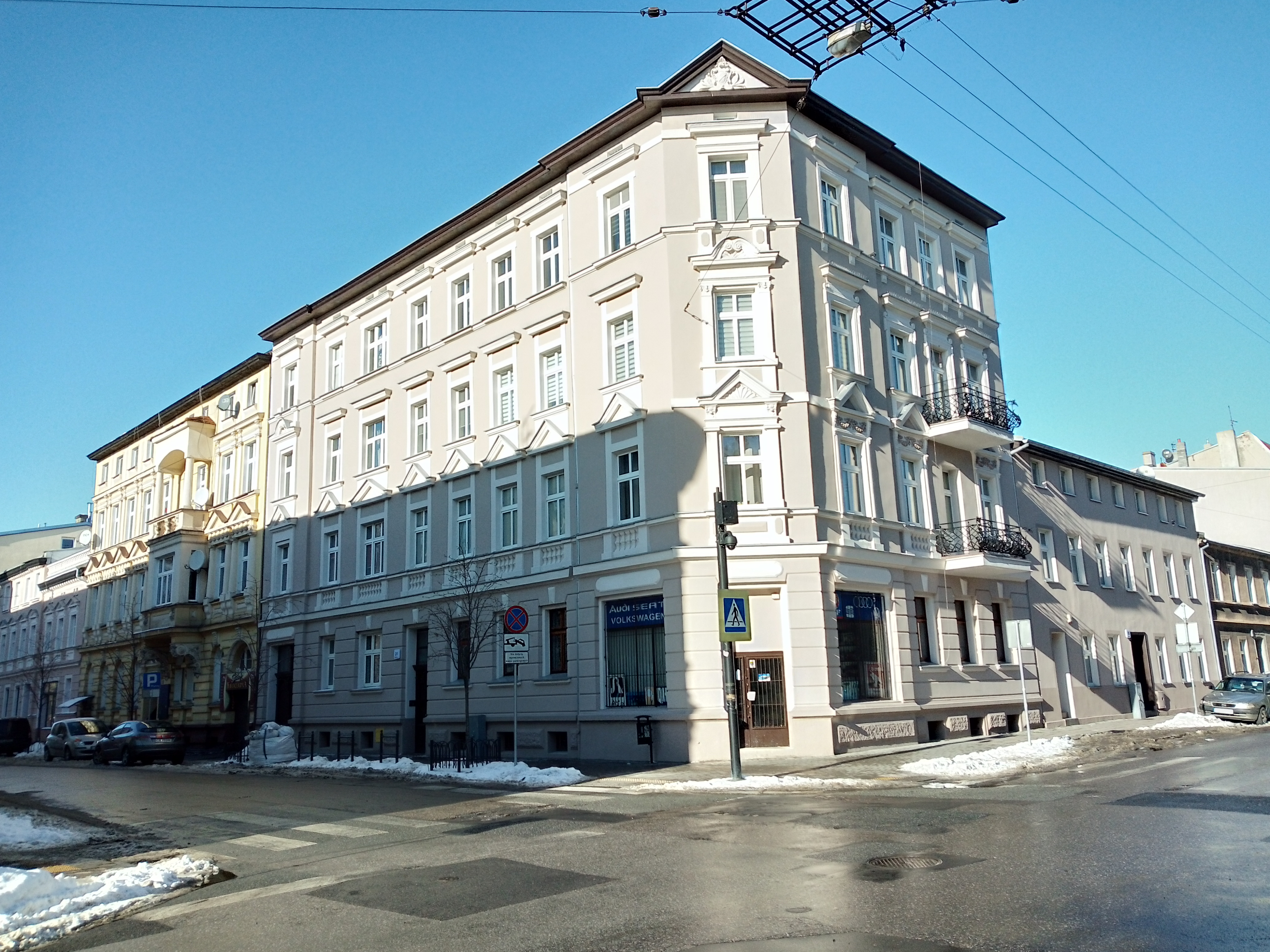
Elevation on both streets after refurbishing

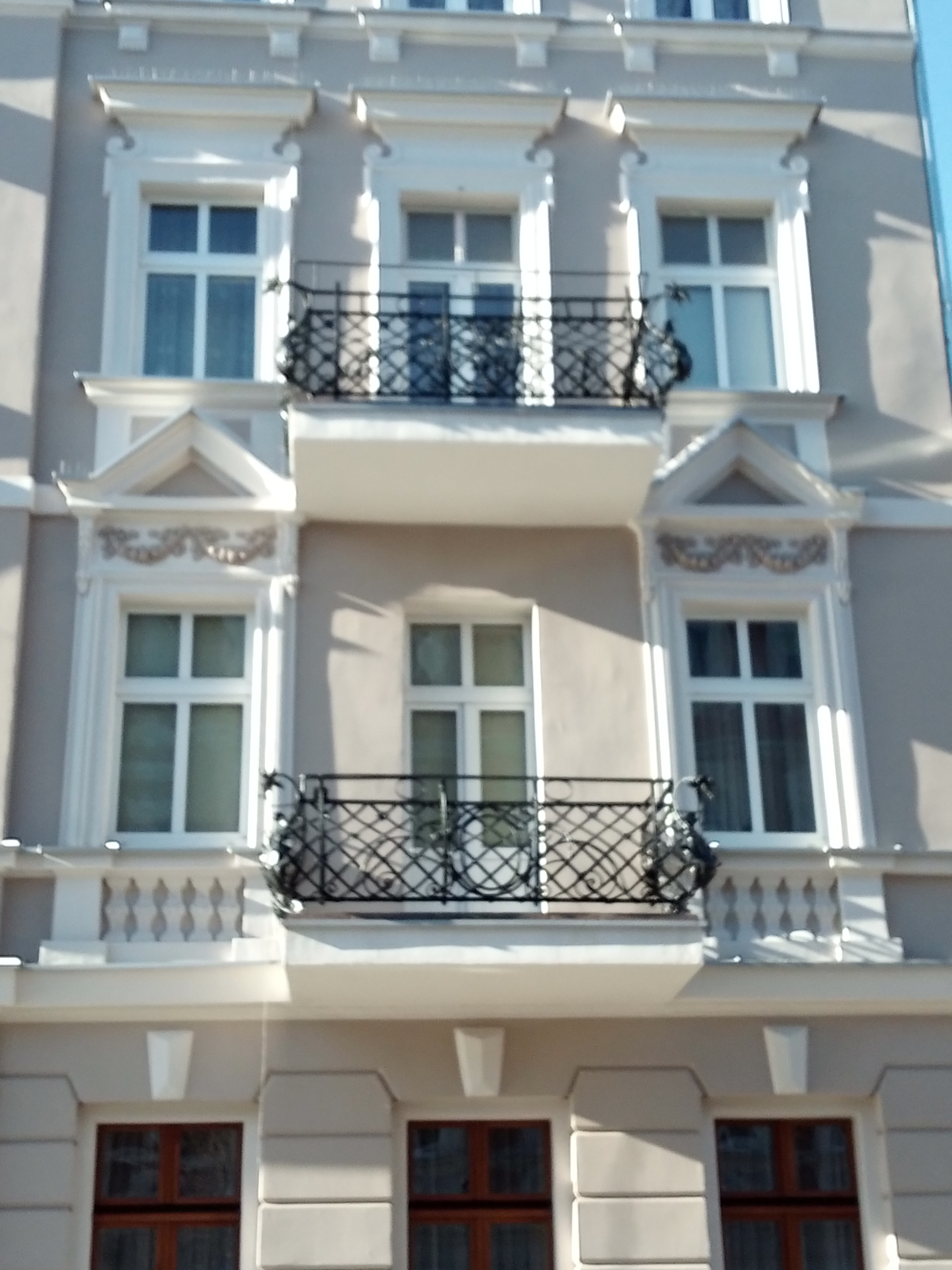
Detail of the balconies

Tenement at 21

Registered on Kuyavian-Pomeranian Voivodeship heritage list, Nr.A/1783, issued on December 21, 2020

1895-1896

Eclecticism

August Günther, a merchant, was the first owner of this building. His abode was at nearby 4 Elizabeth Markt (13 Piastowski Square). On 1 October 1, 1927, the premises housed (till 1947) the first plant of the Warsztaty Precyzyjno-Mechaniczne i Optyczne (Precision-Mechanical and Optical Workshops) which will become the firm TELFA, then "TELKOM TELFA", acquired by Nokia in 2016.

The eclectic style building is particularly noticeable by the grand portal that a slight avant-corps reveals, flanked by adorned pilasters and overhung by two levels of balustrades. A renovation occurred in 2018.

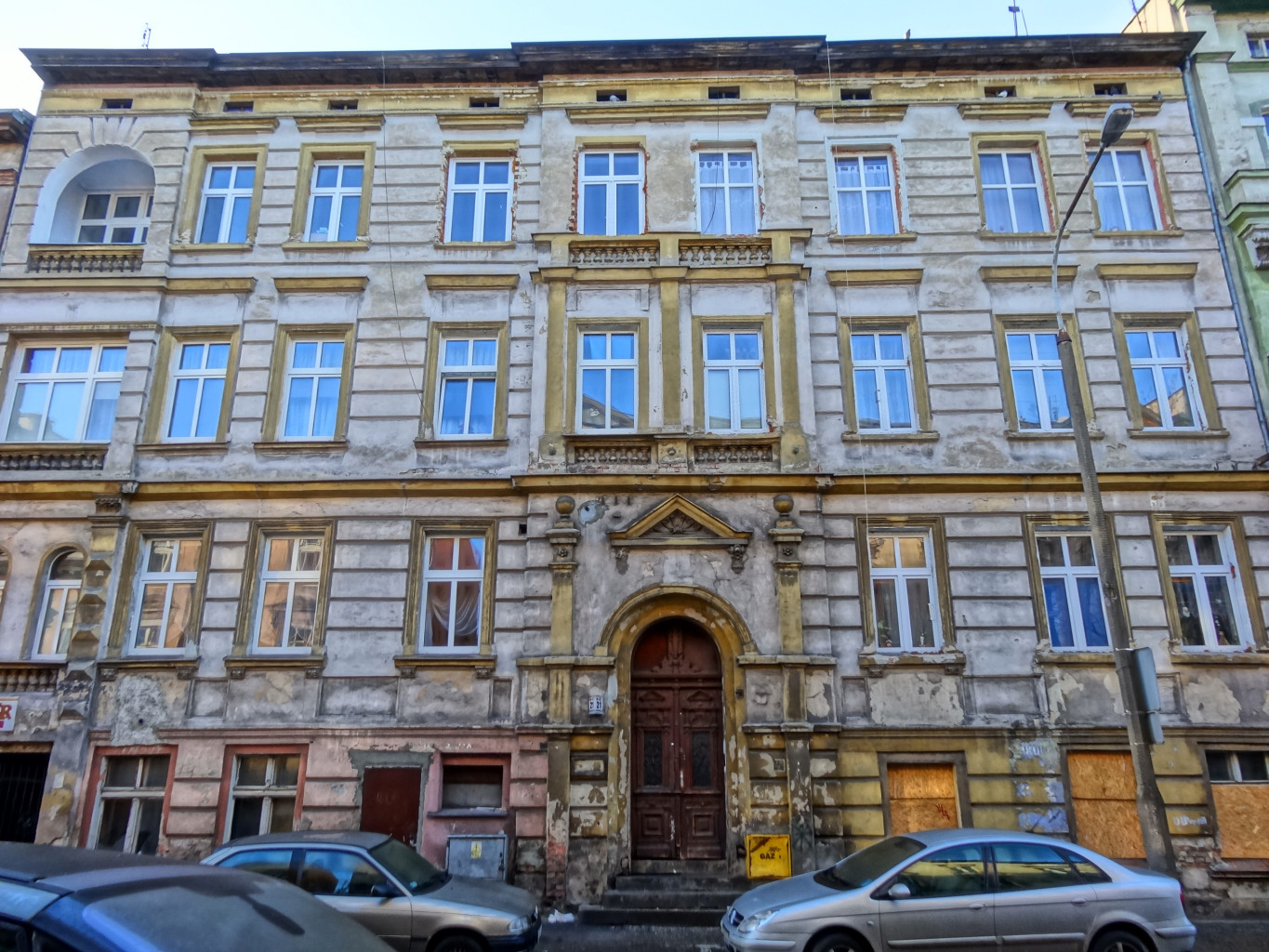
Main frontage

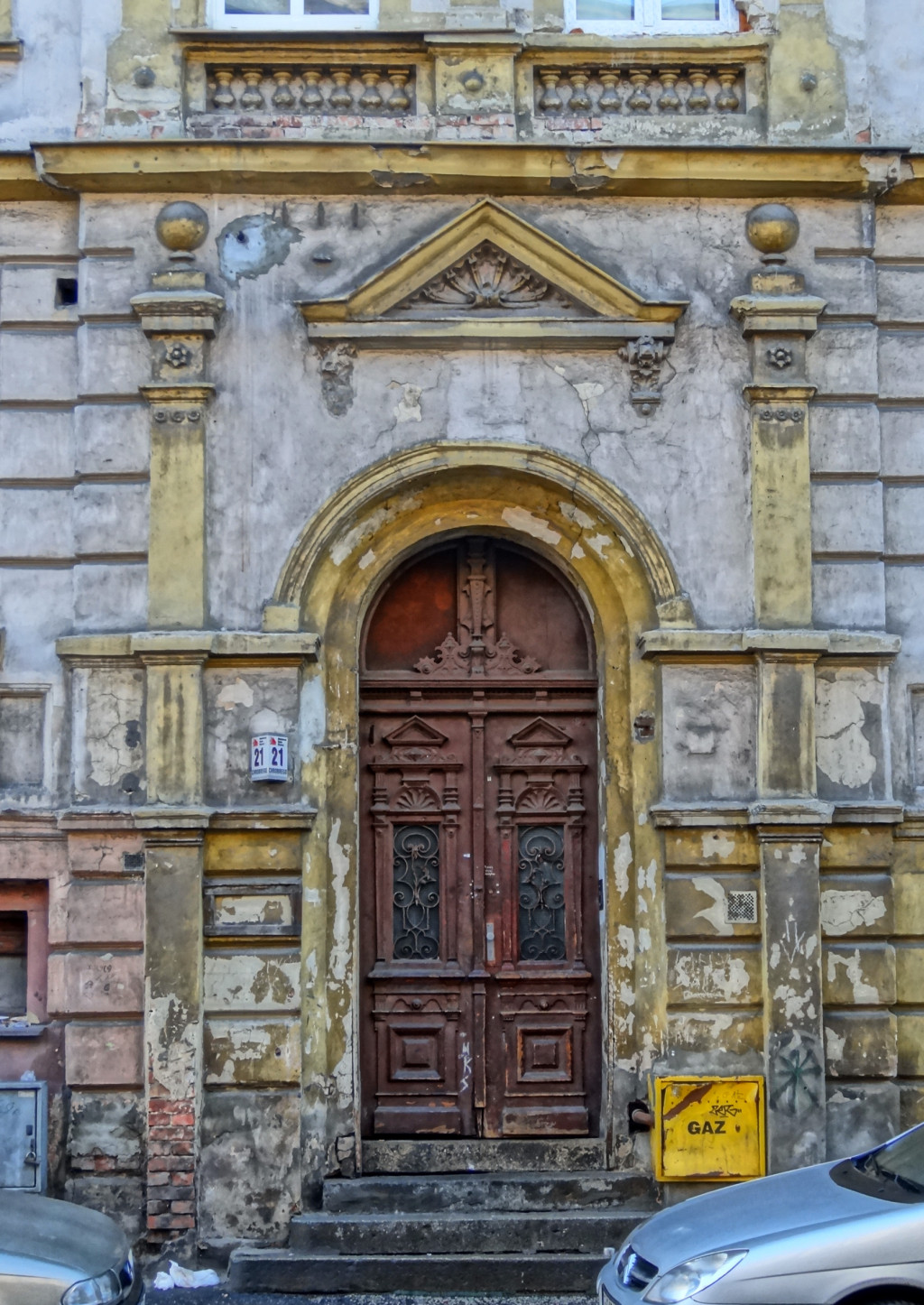
Portal

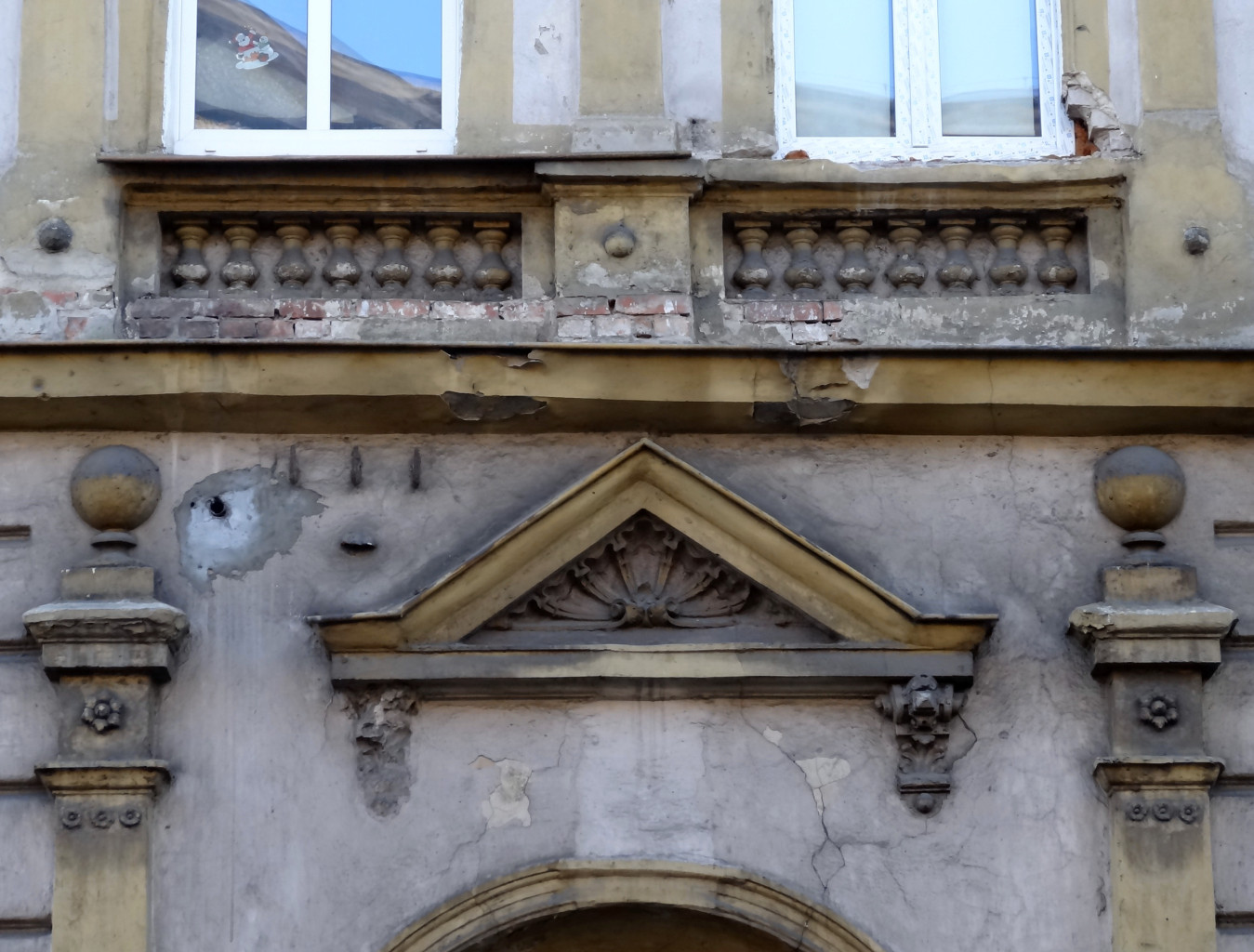
Details of the decoration

Carl Gau tenement at 22

1896

Eclecticism

Carl Gau was a painter who lived in the premises from 1896 to the end of the First World War. In this tenement lived Henryk Gorzechowski, an officer from the 16th Greater Poland Uhlan Regiment in Bydgoszcz. His wife Julia was a soprano, who accompanied Ludwik Regamey during recitals. The family transferred to Gdynia in August 1931. Henryk Gorzechowski was killed in 1940 during the Katyn massacre.

The main frontage exhibits, inter alia, a large bay window and loggia supported by two massive adorned corbels. Many stuccoed details can be noticed on the facade.

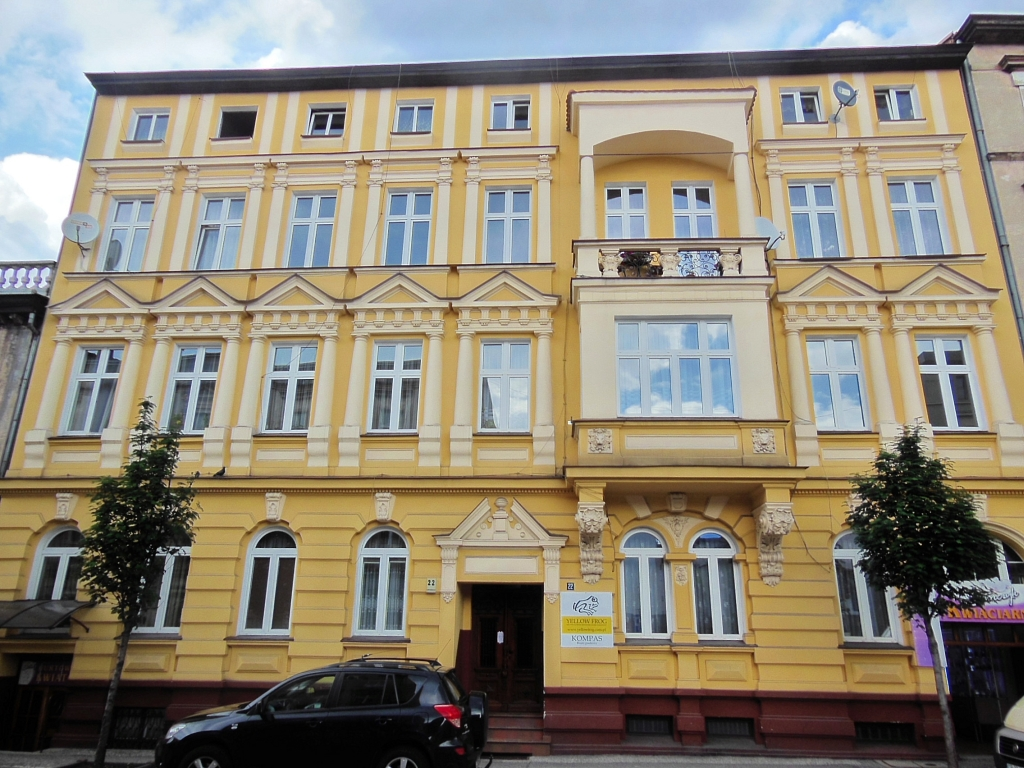
Main elevation

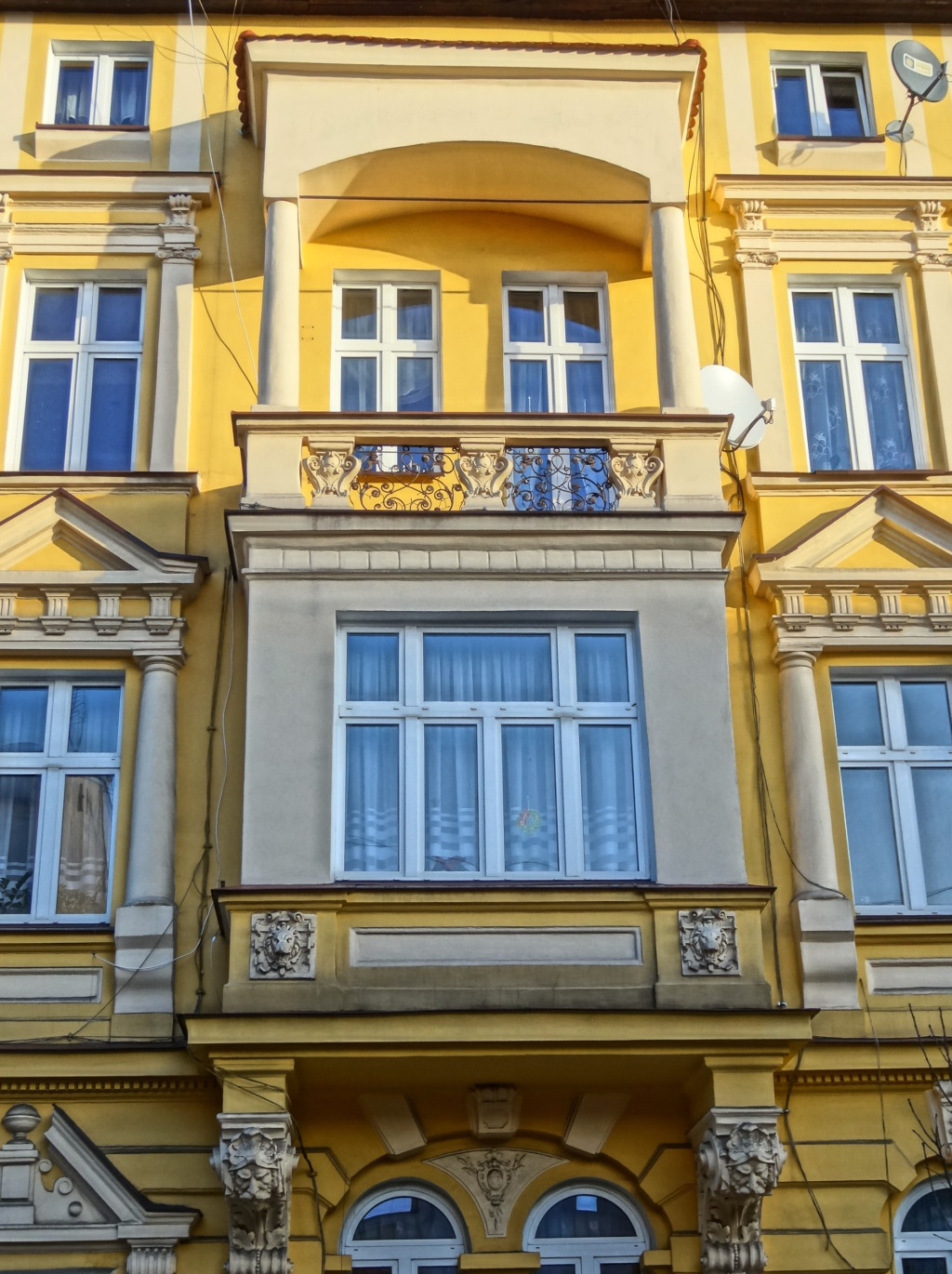
Bay window and loggia

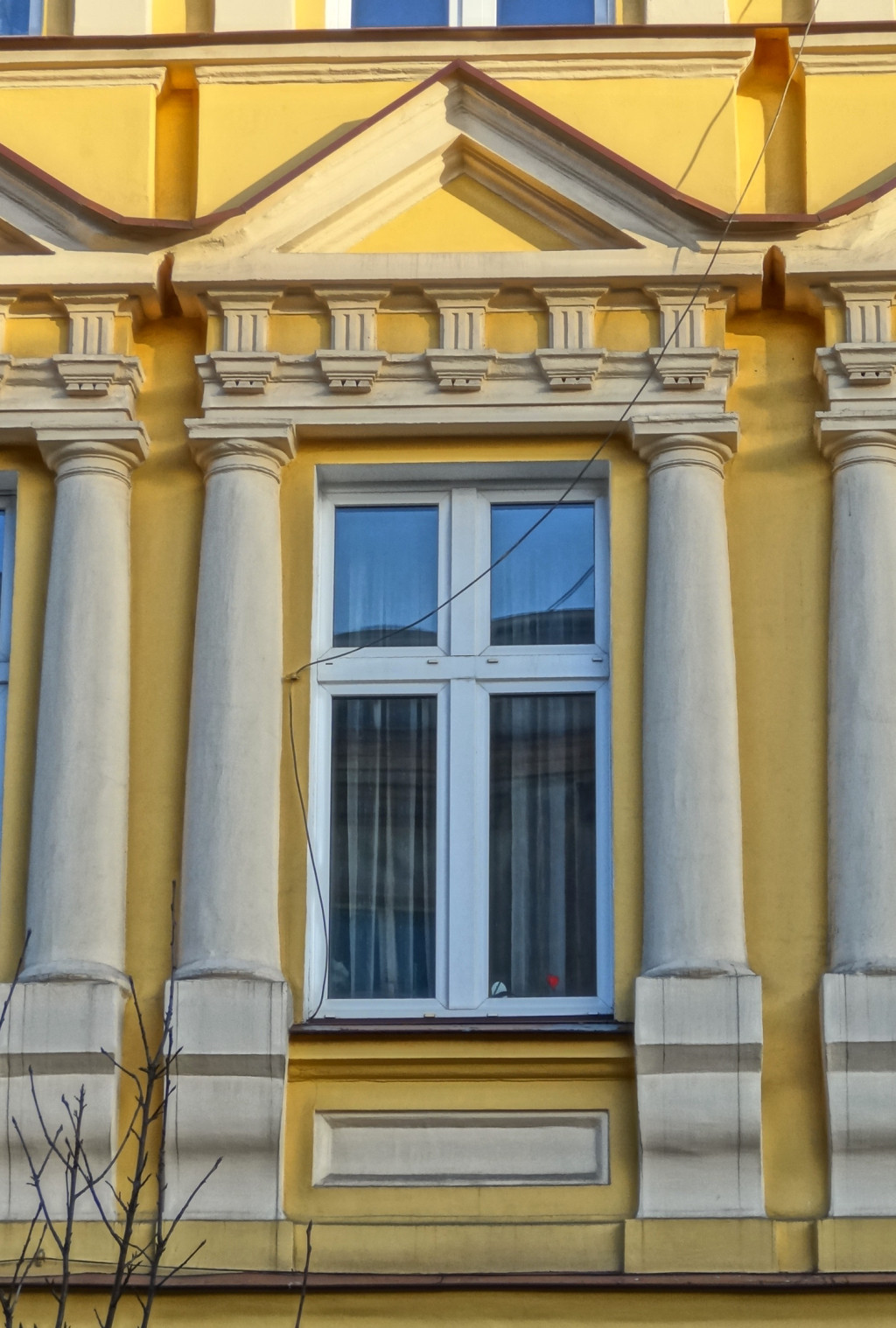
Bedecked window

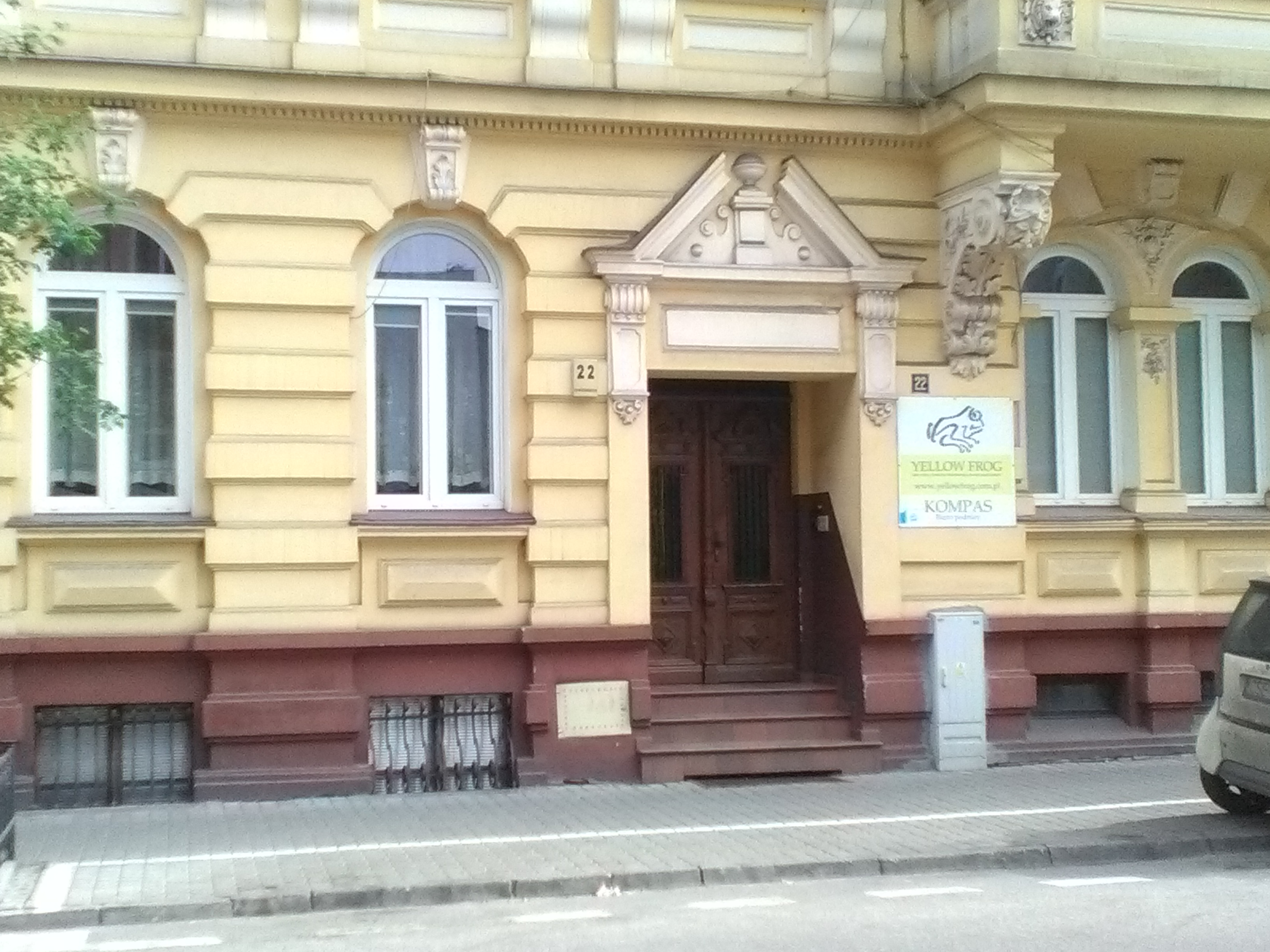
Main entrance portal

Tenement at 23, corner with 11a Piastowski Square

1902-1903

Eclecticism

First address was 5 Elisabeth Markt, the first owner was a rentier, Arthur ßaulini, who resided at neighbouring Nr.4 (now Nr.13). In 1910, the edifice moved to the hands of Carl Rose, a famous architect in Bromberg living on Danzigerstraße 29.

The renovated corner house displays several architectural details, characteristic of Eclecticism. One can underline in particular:

- the corner tower, with a large balustrade-corbel featured balcony, topped by a tented roof cupola;
- bay windows on each facade, with loggias, columns and a pediment showing a floral decorated tympanum;
- round pediments on the first floor, with floral ornament.
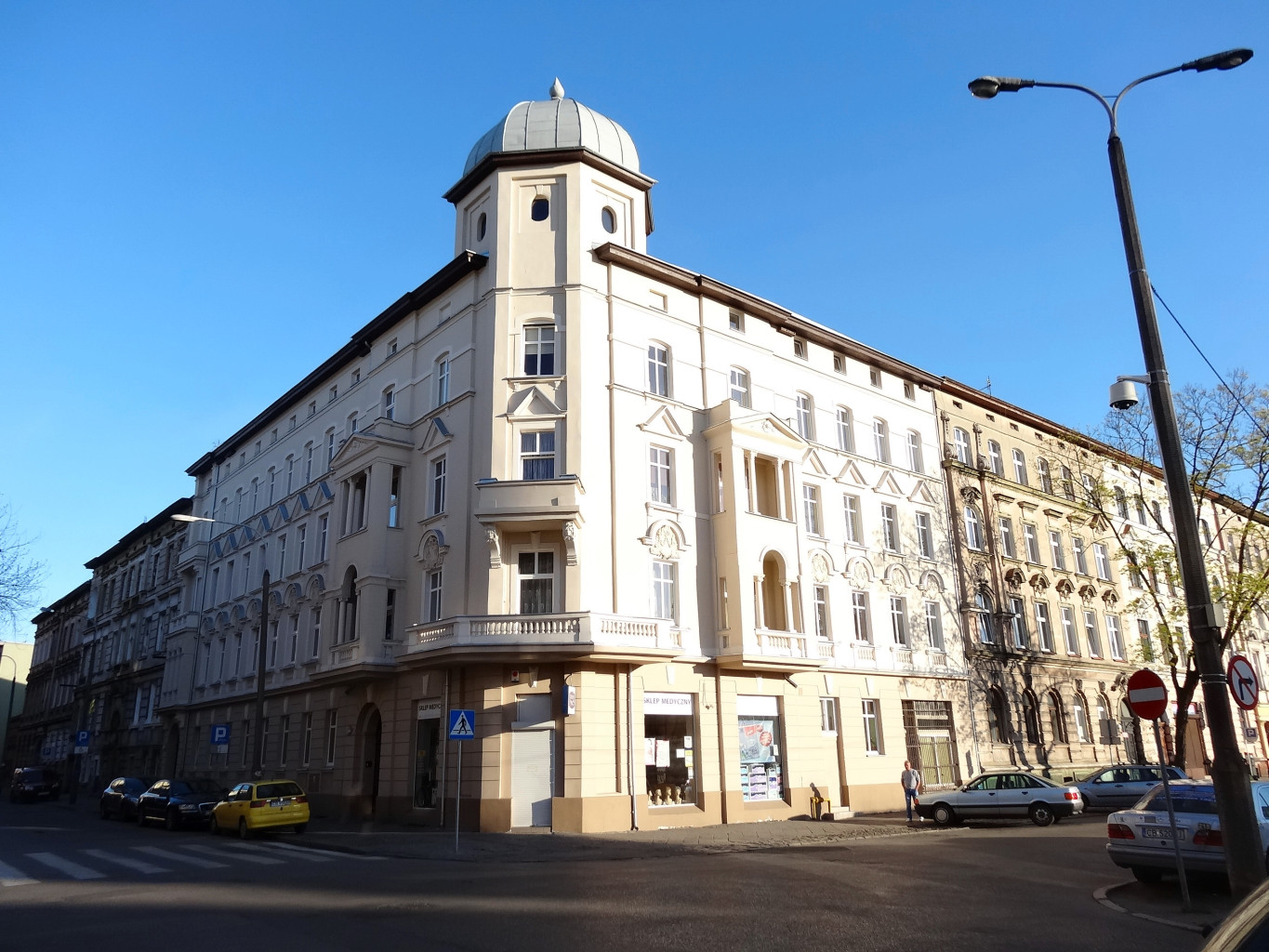
Corner view

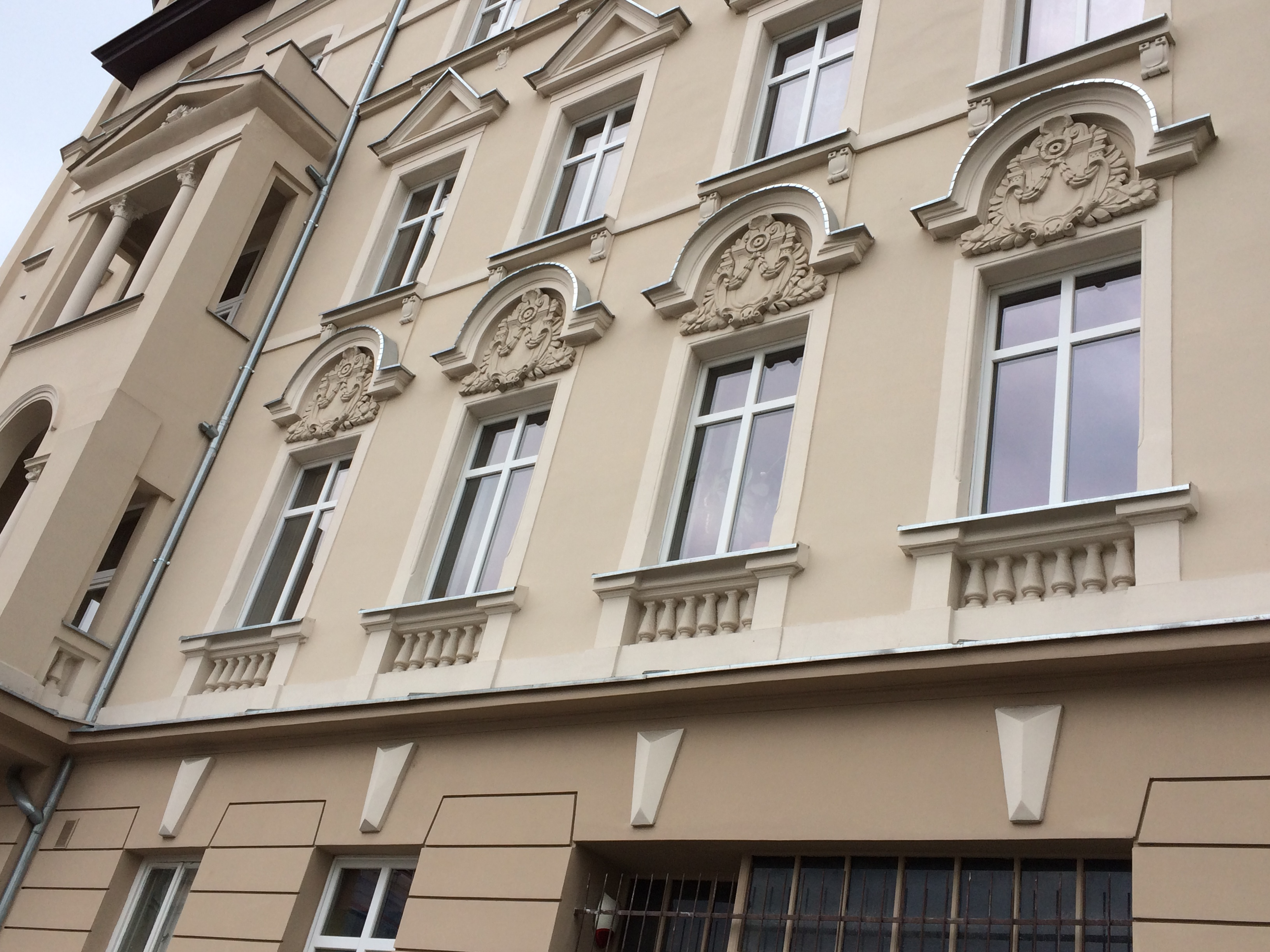
Detailed view from the square

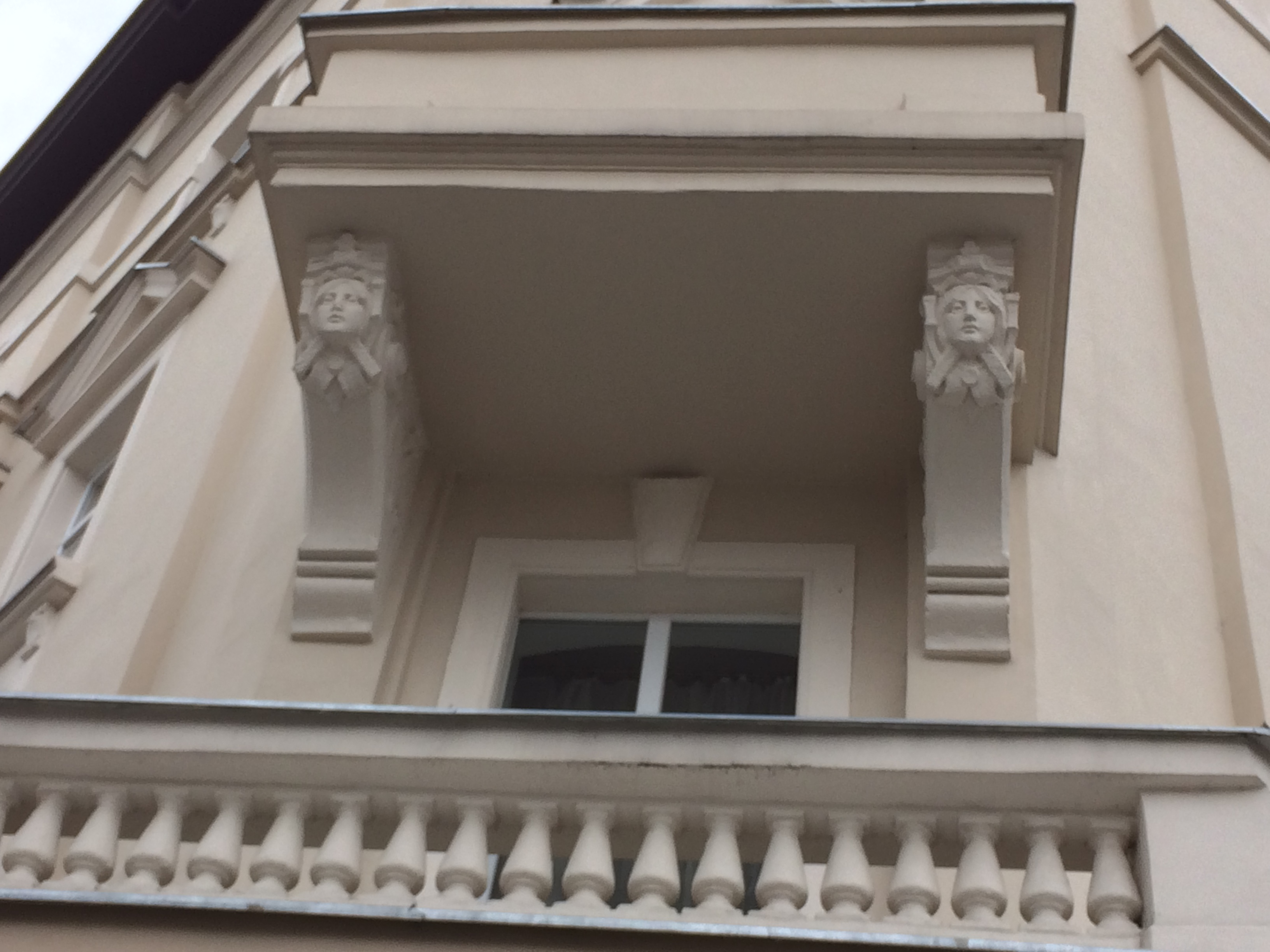
Detail of the balcony

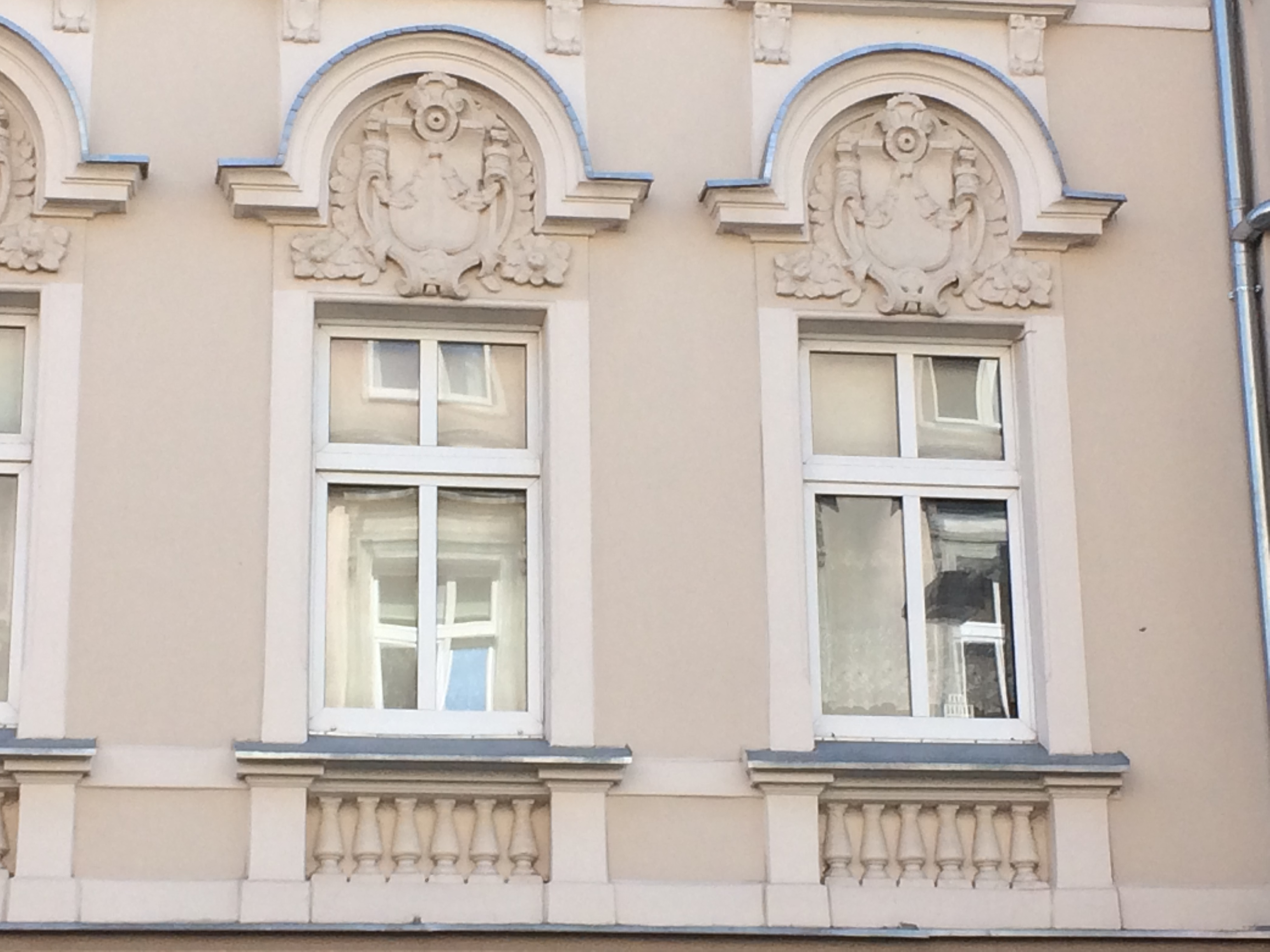
Detail of a window balustrade and pediment

Tenement at 24

ca 1890

Eclecticism

The building's initial landlord was Emma Minarski, the widow of a train driver.

The tenement facade is asymmetric, with a regular roof-topped left side but a shorter right side crowned by a large terrace fenced by a balustrade. The ensemble is bare of architectural details, except upper corbels below the eaves.

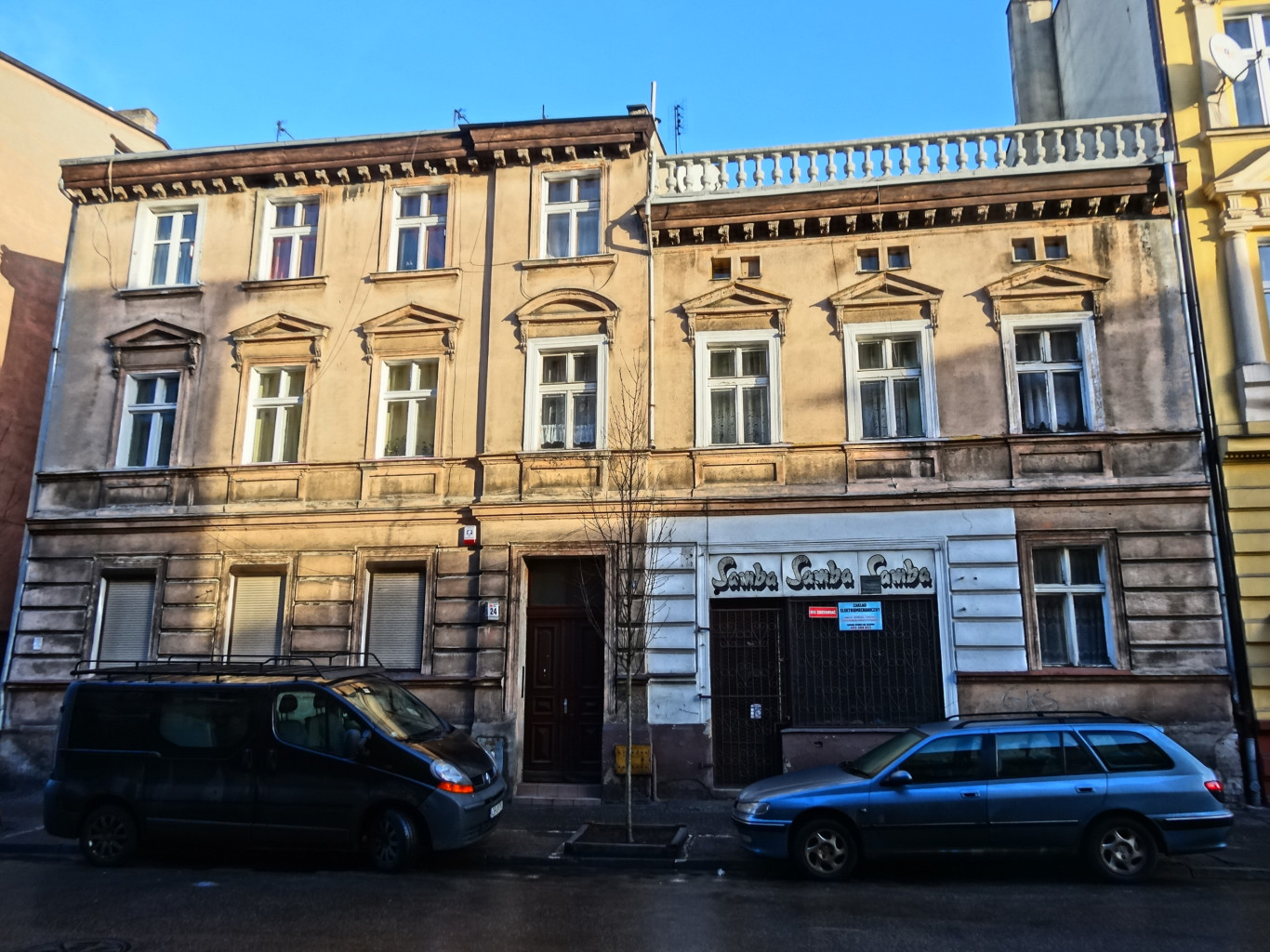
Main frontage

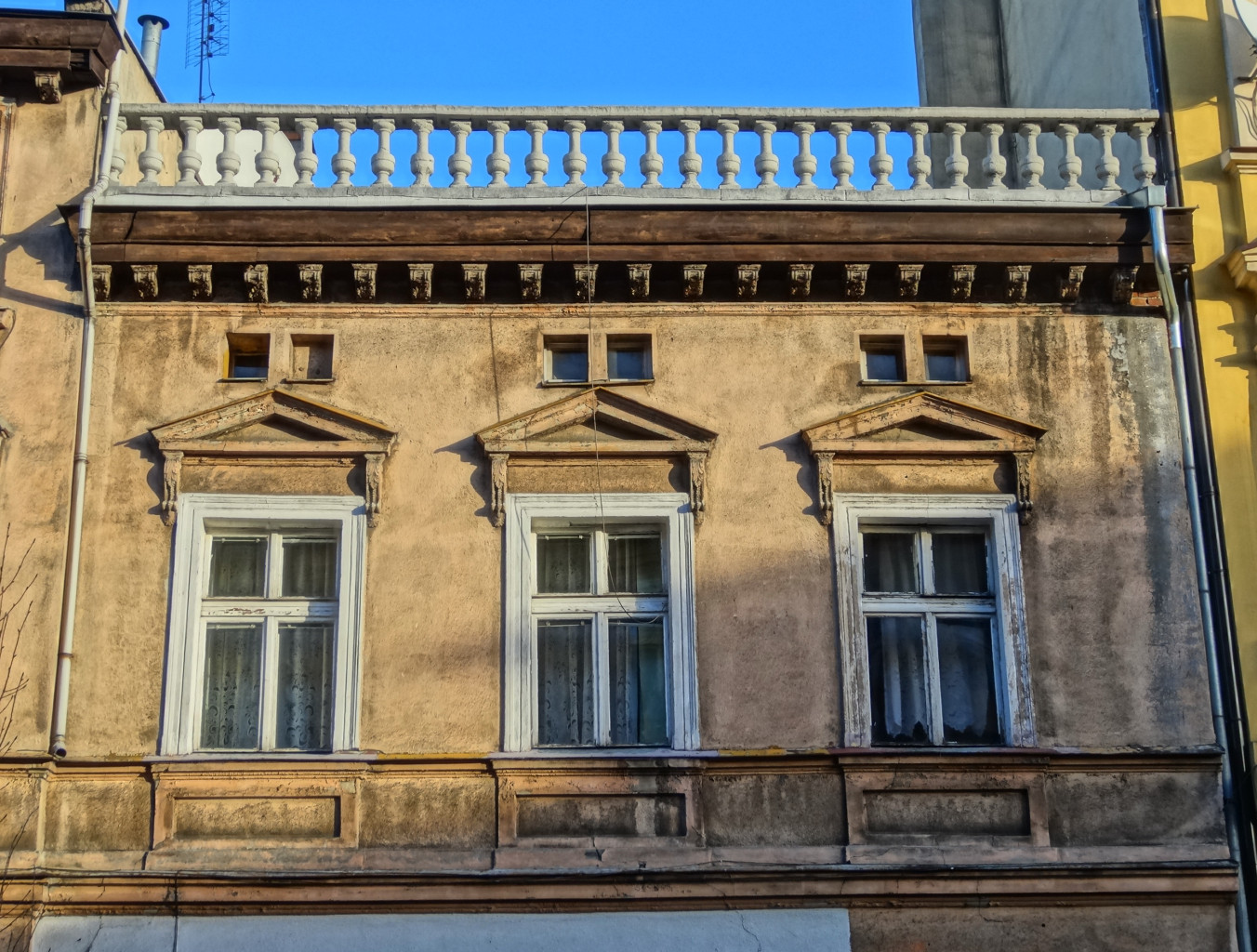
Detail of the balustrade

Valentin Minge tenement at 26

1891-1892

Eclecticism, elements of Art Nouveau

The tenement, then at 15 Schleinitz Straße, was commissioned by Valentin Minge, a painter who lived there till the outbreak of WWI. In 1897, he asked Bromberg architect Józef Święcicki to widen the windows giving onto the street. In the late 1930s, the family of Kazimierz Gaca, a Polish cryptanalyst and officer who participated in breaking the Enigma machine.

Nicely refurbished in the first quarter of 2020, the main frontage highlights are:

- the large portal flanked by pilasters and crowned by a coat of arms bearing the ancient house numbering 15;
- the ornamentation of the openings on the first floor;
- the two symmetric avant-corps, carrying on the second level an enhanced decoration of the windows (pilasters, pediments).
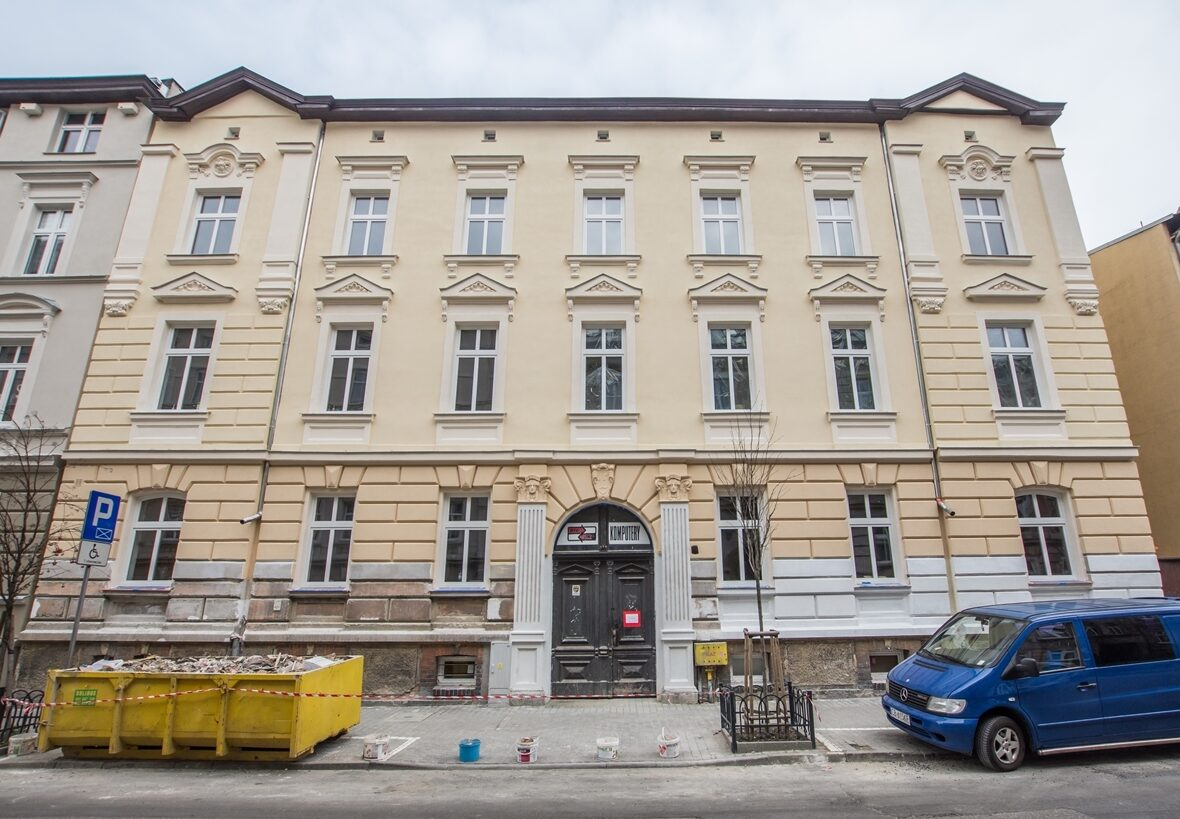
Main elevation after renovation

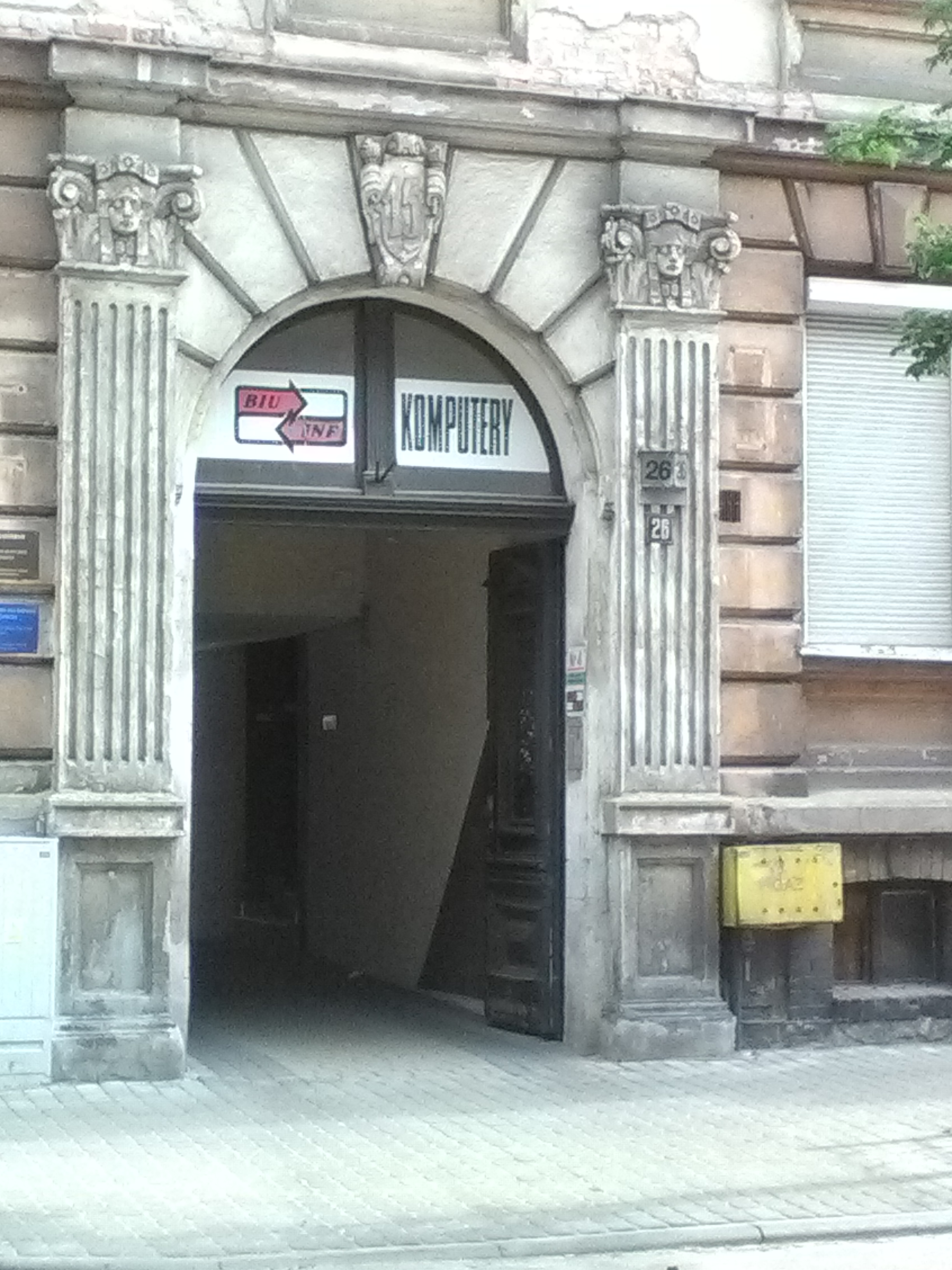
Main entrance before renovation

Tenement at 28, corner with Wileńska street

1889-1890

Eclecticism

The tenement was initially registered as 1 Boiestraße (2 Wileńska street). It was the property of Alexander Olszynski, a master carpenter, who also owned a second house in Wileńska street.

The renovation performed in 2019-2020 underlines the eclectic character of the architecture, with some delicate stucco cartouches on the first floor and below the eaves. The ensemble echoes in the best way the facing building at 11 Piastowski Square.

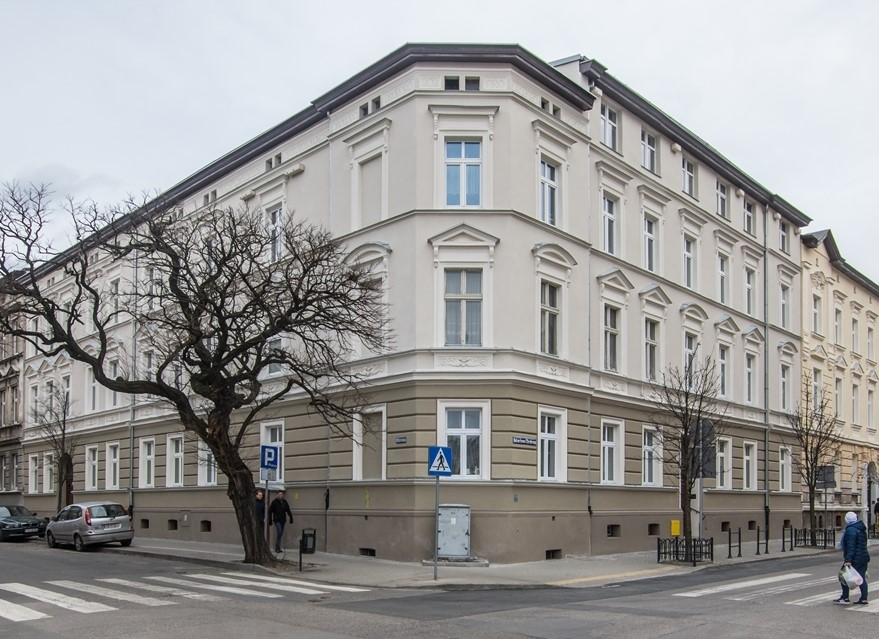
View of both elevations

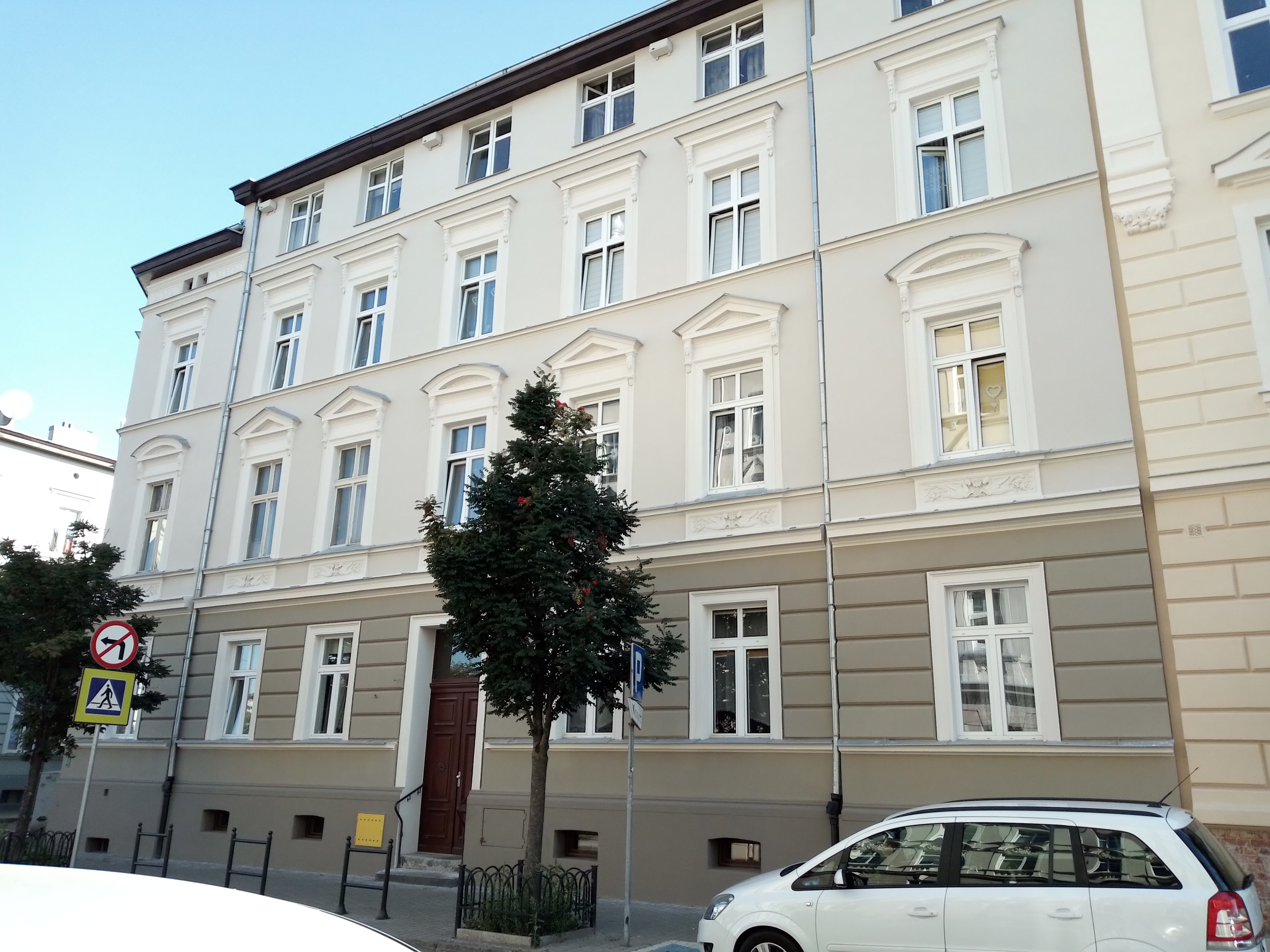
Frontage on Chrobrego street

== See also ==
- Bydgoszcz
- Piastowski Square
- Sienkiewicza Street
- Pomorska Street
- Józef Święcicki
- (in Polish) Telfa Telekom

== Bibliography ==
- (in Polish) Umiński, Janusz (1996). Bydgoszcz. Przewodnik. Bydgoszcz: Regionalny Oddział PTTK "Szlak Brdy".
