= Słowackiego Street, Bydgoszcz =

Street in Bydgoszcz, Poland

Coordinates: 53.1299°N 18.0091°E

Słowackiego Street
Bydgoszcz
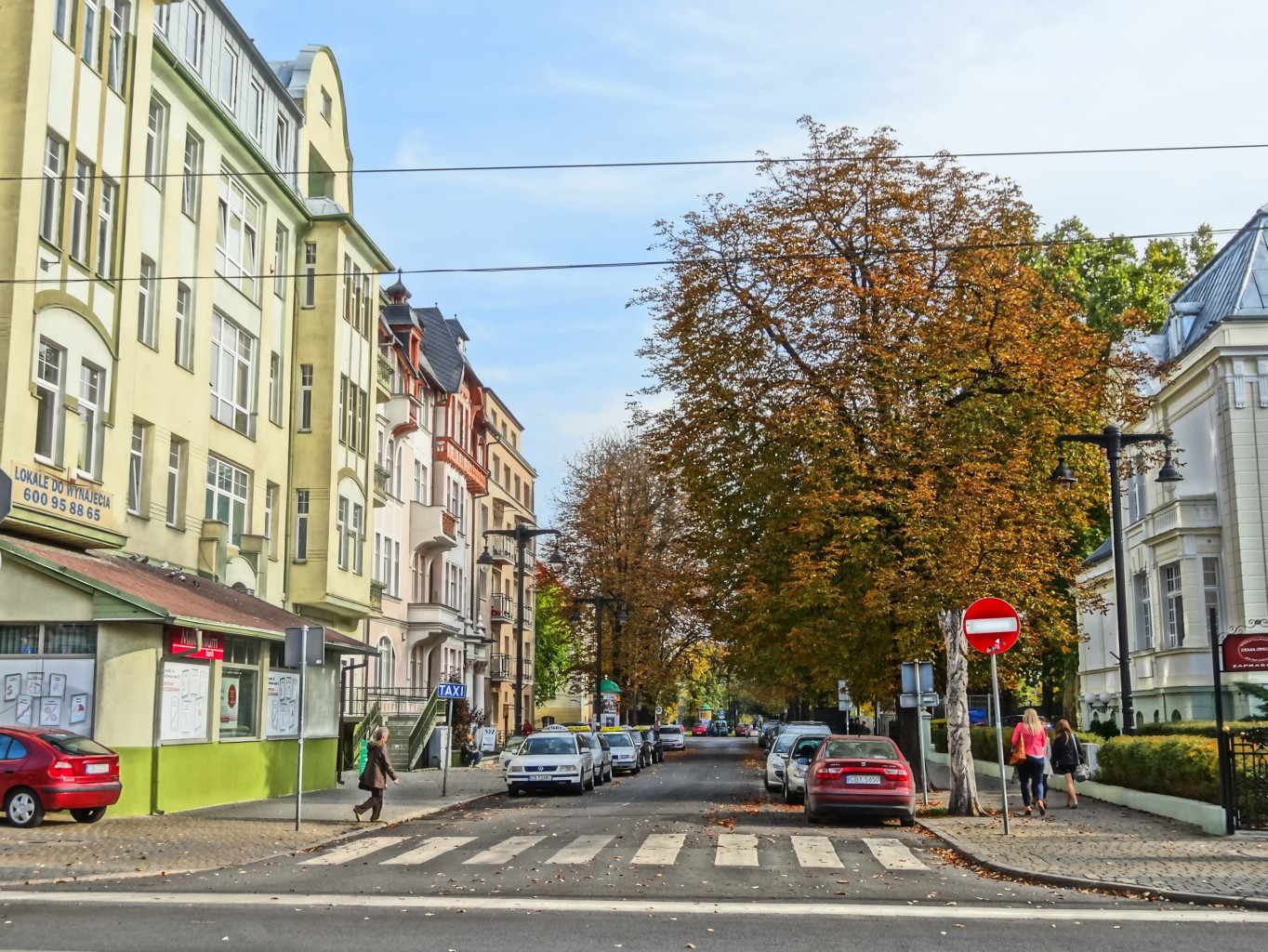
- View from Gdańska Street

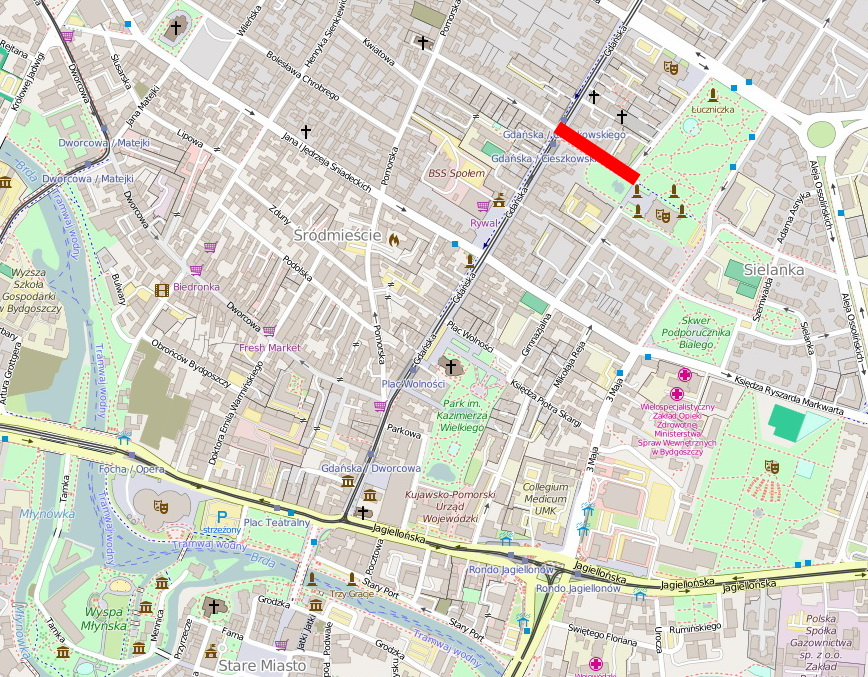
- Location of the street in Bydgoszcz
- Native name: Ulica Juliusza Słowackiego w Bydgoszczy (Polish)
- Former name: Bismarck Straße
- Part of: Bydgoszcz
- Namesake: Juliusz Słowacki
- Owner: City of Bydgoszcz
- Length: 150 m (490 ft)
- Area: Downtown
- Location: Bydgoszcz, Poland

Słowackiego Street is a street located in Bydgoszcz, Poland. Despite its short length, many of its buildings are either registered on Kuyavian-Pomeranian Voivodeship heritage list, or are part of Bydgoszcz local history.

== Location ==
The street is located in downtown Bydgoszcz. It connects the main thoroughfare Gdańska Street to the green area of Jan Kochanowski Park in Bydgoszcz and the Pomeranian Philharmonic building.

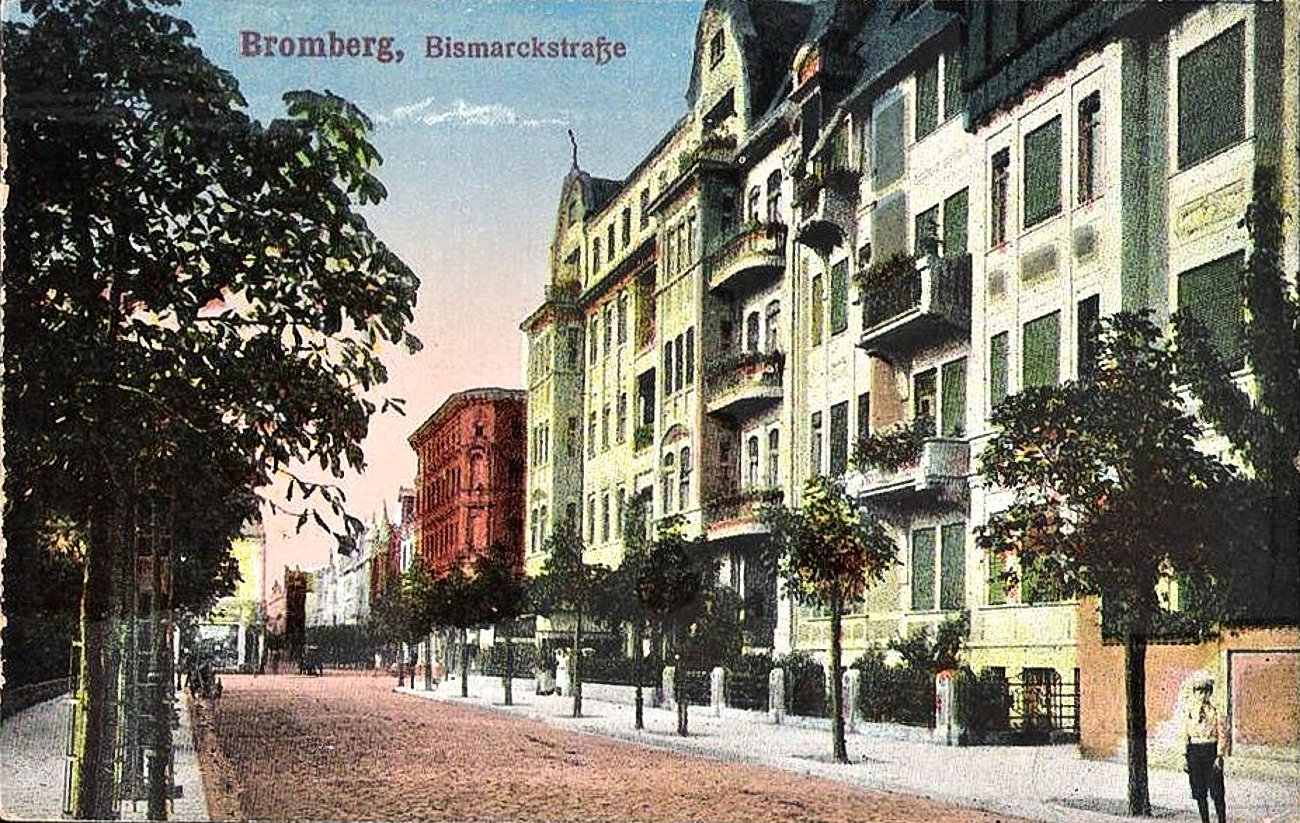
Bismarck Straße ca 1908

== History ==
Although lined up with Cieszkowskiego Street, Słowackiego Street was established much later. The street appears on Bromberg maps between 1900 and 1908, boosted by city's main expansion, thanks to the development of the Prussian Eastern Railway. City population grew from 12,900 inhabitants in 1852 to 57,700 inhabitants in 1910.

Słowackiego Street is listed as Bismarck Straße on Bromberg address book in 1905 for the first time: only the administrative building of the district, playing also the role of a courthouse (German: kreishaus), is mentioned there. In 1906, the street bears already five numbers, almost as many as today.

At the time, Bismarck Straße led from Danziger Straße to Bismarck Platz, where stands now the Philarmonia building, and further on to Eigenheim straße A, today's Kopernika Street.

=== Naming ===
Through history, the street bore the following names:

- 1905–1920, Bismarck Straße, from Otto von Bismarck;
- 1920–1939, Ulica Słowackiego;
- 1939–1945, Bismarck Straße;
- Since 1945, Ulica Słowackiego.

Current namesake refers to Juliusz Słowacki (1809–1849) a Polish Romantic poet, one of the "Three Bards" of Polish literature (with Adam Mickiewicz and Zygmunt Krasiński), considered as a major figure in the Polish Romantic period, and the father of modern Polish drama.

== Main places and buildings ==
=== Tenement at 1, corner with Gdańska Street ===
1907–1908

Modern architecture

The house was built in 1905–1906 by architect Alfred Schleusener, for a retired colonel of the Prussian army, Robert Grundtmann.

The building is decorated in the style of early modernism.

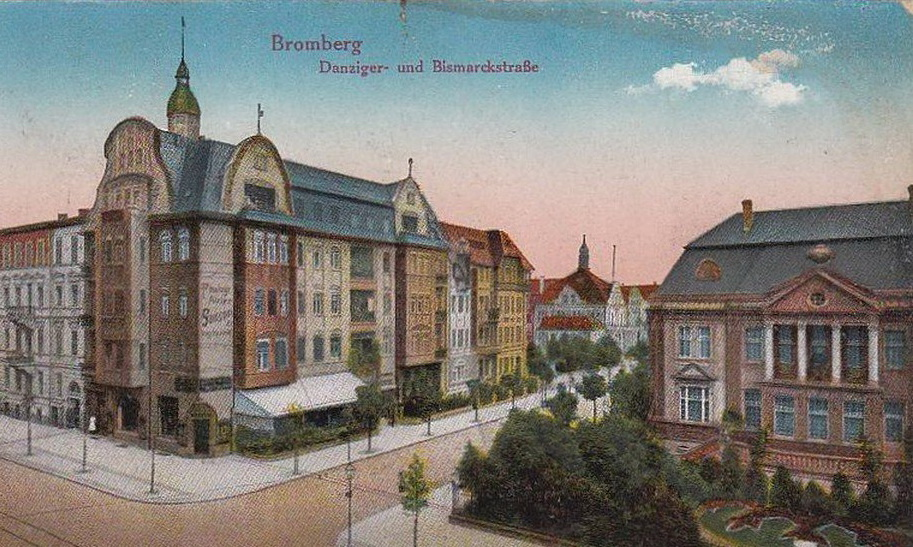
View ca 1907

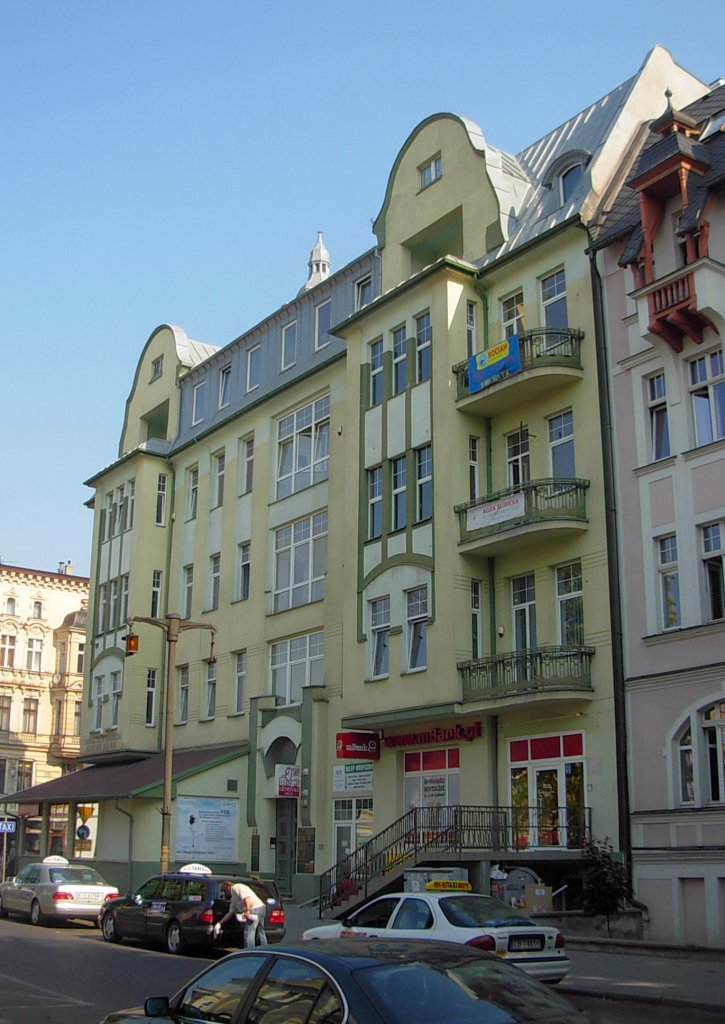
Facade on Słowackiego street

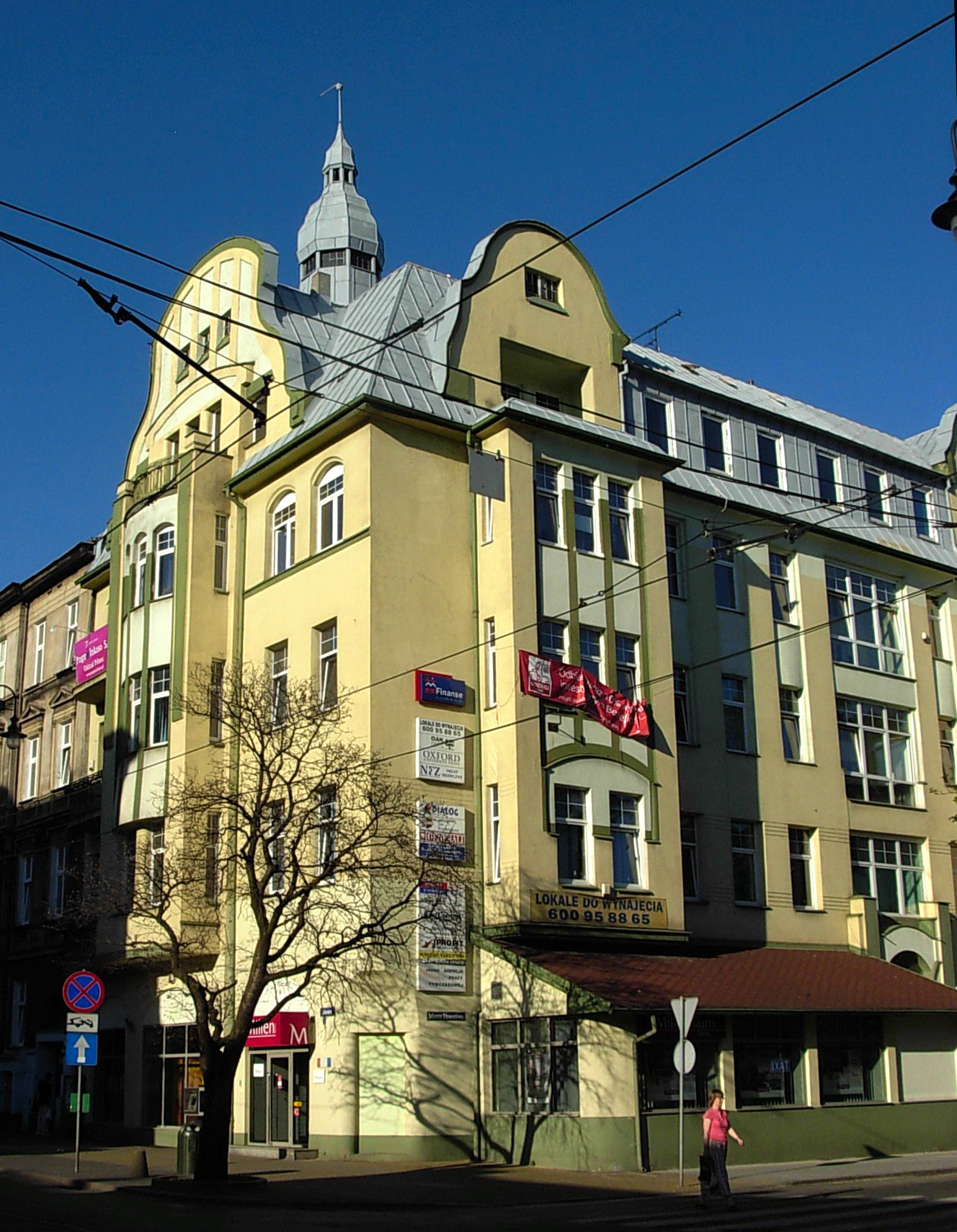
Corner view

=== Villa Wilhelm Blumwe, at Gdańska Street 50, corner with Słowackiego Street ===
Registered on Kuyavian-Pomeranian Voivodeship heritage list, Nr.601306-Reg.A/1129 (8 July 1992 - 29 September 1998)

1900–1904

Neo-Renaissance

The building was erected between 1900 and 1904 by architect Hildebrandt from Berlin. The investor was Wilhelm Blumwe, son of Carl Blumwe, a wealthy industrialist from Bydgoszcz. Carl Brumwe set up in 1865 a factory producing machines for wood located at Nakielska street 53, in Bydgoszcz. Carl Blumwe also had his own villa built nearby his factory in Nakielska Street. Since 1 May 1945 the villa hosts the seat and studios of the local radio, Radio PiK.

The building has the classical shape of a palace, with a style referring to Palladian architecture, popular in Europe in the late 19th century.

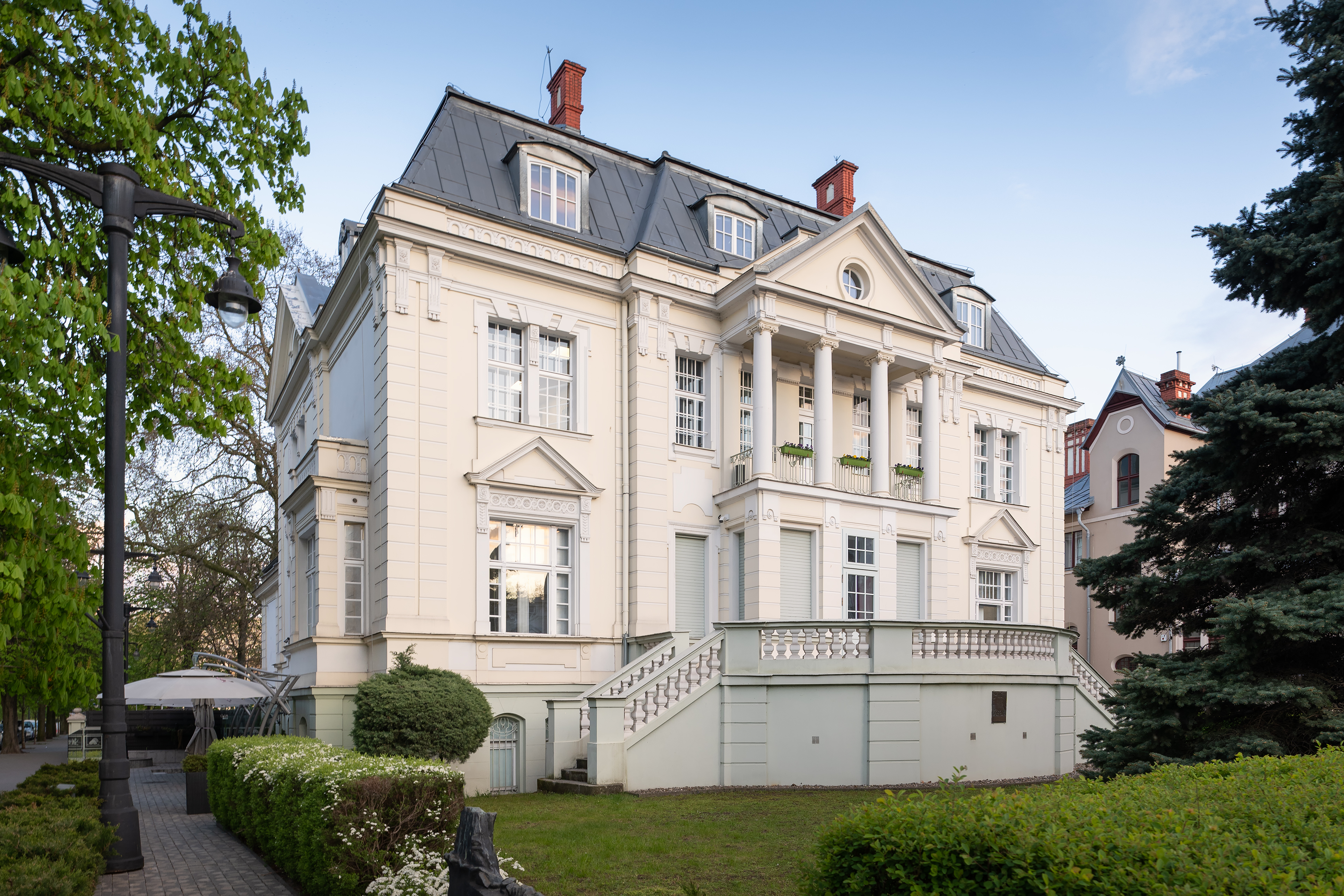
View from Gdańska Street

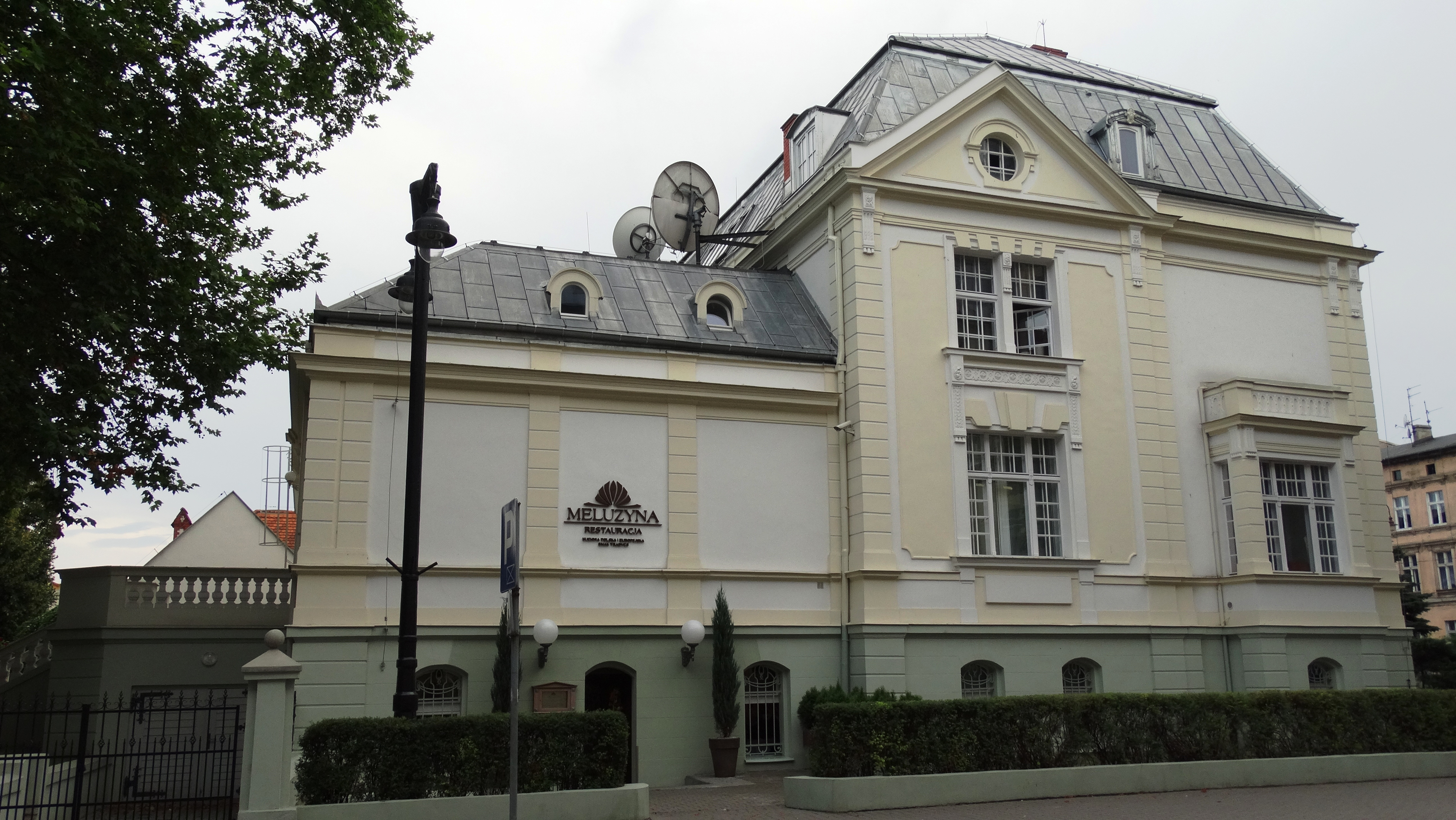
Facade on Słowackiego Street

=== Tenement at 3 ===
1904–1905, by Paul Böhm

Eclecticism, Historicism

The tenement was built at the beginning of the 20th century; its first owner was Paul Böhm, a famous Bromberg architect. He designed several other buildings in the city (Cieszkowskiego Street 1, 3 and Weyssenhoff Square 5). After the re-creation of the Polish State (1920), the tenement housed a part of the district administrative offices, together with the building at Nr.7: for this purpose, it underwent an interior remodeling led by architect Jan Kossowski. Today, it hosts the Kuyavian-Pomeranian Voivodeship Health care services.

The facade is characteristic of the eclectic style, mixing several references altogether. On the ground floor, the portal shows Neo-Baroque influences, with its Corinthian order columns and adorned lintel topped by finials and the large doors with semi-circular glass transom light. The second and third floor display more an early modern style, with clear geometrical shapes, attenuated by a nice wrought iron balcony. The top level abounds with German historicism references, especially by combining materials (plaster, wood, timber framing), shapes (balconies, loggias, ridge turret, dormer) and decoration motifs (Art Nouveau-like pattern). The style recalls clearly nearby tenements in Gdańska Street from architect Fritz Weidner (at 28 and 34).

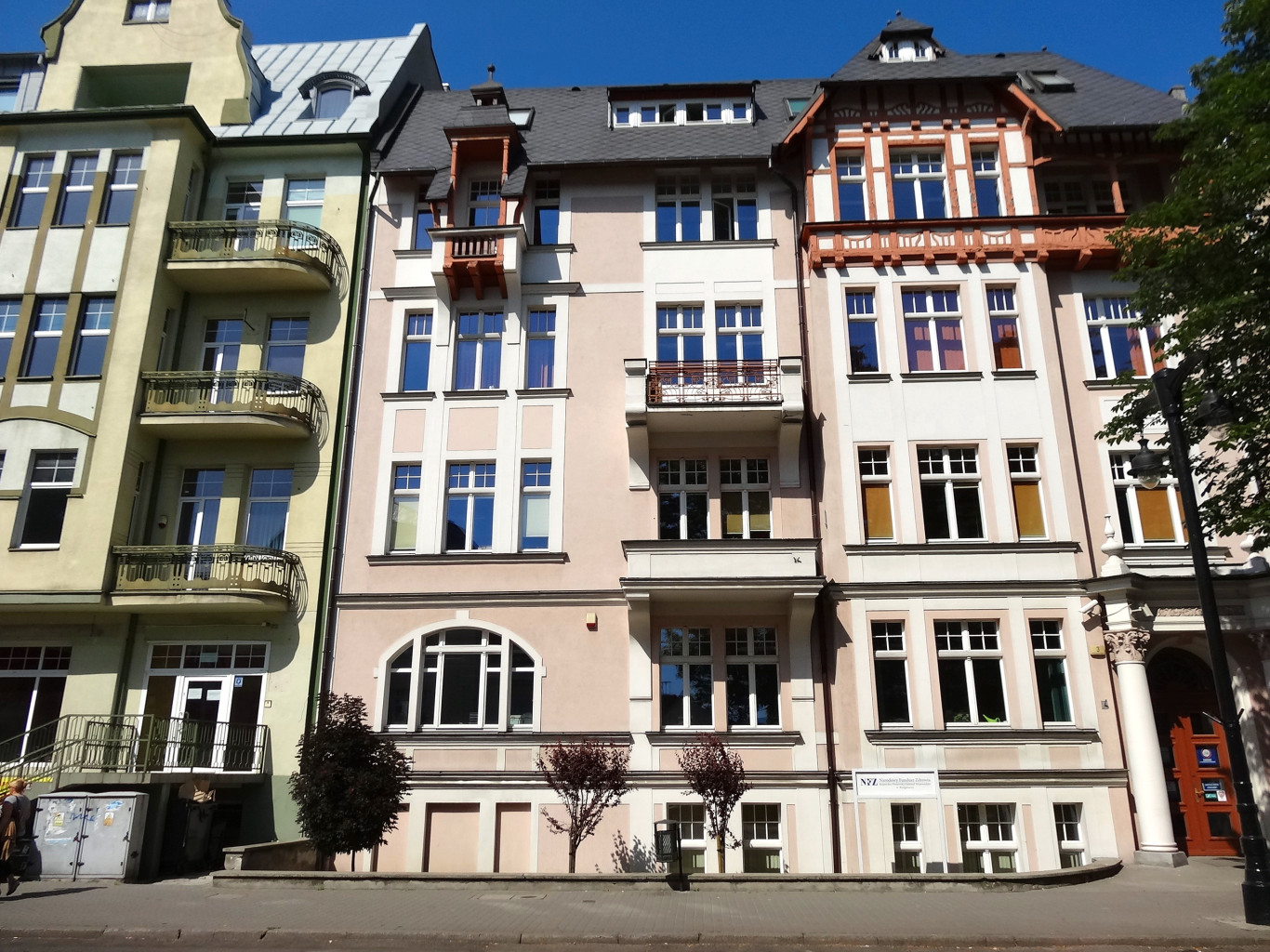
Main elevation

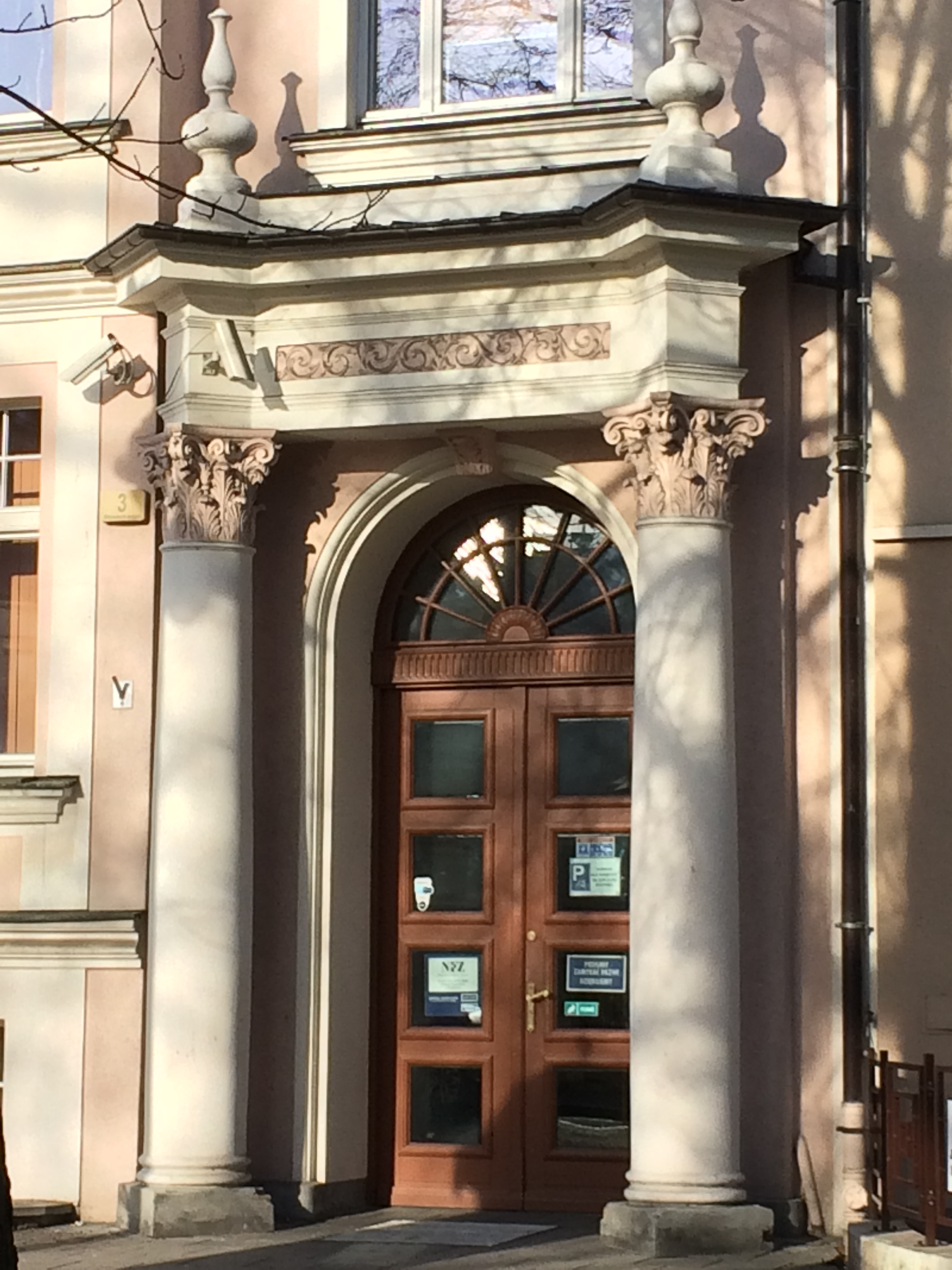
Portal

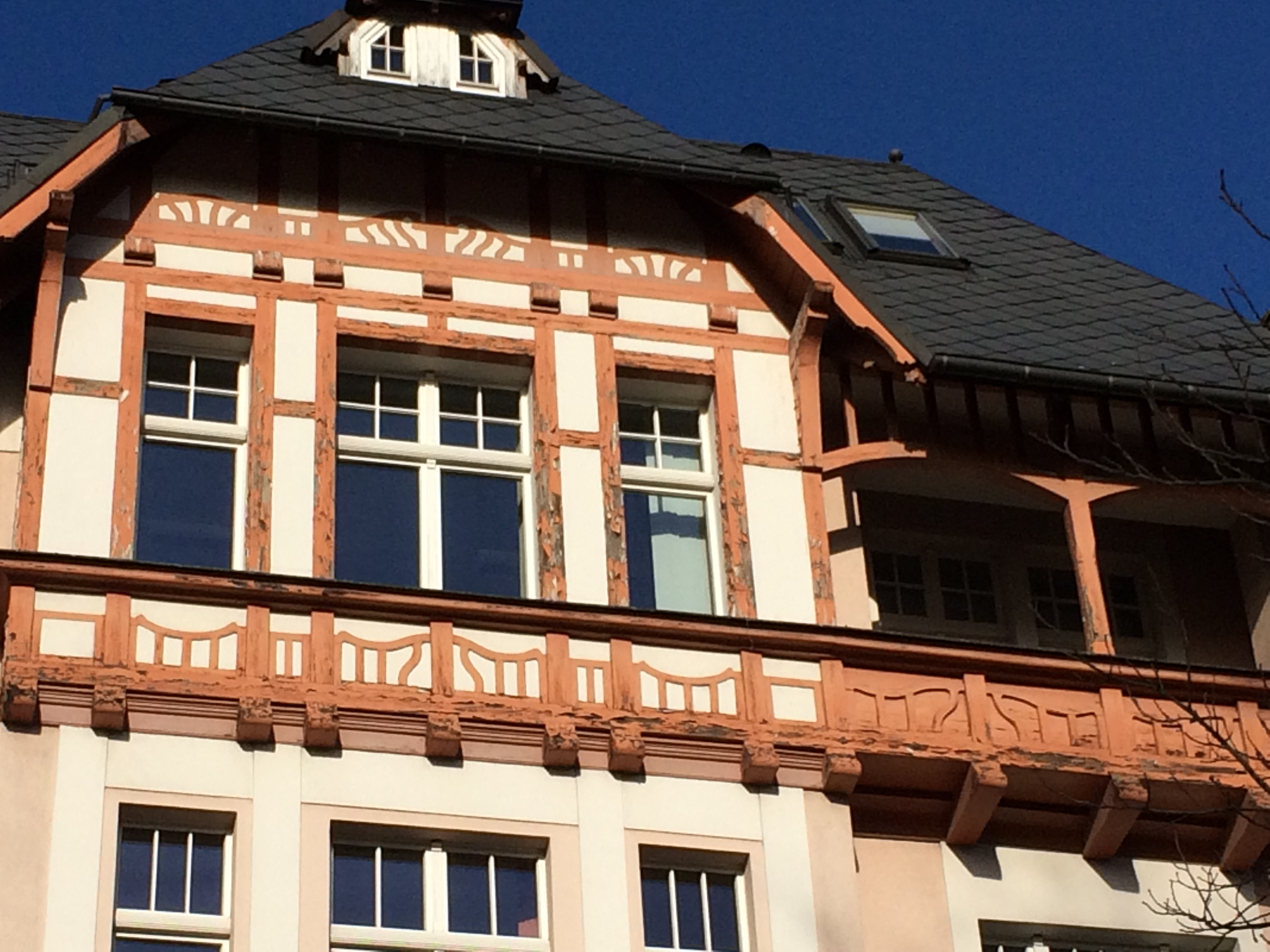
Timber framing detail

=== Bydgoszcz Music Academy building, at 7, corner with 20 Stycznia 1920 Street ===
Registered on Kuyavian-Pomeranian Voivodeship heritage list, Nr.601404-Reg.A/782/1-3 (8 May 1992)

1904–1906

Neo-Baroque

The building has been initially erected to house the administrative services of the district authorities at the beginning of the 20th century. It now accommodates the seat of the Bydgoszcz Music Academy - "Feliks Nowowiejski".

The building presents an eclectic architecture, with a predominance of Neo-Baroque forms.

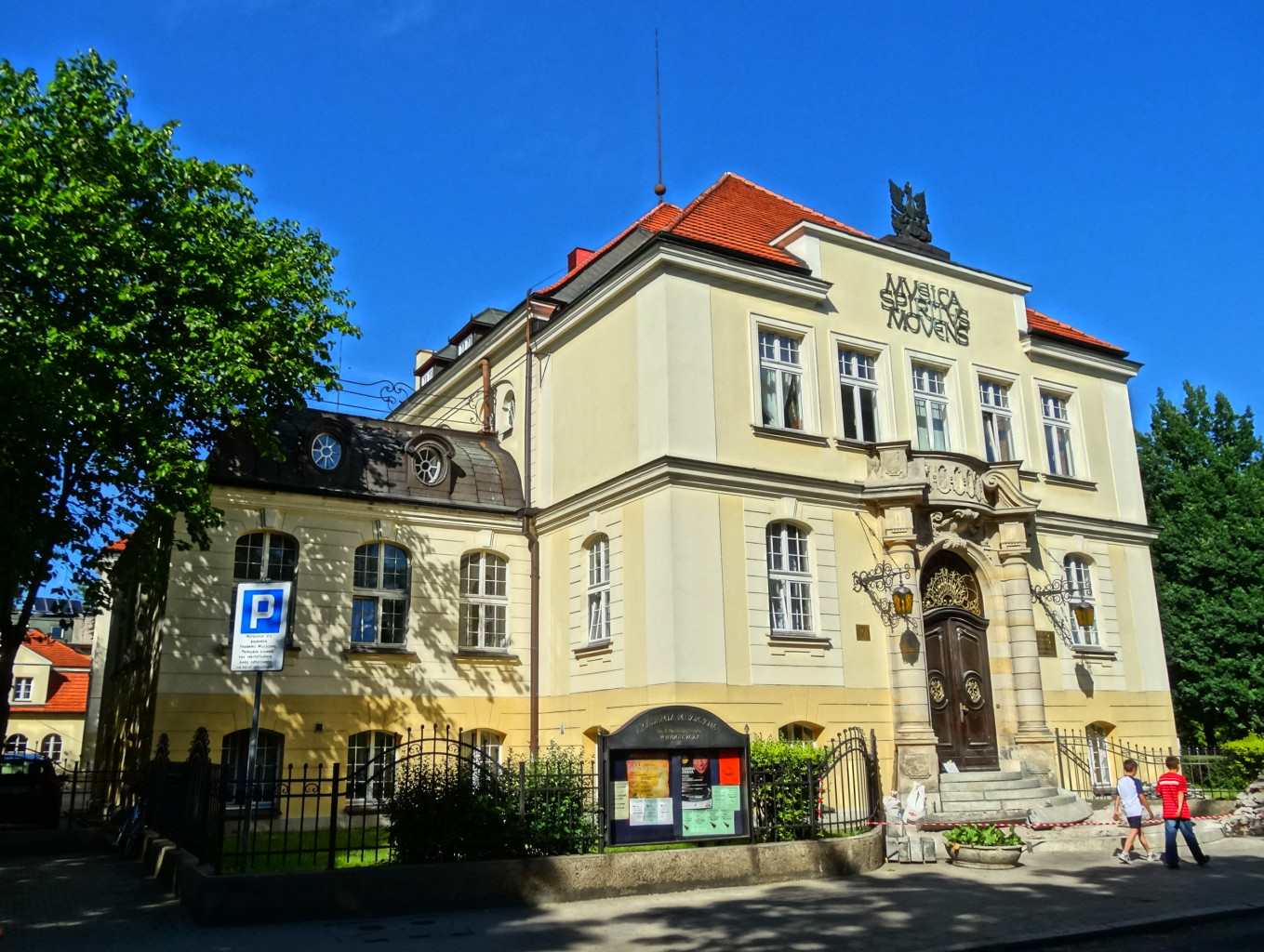
Facade on Słowackiego Street

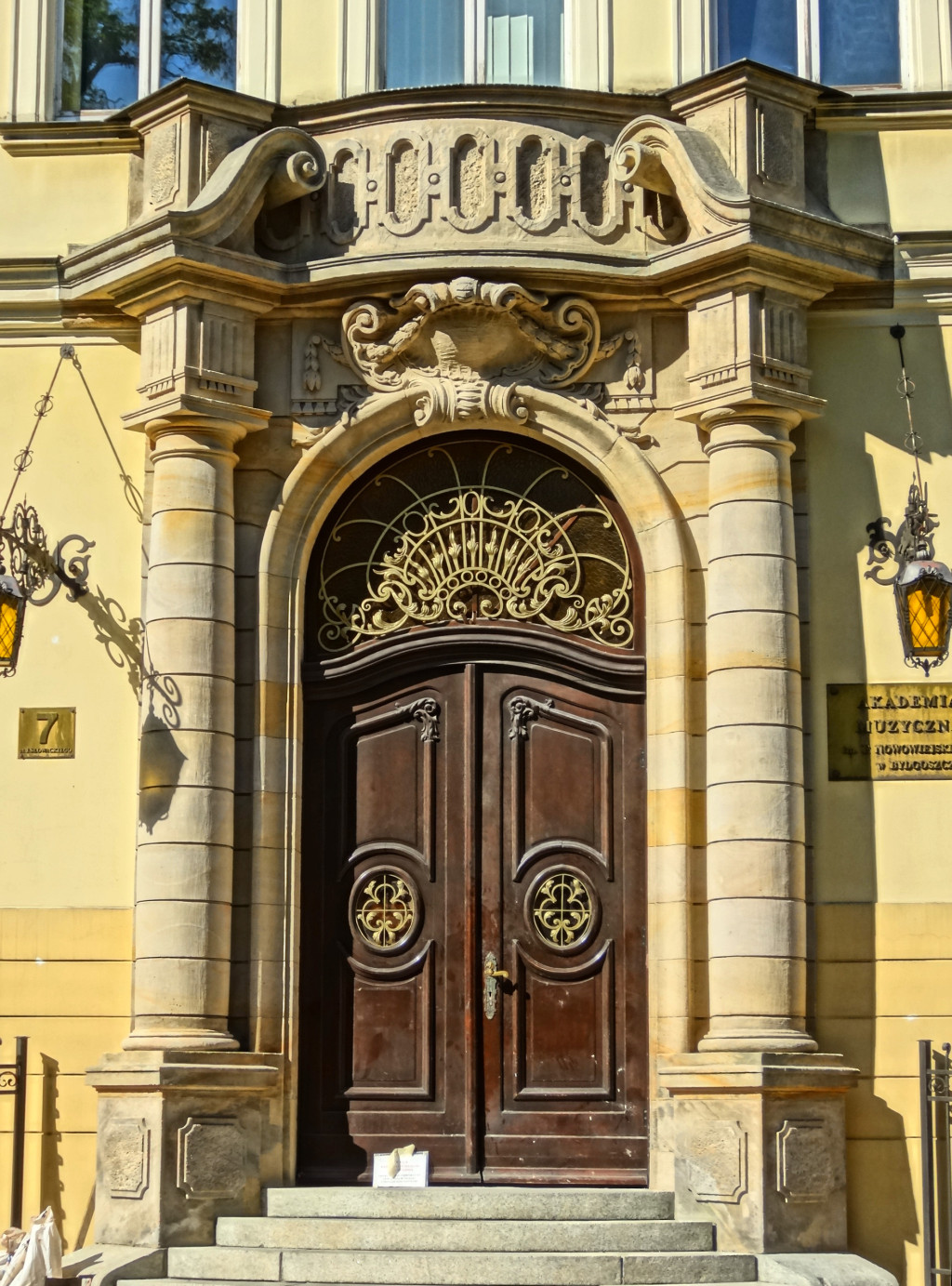
Main portal

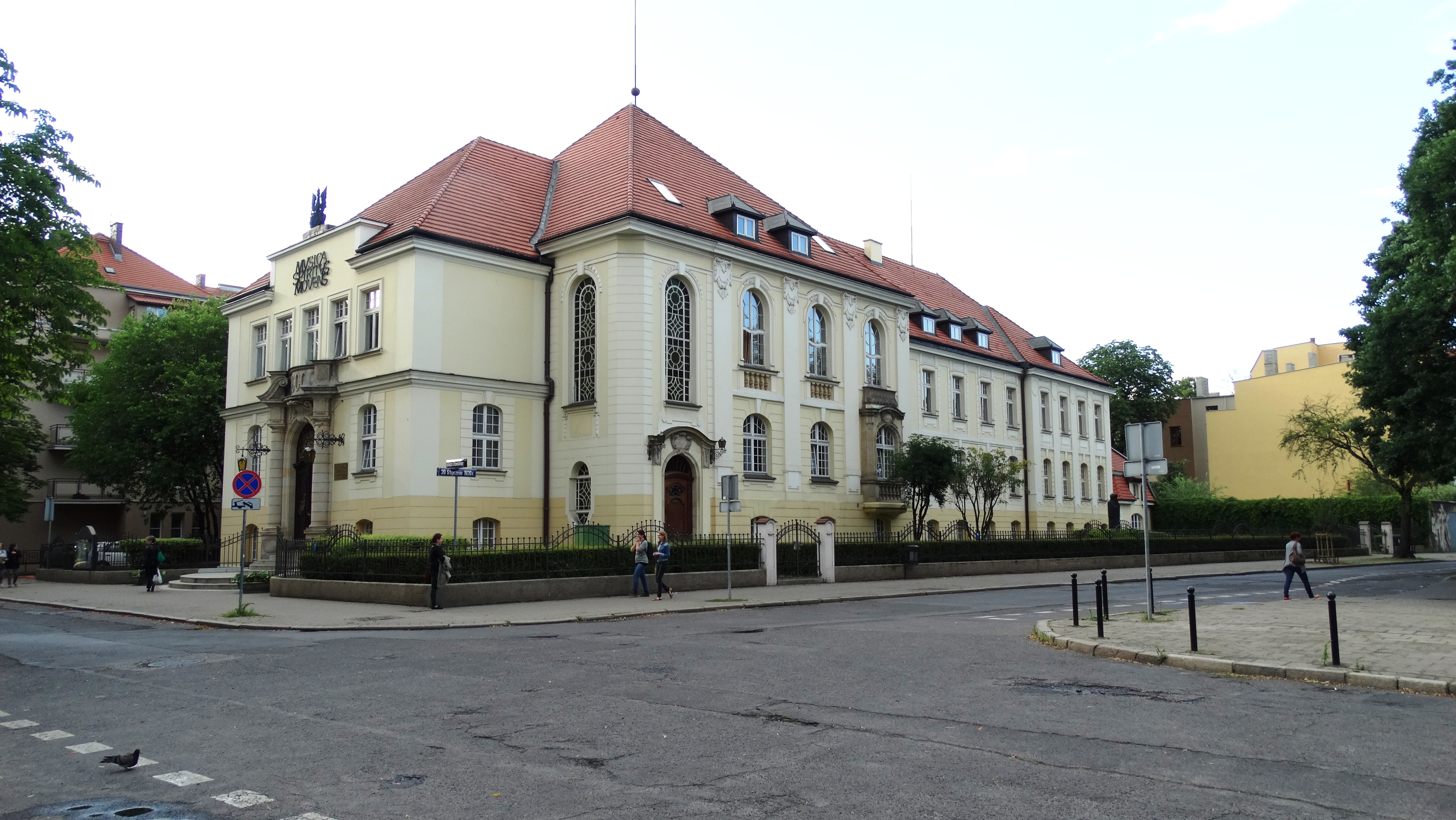
View from the Pomeranian Philharmonic building

=== Other points of interest ===
- Son et lumière fountain

On the front square of the Philharmonic has been built in the 1970s a pipe organ-shaped fountain. The plot is surrounded by the Pomeranian Philharmonic, the building of the Music Schools Group and Słowackiego Street. The fountain was entirely rebuilt in 2014 and unveiled on 23 May. Works have been sponsored by the philanthropy of the Municipal Water Supply and Sewerage Company and European Union funds. From April to October, 3 days per week in the evening (2130–2200), the fountain shows an artistic performance combining games of water, light and music during a 25-minute session. Many famous pieces of classical music are performed in this way (from Tchaikovsky, Beethoven or Johann Strauss I).

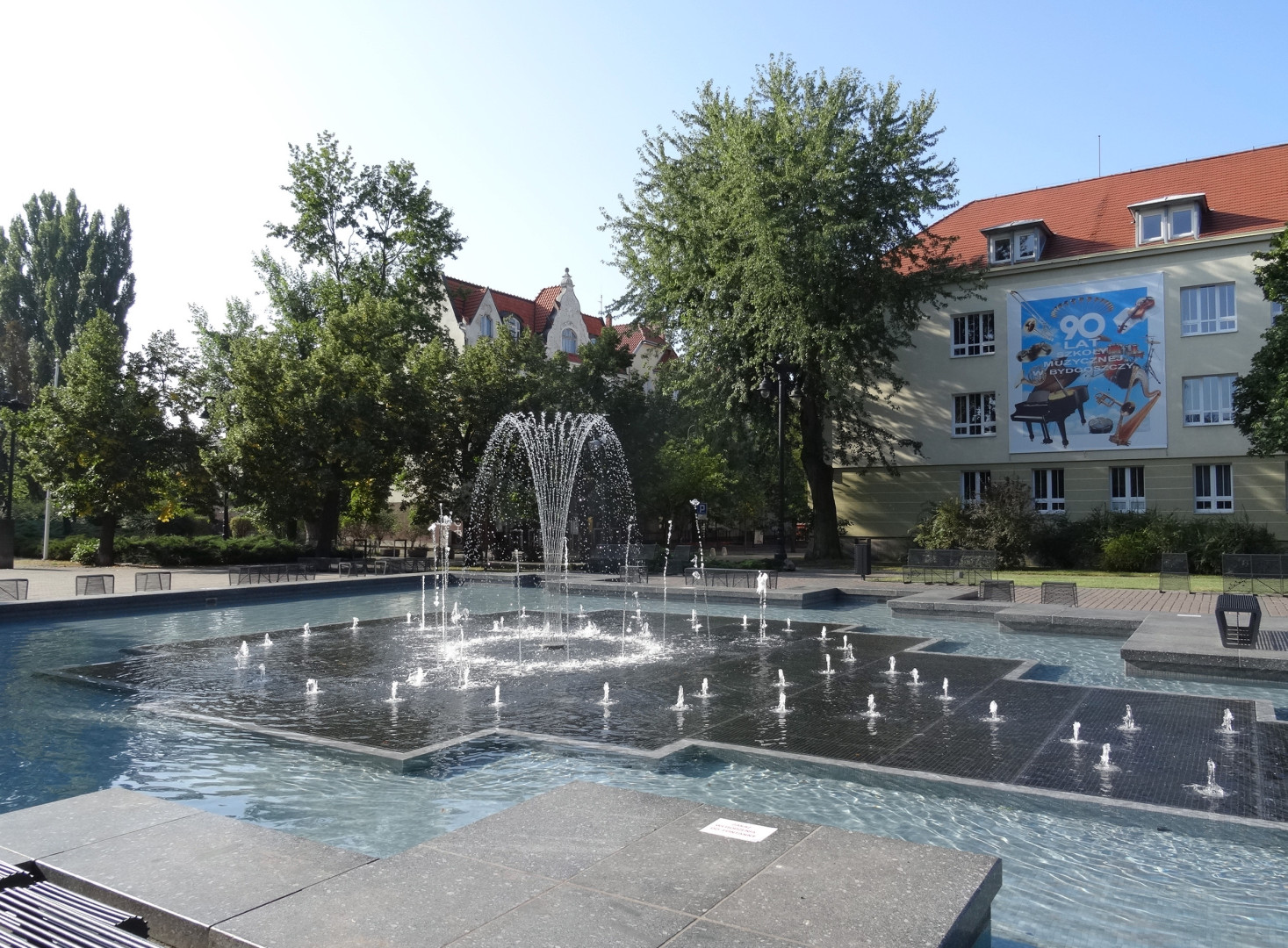
Fountain by day

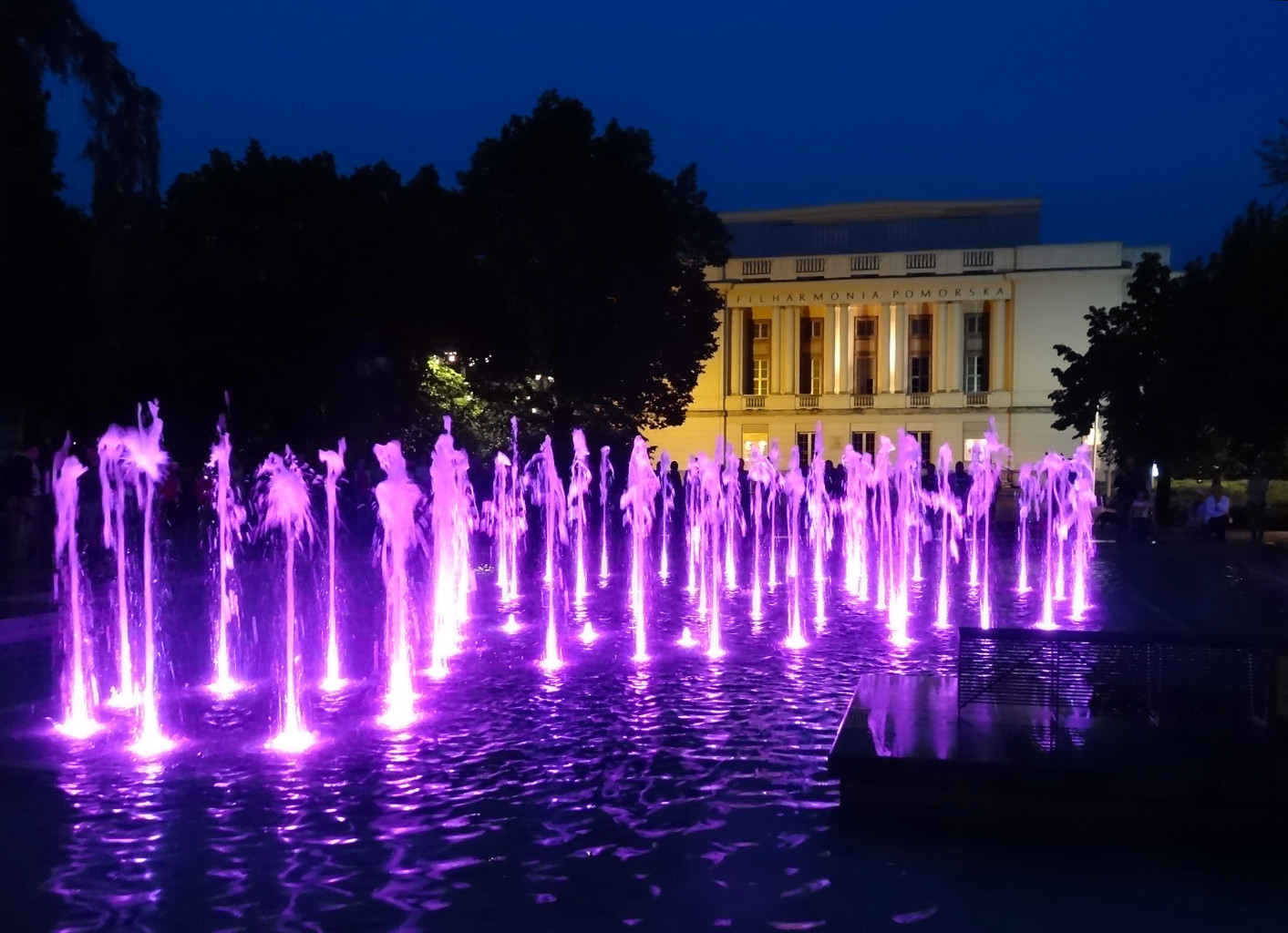
During a performance

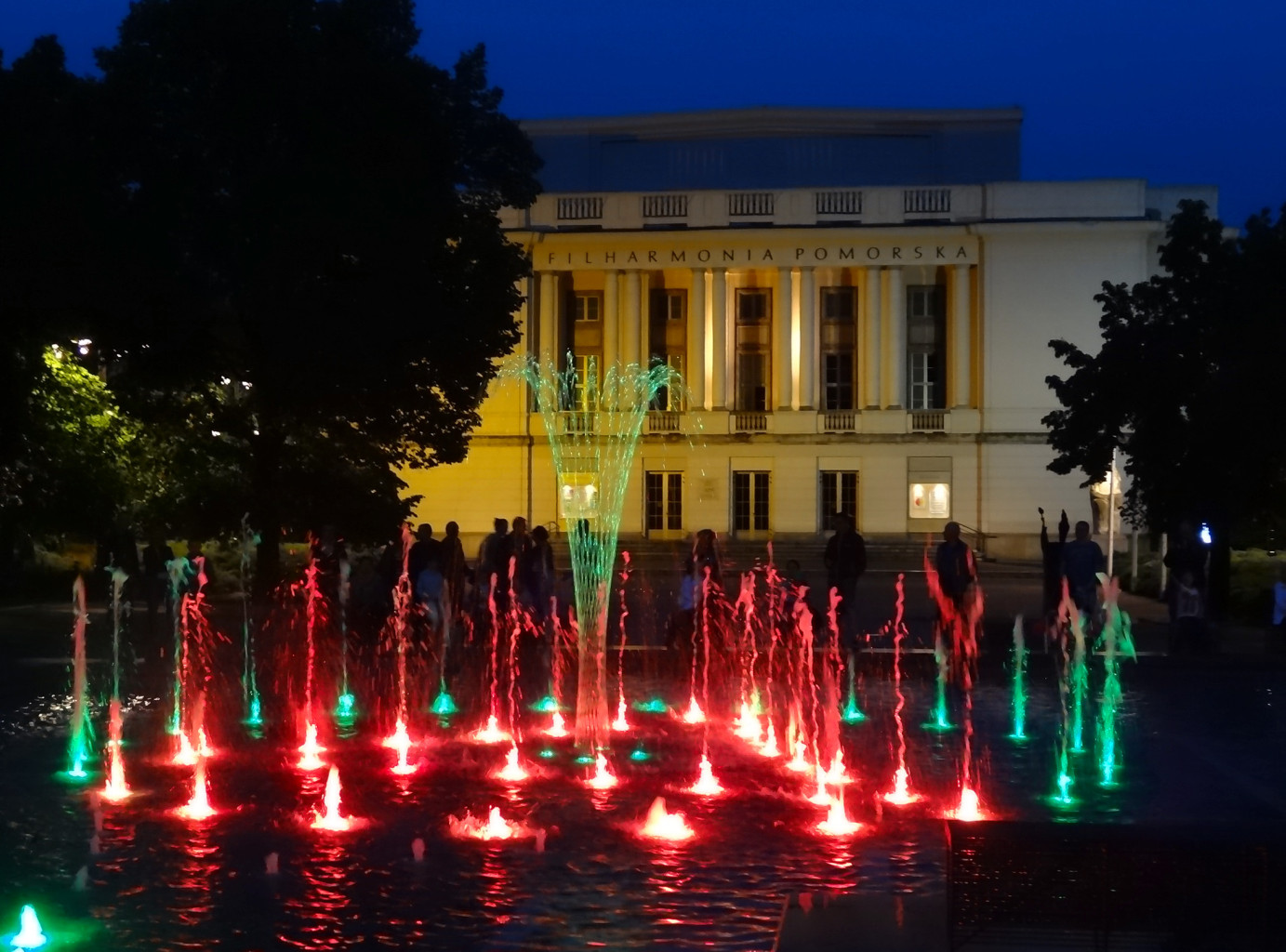
Night performance
- Sculpted tree

This sculpture by Zbyszko Piwoński, unveiled on 15 September 2010, was commissioned by the City Council. Realized in a dead chestnut tree, it is called Let's Play (Polish: Zaraz Zagramy), and invites to visit the musical area. One can notice, among others, sculptures of viola, double bass and other instruments. It is the third tree-sculpture sponsored by the municipal authorities in the area, together with those at Adam Mickiewicz Alley and Gdańska Street.

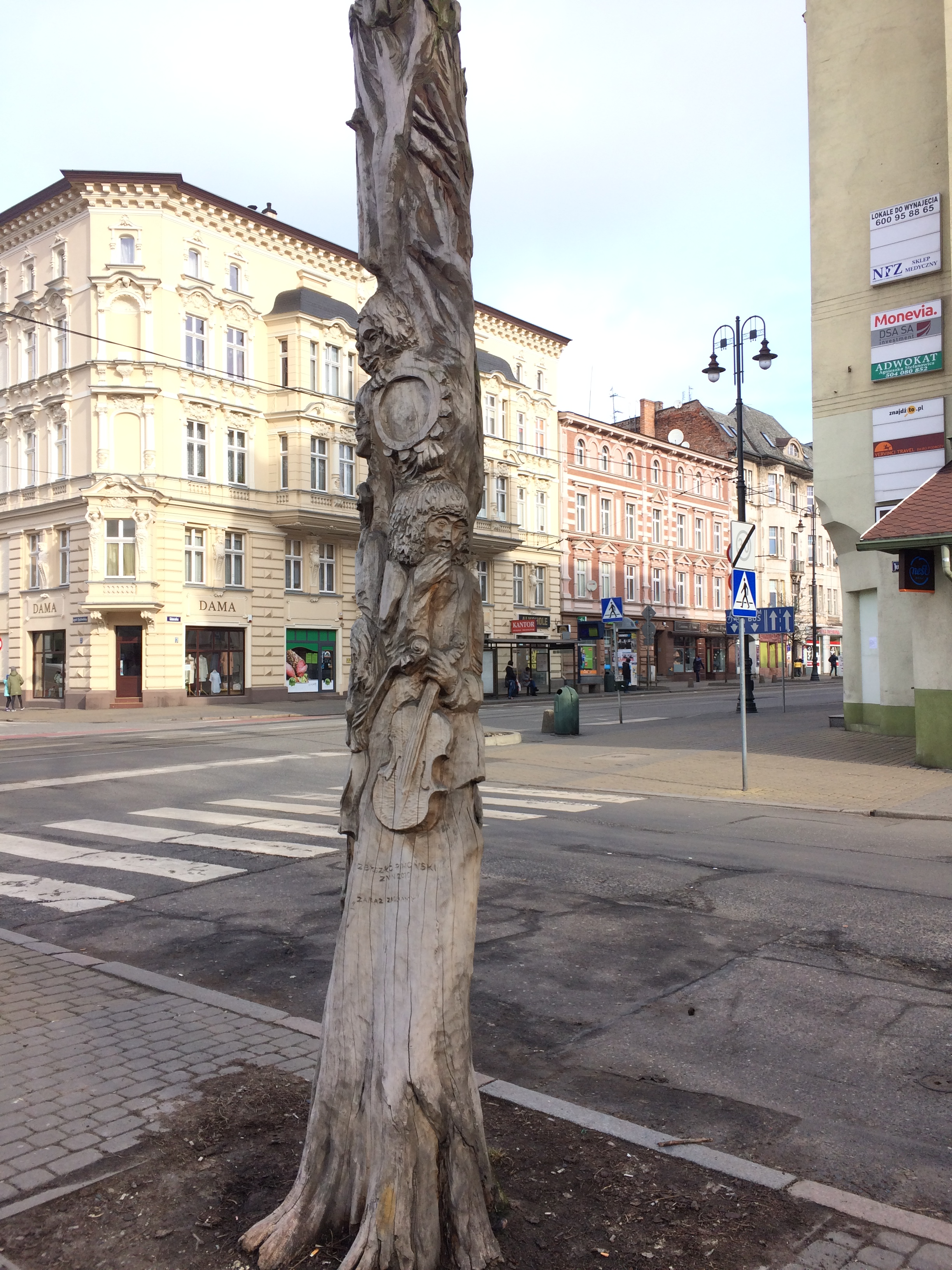
Zaraz Zagramy

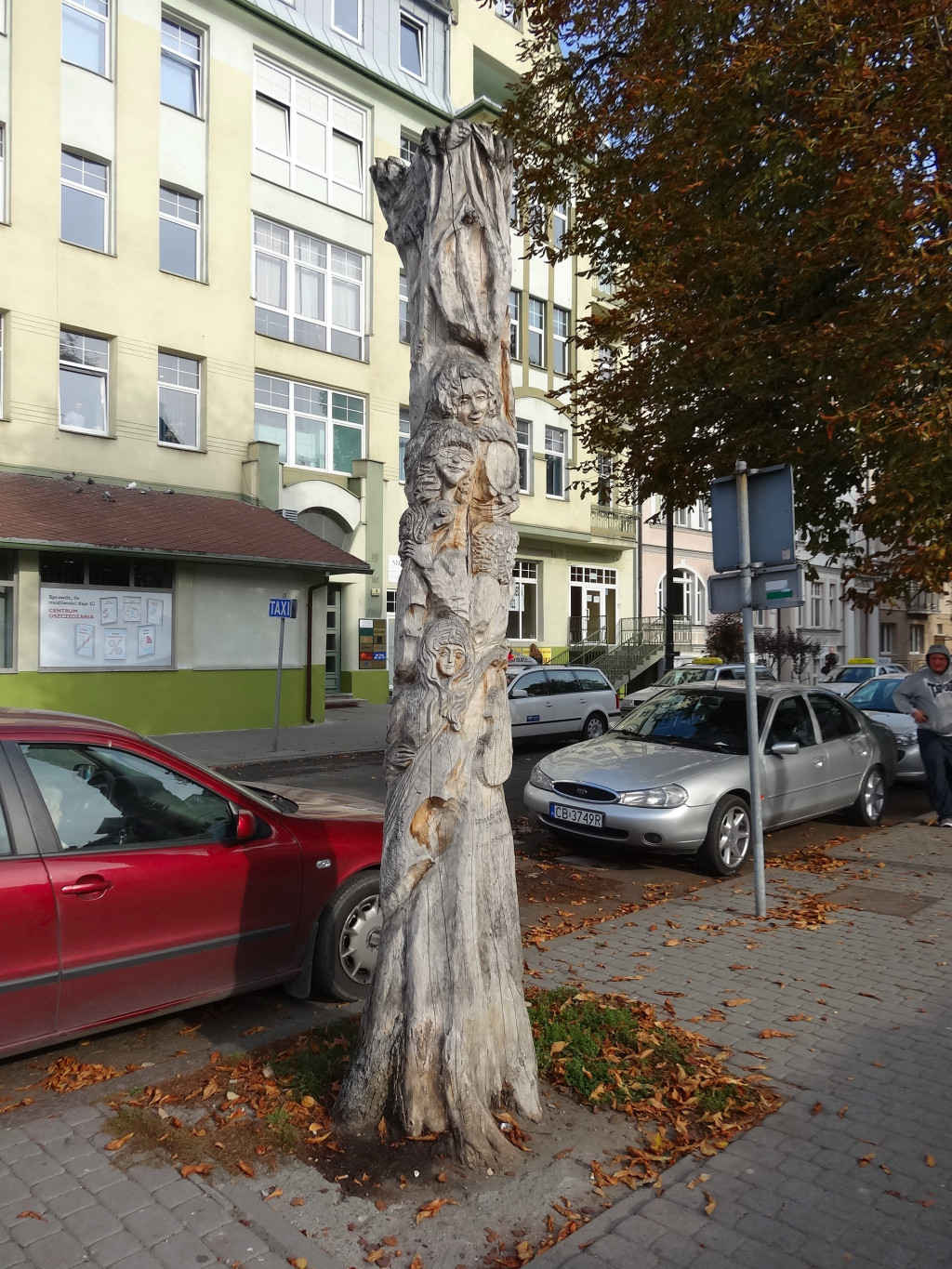
Zaraz Zagramy

== See also ==
- Bydgoszcz
- Bydgoszcz Architects (1850-1970s)
- Fritz Weidner
- Pomeranian Philharmonic
