= Gdańsk Street 33, Bydgoszcz =

Tenement at 33 Gdańska street
- Polish: Kamienica Gdańska 33 w Bydgoszczy
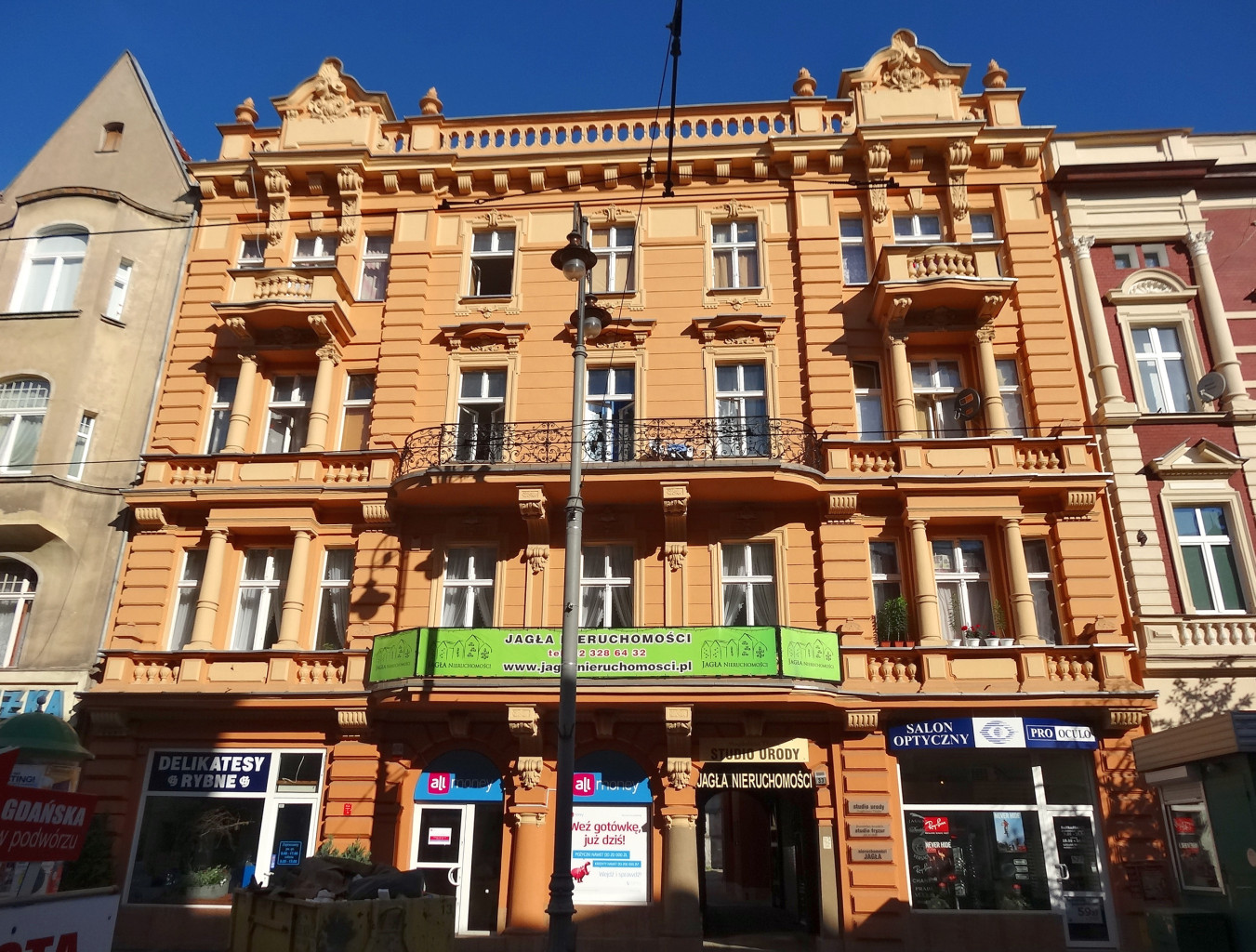
- View from Gdańska street
- Interactive map of the Tenement at 33 Gdańska street area

General information
- Type: Tenement
- Architectural style: Eclecticism & Neo-Baroque
- Classification: Nr.601300-Reg.A/742, 15 January 1986
- Location: 33 Gdańska street, Bydgoszcz, Poland, Poland
- Coordinates: 53°7′40″N 18°0′17″E
- Construction started: 1876
- Completed: 1878

Technical details
- Floor count: 4

The Tenement at 33 Gdańska Street is a historical house in downtown Bydgoszcz, Poland.

== Location ==
The building stands on the west side of Gdańska Street, between Freedom Square and Śniadeckich street.

== History ==
Few elements can be traced back from the origins of this building.

It was erected in 1876–1878.

On the ground floor, the edifice housed since 1884 a colonial and deli store, run by Johann Creuss.

In 1899, there was a workshop of saddle maker (Sattlemeister) managed by Rudolf and Friss Stephan, producing a variety of leather goods, including saddles, travel trunks and handbags.

From 1902, a flower shop was set up, run by Hedwig Kassler. During prussian period, the house was located at Danzigerstrasse 22.

From 1909 on, a pastry and coffee shop were established here.

During Polish People's Republic time, a fish monger established here since 1962, until 2013.

In the building lived Dr. Witold Bełza (1886–1933), librarian, publicist, and cultural activist of Bydgoszcz in the 1920s:

- initiator of the Association of friends of Bydgoszcz City (Polish: Towarzystwo Miłośników Miasta Bydgoszczy), today located at Jezuicka Street 4 (1923);
- first director of the Provincial and Municipal Public Library in Bydgoszcz (1920-1939 and 1945–1952).

== Architecture ==
The house was built in the years 1876–1878 in the style of Eclecticism, using forms of Neo-baroque.

In this way, it mirrors the tenement that almost faces it, on the corner with Freedom Square, even though the latter has been built came 20 years earlier.

The edifice is distinguished by two wide balconies with forged railings. Above building cornices, bay windows are topped by gables. Inside, some elements are still preserved, such as original furnishings, including an antique stove.

The building has been put on the Kuyavian-Pomeranian Voivodeship Heritage List, Nr.601300 Reg.A/742, on January 15, 1986.

== Gallery ==
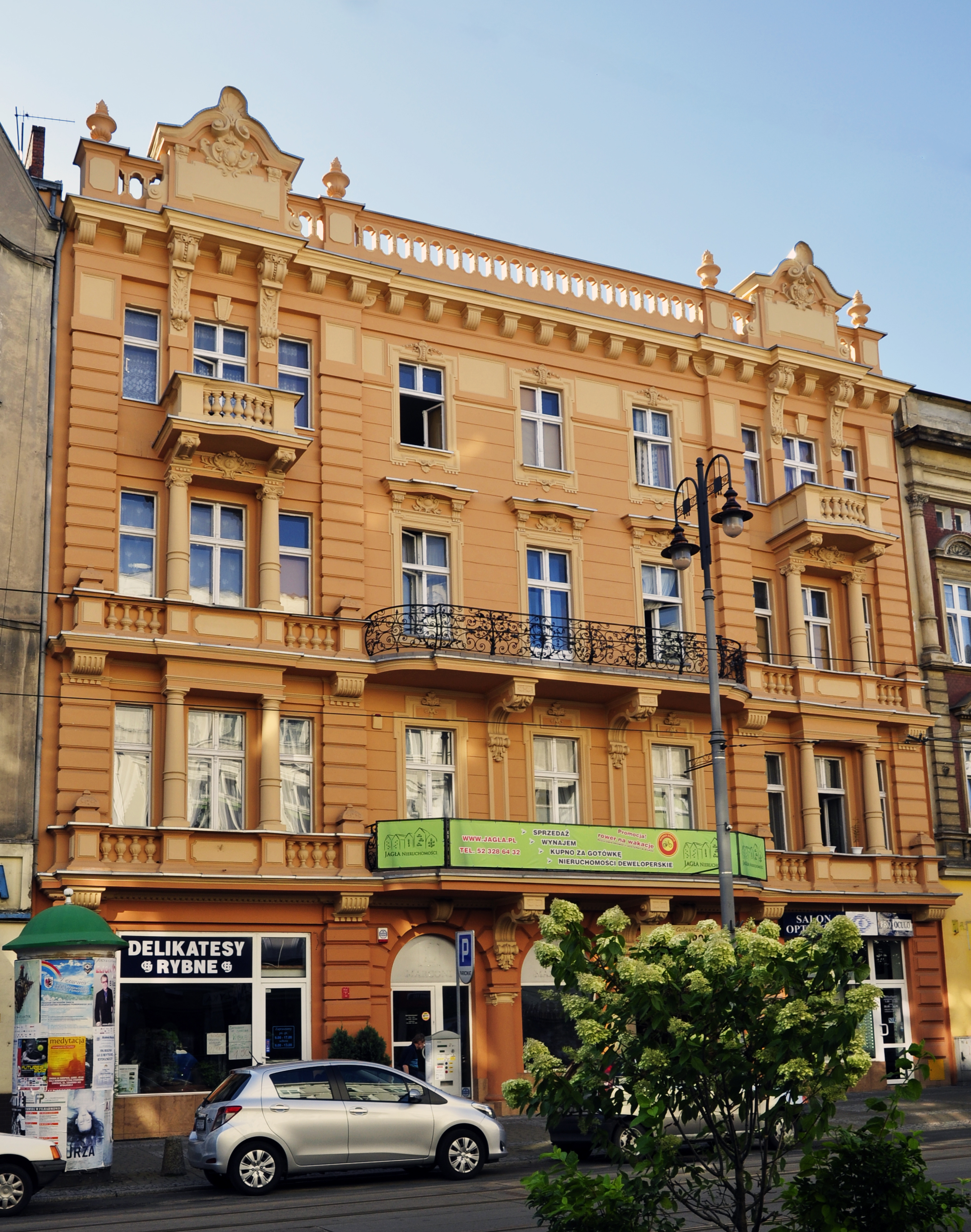
View on forged railings balconies

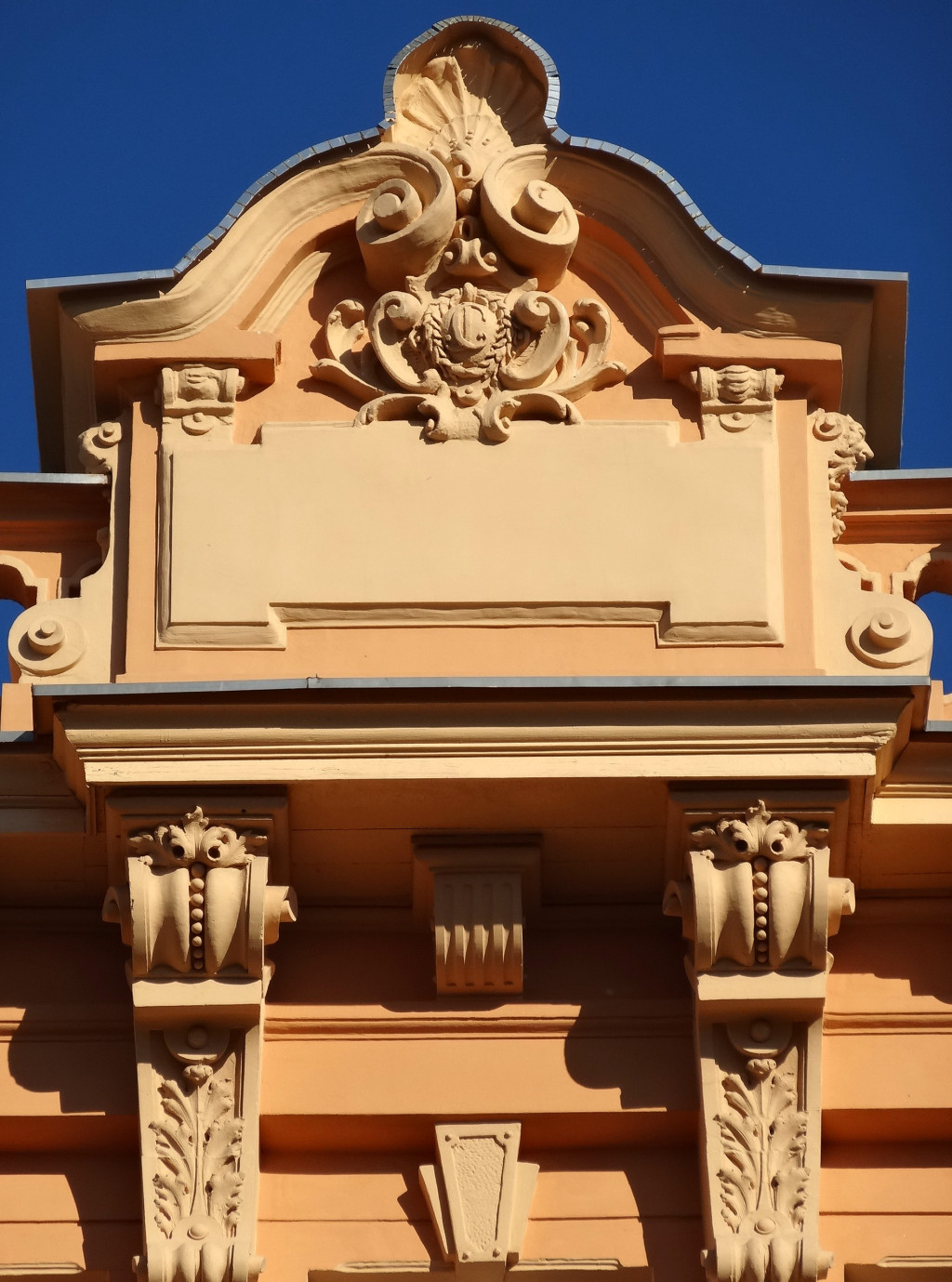
Top adorned gable

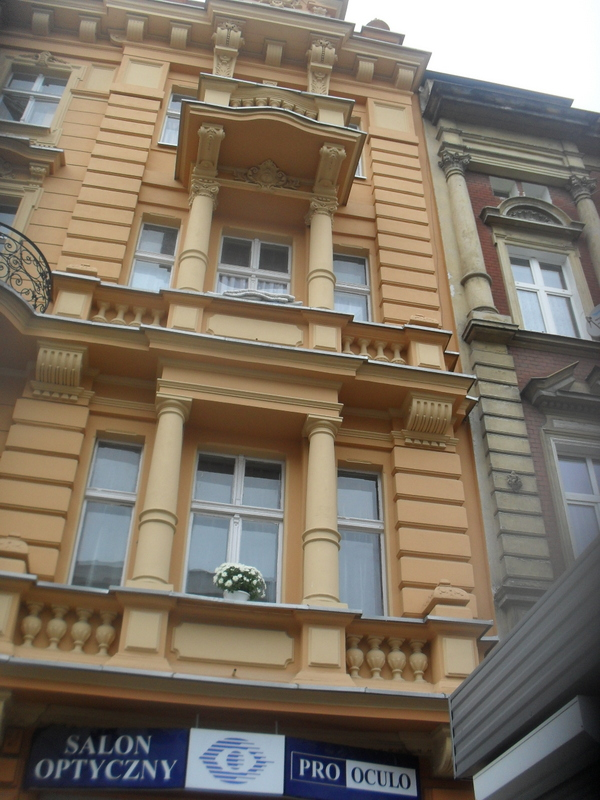
Bay windows with balustrade

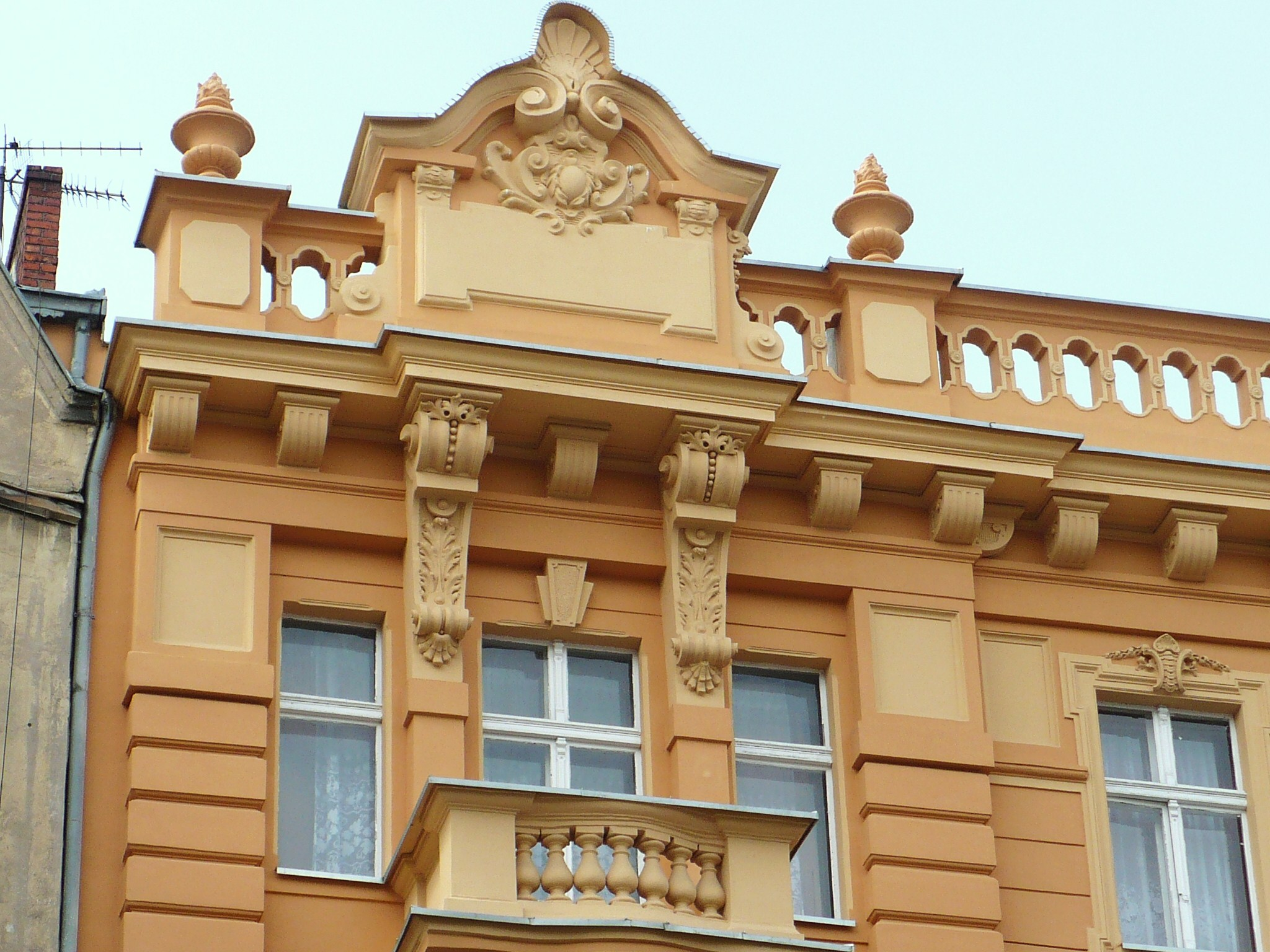
Roof is topped with balustrade

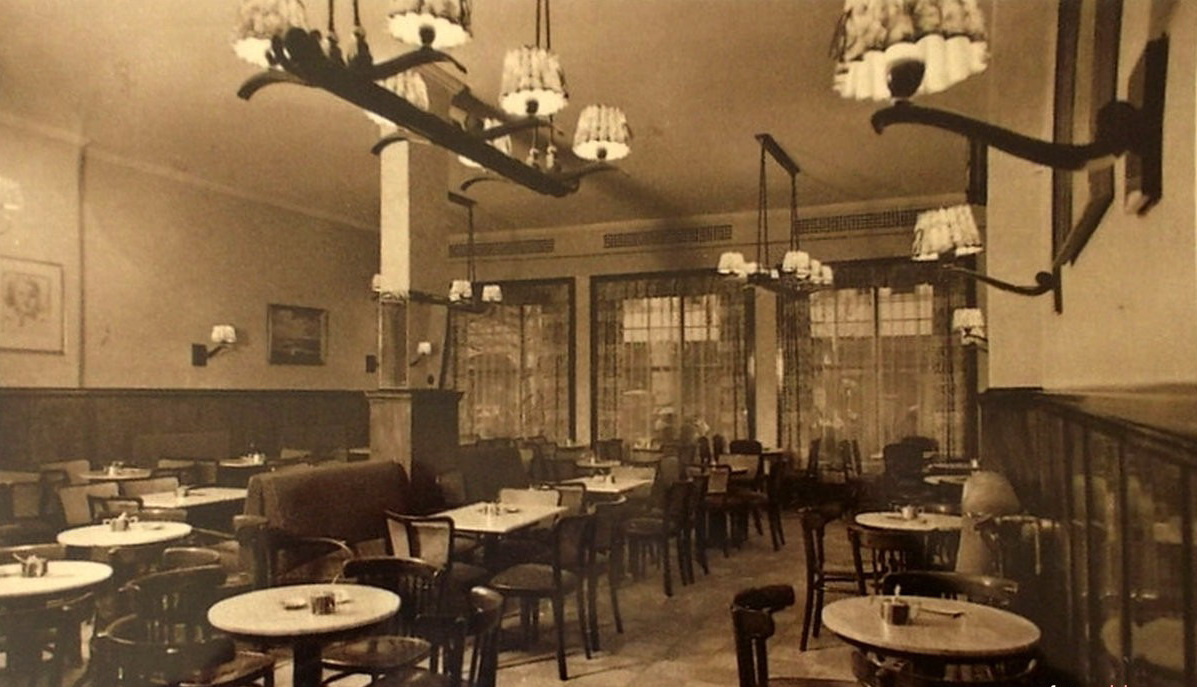
Coffee shop at Nr.33 in the 1940s

== See also ==
- Bydgoszcz
- Gdanska Street in Bydgoszcz

== Bibliography ==
- (in Polish) Bręczewska-Kulesza Daria, Derkowska-Kostkowska Bogna, Wysocka A. (2003). Ulica Gdańska. Przewodnik historyczny. Bydgoszcz: Wojewódzki Ośrodek Kultury w Bydgoszczy. ISBN 9788386970100.
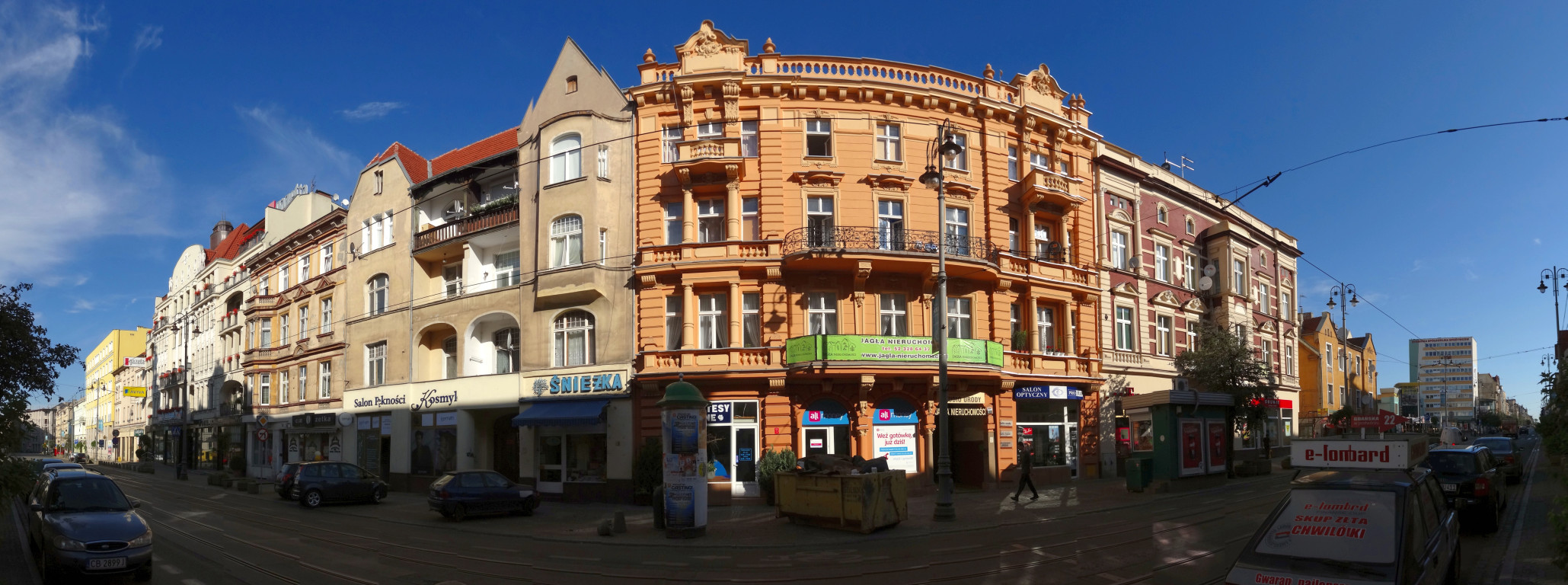
Panorama on the building at Gdańska Street33, George Sikorski Tenement on the left
