= Fritz Weidner Tenement =

Fritz Weidner house
- Polish: Kamienica Fritza Weidnera w Bydgoszczy
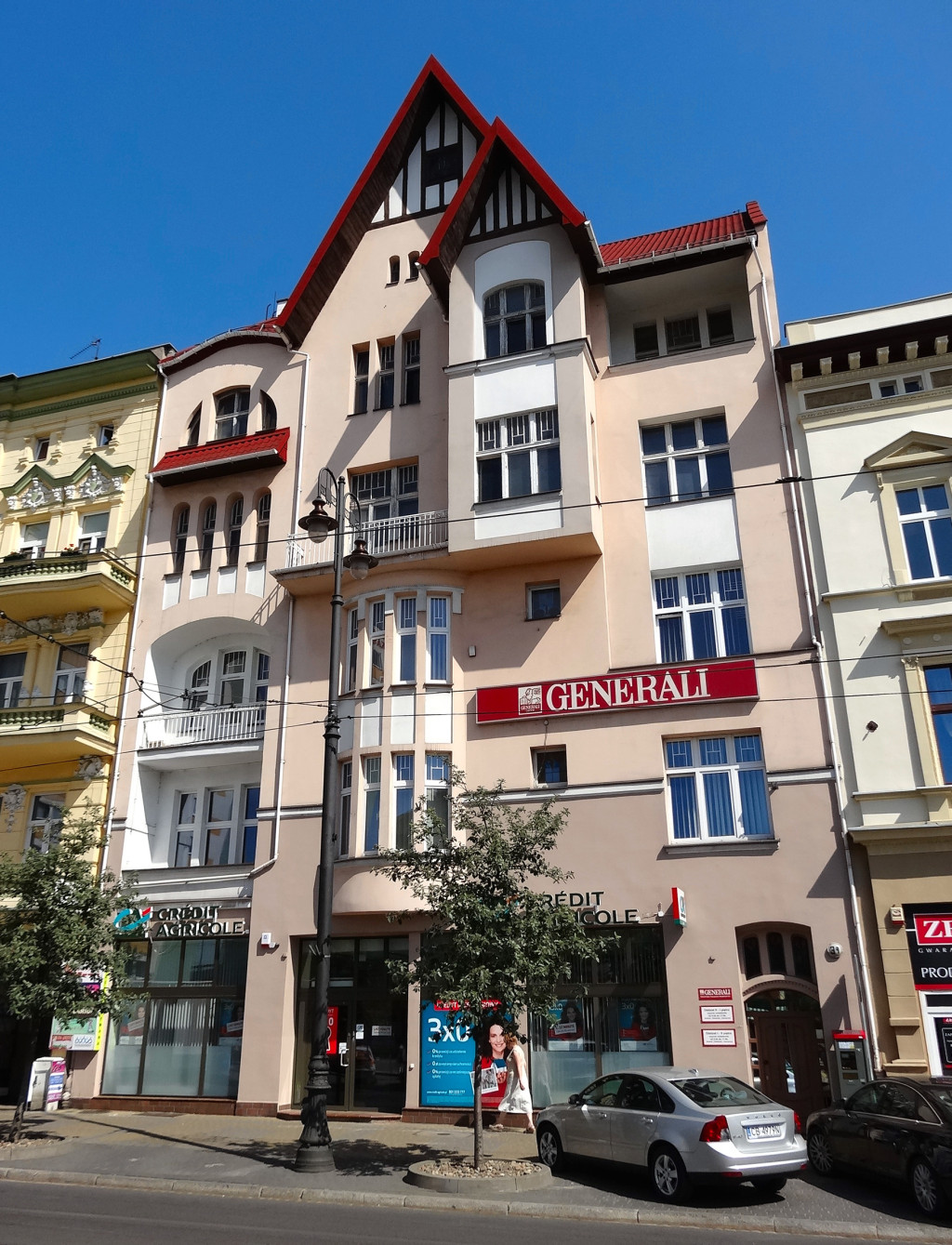
- View from Gdańska street
- Interactive map of the Fritz Weidner house area

General information
- Type: Tenement
- Architectural style: German historicism
- Location: 34 Gdańska street, Bydgoszcz, Poland, Poland
- Coordinates: 53°7′43″N 18°0′23″E
- Completed: 1906

Technical details
- Floor count: 5

Design and construction
- Architect: Fritz Weidner

Fritz Weidner house is a historical tenement located in downtown Bydgoszcz.

== Location ==
The building stands on the eastern side of Gdańska Street at Nr.34, between Krasiński and Słowackiego streets.

== History ==
The house was built in 1906 for a master painter, Walther Minge on the site of an earlier building. The address at that time was "Danzigerstrasse 151/152". In the house previously standing on the premises lived from 1893 to 1895 Anton Hoffmann, a Bydgoszcz architect, stepfather of the famous local builder Józef Święcicki.

Designer Fritz Weidner was a German builder who came to Bydgoszcz at the end of the 19th century and had a frantic building activity in the city between 1896 and 1914. He lived in this tenement he built from 1912 onwards.

In this building has been located the first movie theater in Bydgoszcz, opened on October 10, 1908, by a 30-year-old Pole, Waclaw Szkaradkiewicz.

In the same area, Fritz Weidner built houses at the following addresses:

- Mix Ernst tenement and movie theatre at 10 Gdańska Street (1905);
- Thomas Frankowski Tenement at 28 Gdańska Street (1897);
- George Sikorski Tenement at 31 Gdańska Street (1906);
- Max Rosental Tenement at 42 Gdańska Street (1905);
- Ernst Bartsch tenement at 79 Gdańska Street (1898);
- Tenement at 3 Plac Wolności (1903).

He also took part in the design of:

- first reinforced concrete building in Bydgoszcz, designed by Berlin architect Otto Walther at 15 Gdańska street;
- Department Store Brandt (now Bank PKO SA) at 4 Theatre square.

Before WWI, the building housed the seat of Windschild and Langelott, a construction company which re-built in 1912-1913 the Queen Jadwiga bridge, allowing the Królowej Jadwigi Street to cross the Brda river.

In the 1920s, a photographic workshop was located there, run by Emil Wehram.

During interwar period, the address was 152 Ulica Gdańska: a car dealership company Zagorski & Ska was housed there.

== Architecture ==
The building presents the form of German Historicism, characteristic for projects Fritz Weidner. This style also became popular as "Landhaus Stil", and quickly appeared in the streets of Bydgoszcz. The first implementation of this architecture was realized in 1906 with the present building.

The edifice has an asymmetrical façade, with vertical loggias, bay windows and tall, triangular gables with wattle and daub structure. The architectural style of the building refers to the early modernism, where the stucco decoration is reduced to a minimum, while the most important measure is the artistic arrangement of architectural elements that make up the facade.

== Gallery ==
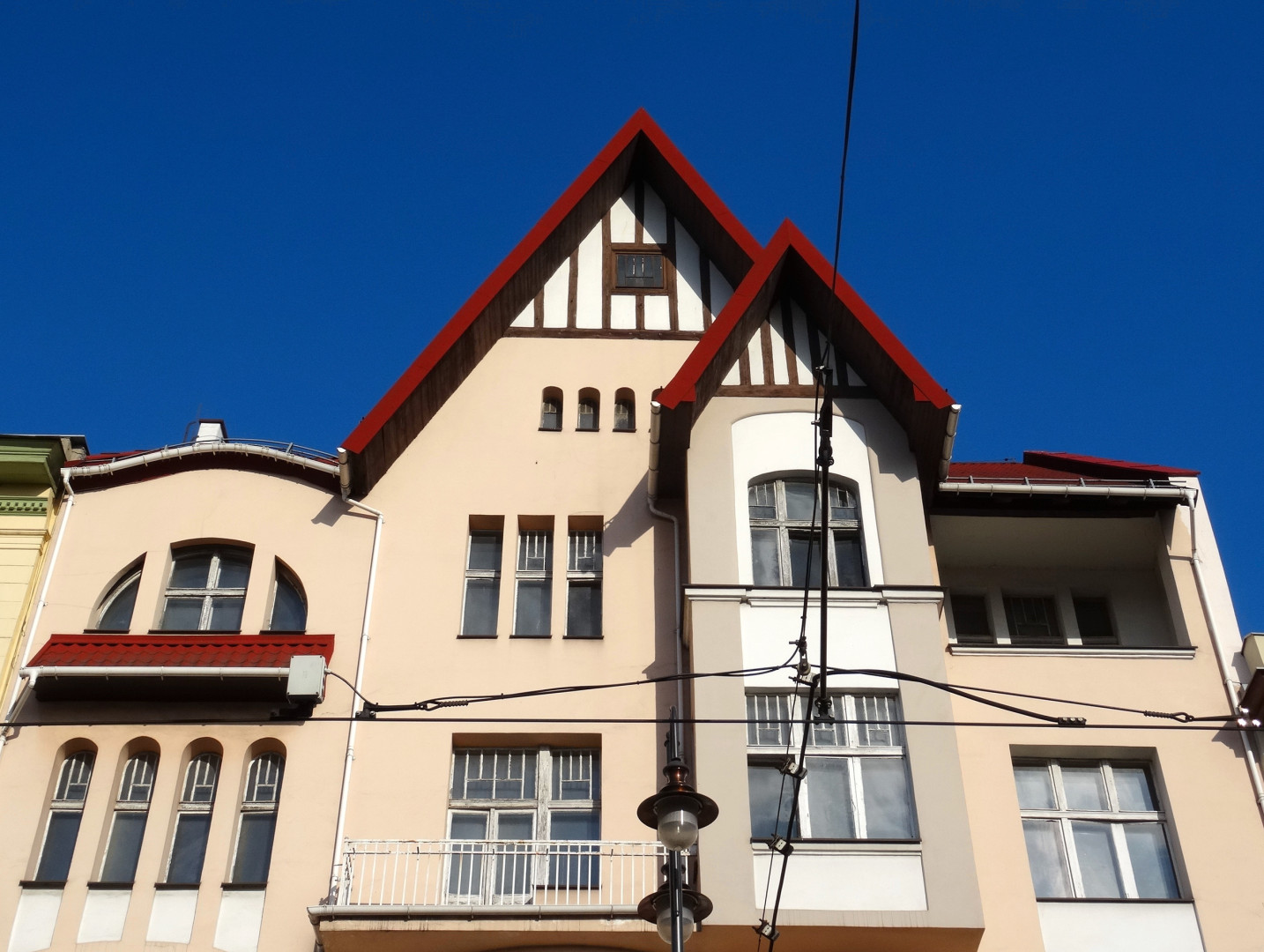
Detail of the gable

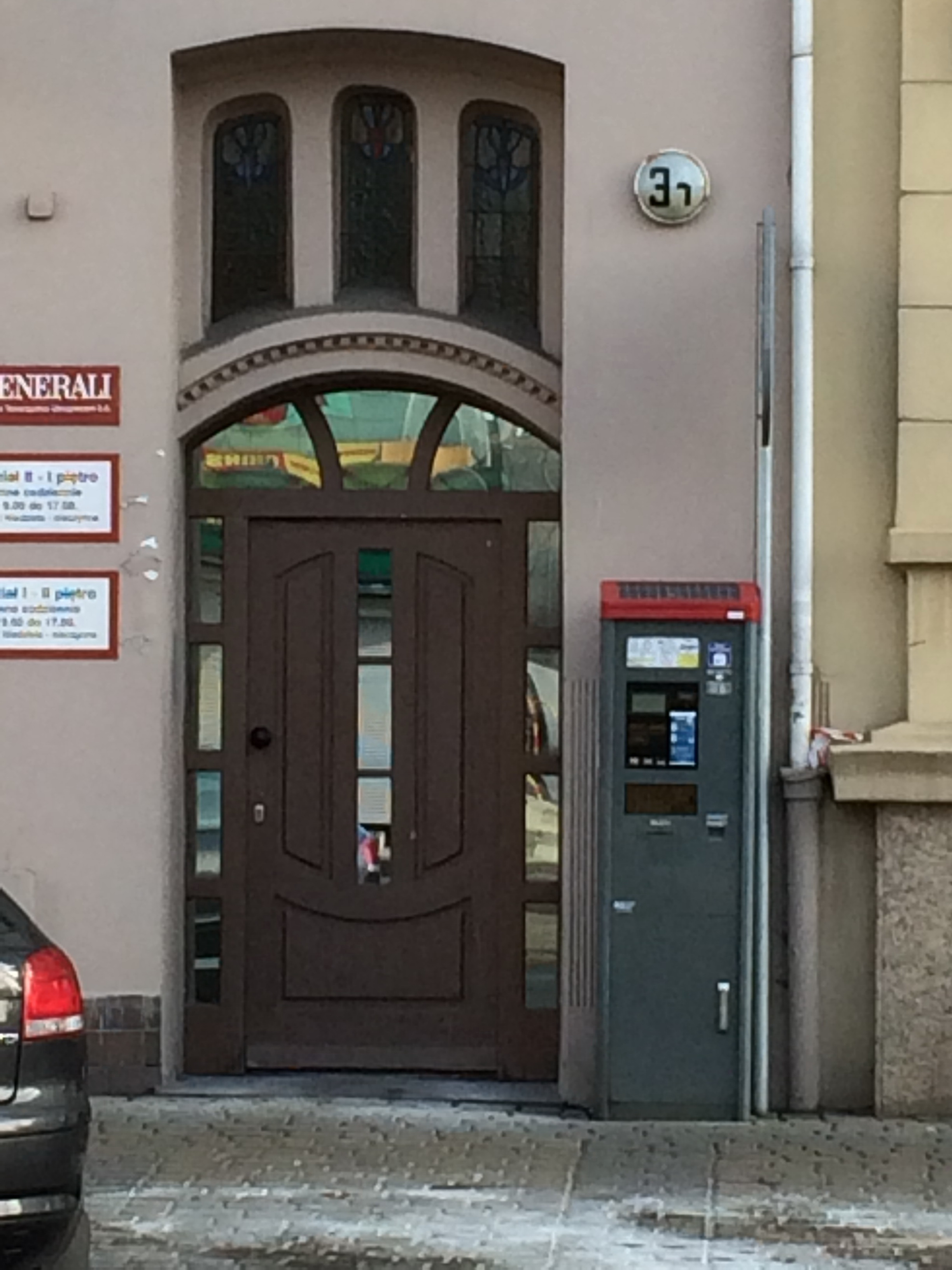
Gate detail

== See also ==
- Bydgoszcz
- Gdanska Street in Bydgoszcz
- Freedom Square, Bydgoszcz
- Jan and Jędrzej Śniadecki Street in Bydgoszcz
- Fritz Weidner

== Bibliography ==
- (in Polish) Bręczewska-Kulesza, Daria. Wpływ architektury i architektów berlińskich na bydgoskie budownictwo mieszkaniowe na przełomie XIX i XX stulecia. Bydgoszcz.
- (in Polish) Bręczewska-Kulesza Daria, Derkowska-Kostkowska Bogna, Wysocka A. (2003). Ulica Gdańska. Przewodnik historyczny. Bydgoszcz: Wojewódzki Ośrodek Kultury w Bydgoszczy. ISBN 9788386970100.
