= George Sikorski Tenement =

- Polish: Kamienica Georga Sikorskiego w Bydgoszczy
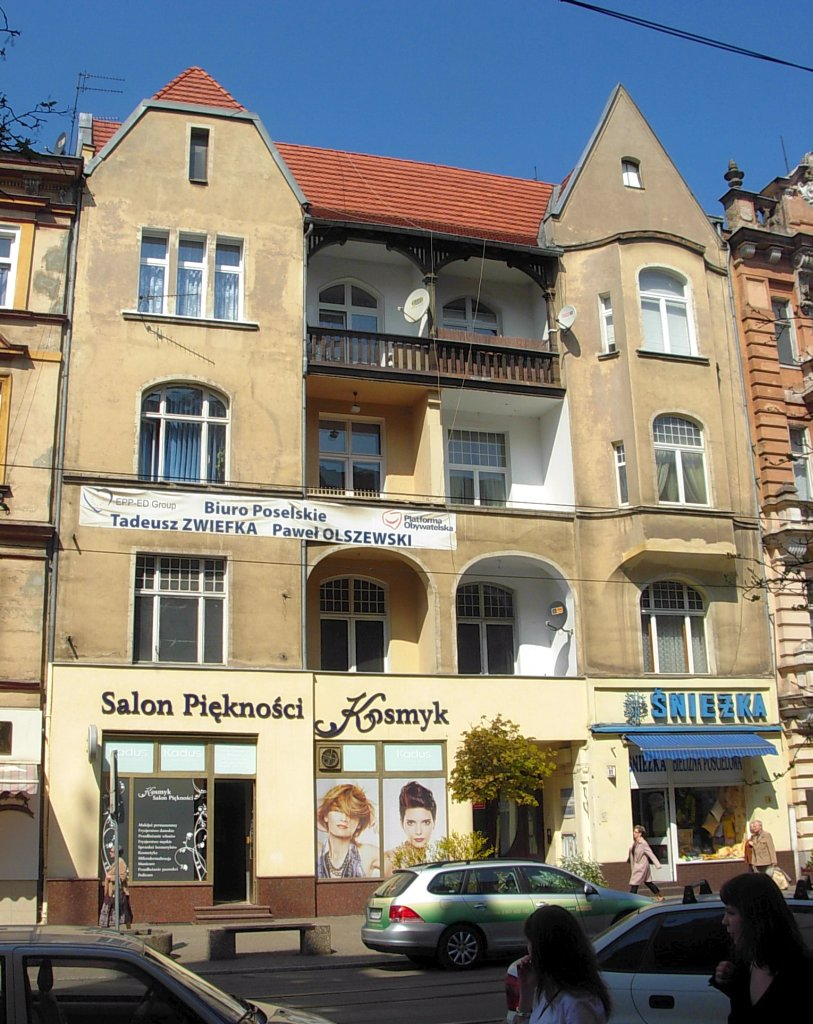
- View from Gdańska street
- Interactive map of the George Sikorski Tenement area

General information
- Type: Tenement
- Architectural style: German Historicism
- Location: 31 Gdańska street, Bydgoszcz, Poland, Poland
- Coordinates: 53°7′39″N 18°0′17″E
- Construction started: 1902
- Completed: 1903
- Client: Georg Sikorski

Technical details
- Floor count: 4

Design and construction
- Architect: Fritz Weidner

The George Sikorski Tenement is a house located at 31 Gdańska Street, between Pomorska and Śniadeckich streets in Bydgoszcz, Poland.

== History ==
The house was built in 1902–1903 for the barber George Sikorski; at this time its address was 20 Danzigerstrasse, Bromberg.

It was designed by the architect Fritz Weidner, a German builder who came to Bydgoszcz at the end of the 19th century. He conducted building activity in the city between 1896 and 1914. From 1912, he lived in the house he built for himself at 34 Gdańska street

In the same area, Fritz Weidner built houses at the following addresses: the Mix Ernst tenement and movie theatre at 10 Gdańska Street(1905), the Thomas Frankowski Tenement at 28 Gdańska Street (1897), the Max Rosental Tenement at 42 Gdańska Street (1905), the Ernst Bartsch tenement at 79 Gdańska Street (1898) and the House at 3 Freedom Square 3 (1903).

During the interwar period, the ground floor housed Edward Kozlowski's jewelry store. At the end of the 1930s, the family Kałamajski moved from building at 27 Gdansk st. to install a dyeing shop, Tint.

== Architecture ==
The building represents the style of picturesque architecture, typical of Fritz Weidner projects. Originally, the south peak building had an adorned façade.

== Gallery ==
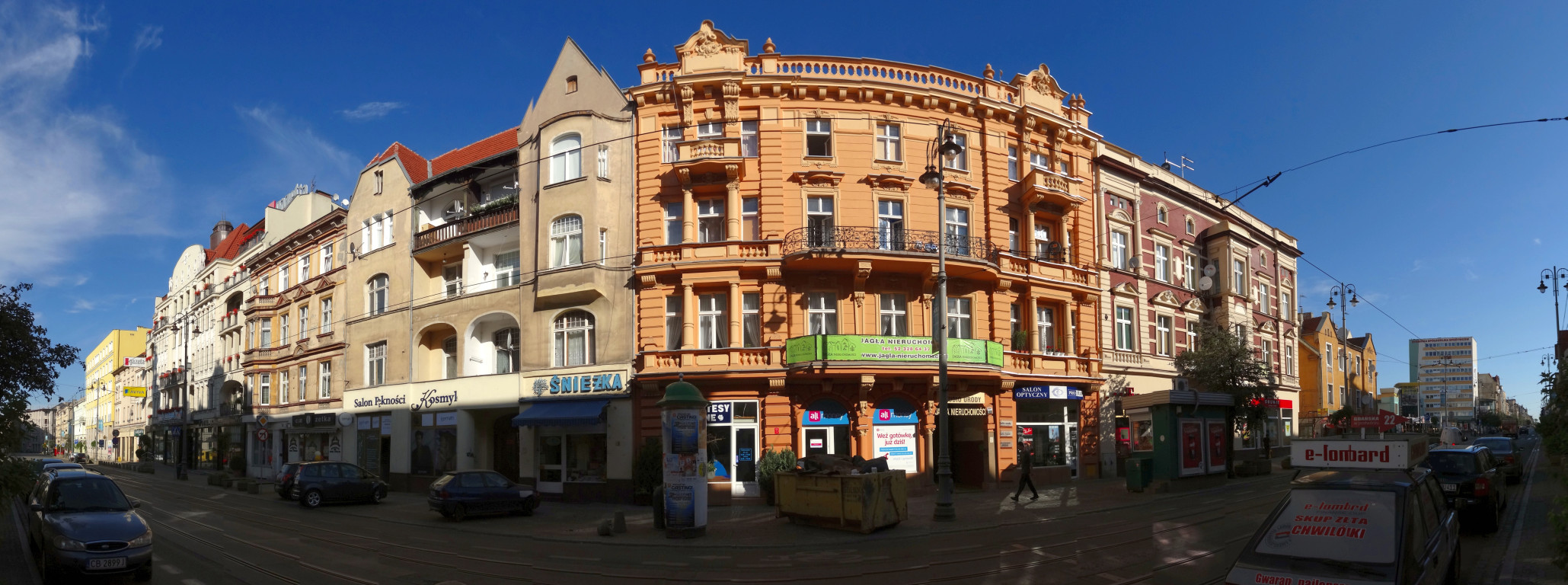
Panorama on the Gdanska Street, George Sikorski Tenement on the left, Nr.33 on the right

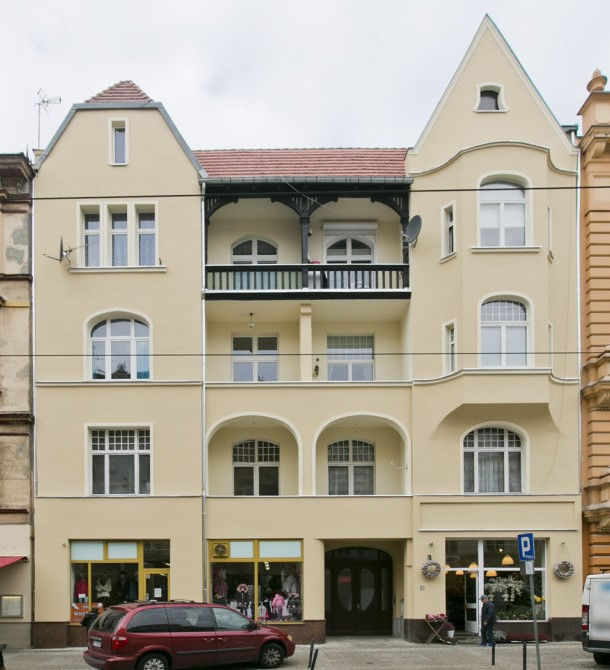
Main elevation

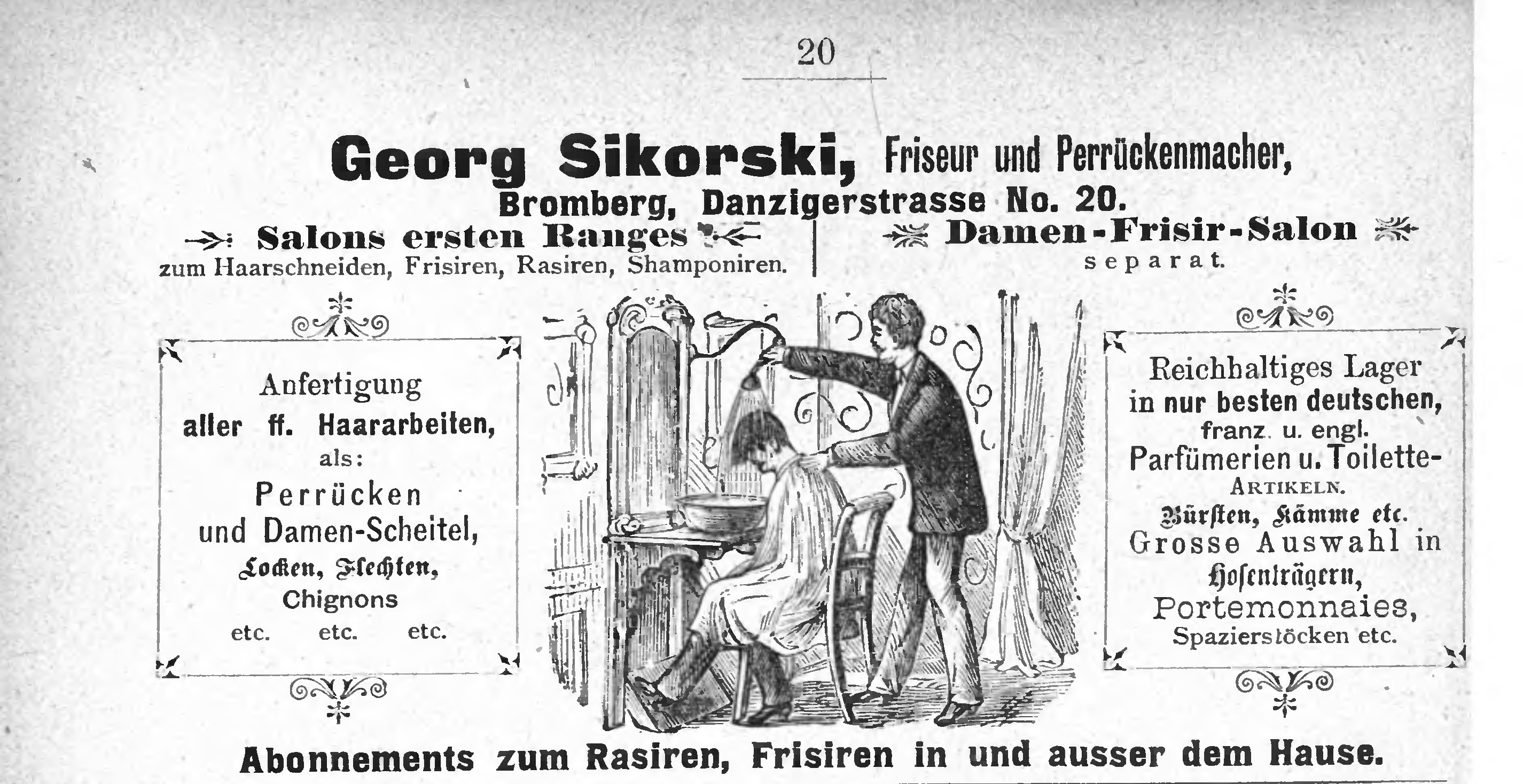
Advertising for G. Sikorski in the 1910s

== See also ==
- Bydgoszcz
- Gdanska Street in Bydgoszcz
- Fritz Weidner
- (in Polish) Downtown district in Bydgoszcz

== Bibliography ==
- (in Polish) Bręczewska-Kulesza Daria, Derkowska-Kostkowska Bogna, Wysocka A. (2003). Ulica Gdańska. Przewodnik historyczny. Bydgoszcz: Wojewódzki Ośrodek Kultury w Bydgoszczy. ISBN 9788386970100.
- (in Polish) Bręczewska-Kulesza, Daria. Wpływ architektury i architektów berlińskich na bydgoskie budownictwo mieszkaniowe na przełomie XIX i XX stulecia. Bydgoszcz.
