= Thomas Frankowski Tenement =

- Polish: Kamienica Thomasa Frankowskiego w Bydgoszczy
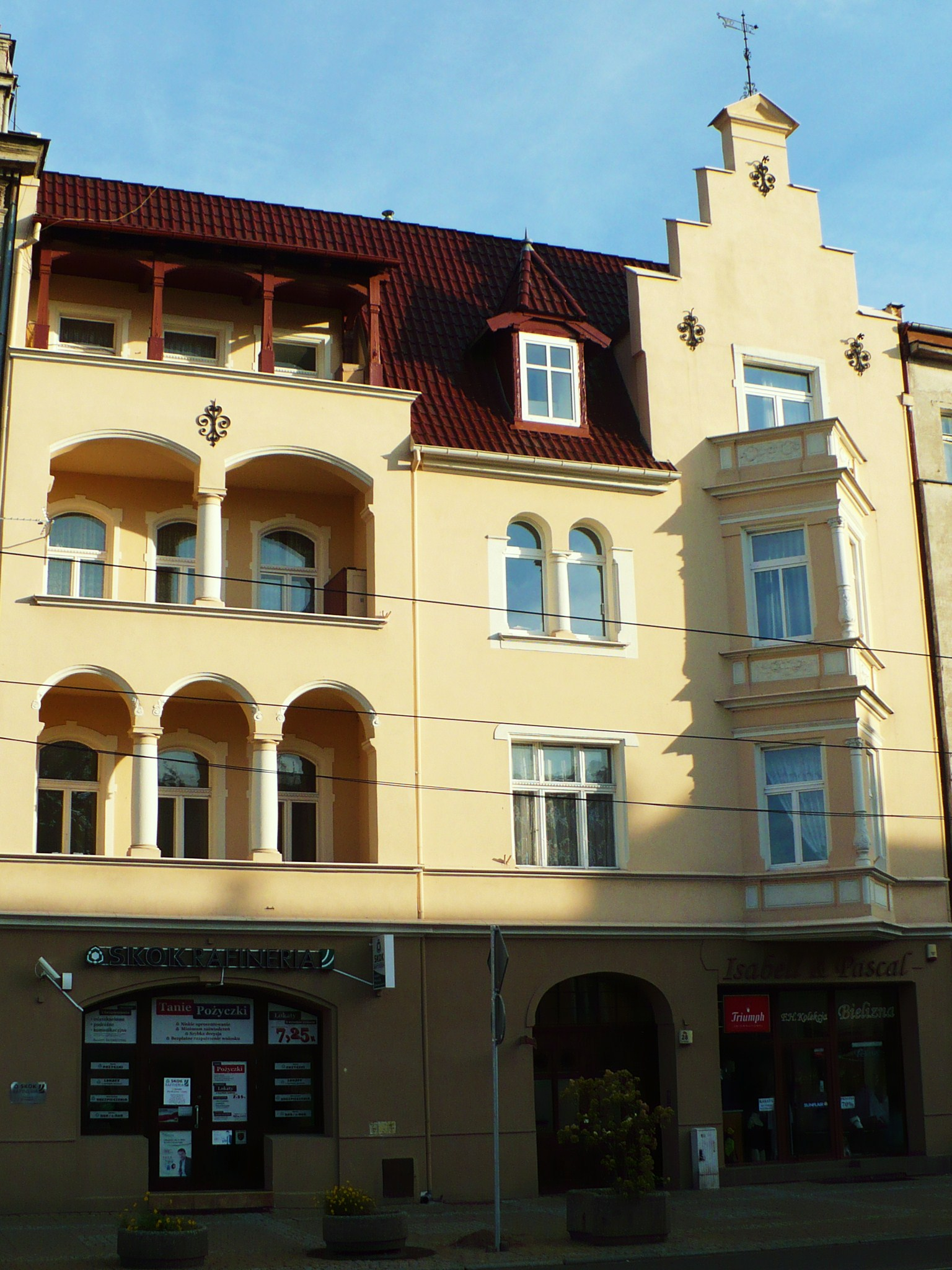
- View from Gdańska street
- Interactive map of the Thomas Frankowski Tenement area

General information
- Type: Tenement
- Architectural style: German Historicism
- Classification: Nr.748678-Reg.A/1582), 16 February 2011.
- Location: 28 Gdańska Street, Bydgoszcz, Poland, Poland
- Coordinates: 53°7′42″N 18°0′22″E
- Construction started: 1897
- Completed: 1898
- Client: Thomas Frankowski

Technical details
- Floor count: 4

Design and construction
- Architect: Fritz Weidner

Thomas Frankowski Tenement is a house located in Bydgoszcz, at 28 Gdańska Street.

== Location ==
The tenement stands on the eastern side of Gdańska Street, near the intersection with Krasinski street.

== History ==
On the site of the tenement was an earlier building, dating from approximately 1875. Actual house was commissioned by landlord Thomas Frankowski, a rentier. It has been built in 1897-1898 by the architect Fritz Weidner. At the time, the address was 156 Danzigerstrasse, Bromberg.

Fritz Weidner was a German builder who came to Bydgoszcz at the end of the 19th century. He conducted frantic building activity in the city between 1896 and 1914. From 1912, he lived in the house he built for himself at 34 Gdańska Street

In the same area, Fritz Weidner built houses at the following addresses:

- Ernst Mix tenement and movie theatre at 10 Gdańska Street (1905);
- George Sikorski Tenement at 31 Gdańska Street (1906);
- Max Rosental Tenement at 42 Gdańska Street (1905);
- Ernst Bartsch tenement at 79 Gdańska Street (1898);
- House at 3 Freedom Square (1903).

From 1909, the building housed the headquarters of the Bydgoszcz branch of Józef Madejewski's Institute of Trading Science created in 1892: the organization led educational courses related to geography, trade, modern communications, shorthand and typing.

During interwar period, the edifice housed Seifert & Forster's workshop, specialized in repairing cars and bicycles.

== Architecture ==
The tenement presents forms of German historicism, in a transitional phase between the eclecticism and secession style.

The whole facade is purposefully designed on asymmetry, which is a means of architectural expression, with stucco decoration for decorative arrangement on various elements: windows, arcade-loggias, bay window, balcony s gables and Peak ornaments.

Inside, original staircase, doors and decorative stained glasses are still preserved.

The building has been put on the Kuyavian-Pomeranian Voivodeship Heritage List, Nr.748678 Reg.A/1582, on February 16, 2011.

== Gallery ==
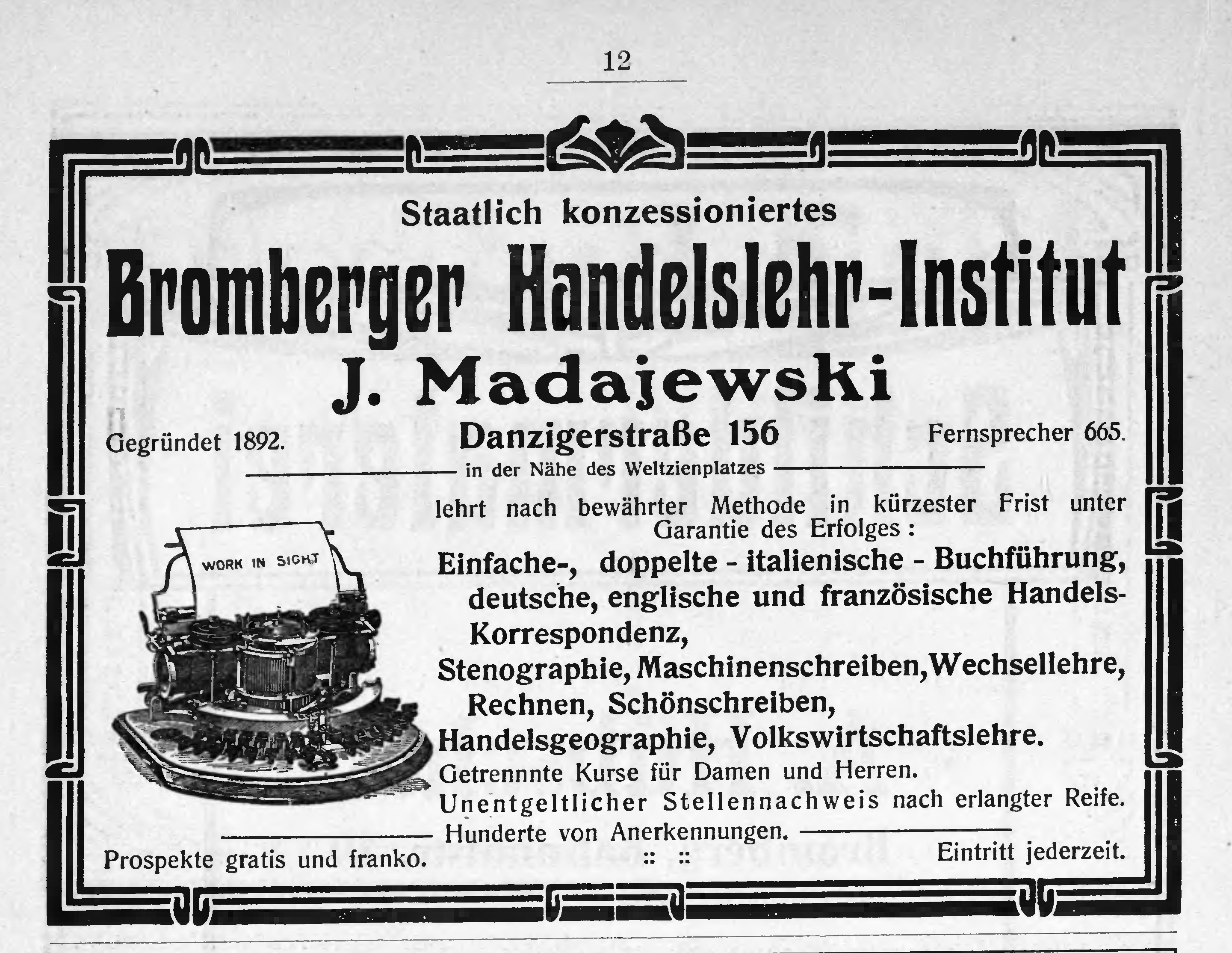
Ad for Joseph Madejewski's Institute, 1910

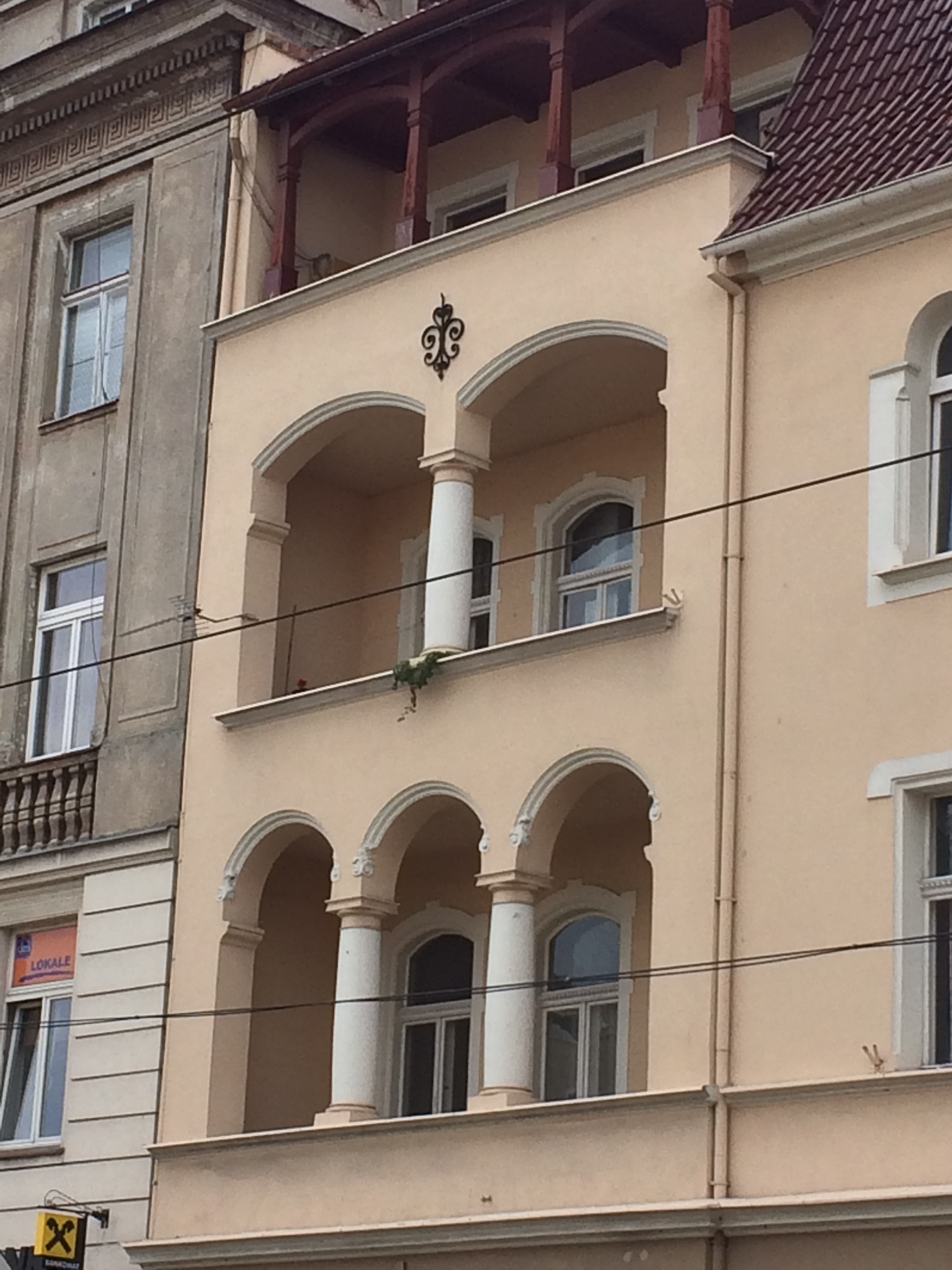
Loggia

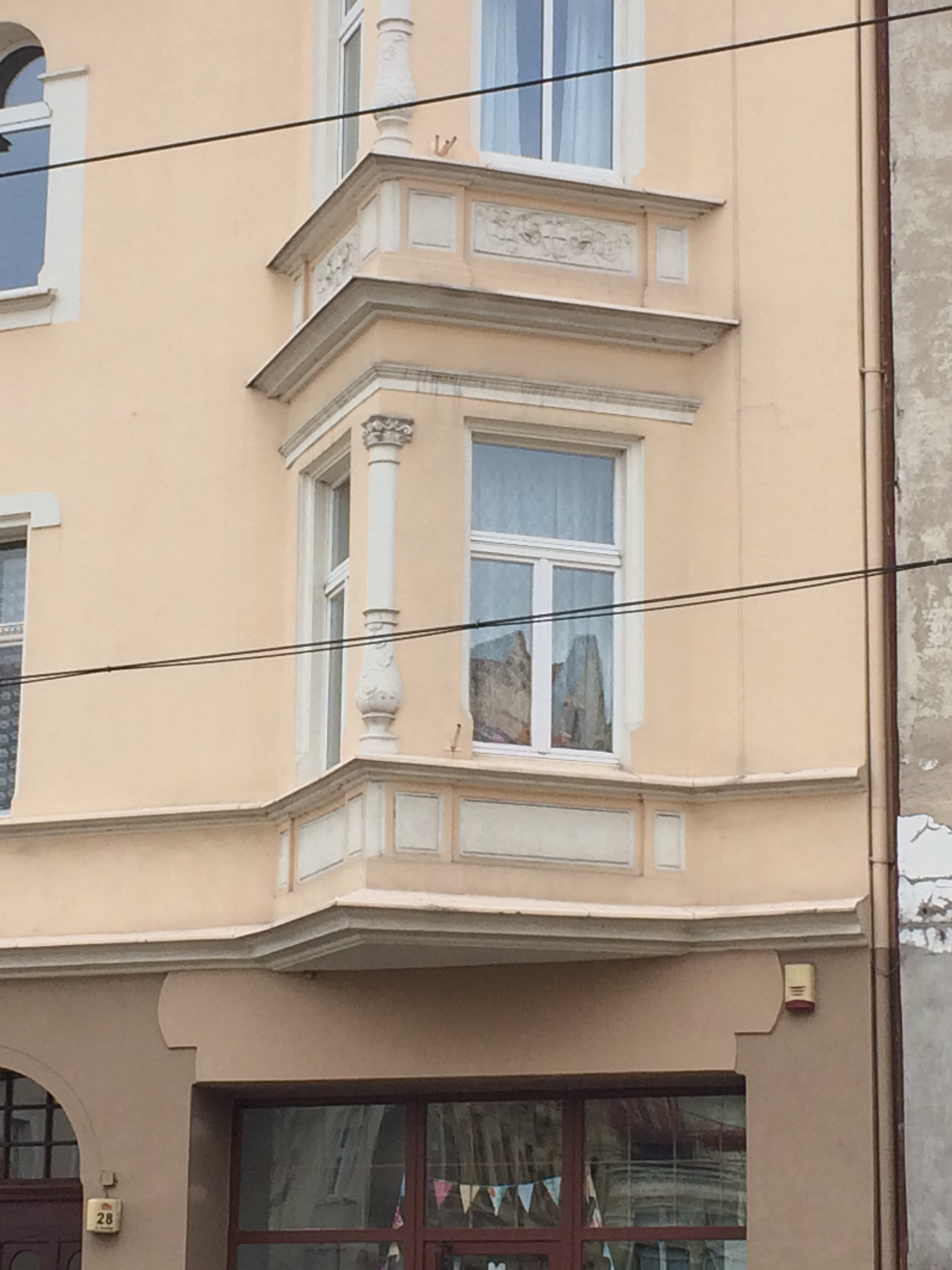
Bay windows

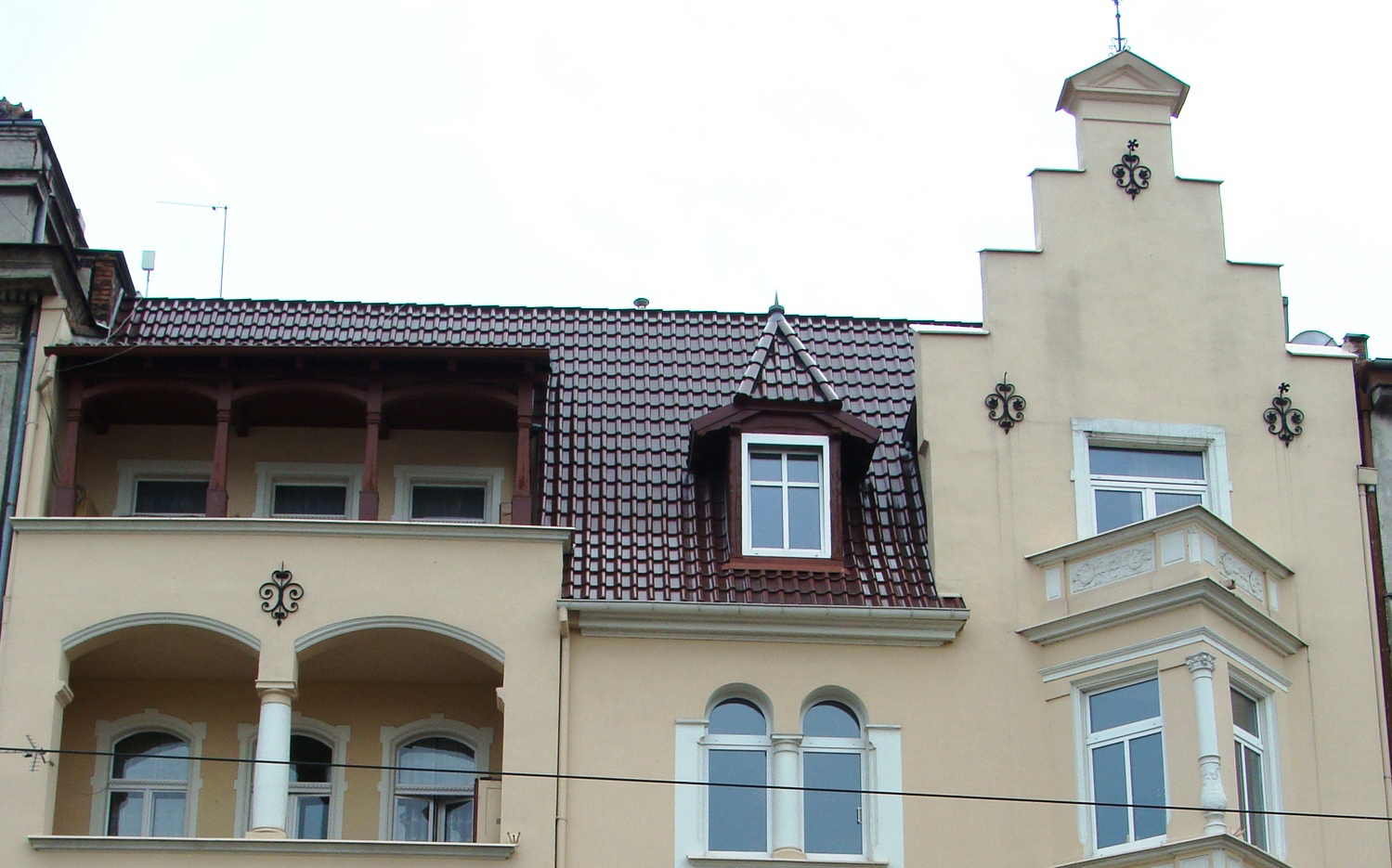
Detail of roof and Gable

== See also ==
- Gdanska Street in Bydgoszcz
- Bydgoszcz
- Fritz Weidner

== Bibliography ==
- (in Polish) Bręczewska-Kulesza Daria, Derkowska-Kostkowska Bogna, Wysocka A. (2003). Ulica Gdańska. Przewodnik historyczny. Bydgoszcz: Wojewódzki Ośrodek Kultury w Bydgoszczy. ISBN 9788386970100.
- (in Polish) Jastrzębska-Puzowska, Iwona (2002). Architekt Fritz Weidner i jego rola w kształtowaniu nowego oblicza Bydgoszczy na przełomie XIX i XX wieku-UMK. Toruń.
- (in German) Jastrzębska-Puzowska, Iwona. Der Bromberger Architekt Fritz Weidner – Kunstauffassung und Werk. Bydgoszcz/Bromberg.
