= Kwiatowa Street (Bydgoszcz) =

Street, Bydgoszcz, Poland, 19th-20th century

Kwiatowa street in Bydgoszcz
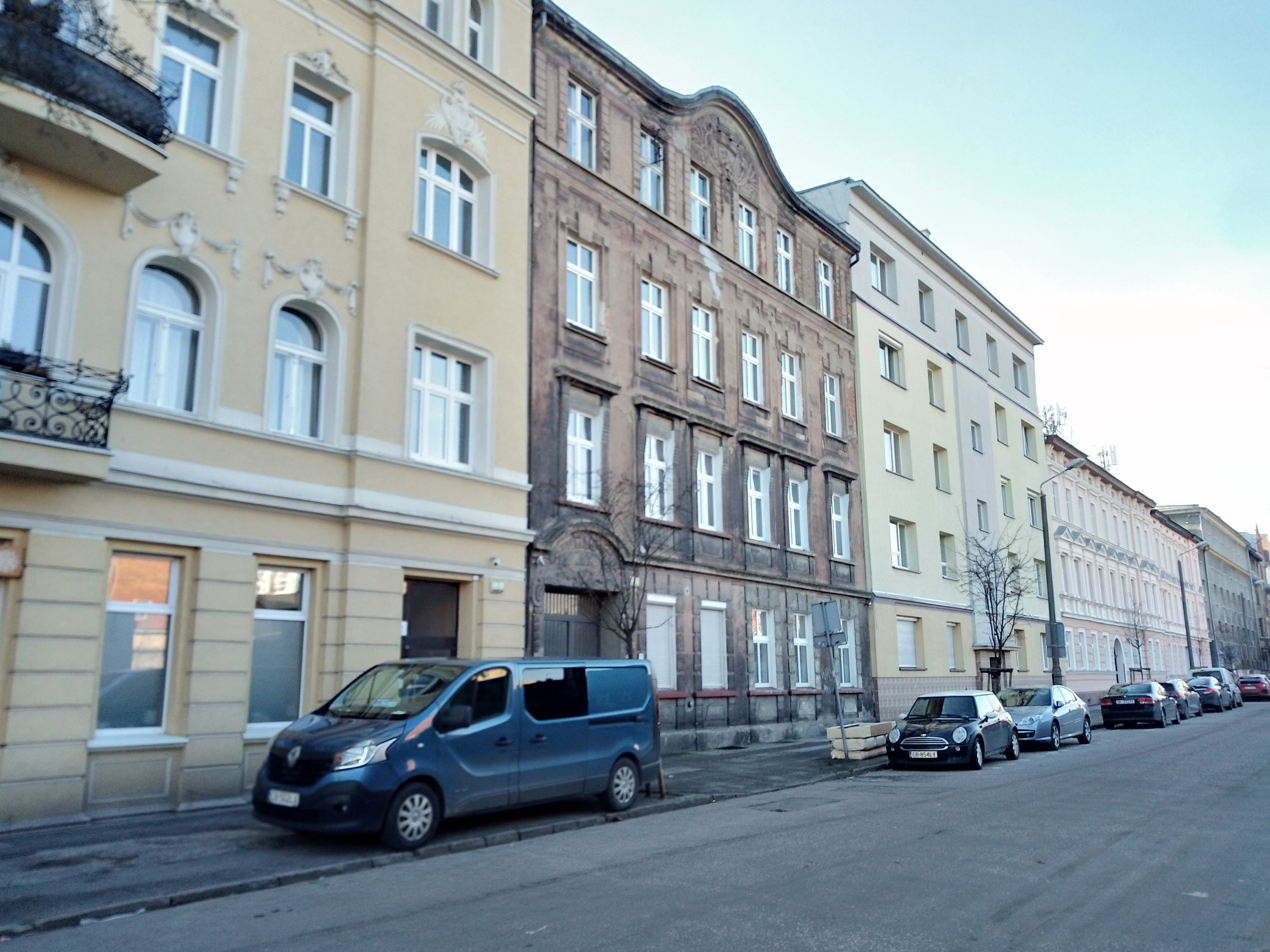
- Westward view

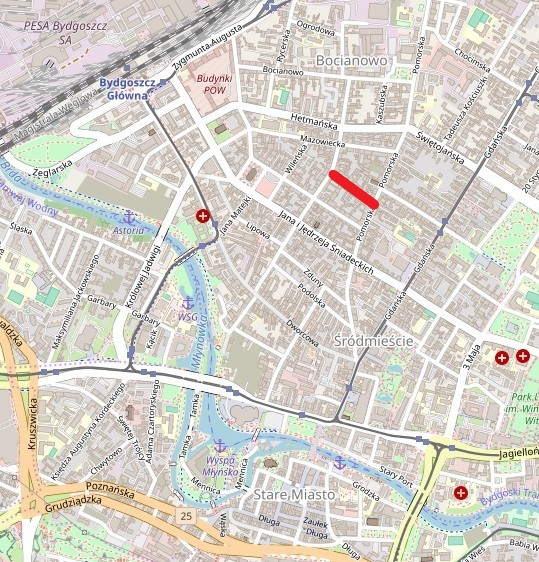
- Kwiatowa street highlighted on a map
- Native name: Ulica Kwiatowa w Bydgoszczy (Polish)
- Former name: Blumen Straße
- Part of: Śródmieście district
- Namesake: Flower
- Owner: City of Bydgoszcz
- Length: 200 m (660 ft)
- Width: c. 10 metres (33 ft)
- Location: Bydgoszcz, Poland
- Coordinates: 53°07′54″N 18°00′13″E

Construction
- Construction start: Late 1880s

Kwiatowa street is a short pathway in downtown Bydgoszcz, presenting several architectural buildings erected during a period stretching from the end of the 19th century to the 1930s.

== Location ==
The street links Pomorska Street in the east to Sienkiewicza Street in the west. Its path is parallel to Chrobrego and Cieszkowskigo Streets.

== History ==
Kwiatowa street only appeared in the maps of then Bromberg in 1886, where, according to the address book of the time, only one plot was built. The development of the area occurred rather slowly compared to other streets in the district: most of the parcels were constructed only by 1920.

During its existence, the street's name switched between German and Polish:

- till 1920 and from 1939 to 1945 "Blumenstraße";
- in 1920–1939 and after 1945, "Ulica Kwiatowa".

In both languages, the name refers to Flower street (German: Blumen), (Polish: Kwiata).

== Main areas and edifices ==
=== Tenement at 1, corner with 35 Pomorska Street ===
1897–1899, by Fritz Weidner

Eclecticism & forms of Neo-Baroque and Art Nouveau

Hermann Schulz, a wealthy baker, charged Fritz Weidner to design his habitation, which initial address was Rinkauerstraße 22-23. A thorough refurbishment has been carried out in 2015 by a real estate firm.

Architecturally, the facade echoes the style of corner house with Podolska street, at the southern part of Pomorska street. The façade of the building is decorated with reliefs, floral stucco ornaments and putti. Arched windows, loggias, balconies flanked by massive columns richly adorn the elevation. One can underline the detailed low-relief of Demeter with Cupid as a putto on the first floor, testifying to the wealth of original owner (H. Schulz): as a baker, the image of the goddess of corn, grain, and harvest could be the only patron.

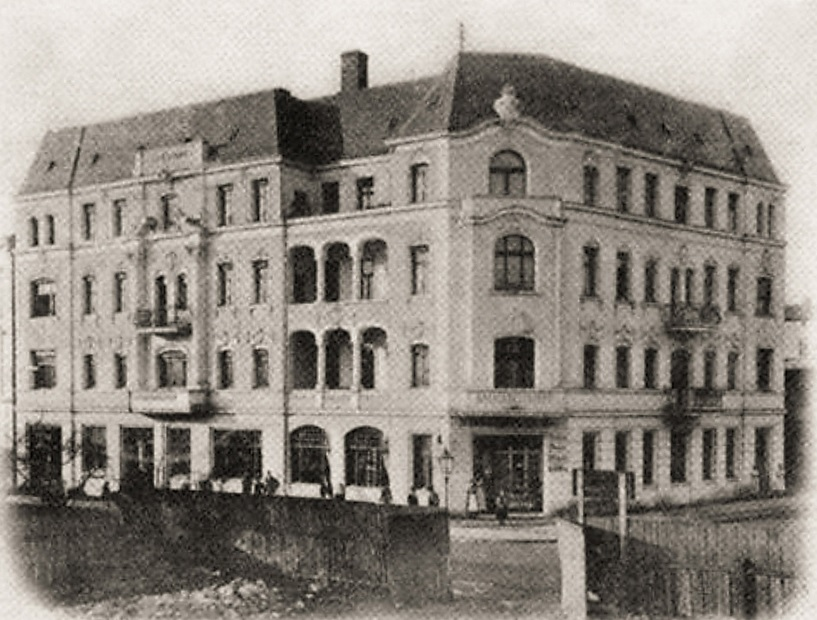
The building ca 1900

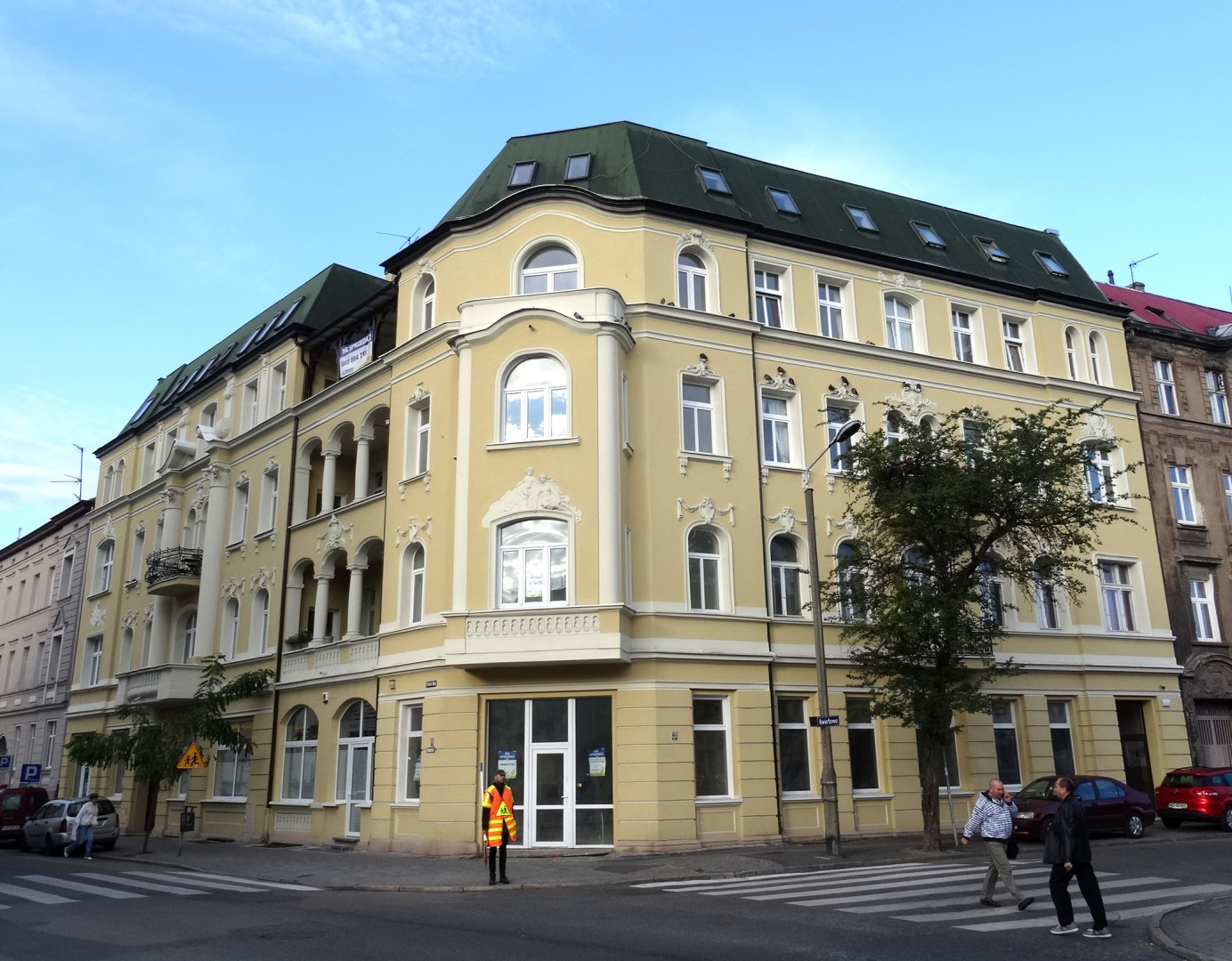
Corner view of both facades

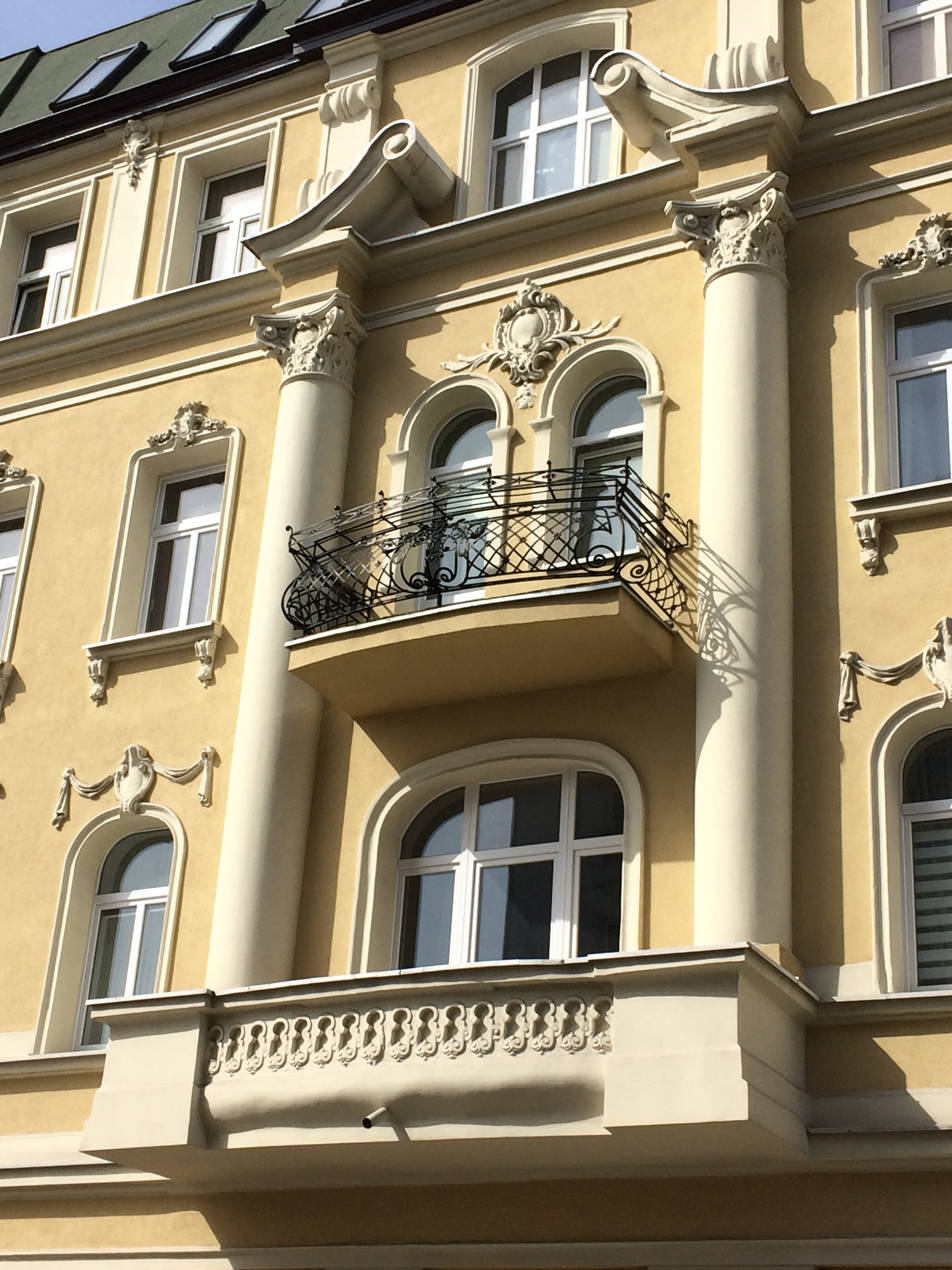
Detail of columns and balcony

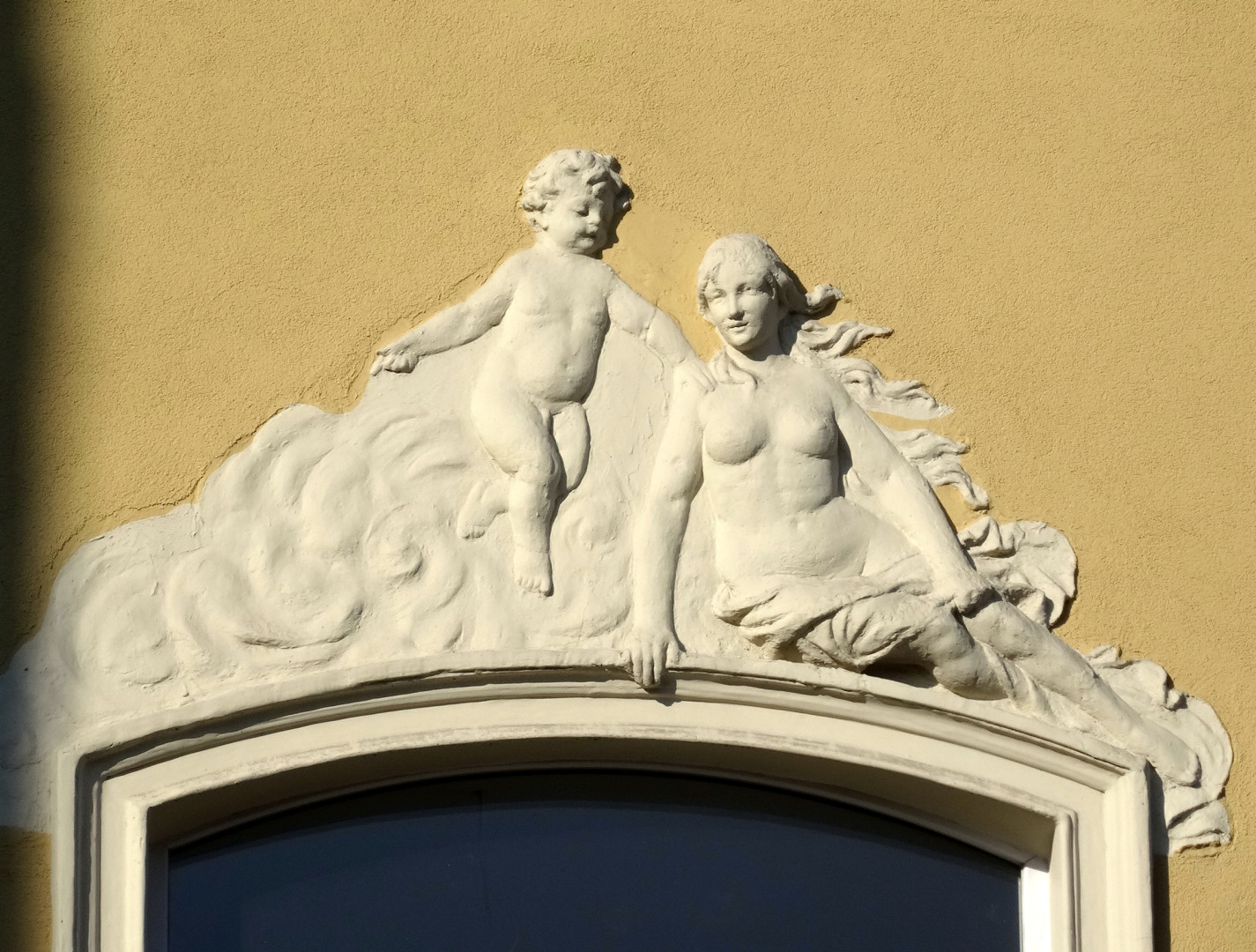
Cupid and Demeter

=== Tenement at 37 Pomorska Street, corner with Kwiatowa street ===
1885

Eclecticism

Its first landlord was Julius Baumann, registered as a blacksmith.

The building has been renovated in 2020.

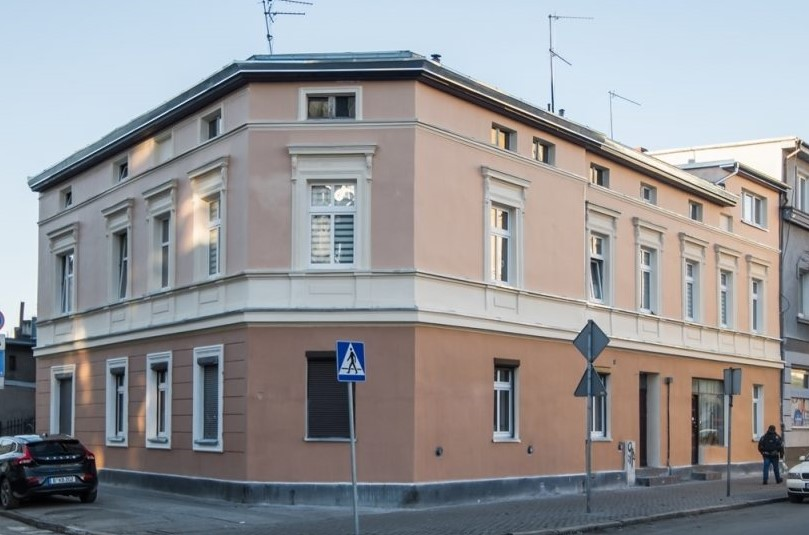
Corner view

=== Tenement at 3 ===
1906-1907

Art Nouveau

The tenement was first owned by a rentier, Adolf Frölich living in "Friedenstraße" (today's Jasna street). Its original numbering ("1a" Blumenstraße) is still visible on the entrance lintel.

The facade displays remarkable Art Nouveau motifs, in particular the floral stuccoed ornaments embellishing the main entrance and the top wall gable, which bears in addition a mascaron.

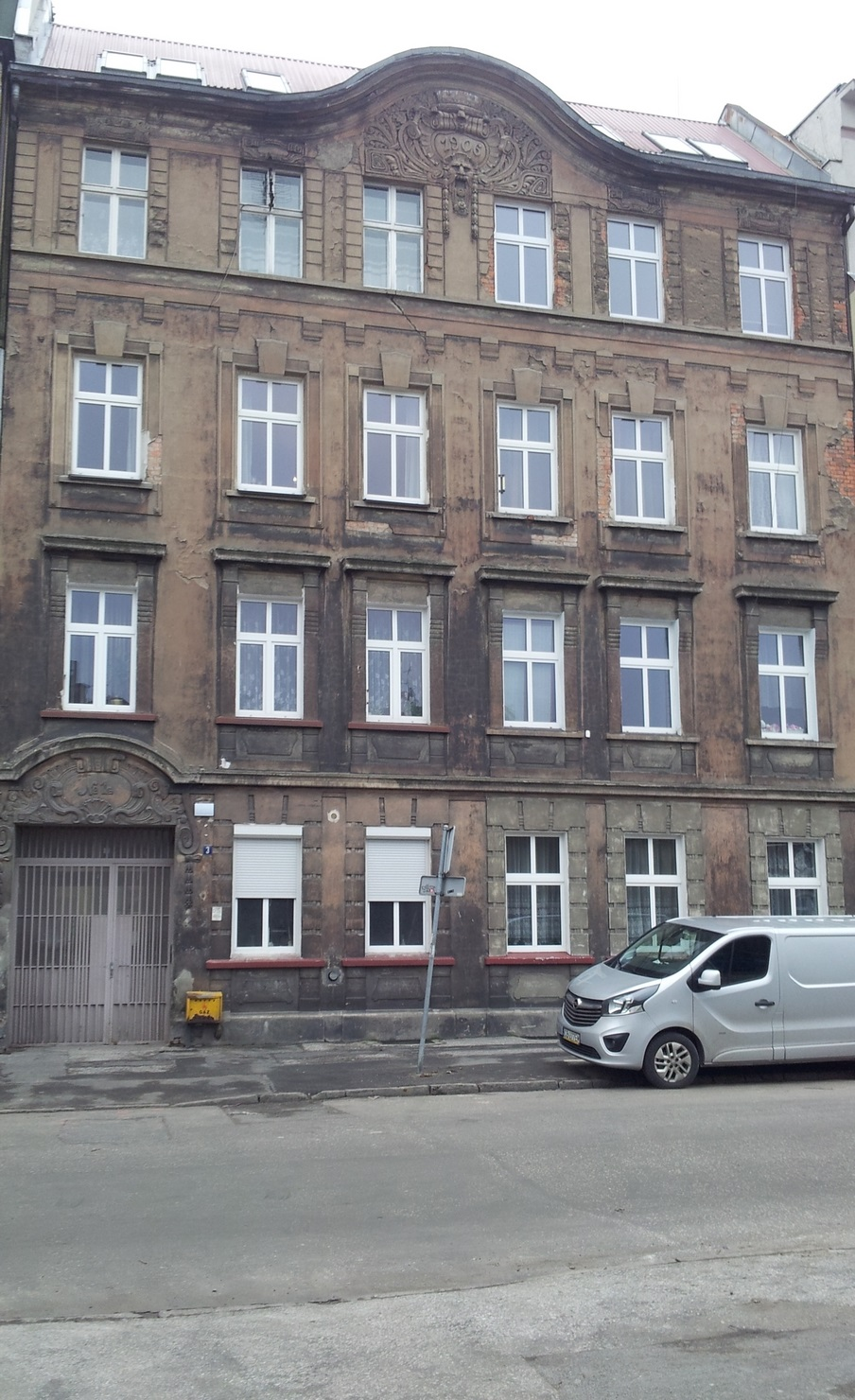
Main facade

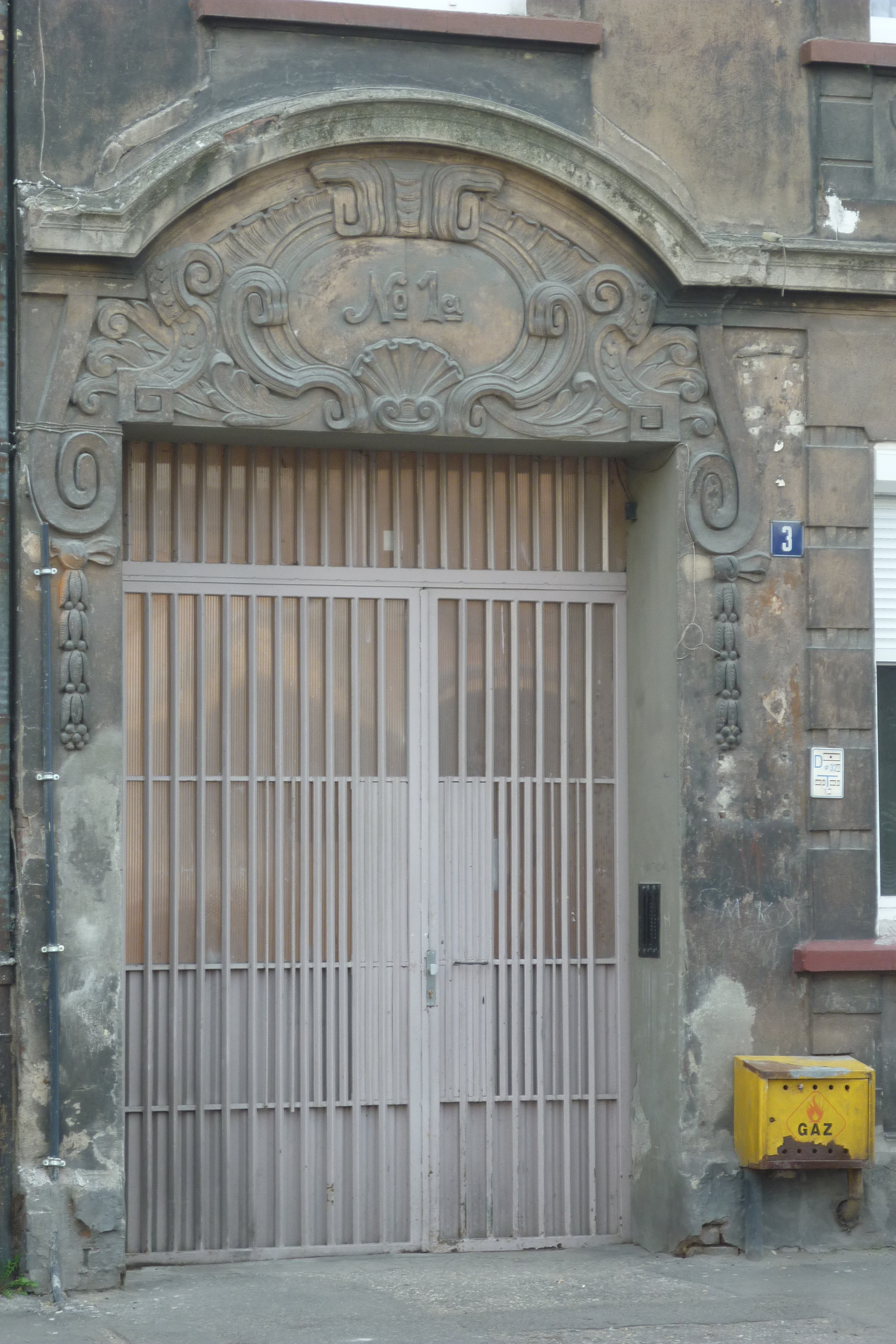
Adorned entrance

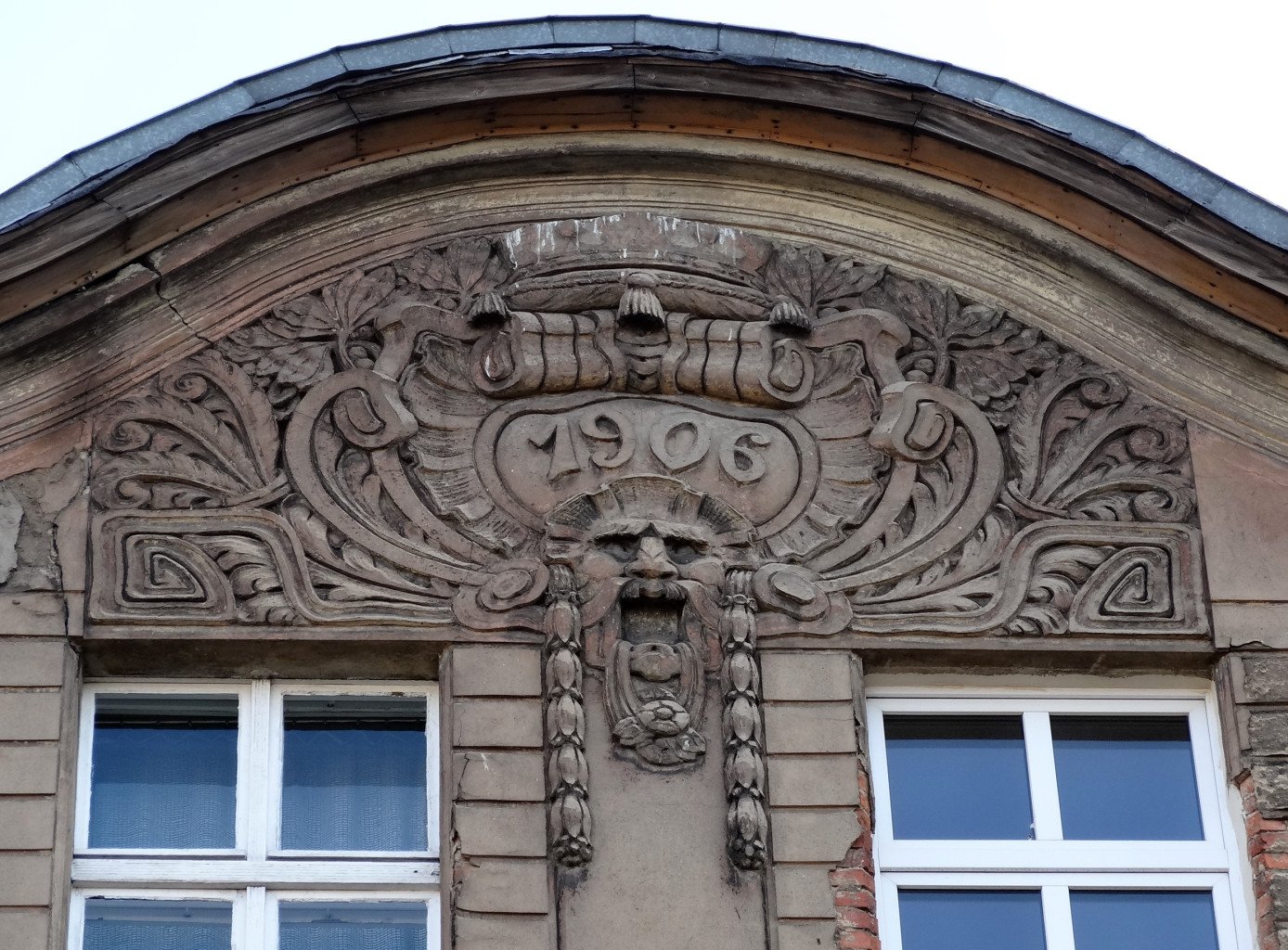
Decoration of the top wall gable on the street

=== Plot at 4 ===
1920s

Industrial architecture

The parcel, built between interwar period, was occupied by a workshop producing baskets (Polish: Fabryka Wyborow Koszykarskich). The place is still used by different workshops.

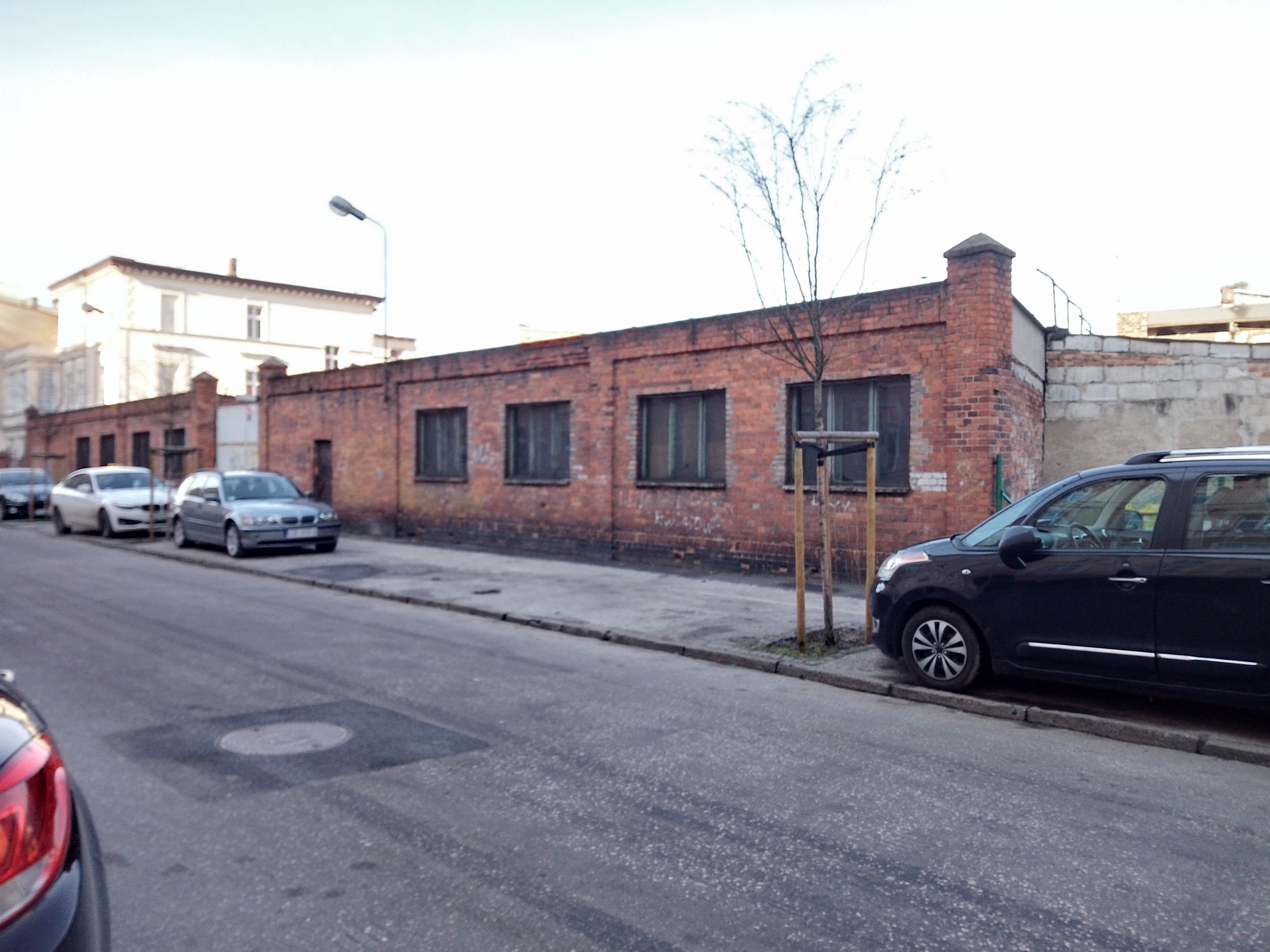
The plot viewed from the street

=== Tenement at 5 ===
Post 1950s

Modern architecture

The building was preceded by a tailor workshop owned by Gustaw Zerull.

The current edifice built after WWII features modernist architecture.

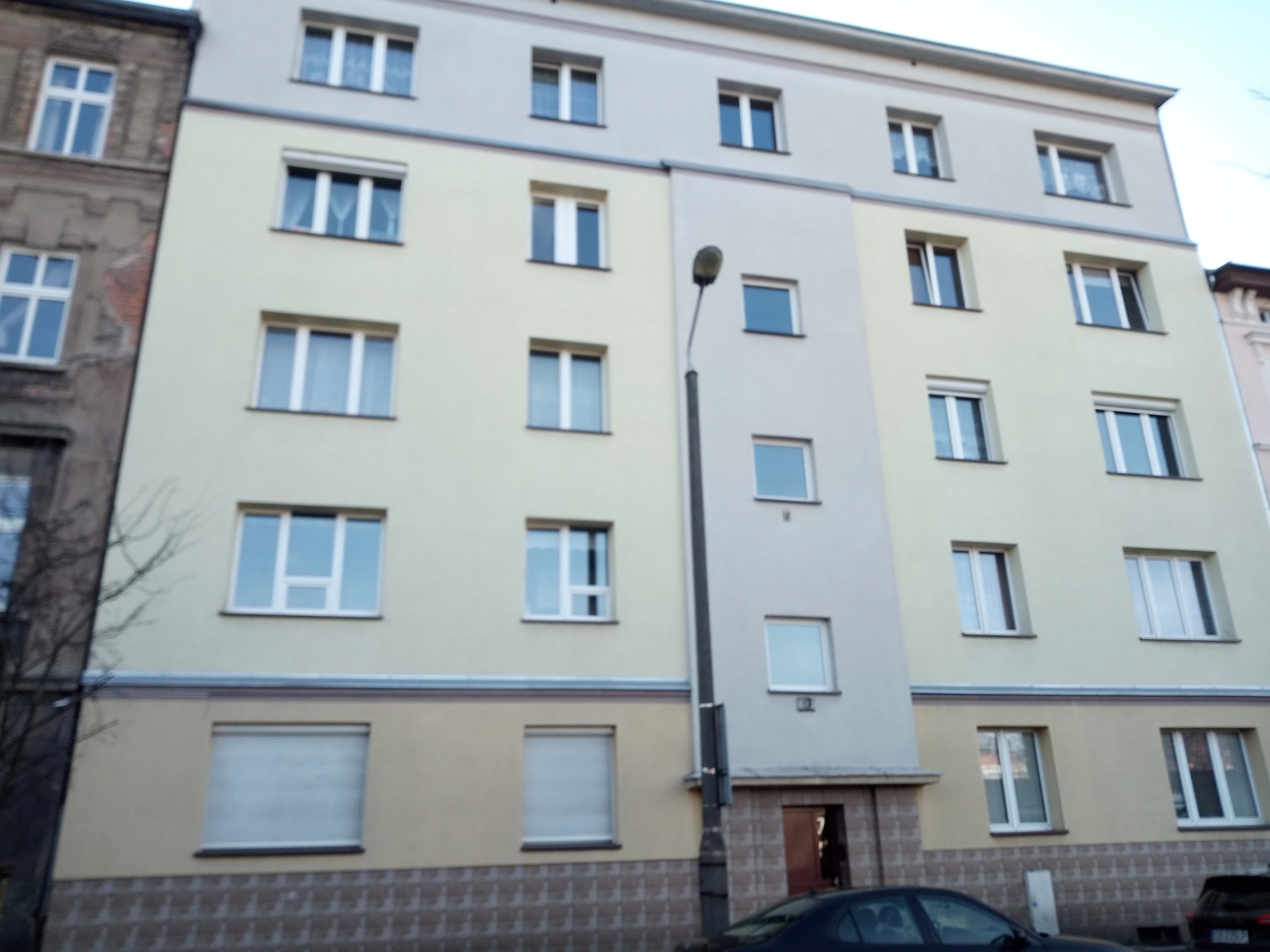
Main facade

=== Lewandowski's tenement at 6 ===
1892-1893

Eclecticism

Hermann Lewandowski, a building contractor (German: bauunternehmer), commissioned this house. He owned it till the mid-1920s: there used to live railway workers, minor officials, teachers and military personnel from the nearby barracks at Warszawska street.

The tenement has been refurbished in 2020. It displays a mix of brick and stucco elements, including bossage, window pediments, a nice side avant-corps on the main elevation topped by a terrace as well as corbel tables all along the eaves.

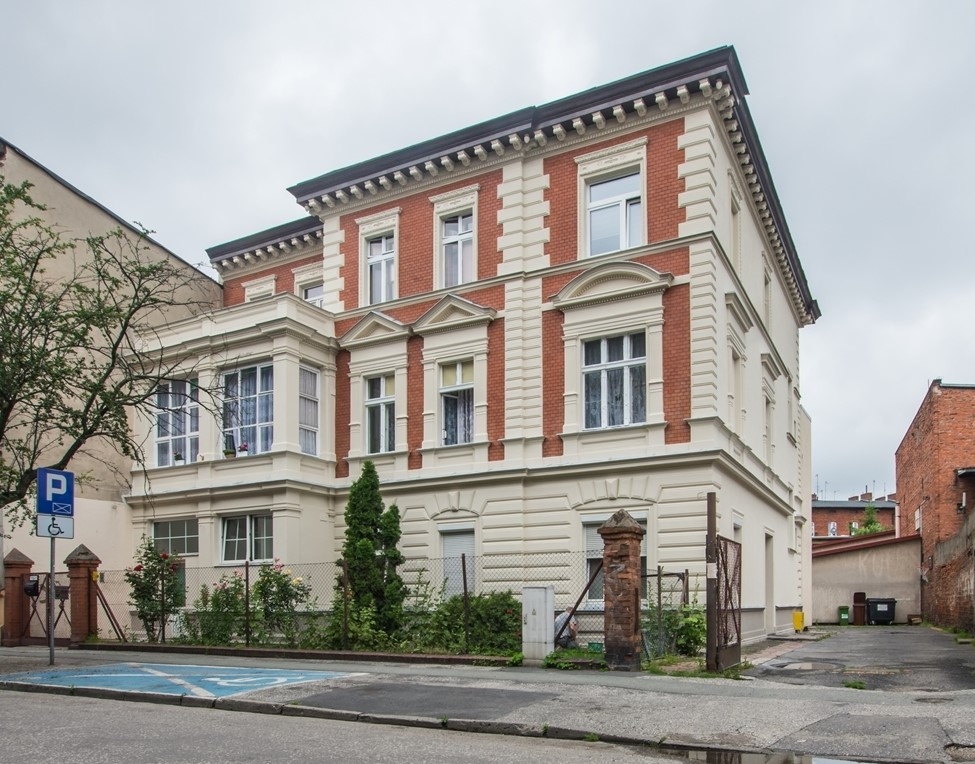
View from the street

=== Tenement at 7 ===
1892-1893

Eclecticism

The first landlord, Leo Neumann, was a rentier. Otto Klann owned the building from 1910 till the 1930s: he had been running there a painting workshop.

Renovated in 2020, the front elevation is richly decorated. The central gateway is topped with a full arch. The ground floor displays bossage features while the first floor boasts extensive decoration around the openings. Uncovered during the rehabilitation, German writings dating from the 1910s is now visible.

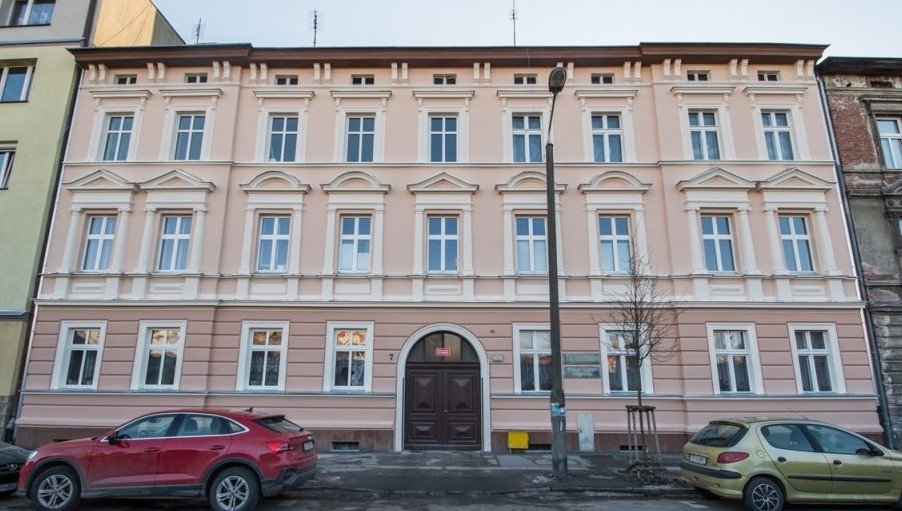
Renovated facade

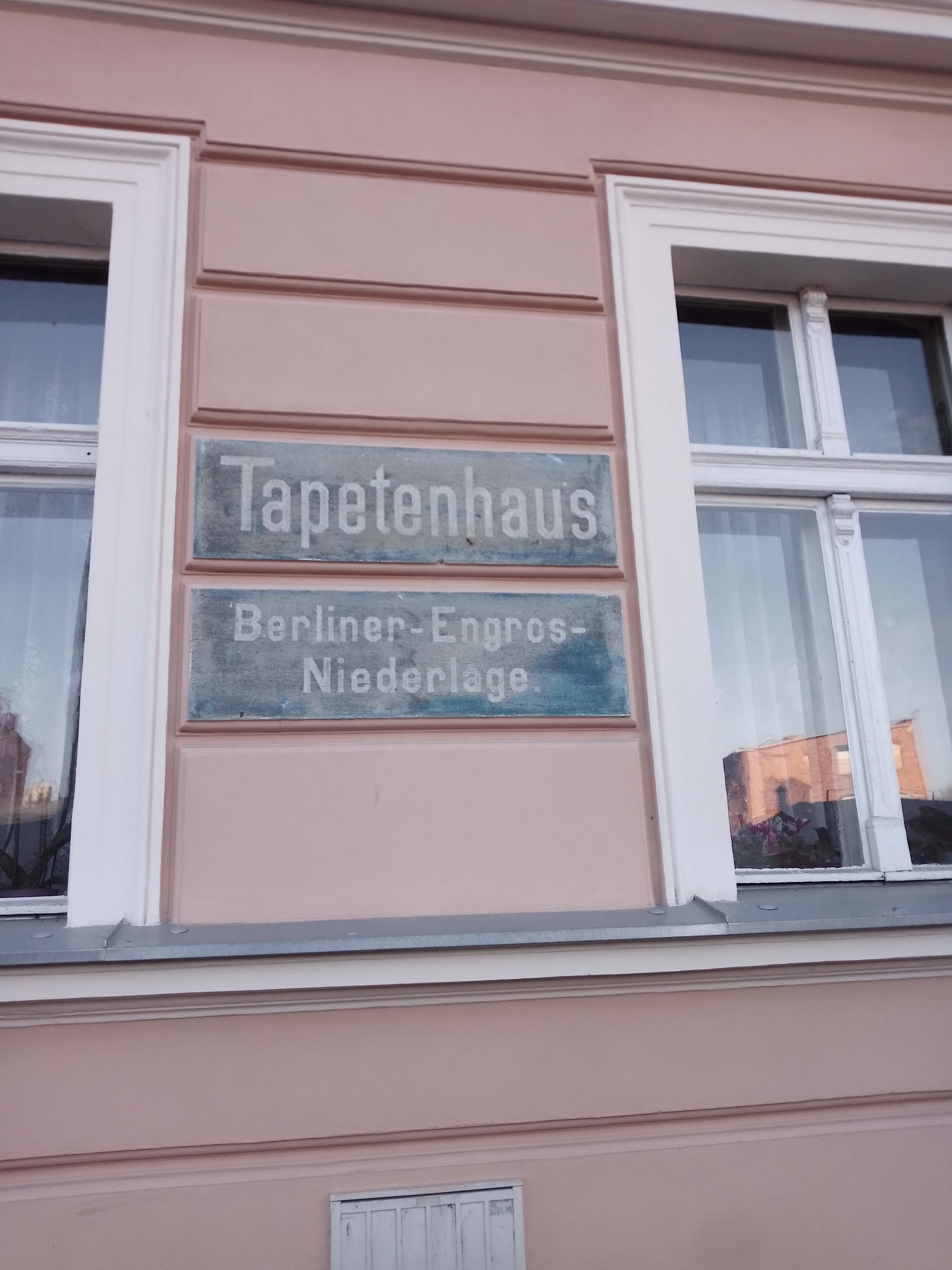
Ancient German advert

=== Tenement at 8 ===
1887

Eclecticism

This tenement, then at "10 Blumenstraße", was the property of Julius Lüdtke, who rented its rooms.

The building, one of the oldest in the street, features eclectic style.

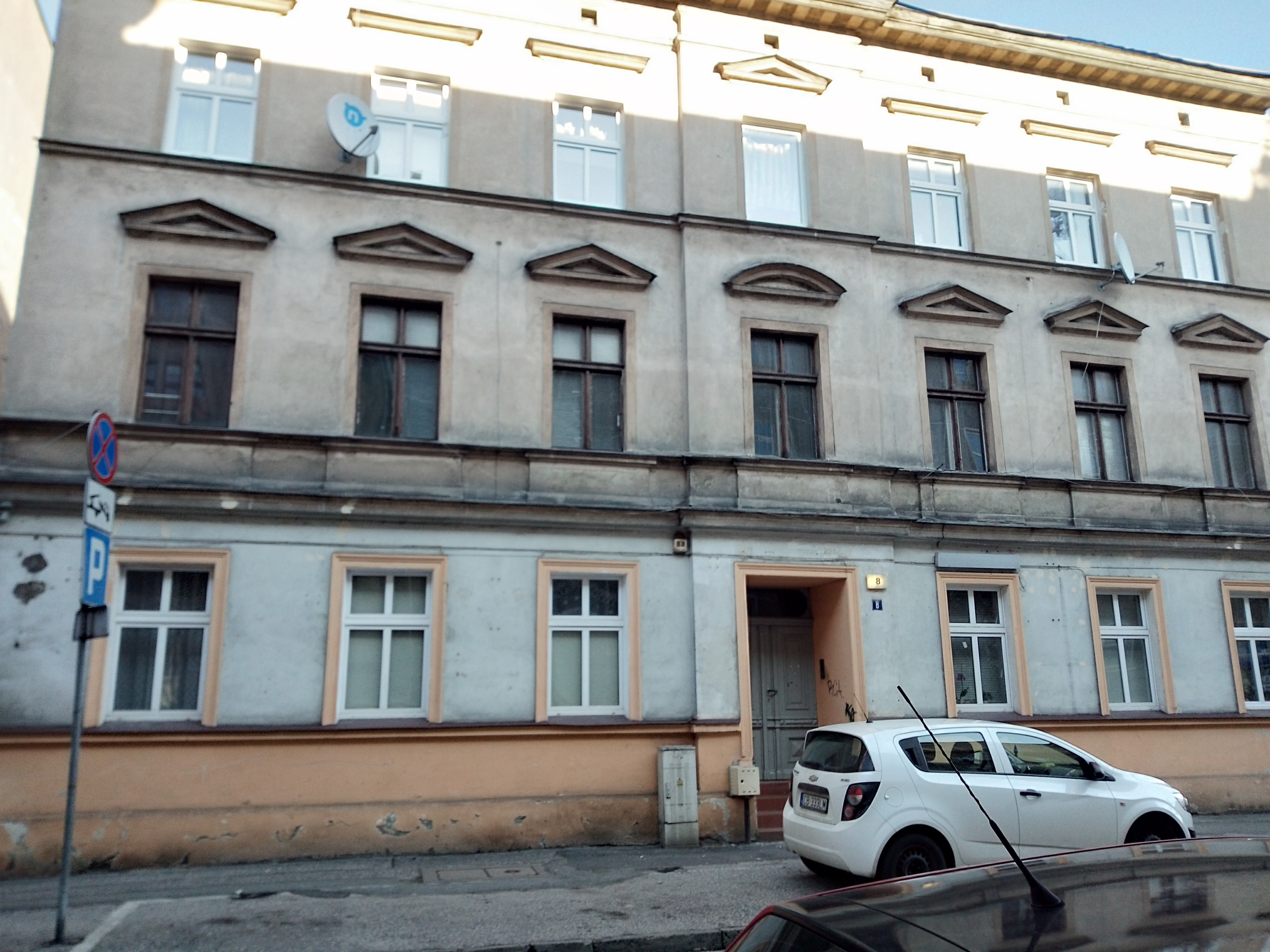
View from the street

=== Tenement at 9 ===
1893-1894

Eclecticism

Heinrich ßietsch, a tailor, was the commissioner of the building at the end of the 19th century.

The edifice has been overhauled in 2021, highlighting its decoration. In particular, one can mention the three mascarons portraying a Pan-like figure which crown the ground floor openings. In addition, the opposite windows on the first floor display abundant architectural details (pediments, adorned jambs and sill).

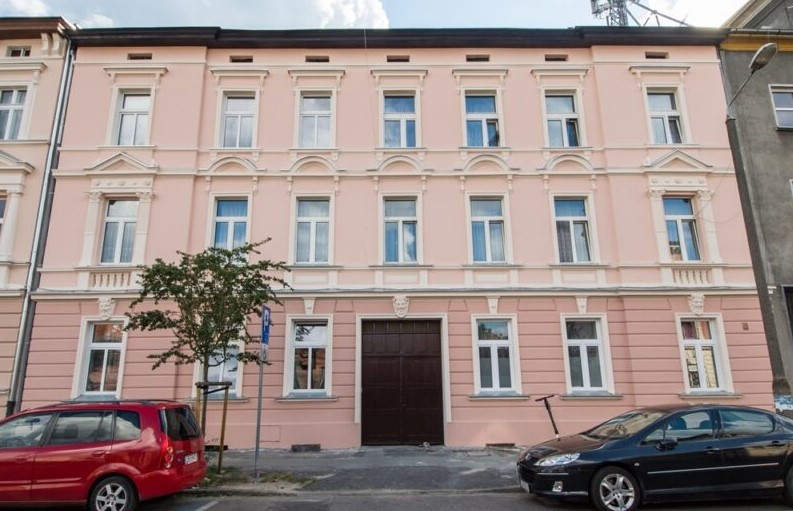
Main elevation

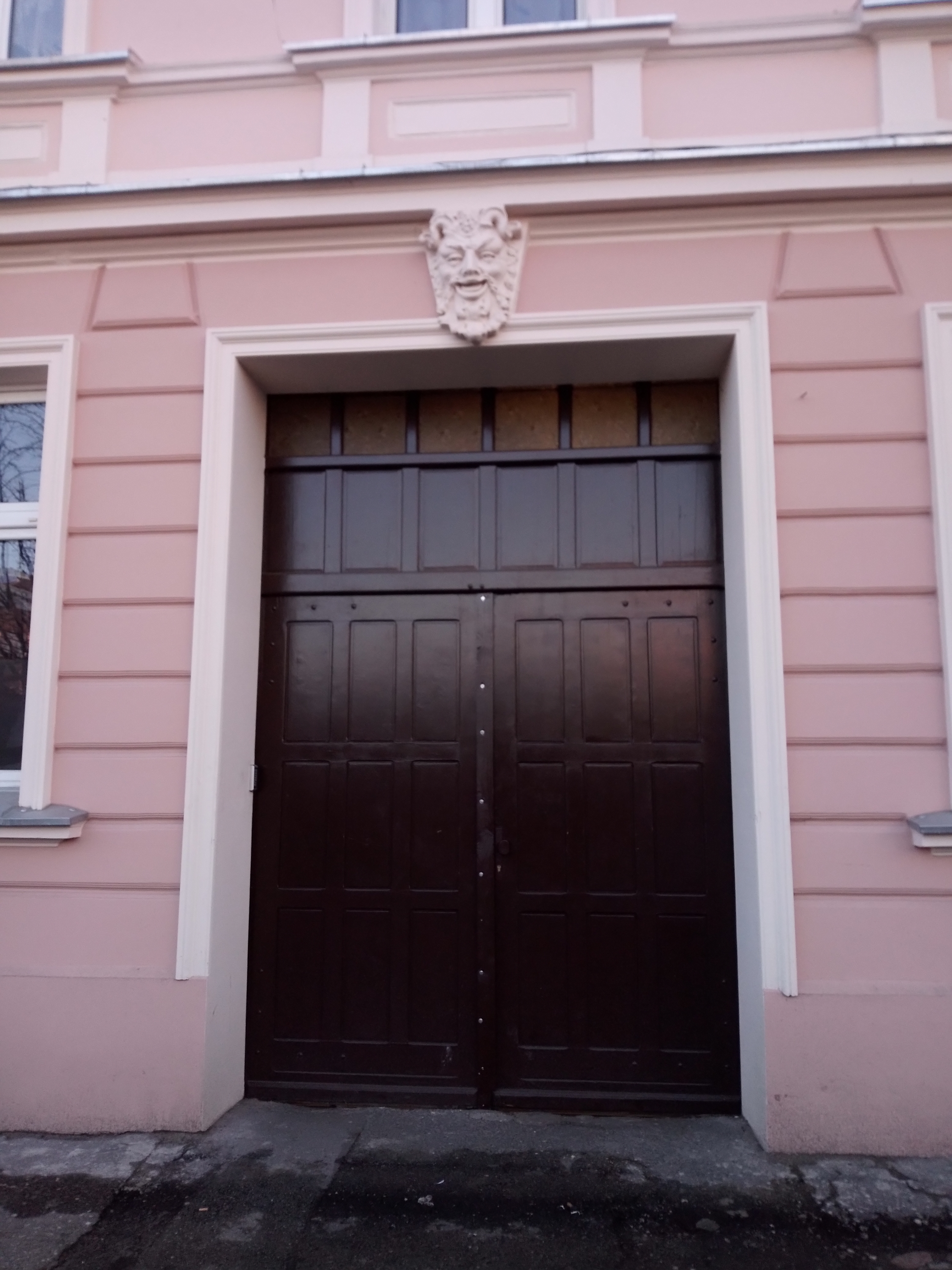
Main door

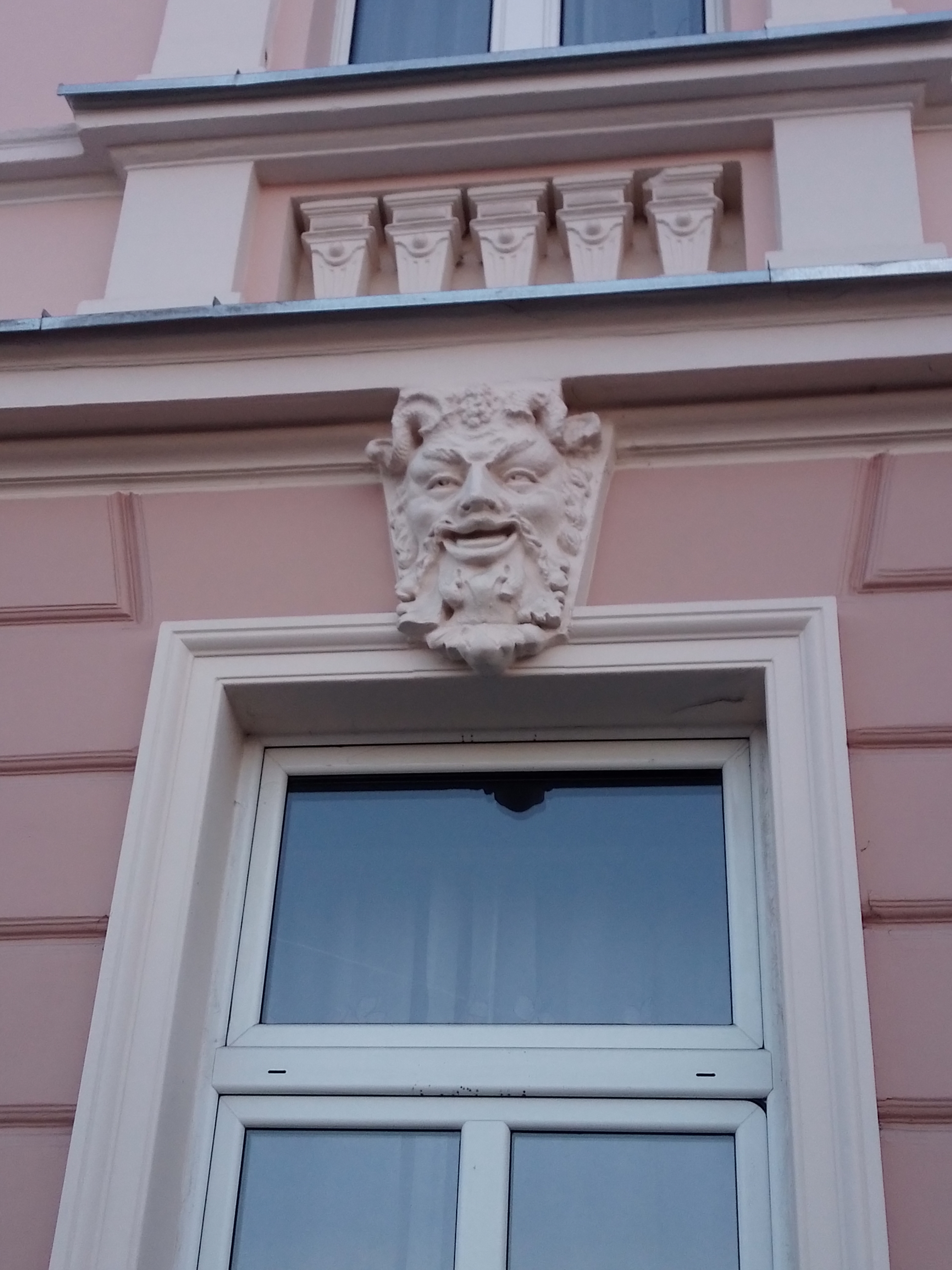
Pan-like mascaron

=== Tenement at 10 ===
1907-1908

Early modernism

First registered owner was Mr. Rößke, a railway technician.

The building exhibits modernist characteristics underlying long vertical lines and very few motifs. The facade is emphasized by the heavy bay window mixed with balconies which overhangs the street. The main entrance present a curved transom light still bearing a "9", from the initial street numbering.

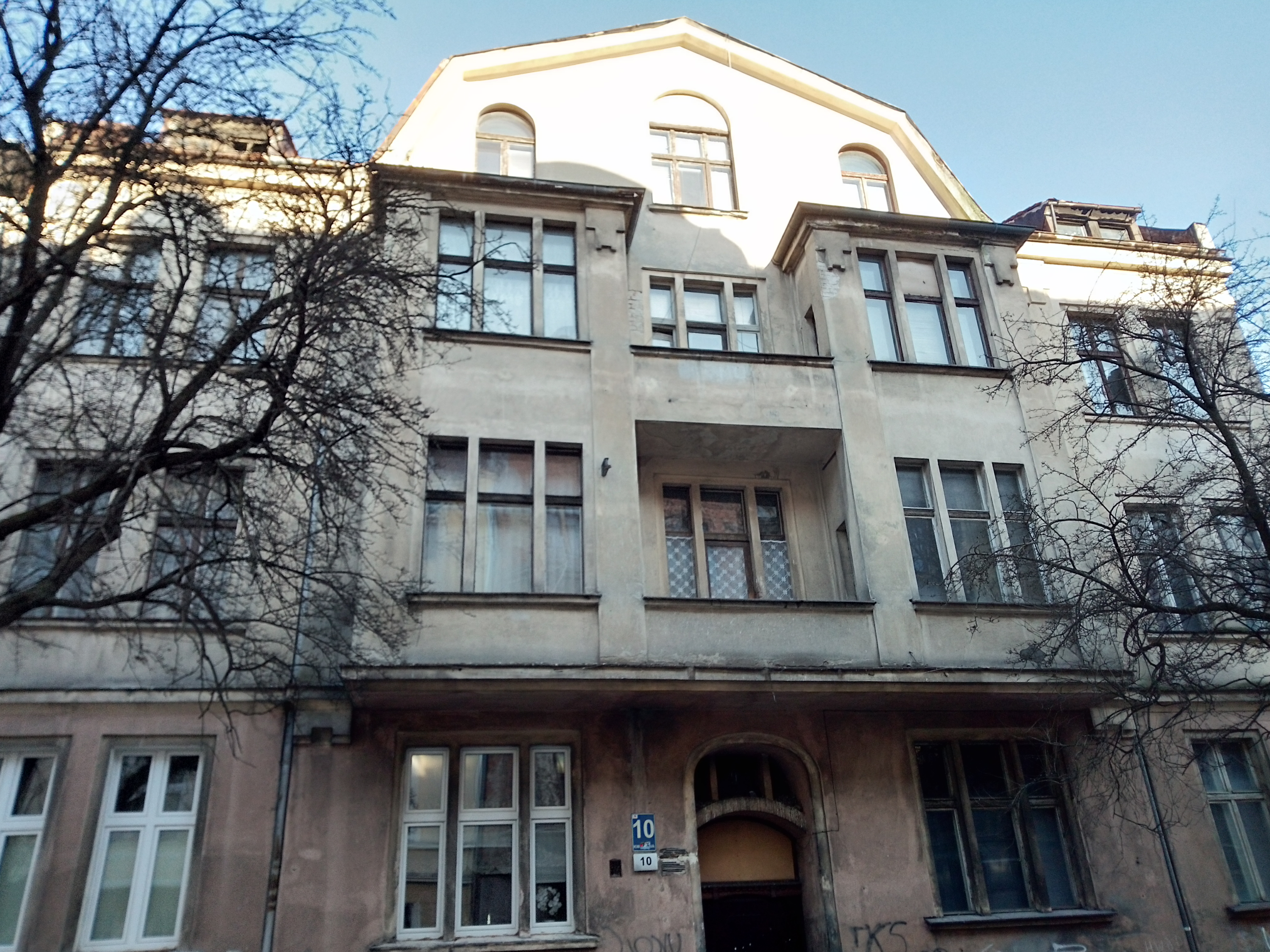
Main elevation

=== Building at 11-13 ===
Post 1950s

Modern architecture

The parcel stayed bare from construction till the end of WWII.

The current edifice features modernist architecture.

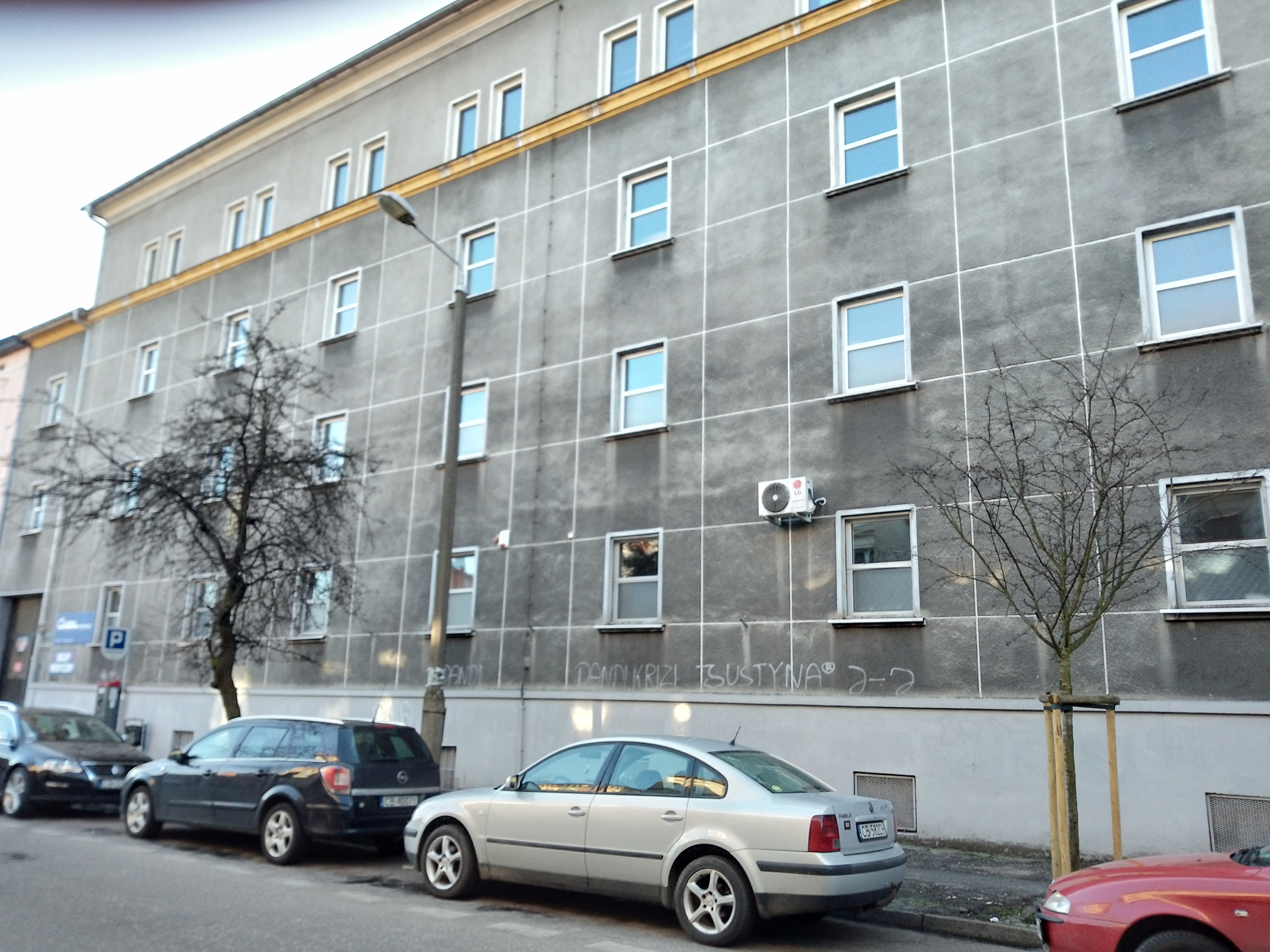
Grand facade on the street

=== Building at 32 Sienkiewicza street, corner with Kwiatowa street ===
1883

Eclecticism

The first landlord is identified as Rudolf Duda, working in the railway business. The plot changed four times its house numbering: "25 Mittelstraße" (1885), "28 Mittelstraße" (1900), "48 Mittelstraße" (1915) and today's "32 Sienkiewicza street".

The refurbishment completed in 2020 salvaged the elevation which was in a bad technical condition.Furthermore, the facade probably lost its architectural details in the course of earlier works.

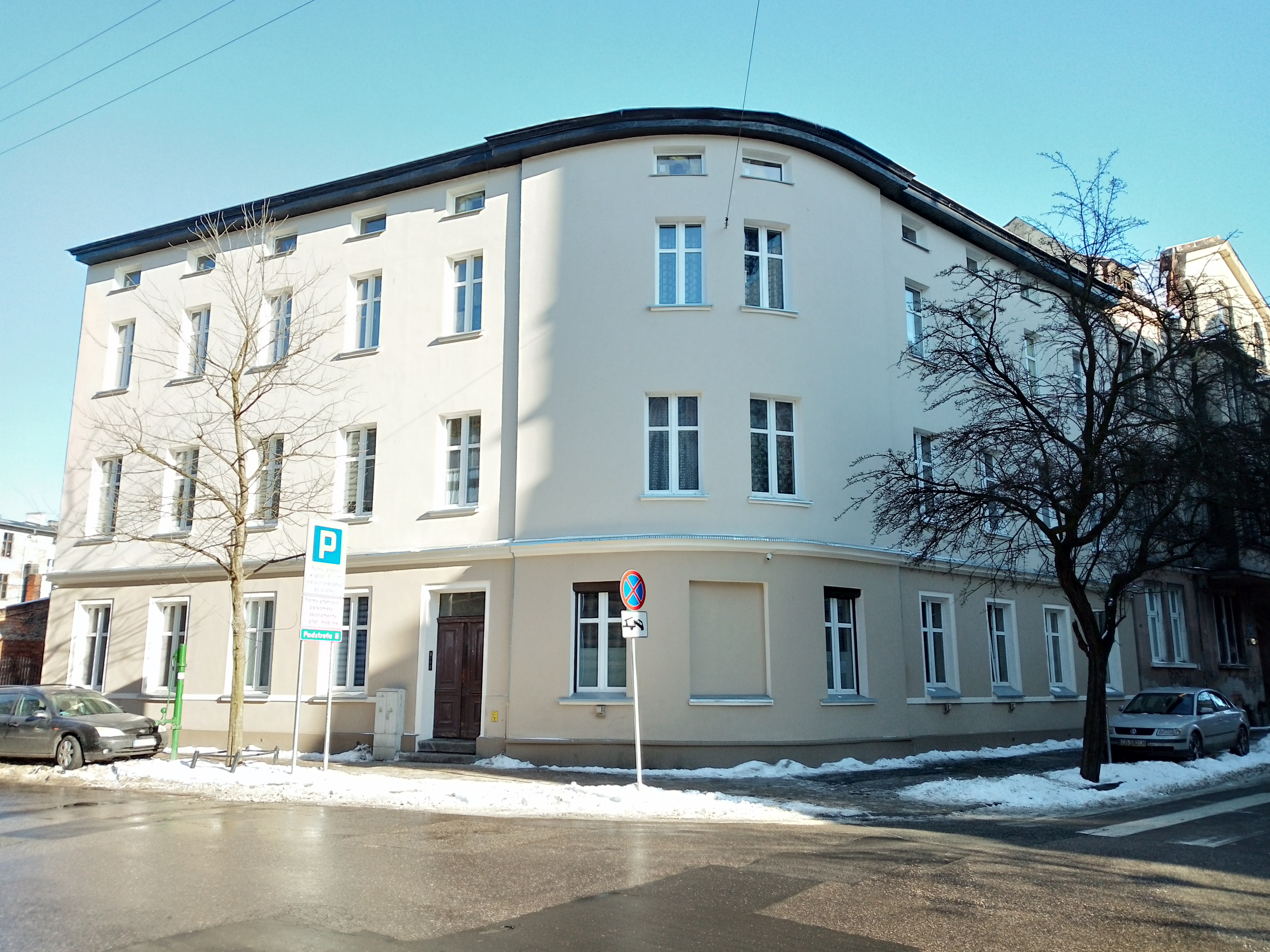
View from the street crossing

=== Tenement at 15 ===
1911-1912, by Georg Baesler

Late Art Nouveau

Anton Grabowski, the initial landlord, was also owner of the abutting building at the corner with Sienkiewicza street (then "Mittelstraße"). He was a metalworker.

The frontage, renovated at the beginning of 2026, is balanced by two curved bay windows. Some preserved elements of architecture are still visible on the ground floor: an entrance portal flanked by two columns and topped by an elliptic transom, and a floral motif frieze running all the way along wall.

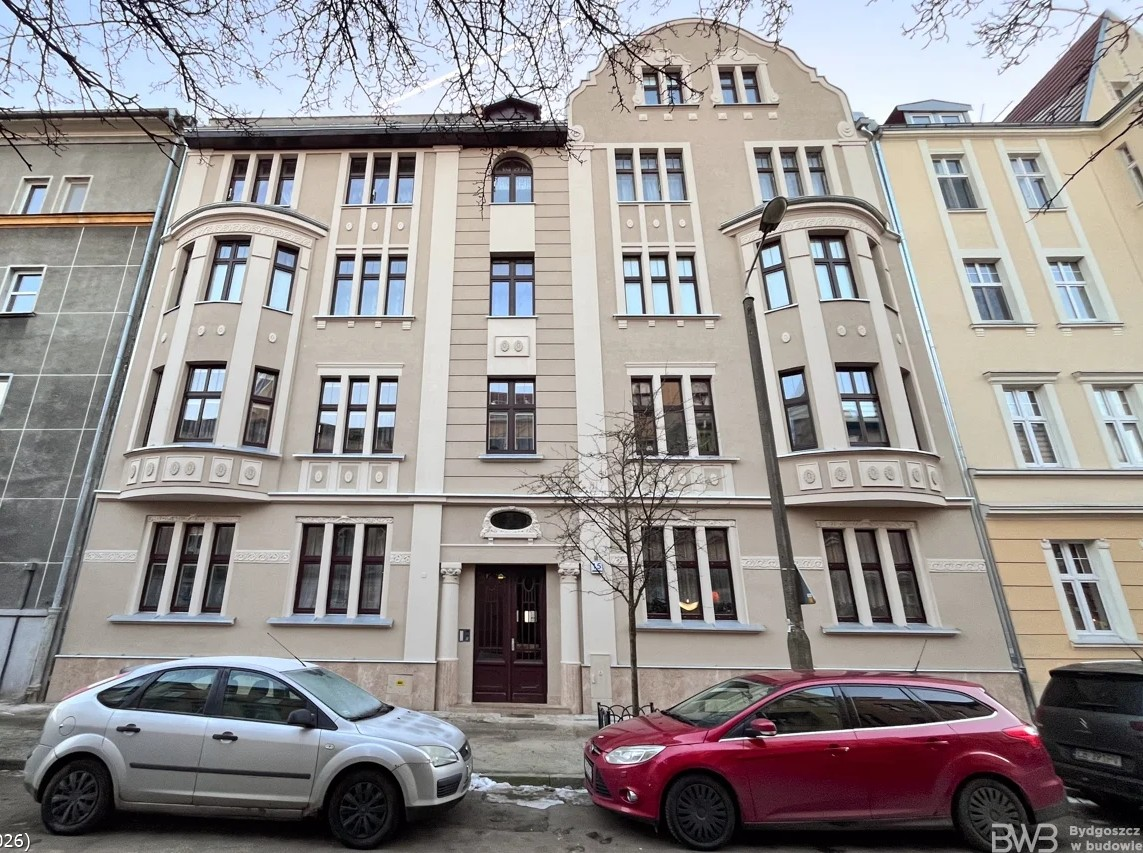
Main elevation

=== Tenement at 17, corner with Sienkiewicza street ===
1911-1912, by Georg Baesler

Art Nouveau, early Modern architecture

The commissioner of this building was Anton Grabowski, a master metalworker, living at "14 Blumenstraße" (today's 2 Kwiatowa street, house nonexistent). He also owned the tenement at 15.

Renovated in 2020, one can appreciate in particular the bartizan overhanging at the corner, the bay windows and the numerous stuccoed motifs present in cartouches or on vertical friezes.

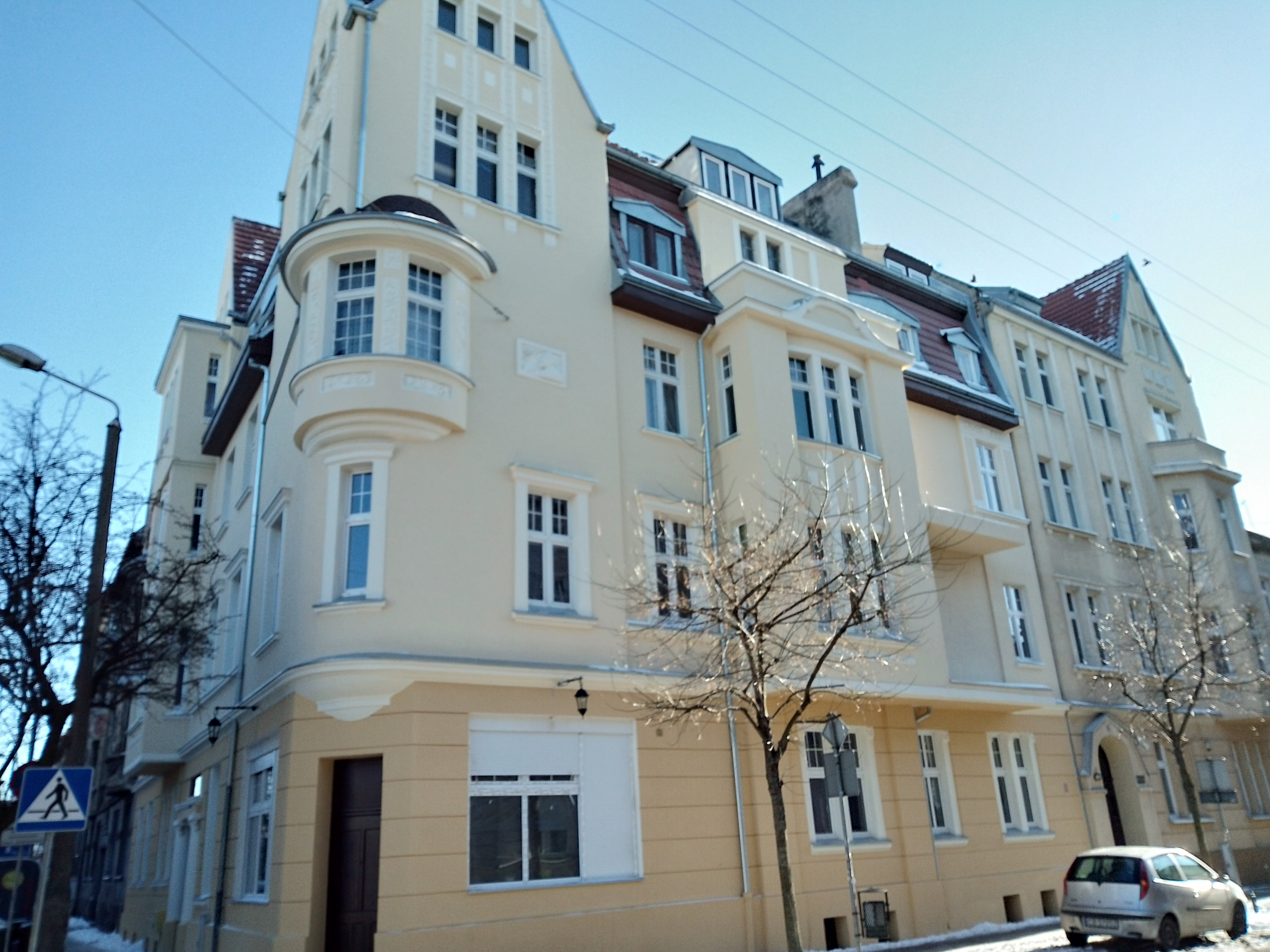
Elevation Sienkiewicza street after refurbishing

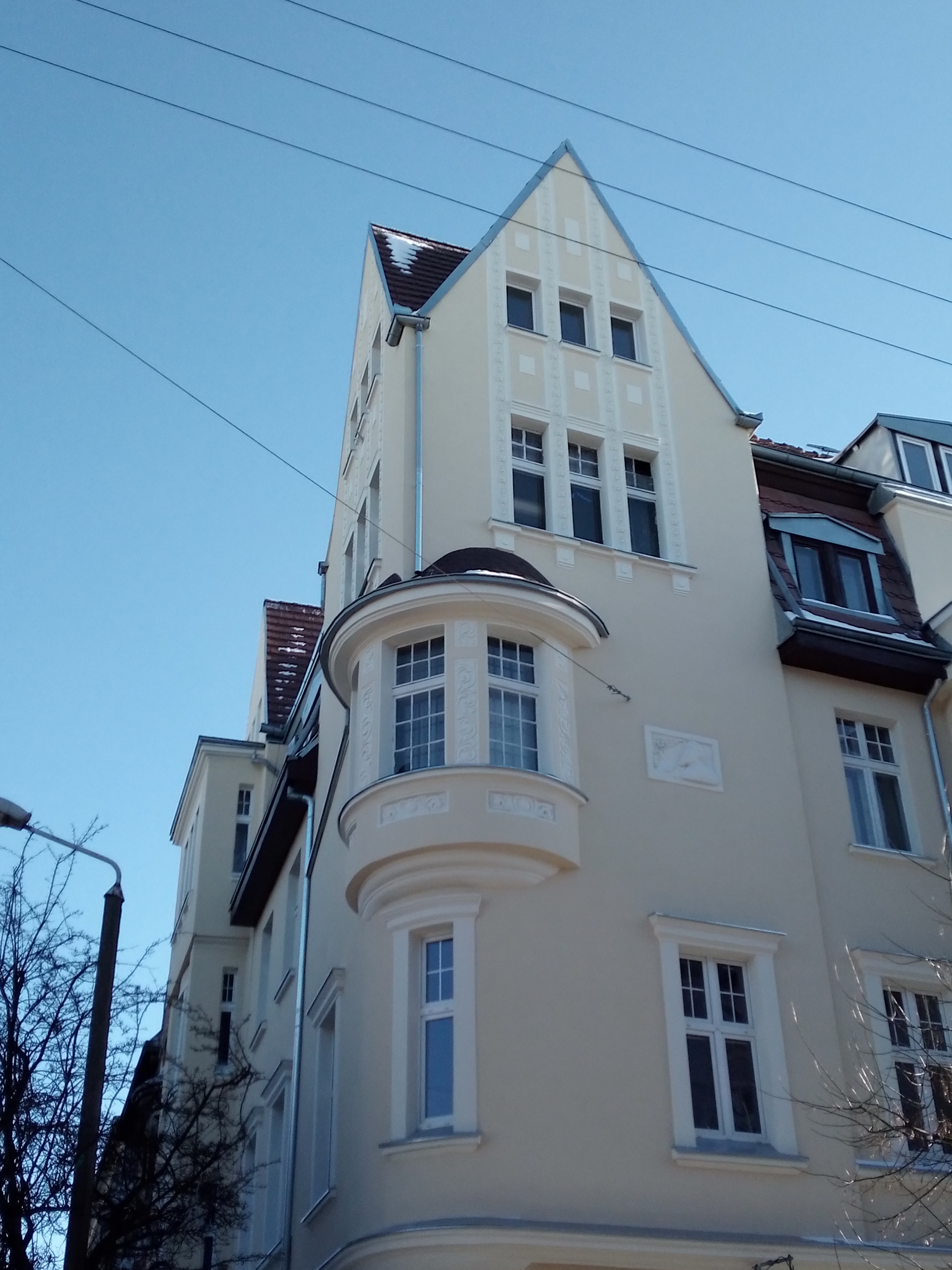
Detail of the bartizan

== See also ==
- Bydgoszcz
- Pomorska Street
- Henryka Sienkiewicza Street

== Bibliography ==
- Umiński, Janusz (1996). Bydgoszcz. Przewodnik (in Polish). Bydgoszcz: Regionalny Oddział PTTK "Szlak Brdy".
