= Ernst Mix Tenement =

Building Ernst Mix
- Polish: Kamienica Ernsta Mixa
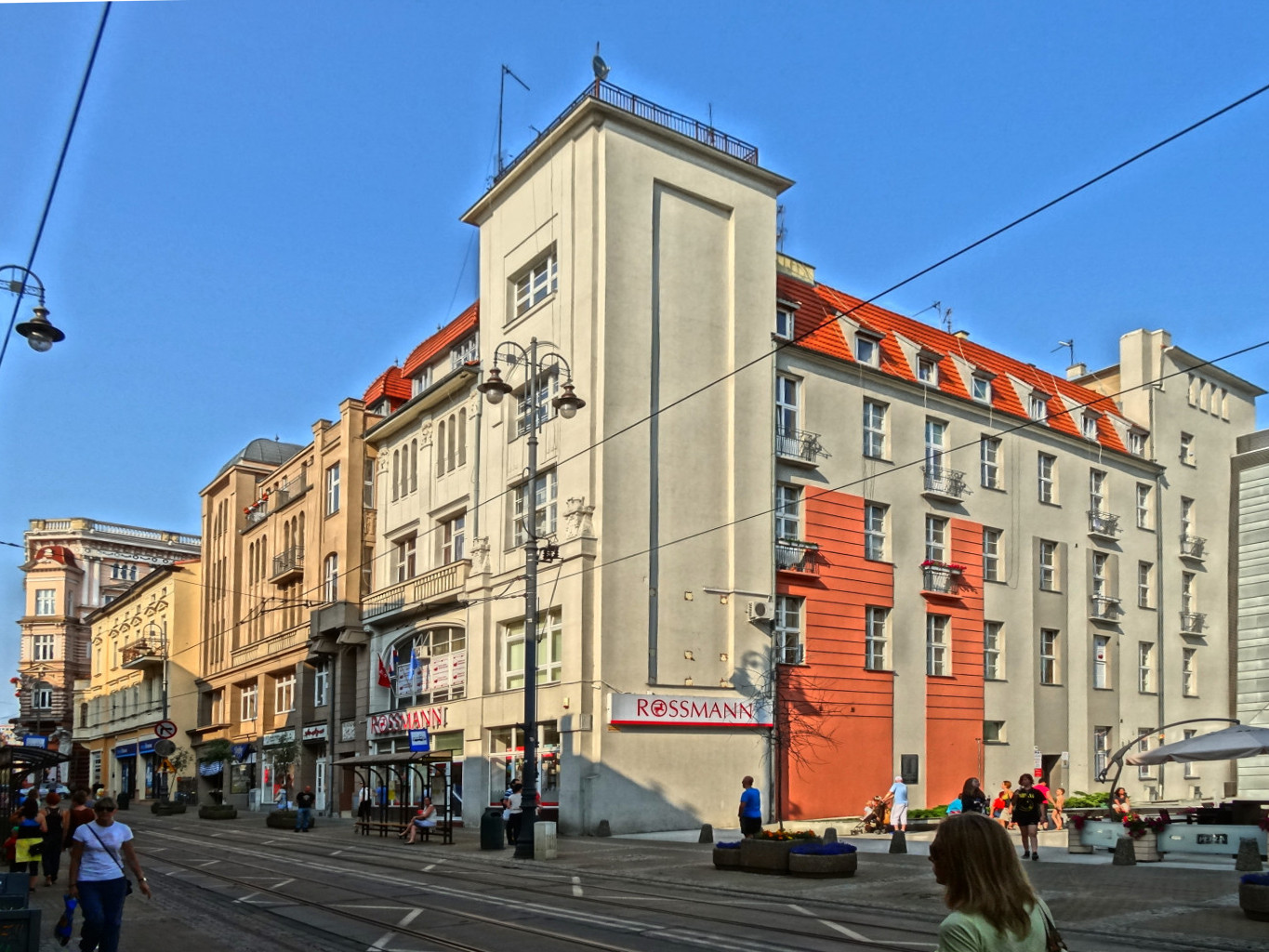
- Tenement Ernst Mix from Gdańska Street

General information
- Type: Tenement
- Architectural style: Modern architecture
- Location: Bydgoszcz, Poland
- Address: 10 Gdańska Street, Bydgoszcz, Poland
- Coordinates: 53°7′30″N 18°0′11″E
- Groundbreaking: 1863
- Completed: 1905
- Renovated: 1913-1914

Technical details
- Floor count: 5

Design and construction
- Architect(s): Fritz Weidner

The house Ernst Mix in Bydgoszcz is located at 10 Gdańska Street in Bydgoszcz.

== Location ==
The building stands on the eastern side of Gdańska Street, between Drukarnia shopping mall and Parkowa street.

== History ==
=== Origins ===
The building was erected in 1863 for Ernst Mix, a soap manufacturer, as a complex of two buildings.

In 1905, the building was expanded to the south with a residential annex in the Art Nouveau style, richly decorated with animal figures by architect Fritz Weidner, a German builder who came to Bydgoszcz at the end of the 19th century. Weidner building activity in the city was focused between 1896 and 1914. From 1912 onwards, he lived in the house he built for himself at 34 Gdańska street

In the same area, Fritz Weidner built houses at the following addresses:

- Thomas Frankowski Tenement at 28 Gdańska Street (1897);
- George Sikorski Tenement at 31 Gdańska Street (1906);
- Max Rosental Tenement at 42 Gdańska Street (1905);
- Ernst Bartsch tenement at 79 Gdańska Street (1898);
- Tenement at 3 Plac Wolności (1903).

From 1863 until World War II, Ernst Mix's company operated a soap and candle factory in this facility. The address then was 42 Danziger strasse.

In 1910, the owner adapted the building for commercial purposes. The two lower floors were then used as a Department Store called Modehaus Bromberg. A reconstruction took place between 1913 and 1914 under the supervision of Fritz Weidner.

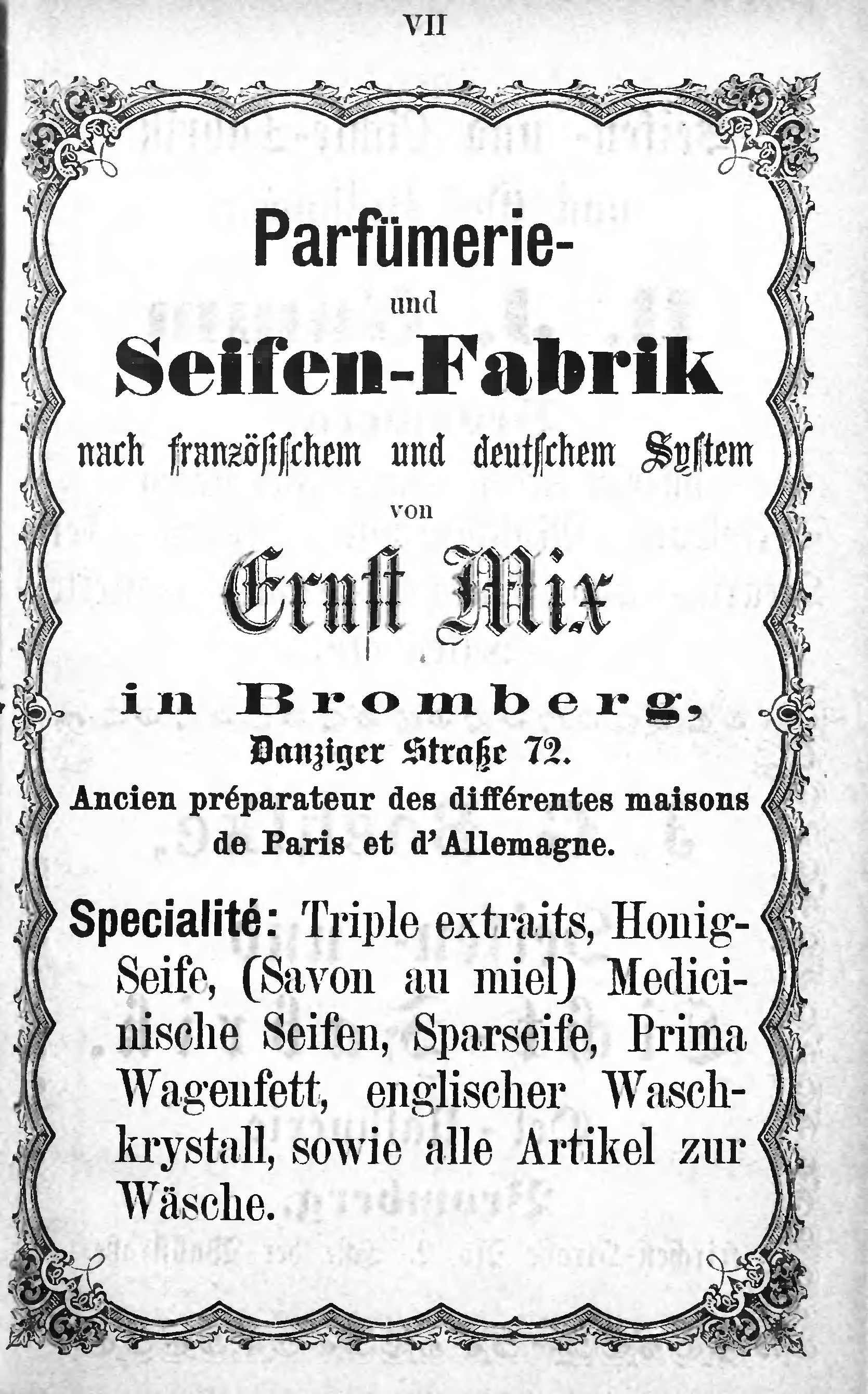
Advertisement for Mix Ernst products - 1869

=== "Kristal" Theatre ===
The final design of the front facade and the unification of the two houses was carried out after 1905 with the construction of the cinema theater "Kristal". "Krystal-Palast" started its performances in 1914, with a 750-seat capacity. The cinema facility operated until 2003, regularly changing name:

- Kristal in 1920;
- Cristal in the 1930s;
- Ufa Westpreussen during World War II;
- Pomorzanin between 1945 and 2003.

The theater could to host 478 people, 286 located up in a long gallery. Film screenings began on April 1, 1914. The entire facility, funded with loans from the Stadthagen Bank, was praised by companies Mixa, Tucholski, and Weidner.

=== Other outlets ===
During interwar period, a pub, Bar Angielski, was set up near the cinema where one could dance to the beat of live performances by Jazzband Orlowski. Another restaurant was also housed there at the same time, Zagloba, owned by M. Grabowski.

In 1921, the Poznański Bank Ziemian installed offices on Gdańska Street, and in 1944 the German Cashier of Bydgoszcz District (German: Sparkasse des Kreis Bromberg) was located in the building. In 1946, ground and first floor premises were allocated to the State Agricultural Bank (Polish: Państwowy Bank Rolny): renovation works were then supervised by architect Jan Kossowski. In 1948, the building was renovated.

In the postwar period the old factory premises housed the International Press and Books Club, and, since 1994, a club, Mózg.

At the beginning of 2017, the ensemble has been purchased by company Moderator Inwestycje, which planned to re-open there a theatre, with a scene.

== Architecture ==
The building was rebuilt in the style of early historical modernism by Fritz Weidner. The two lower floors keep large windows that were once part of a department store. The facade, originally adorned with art Nouveau solar motifs stuccoes, has lost most of them with following reconstructions (especially in 1948).

During the theater construction, reinforced concrete, a pioneering technology at the time, was used. Facades have been standardized and given the modern architecture style.

== Gallery ==
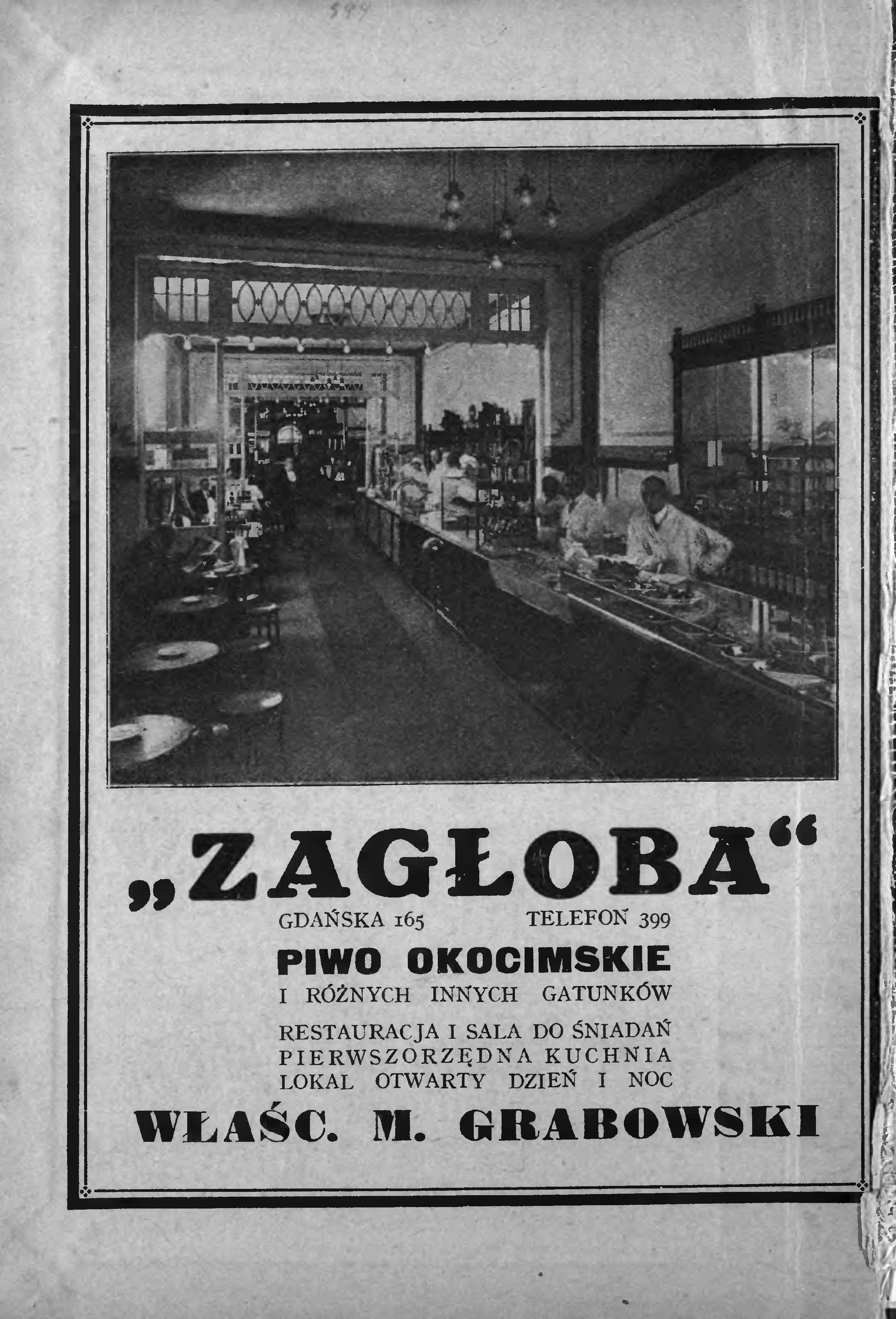
Advertisement for restaurant Zagloba, 1928

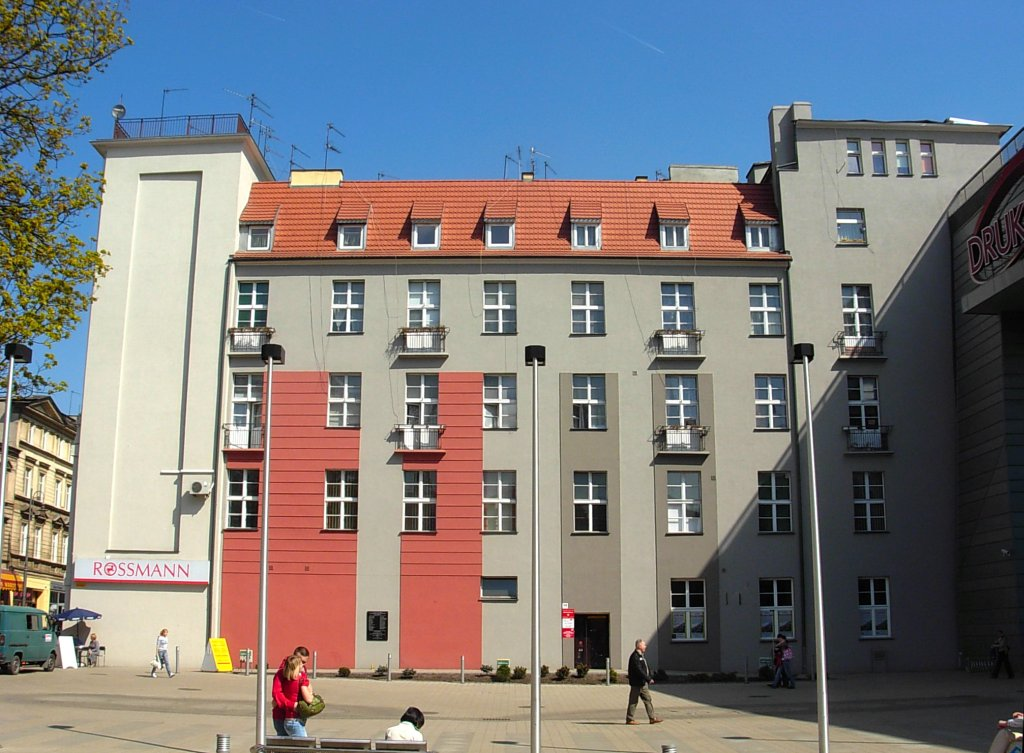
South facade

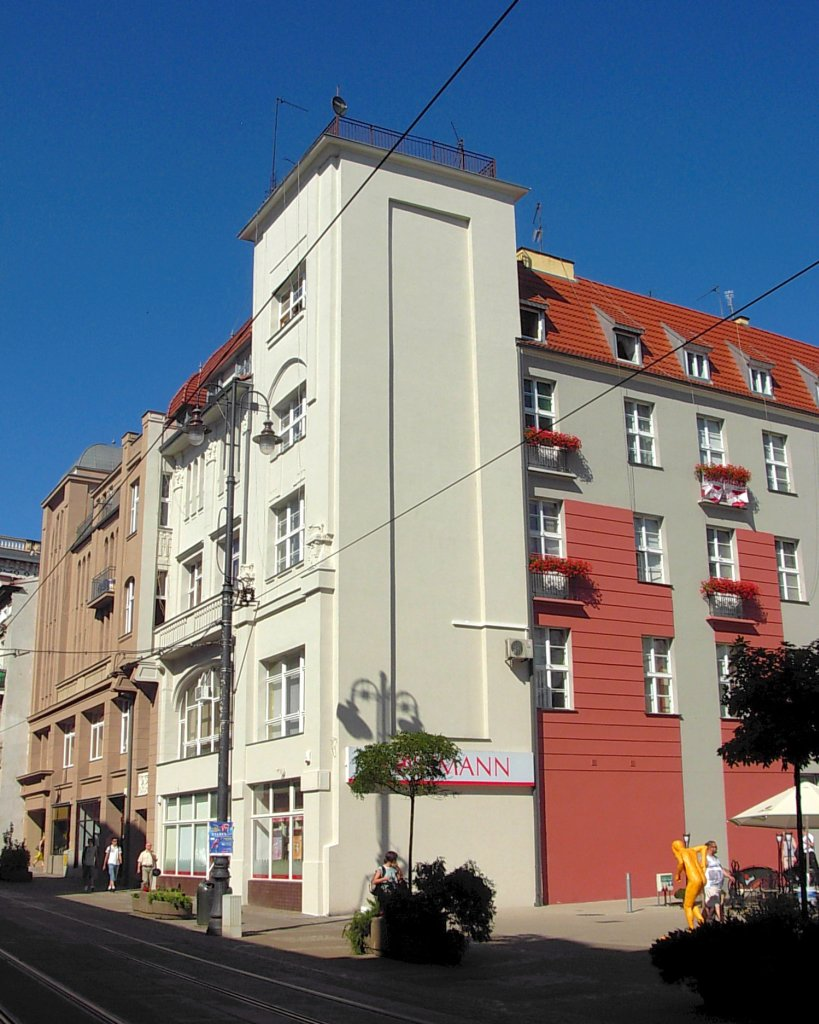
Corner

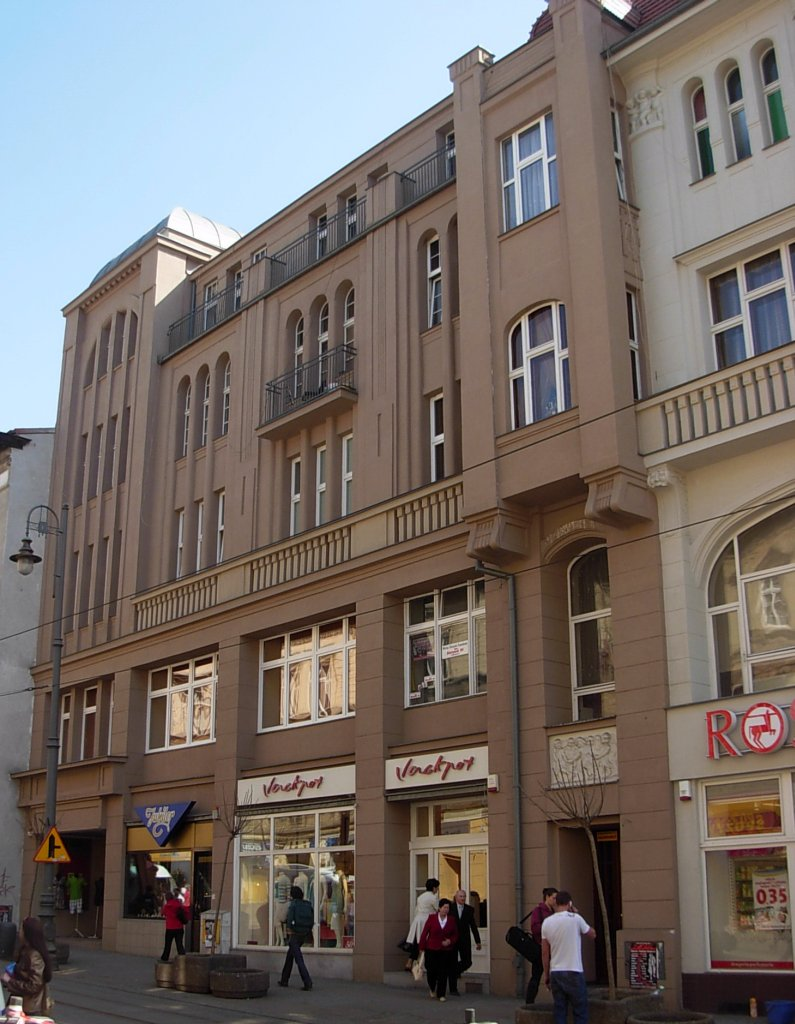
Frontage from Gdańska street

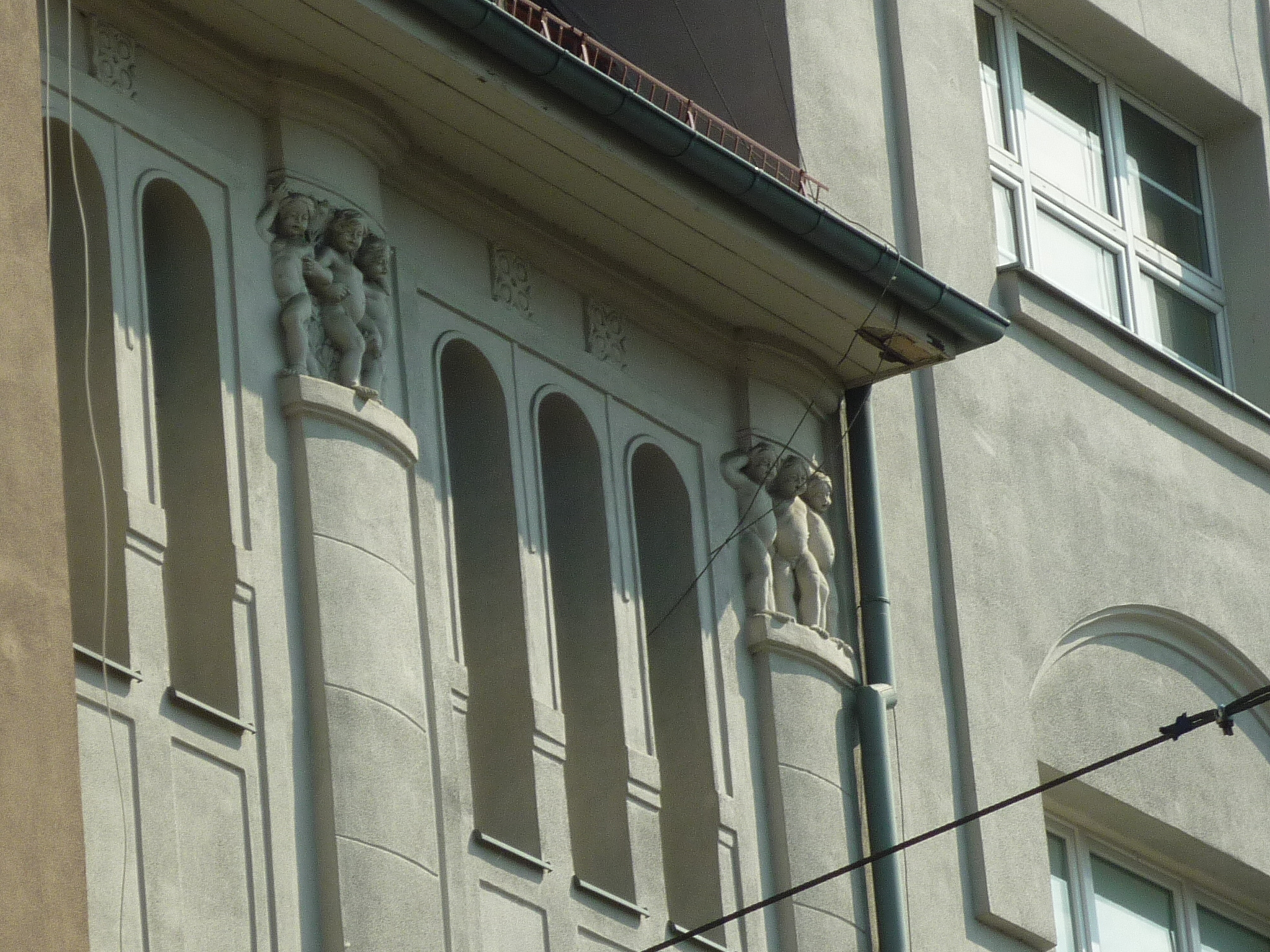
Detail of facade

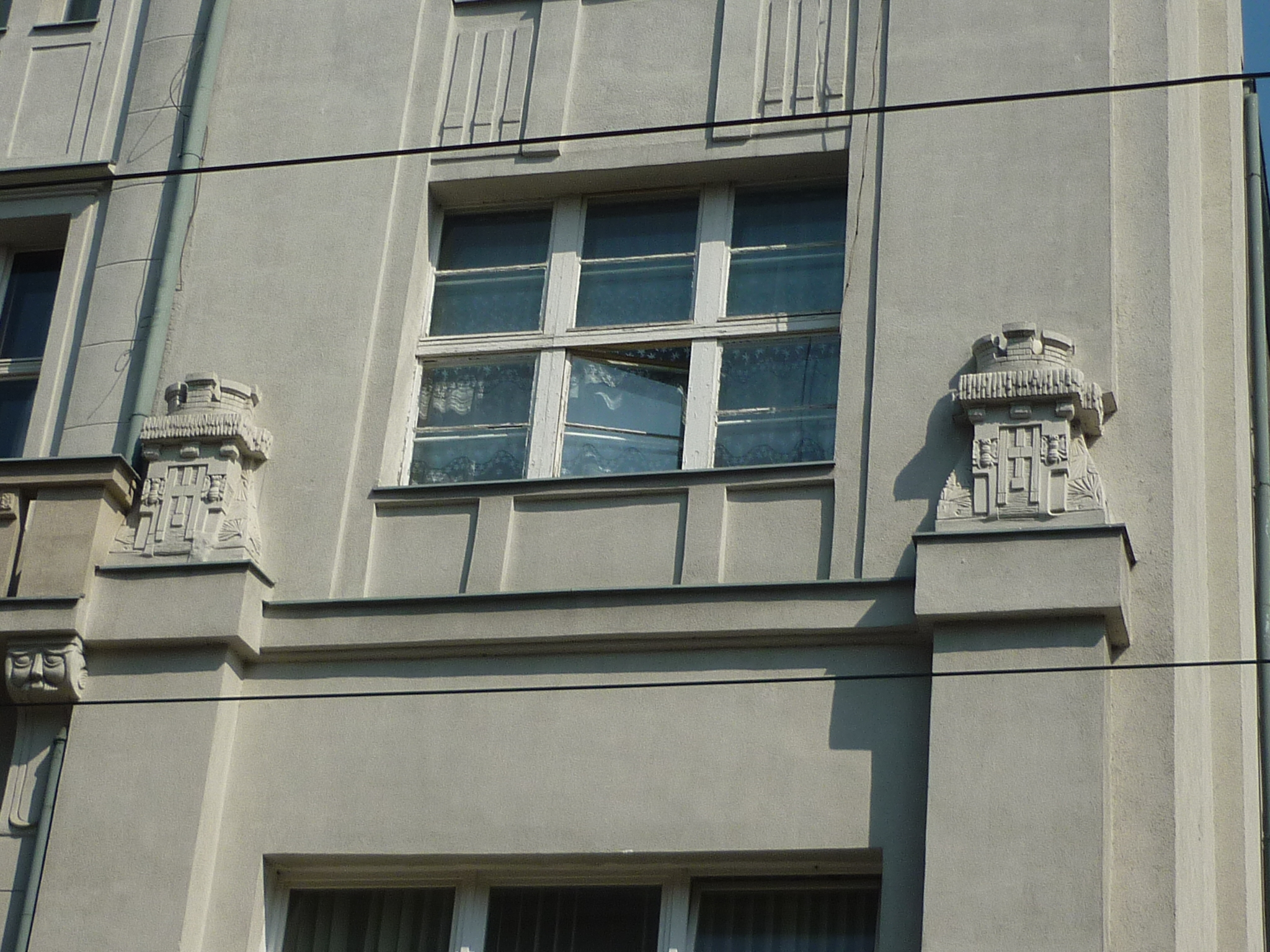
Detail of facade

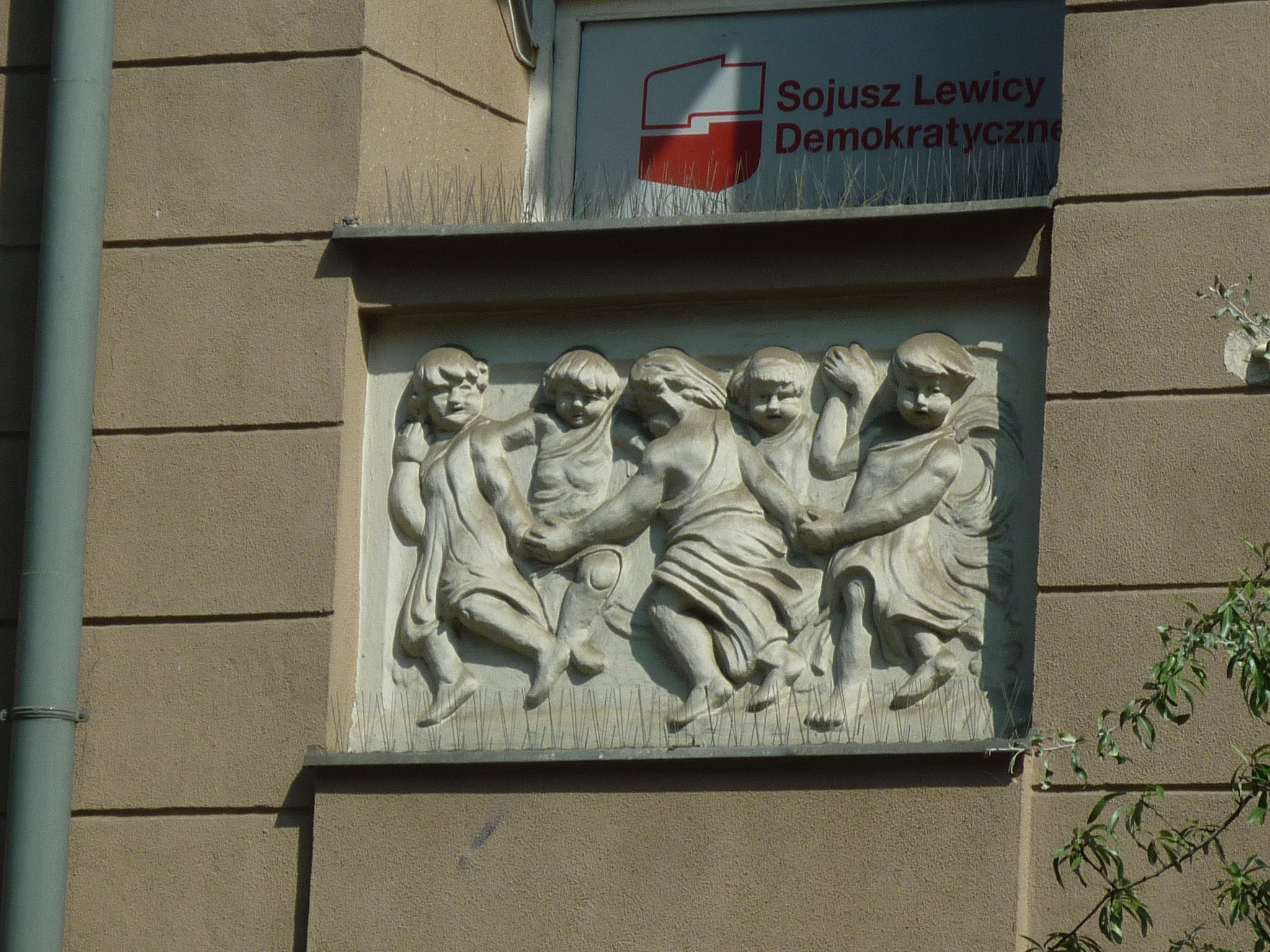
Detail of facade

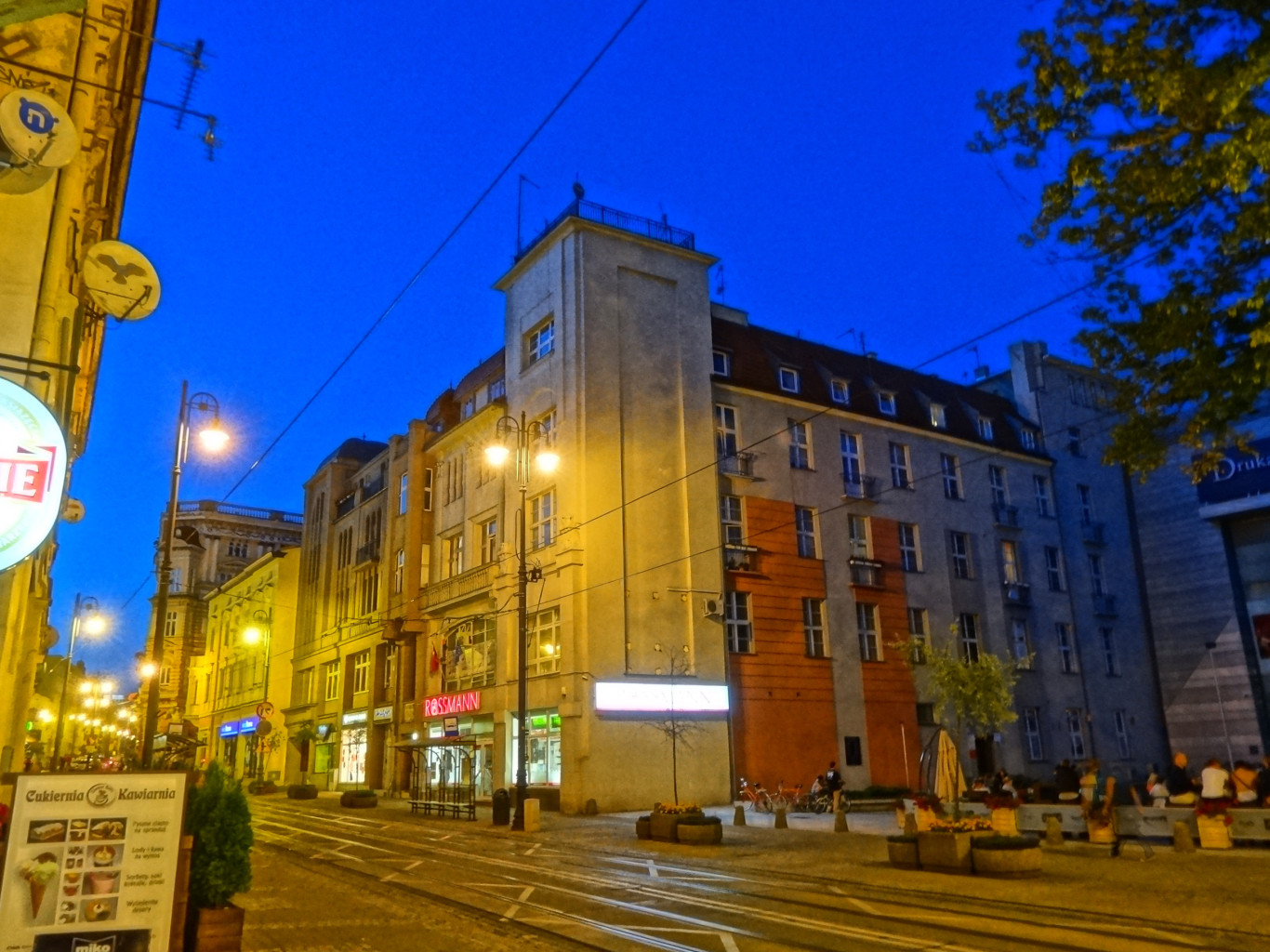
By night

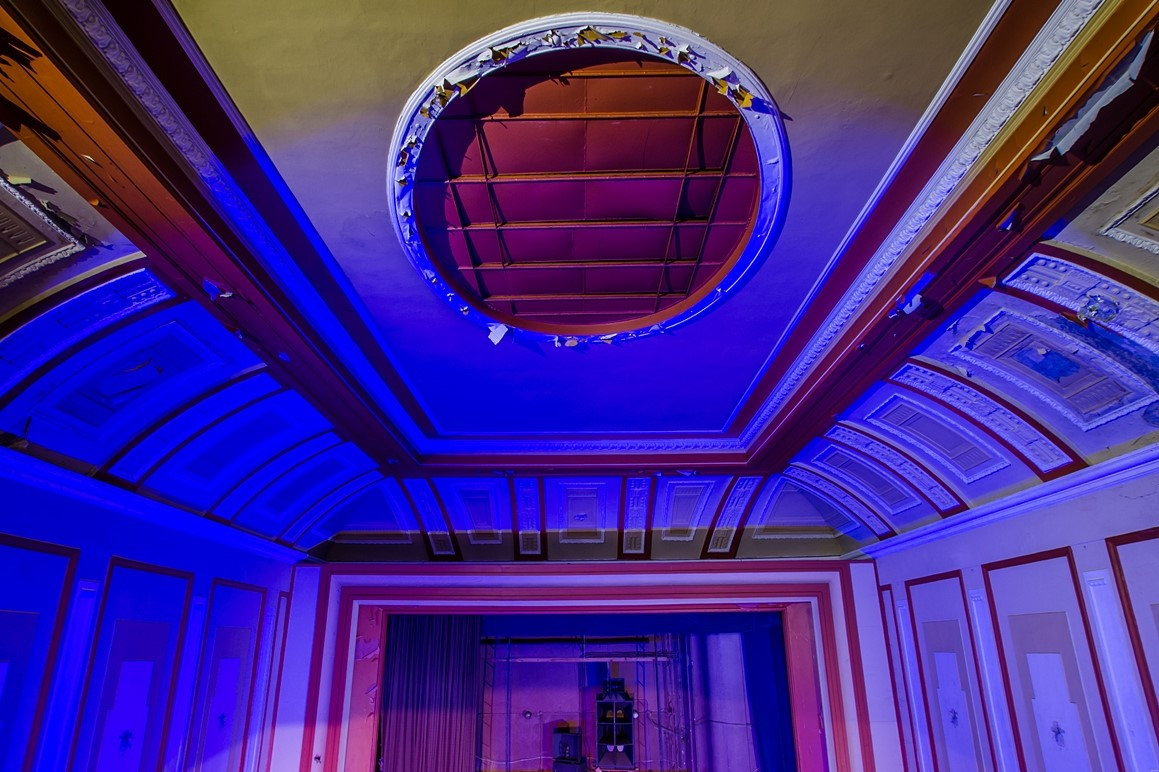
Interiors in 2017

== See also ==
- Bydgoszcz
- Gdanska Street in Bydgoszcz
- Fritz Weidner
- Jan Kossowski
- (in Polish) Club Mózg

== Bibliography ==
- (in Polish) Bręczewska-Kulesza Daria, Derkowska-Kostkowska Bogna, Wysocka A. (2003). Ulica Gdańska. Przewodnik historyczny. Bydgoszcz: Wojewódzki Ośrodek Kultury w Bydgoszczy. ISBN 9788386970100.
