= Fritz Weidner =

German architect (1863–1950)

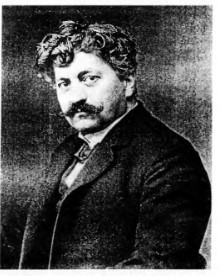
- Born: Ernst Friedrich Wilhelm Weidner; 13 March 1863; Vordamm, German Empire
- Died: 10 November 1950 (aged 87); Potsdam, East Germany
- Occupation: Architect
- Children: 5

Ernst Friedrich "Fritz" Wilhelm Weidner (13 March 1863 – 10 November 1950) was a German architect.

== Life ==
Weidner was born on 13 March 1863, in Vordamm (today part of Drezdenko, Poland). His father, Julius, from Bielefeld, was the head of the railway station. His mother, Antoni Marie Augusta (née Herold), was the daughter of Friedrich Herold, a local masonry master, as well as the mayor of Driesen (Drezdenko). Fritz spent his childhood and early youth in a family home. He graduated from the local public school and later obtained the builder qualification by passing the masonry exam. He soon earned the right to work as a manager.

At the beginning of the 1880s, he moved to Berlin and lived there with his brother Ernst, also a construction technician. According to family letters, he had been studying architecture and painting at the Berlin Academy of Arts for several semesters. This reduced academic education was not enough to obtain the title of architect, therefore, Fritz Weidner presumably followed courses in other universities of the German capital. During these sessions, he met his future wife, Alice Goodson, an Englishwoman.

Alice was the daughter of Thomas Goodson and Emma (née Wats). Thomas, a London-born citizen, had been working in Berlin since 1859, as a city sanitary engineer. Alice was born in Berlin on 20 May 1867. Later he founded the company Thomas Goodson-Tiefbaufirma, offering engineering services in the field of underground constructions and plumbing installations. Fritz Weidner was rapidly employed at the Goodson company and there he took his first steps as a building designer.

== Working in Bromberg ==
In 1895, he arrived alone in Bromberg, where he worked as a manager of the local branch of the Goodson company which was contracted to supervise the construction of city sewerage network. Three years later, thanks to the thriving economic situation in Bromberg offering a profusion of career opportunities, he decided to settle in the city.

He brought his family and set up his own architecture office, while keeping his cooperation with his father-in-law. He was particularly active from 1896 to 1914. His studio took part in 90 investments: 25 were projects for new front houses, while the other works were related to rebuilding residential houses or erecting smaller constructions such as utility rooms (stables, garages, warehouses), fencing and parking lots. Most of the realizations were commissioned by private investors, mainly city rentiers, manufacturers, merchants or artisans.

His works are mainly concentrated in:

- Gdańska Street (9 edifices);
- Cieszkowskiego Street;
- Śniadeckich Street;
- Dworcowa Street;
- 20 January 1920 Street.

Three buildings were the result of housing cooperative funding (German: Wohnungsverein). They are located at 13/14, Cieszkowskiego Street, 3/5 Staszica Street and 1 Kołłątaja street. The latter was awarded as the most beautiful new building in 1912, in a competition organized by city authorities (together with Rudolf Kern's house at 20 January 1920 Street).

Weidner was at the origin of the first building in Bydgoszcz using reinforced concrete: designed by Berlin architect Otto Walther, it stands today at 15 Gdańska Street. His work also includes two large edifices in downtown district: the Mix Ernst tenement at 10 Gdańska Street and the Brandt Department Store at 4 Theatre square, today the local seat of Bank Pekao.

Fritz Weidner, at the beginning of the 20th century, turned to Landhaus style, evoking German mansions. He directed the creation of an ensemble of single-family houses in Bielawy, a suburban commune of Bydgoszcz. He also became involved in applying the Garden city movement to Bydgoszcz urban planning.

In December 1910, numerous deficiencies, such as building out of the limits, starting construction works without the reception of the raw building framework, not sticking to the initial blueprint, caused the city representatives in charge of construction policy to submit a request to the mayor to deprive Weidner of his professional rights to practice. Archived records on the case do not make it clear whether the threat was considered positively.

== Other activities ==
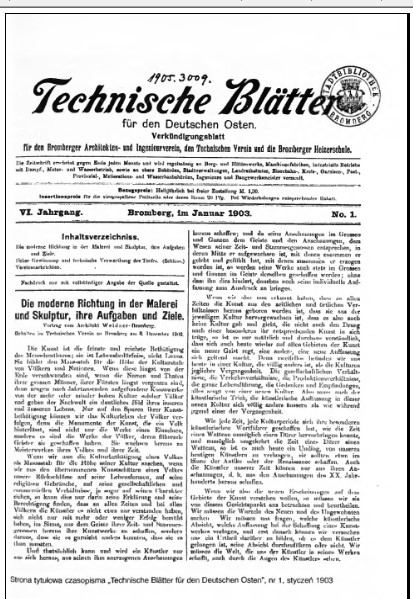
Front page of Technische Blätter, 1903

In addition to his professional activity, Fritz Weidner had a passion for journalism, especially to share new trends in art and architecture. In that sense, he was considered in Bromberg by his distinguished ambition to give a meaning to his artistic mission. He put a lot of effort into studying and disseminating knowledge about the latest trends in architecture and fine arts. His time witnessed a period of great changes in European architecture, in particular in the German Empire. These changes were the portents of a radical shift between traditional style and new ones, i.e. Art Nouveau and early modernism. Weidner, knowledgeable of these significant changes, clearly followed new artistic grounds.

He expressed his views in articles published in the journal Technische Blätter für den Deutschen Osten published by the Society of Technicians (German: Technisches Verein) created in 1857, subsumed into the German Society of Arts and Sciences in Bromberg. This association focused mostly on local construction entrepreneurs, architects, industrialists, engineering staff and craftsmen from various industries. Among his several writings (more than ten from 1903 to 1911), he wrote about Style, stylish, no style - from classic style to Secession, Böcklin and his art or Modern trends in painting and sculpture, their tasks and aims.

Weidner was an active member of the union's trade board, where he regularly gave lectures and readings about technical problems related to building design (e.g. lighting, water and sewage networks) or issues related to the theory of art and the concept of new artistic trends. From 1903 to 1906, he was the vice-chairman of this board. In 1907 he participated in publishing a book, Industry and Commerce in Bromberg (German: Industrie und Gewerbe in Bromberg) to celebrate the 50th anniversary of the Society of Technicians.

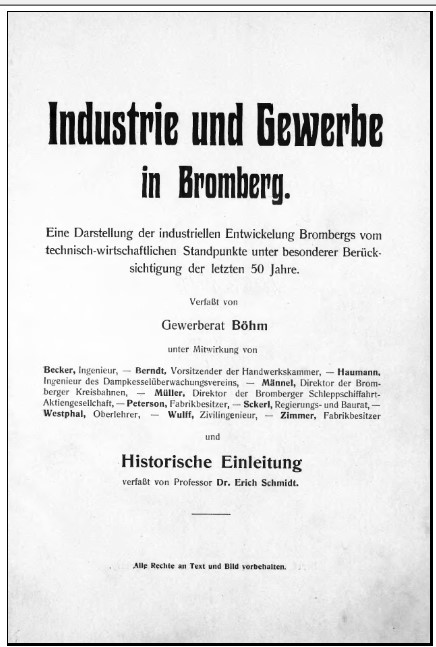
Title page of Industrie und Gewerbe in Bromberg, ca. 1907

== Style ==
Fritz Weidner's artistic style evolved from Eclecticism to Art Nouveau, through three stages.

When he arrived in Bromberg, his works were characterized by eclectic forms, with many Neo-Baroque decorative elements.

The second step of his stylistic maturation begun in 1897, with noticeable move towards Historicism where one can perceive a freedom of the planning, a lack of facade symmetry, as well as an abandonment of the stucco decoration, in favor of a decorative arrangement of different architectural elements (e.g. window shapes, loggias topped with arcades, bay windows, balconies).

Finally, in 1901, Weidner's work entered an Art Nouveau architectural phase, where he multiplied the use of various decorative motifs, playing with asymmetry on the frontages of his projects. Weidner's features related to Art Nouveau are mainly referring to the Viennese and German Secession, with a restrained, geometric approach, using organic motifs to a little extent, unlike what one can find in western countries Art Nouveau edifices.

He wrote in one of his articles: "A style is never used, it stood up and did not arise from the momentary mood of the artist or even a larger group of artists, but always develops logically, each time from specific temporal-spatial relations, each time as a result from the way of life of certain people, from the technical possibilities and material. That's why styles too need to change and develop further as people's lives (...)"

Quotation an other article: "There is nothing in art that is right or wrong. The truth is only and only on the conviction of artist's feelings, artist's approach. Art is no knowledge. The artist creates freely, by himself, with his sensation, his fantasy. If he creates according to established rules (...), he ceases to be an artist, he becomes a craftsman (...)"

Eventually, after 1905, he developed some liking for modernism, where stucco and basic decorative elements were reduced to a minimum on a facade.

== Life after 1914 ==
After the outbreak of World War I, Fritz Weidner volunteered for military service. Due to his age, he was not admitted to active service and was sent to the Reichsmarine, serving as an architect: he was stationed in Flanders to rebuild war damaged buildings on the coast. He then moved to Lyck (Ełk) and Lötzen (Giżycko), which suffered heavy destruction during the war in East Prussia.

In 1920, he returned to Bromberg, deciding to live in the city despite the exodus of the German population, linked to the return of Bydgoszcz to the Second Polish Republic. Despite his positive expectations, the unstable economic situation combined with the outflow of German capital was not favourable for city construction investments.

In 1937, he left Bydgoszcz with his wife and settled in Hamburg. Initially, they lived with their older son Hans, but moved in 1939 to their own flat. During World War II, Fritz and Alice moved to their daughter's house, Margarete Bublitz, in Wysoka, near Schneidemühl (Piła). Due to this, they eluded the allied air raids on 24–30 July 1943, when their Hamburg apartment was flattened.

In January 1945, Fritz and his wife escaped from the approaching soviet army invading eastern Germany. They travelled by harsh winter days (-18 °C), from Dramburg (Drawsko Pomorskie) to Potsdam, where they survived a last great air raid. In Potsdam, on 25 September 1950, the couple celebrated their diamond wedding anniversary. Fritz Weidner died on 10 October 1950 and was buried in Teltow district cemetery.

== Personal life ==
Fritz Weidner married an English woman, Alice Jessie Goodson, on 25 September 1890.

They had five children: Charlotte, Erna, Hans, Margarete and Walter. In Bromberg, the family lived at 73 Dworcowa Street, in the flat which initially belonged to Friedrich Herold, grandfather of Fritz Weidner. Alice Weidner died on 2 December 1957 in Lengerich, Westphalia.

== Works in Bromberg ==
Main preserved buildings by Fritz Weidner in Bydgoszcz
Year	Edifice	Remarks	Picture
January 1895	Villa Fritz Heroldt	Located at 119 Gdańska Street. Earliest surviving project realized by Fritz Weidner.	
September 1895	Tenement House	Located at 73 Dworcowa Street, Fritz Weidner lived there with his family.	
October 1895	Hermann Dyck Villa	Located at 25 Królowej Jadwigi Street	
August 1897	Carl Bradtke tenement	Located at 91 Gdańska Street.	
1897	Thomas Frankowski Tenement	Located at 28 Gdańska Street.	
August 1897	Tenement house	Located at 35 Pomorska Street.	
September 1898	Vincent Krause's house	Located at 22 Cieszkowskiego Street. Vincent Krause was a wealthy local craftsman.	
September 1898	Ernst Bartsch tenement	Located at 79 Gdańska Street.	
August 1901	Carl Bartz House	Located at 14 Marchinkowskiego street, it houses today the city cultural center (Polish: Miejskie Centrum Kultury).	
July 1902	Tenement House	Located at 13/15 Cieszkowskiego Street. Order from a housing cooperative (German: Wohnungsverein).	
November 1902	Carl Mauwe Tenement	Located at 29 Śniadeckich Street. Carl Mauwe was a city photograph.	
February 1903	Richard Schrammke Tenement	Located at 6 Wileńska Street.	

Main preserved buildings by Fritz Weidner in Bydgoszcz
Year	Edifice	Remarks	Picture
September 1903	Carl Ruckenschuch Tenement	Located at 3 Plac Wolności.	
October 1903	Tenement Houses	Located at 3/5 Staszica Street. Order from a housing cooperative (German: Wohnungsverein).	
May 1905	Max Rosenthal Tenement	Located at 42 Gdańska Street.	
July 1905 and June 1913	Mix Tenement	Located at 10 Gdańska Street. Arno Ernst Mix was a soap manufacturer.	
August 1905	Moritz Ephraim tenement	Located at 2 Śniadeckich Street.	
October 1906	Walther Minge tenement	Located at 34 Gdańska Street, it represents the scenic trend.	
October 1907	Oskar Unverferth House	Located at 3 20 Stycznia 1920 Street. Oskar Unverferth ran a furniture factory.	
November 1909	Otto Pfefferkorn tenement	Located at 12 Dworcowa Street. Otto Pfefferkorn, a furniture factory manager, used the ground floor as a show-room.	
December 1909	Tenement House	Located at 1 Kołłątaja street. Order from a housing cooperative (German: Wohnungsverein).	
March 1910	Tenement House	Located at 19 20 Stycznia 1920 Street, the commissioner was Richard Schrammke, also owner at Wileńska Street 6.	
February 1911	Brandt Department Store	Located at 4 Theatre square, the commissioner was Max Zweininger, owner of a famous hat manufactory who was living at 2 Focha street.	

== See also ==
- Bydgoszcz
- Bydgoszcz Architects (1850-1970s)
- List of Polish people

== Bibliography ==
- Błażejewski Stanisław, Kutta Janusz, Romaniuk Marek (1994). Bydgoski Słownik Biograficzny. Tom VII (in Polish). Bydgoszcz: Bydgoszcz Kujawsko-Pomorskie Tow. Kulturalne. pp. 115, 118. ISBN 8385327703.
- Jastrzębska-Puzowska, Iwona (1998). Poglądy artystyczne i twórczość bydgoskiego architekta Fritza Weidnera cz. I. Materiały do Dziejów Kultury i Sztuki Bydgoszczy i Regionu. zeszyt 3 (in Polish). Bydgoszcz: Pracownia Dokumentacji i Popularyzacji Zabytków Wojewódzkiego Ośrodka Kultury w Bydgoszczy. p. 44.
- Jastrzębska-Puzowska, Iwona (2000). Poglądy artystyczne i twórczość bydgoskiego architekta Fritza Weidnera cz. II. Materiały do Dziejów Kultury i Sztuki Bydgoszczy i Regionu. zeszyt 5 (in Polish). Bydgoszcz: Pracownia Dokumentacji i Popularyzacji Zabytków Wojewódzkiego Ośrodka Kultury w Bydgoszczy. pp. 37–47.
- (in German) Iwona Jastrzębska-Puzowska (Bydgoszcz/Bromberg) - Der Bromberger Architekt Fritz Weidner – Kunstauffassung und Werk
