= Villa Fritz Heroldt =

Villa Fritz Heroldt in Bydgoszcz
- Polish: Willa Fritza Heroldta w Bydgoszczy
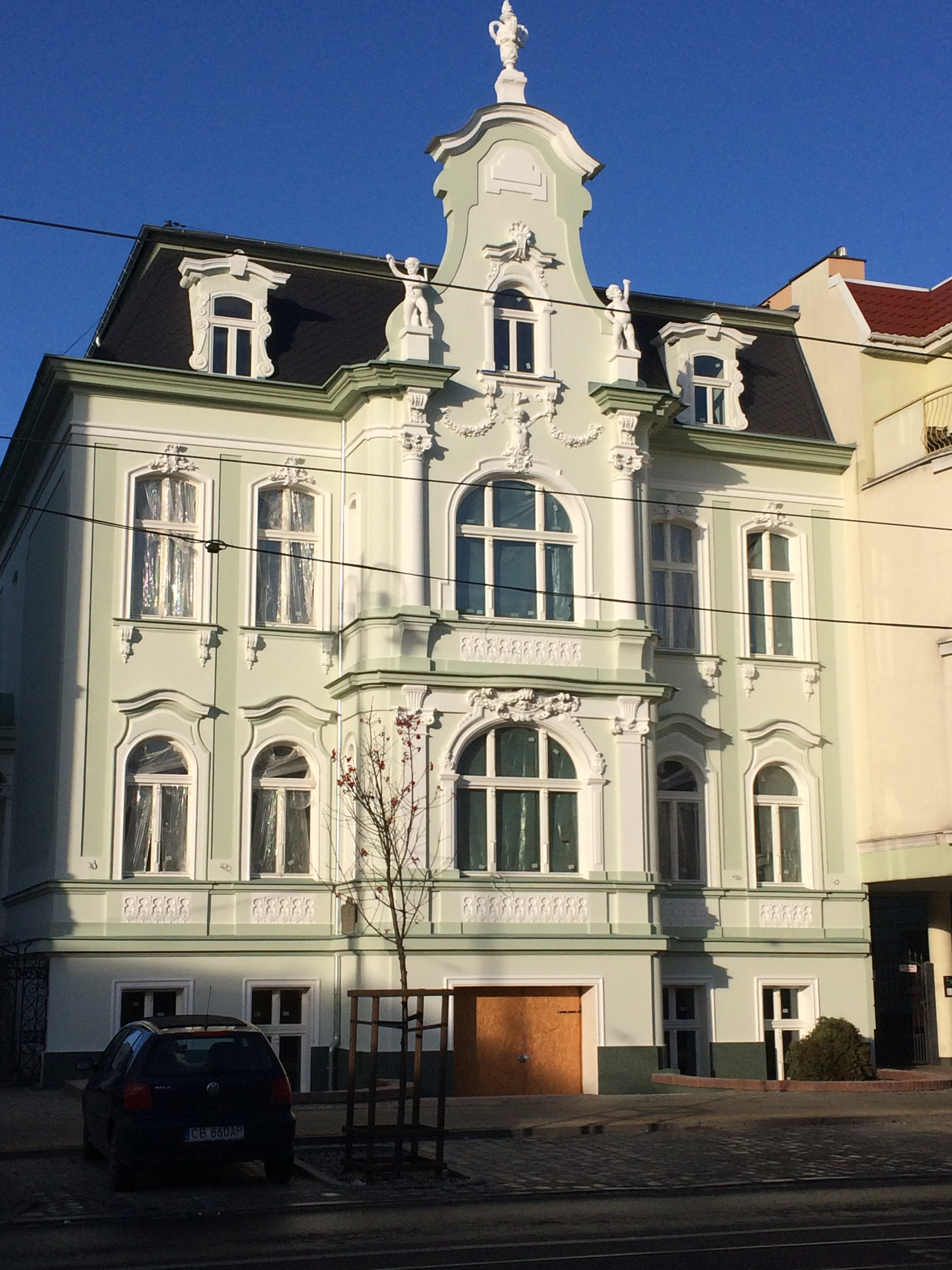
- View from Gdanska street
- Interactive map of the Villa Fritz Heroldt in Bydgoszcz area

General information
- Type: Villa
- Architectural style: Eclecticism & Neo-baroque
- Classification: Nr.601324 - Reg. A/1097/1-2, 15 April 1994
- Location: 119 Gdanska street, Bydgoszcz, Poland, Poland
- Coordinates: 53°8′6″N 18°0′44″E
- Construction started: 1895
- Completed: 1896
- Client: Fritz Heroldt
- Owner: Firm Agnat

Technical details
- Floor count: 4

Design and construction
- Architect: Fritz Weidner

The Villa Fritz Heroldt is a historical house in downtown Bydgoszcz. It is registered on the Kuyavian-Pomeranian Voivodeship Heritage List.

== Location ==
The building stands on western side of Gdańska Street at Nr.119, between Chocimskiego street and Artyleryjski street.

== History ==
The building was built between 1895 and 1896 for Emilia and Fritz Heroldt, a couple of rentiers. At the time, the address was 67 Danzigerstrasse, Bromberg. They lived there until 1899. Fritz Heroldt had also a tenement built in 1896 at 71 Dworcowa Street by Fritz Weidner.

At the beginning of the 20th century Antoni Chołoniewski (1872–1924) lived in the villa. He was a journalist and Polish national activist who wrote the Spirit of Polish History (Polish: Duch dziejów Polski). As a remembrance, a plaque has been placed on the facade.

During PRL times, the villa housed the Civic Militia Command (Polish: Milicja Obywatelska).

Later a school for girls has been established there, then a language school.

Since April 2017, an internet company, Agnat, has moved its headquarters into the premises. Prior to the installation, the firm led an external and internal complete renovation of the villa, based on heritage agency recommendations.

== Architecture ==
It is one of the first realization of Berliner architect Fritz Weidner, a few years after his arrival in Bydgoszcz.

The elevation is decorated with characteristic Neo-Baroque ornaments:

- puttoes figures
- garlands and friezes
- volutes
- caryatids

The thorough restoration funded by the company Agnat spanned from 2014 to April 2017. Renovations were conducted under the close supervision of the urban conservator of monuments. The coloring of the facade is similar to the original, all decorations: garlands, scrolls, statues of plump angels have been meticulously renewed.

Interiors are likewise, with wooden windows, reconstructed door frames, wooden columns, roof truss, curving staircase with handmade wooden balustrade scenic.

The building has been put on the Kuyavian-Pomeranian Voivodeship Heritage List (Nr.601324, Reg. A/1097/1-2) on April 15, 1994.

== Gallery ==
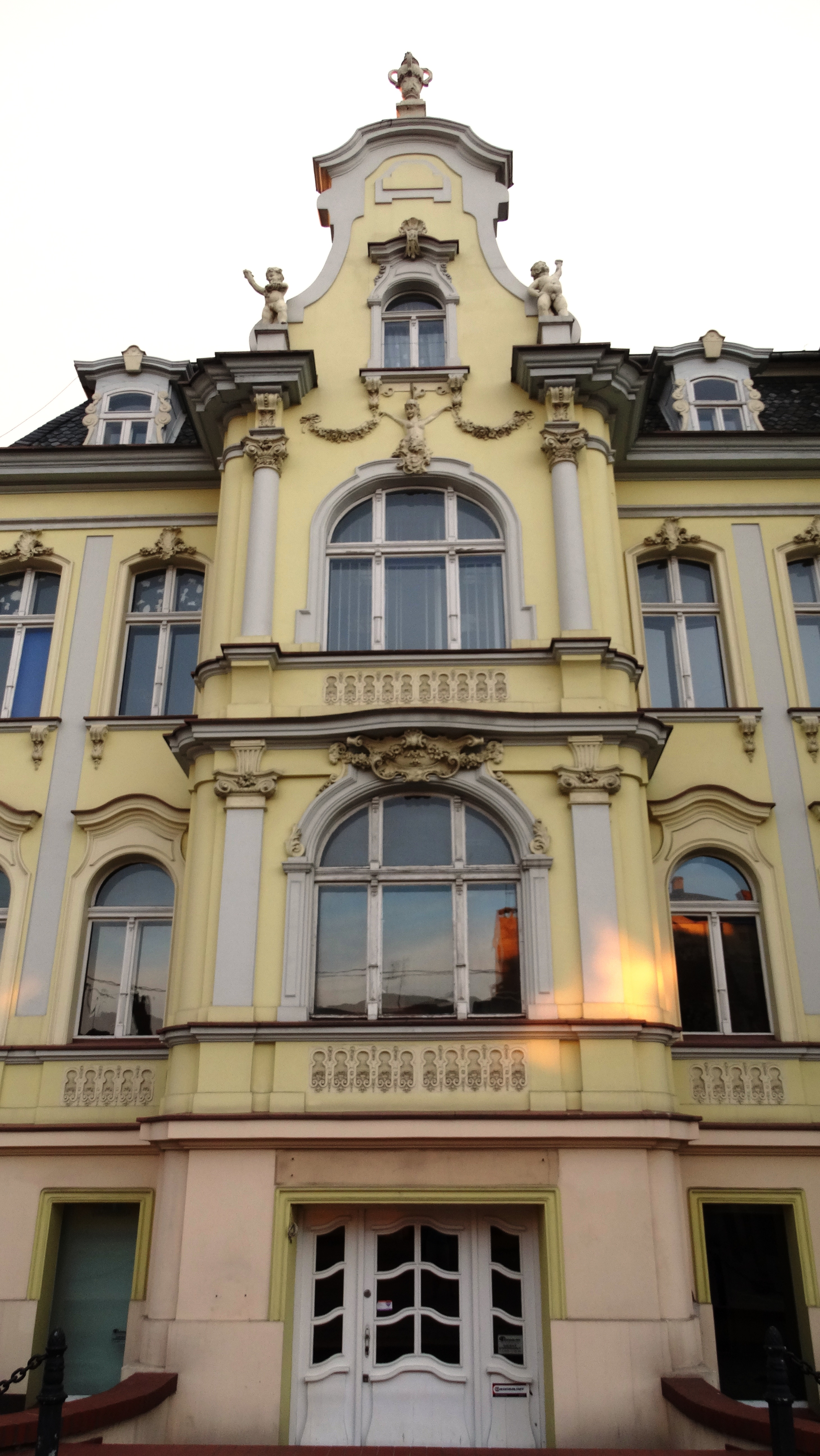
Facade detail

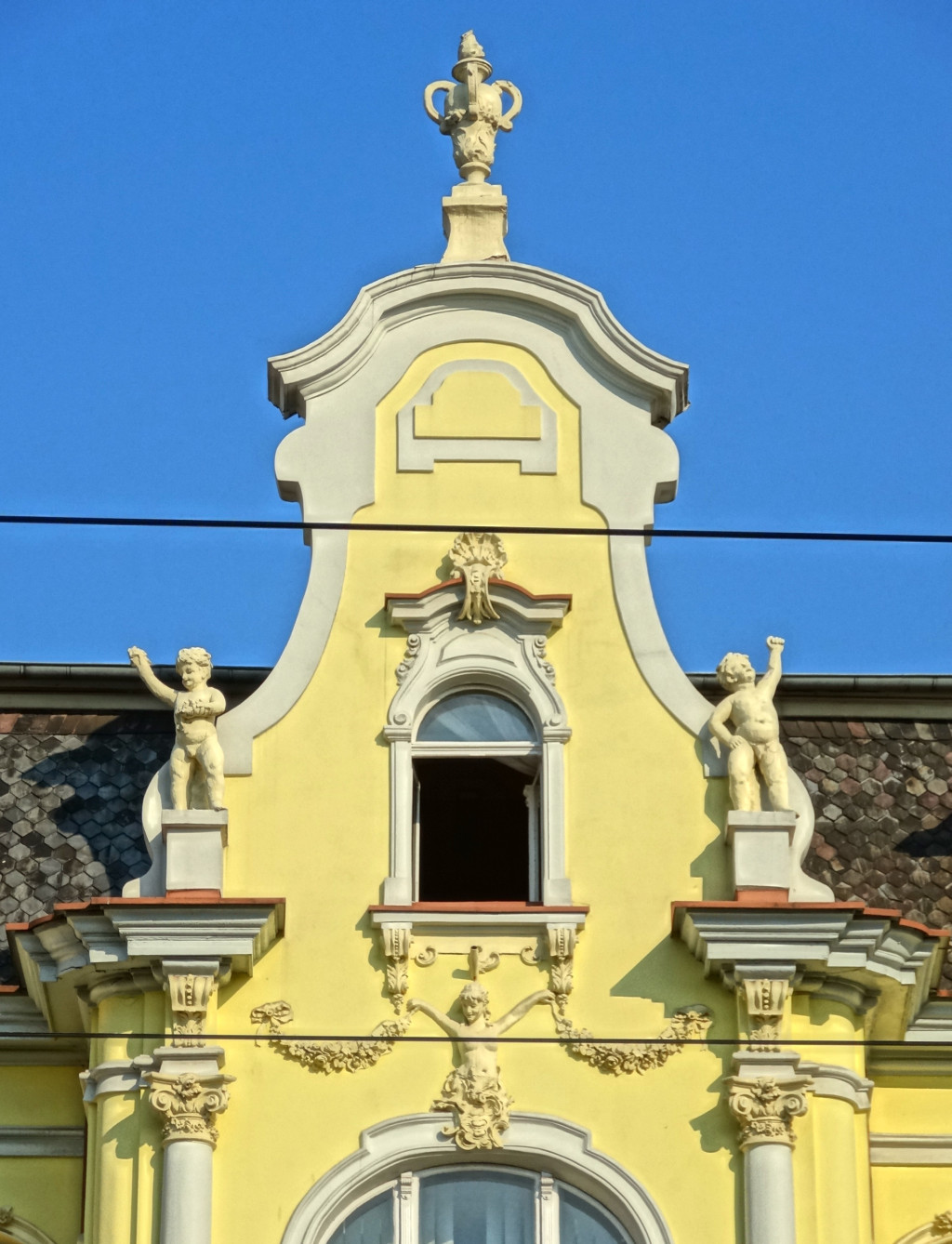
Gable with puttoes

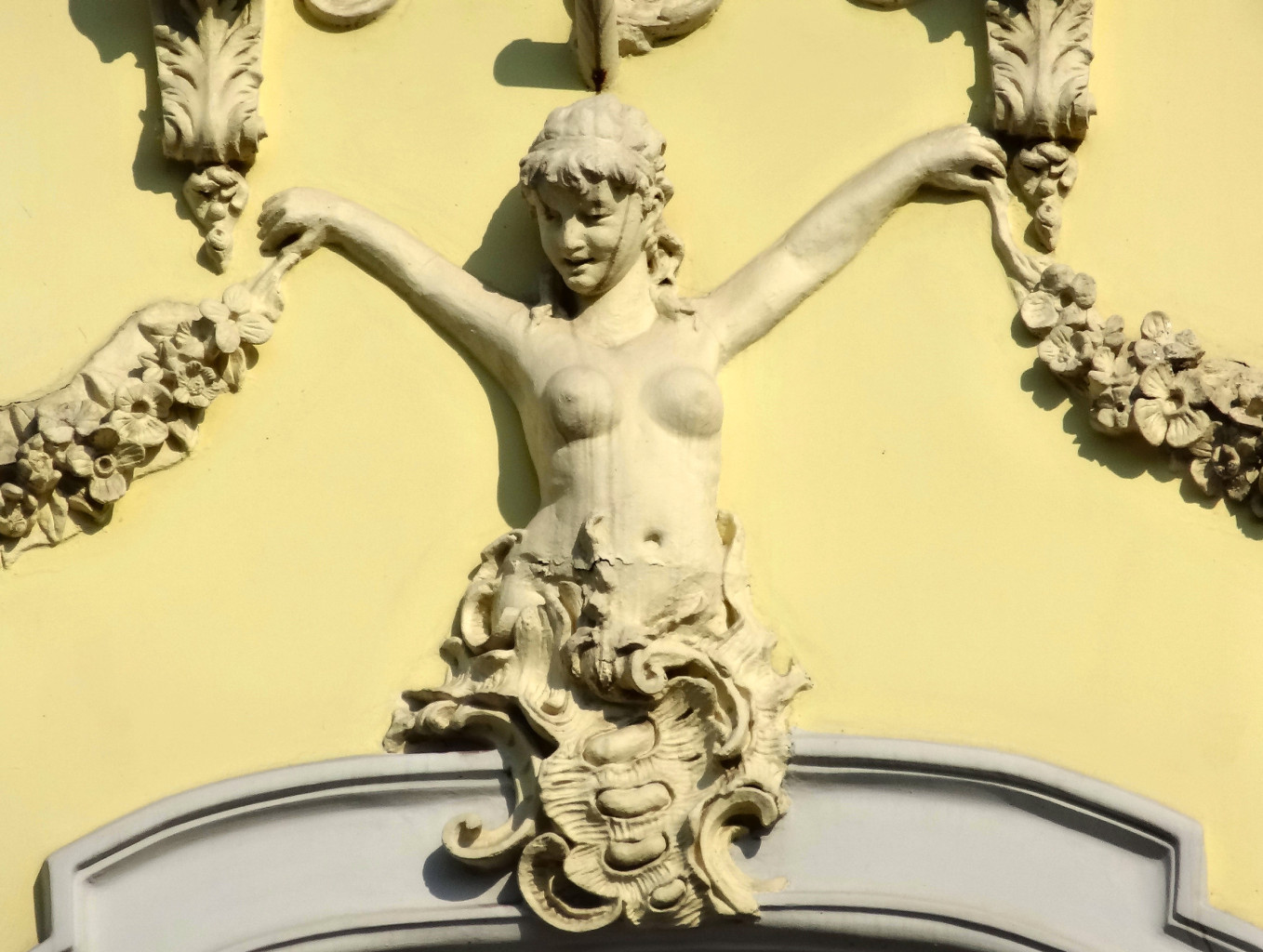
Caryatid

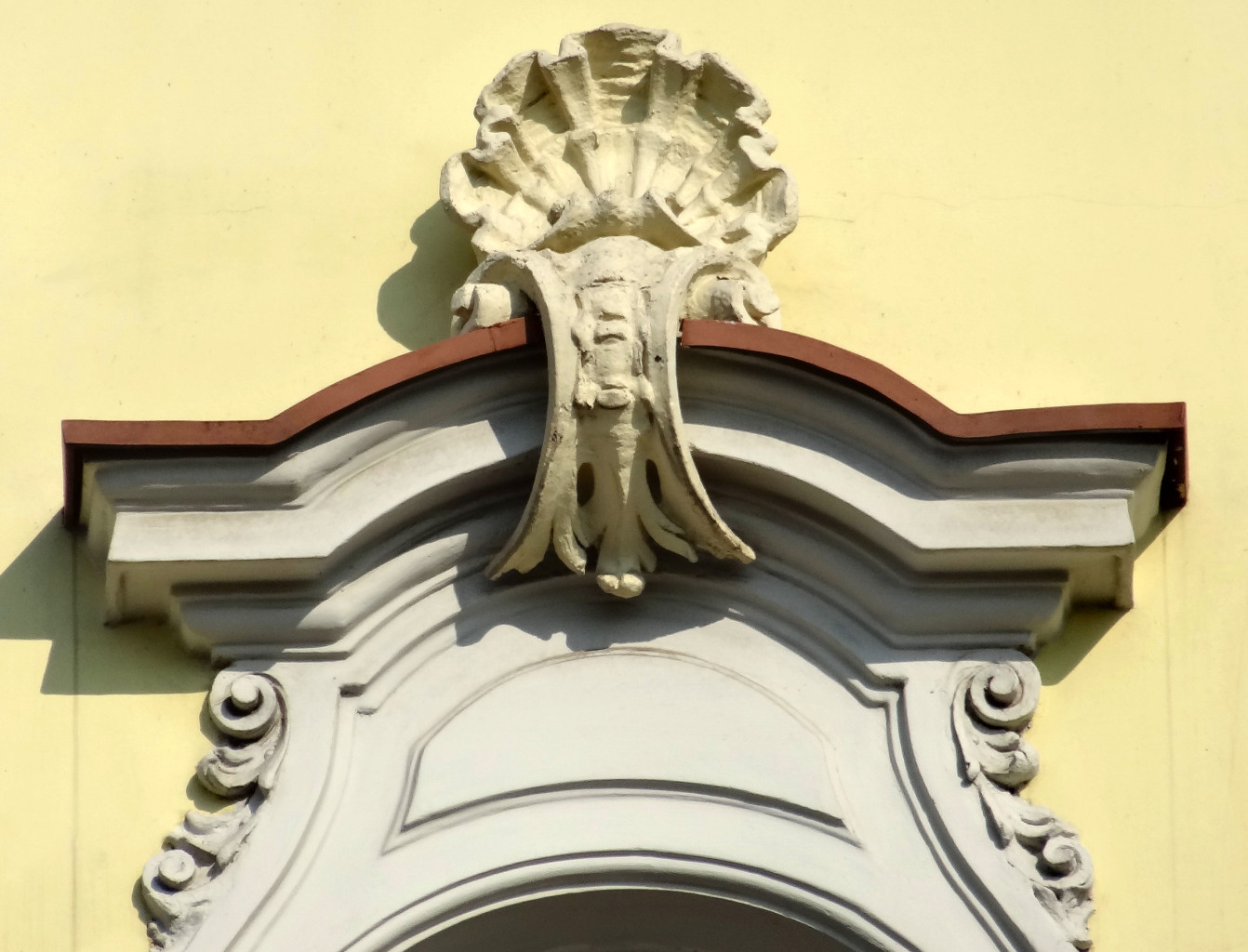
Volute

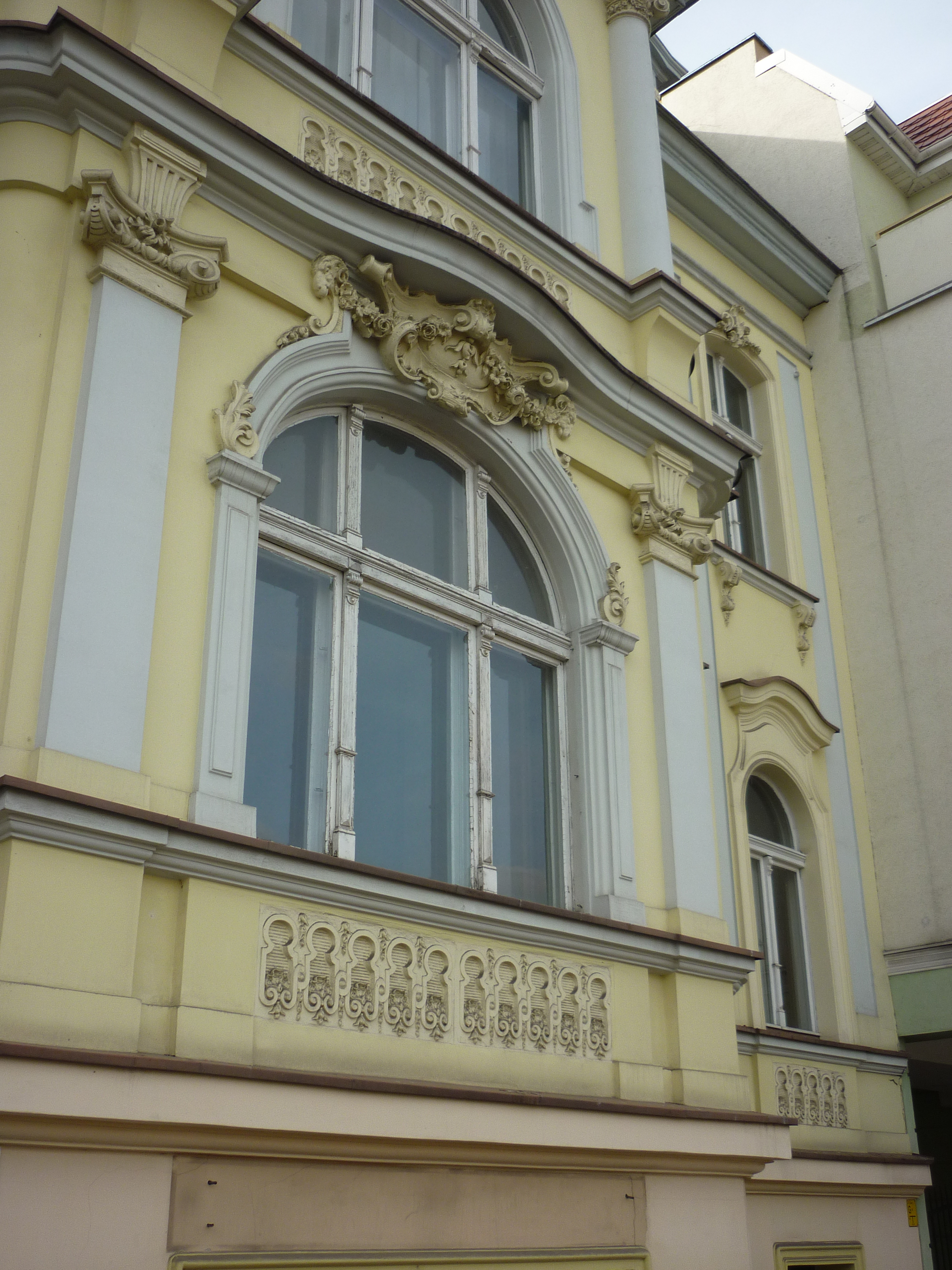
Ornamented facade

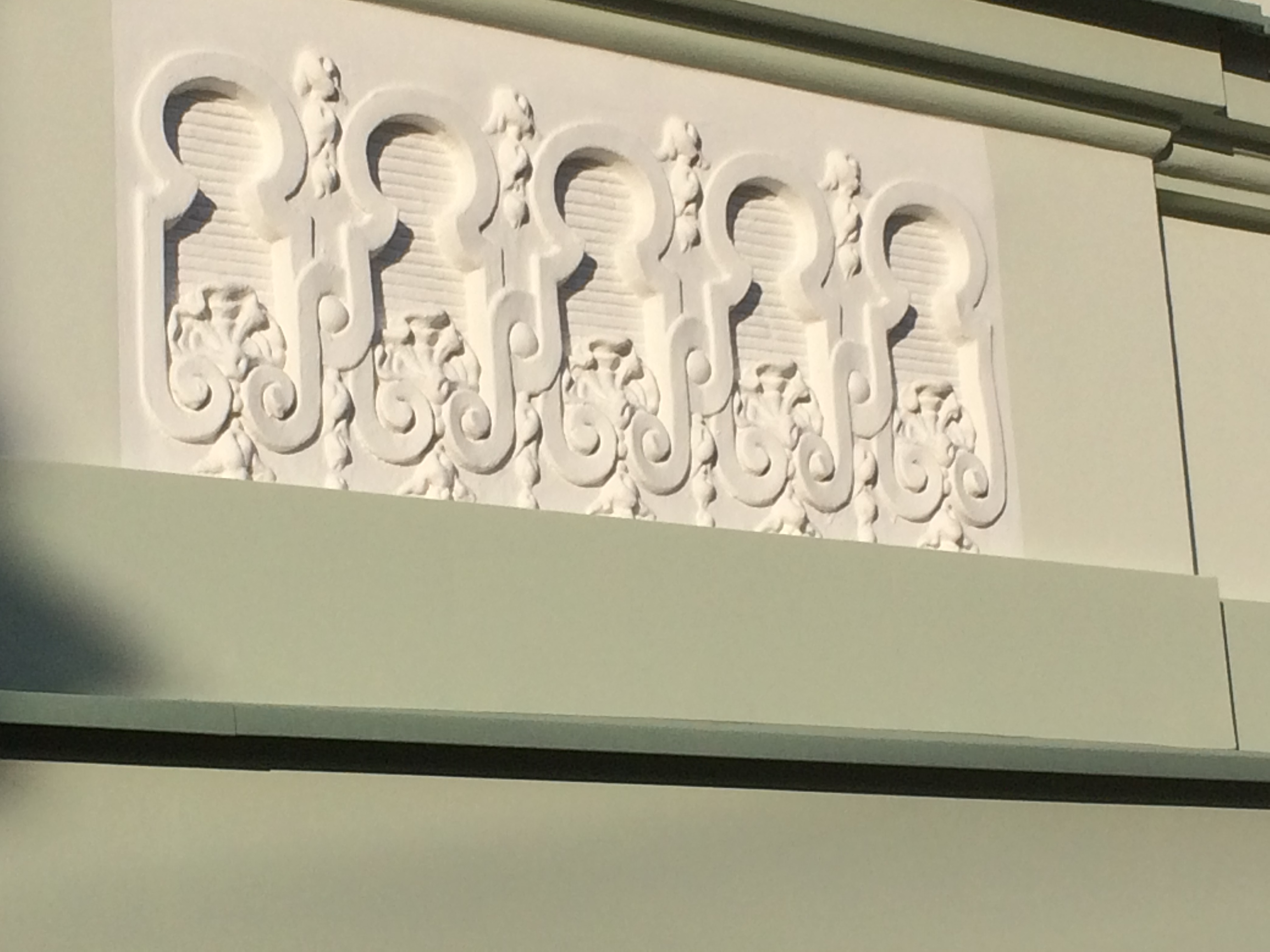
Motif detail

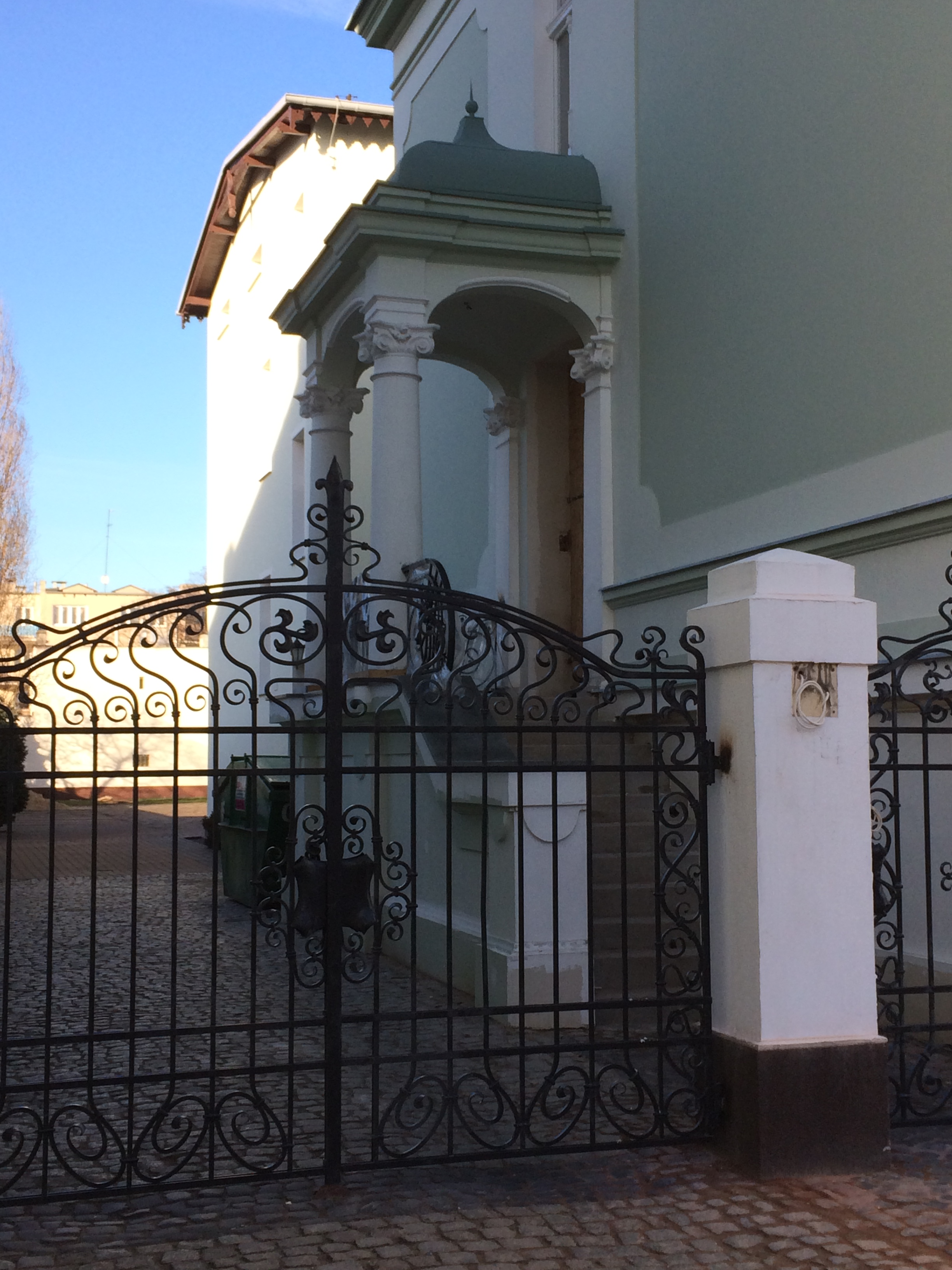
Gate and side entry

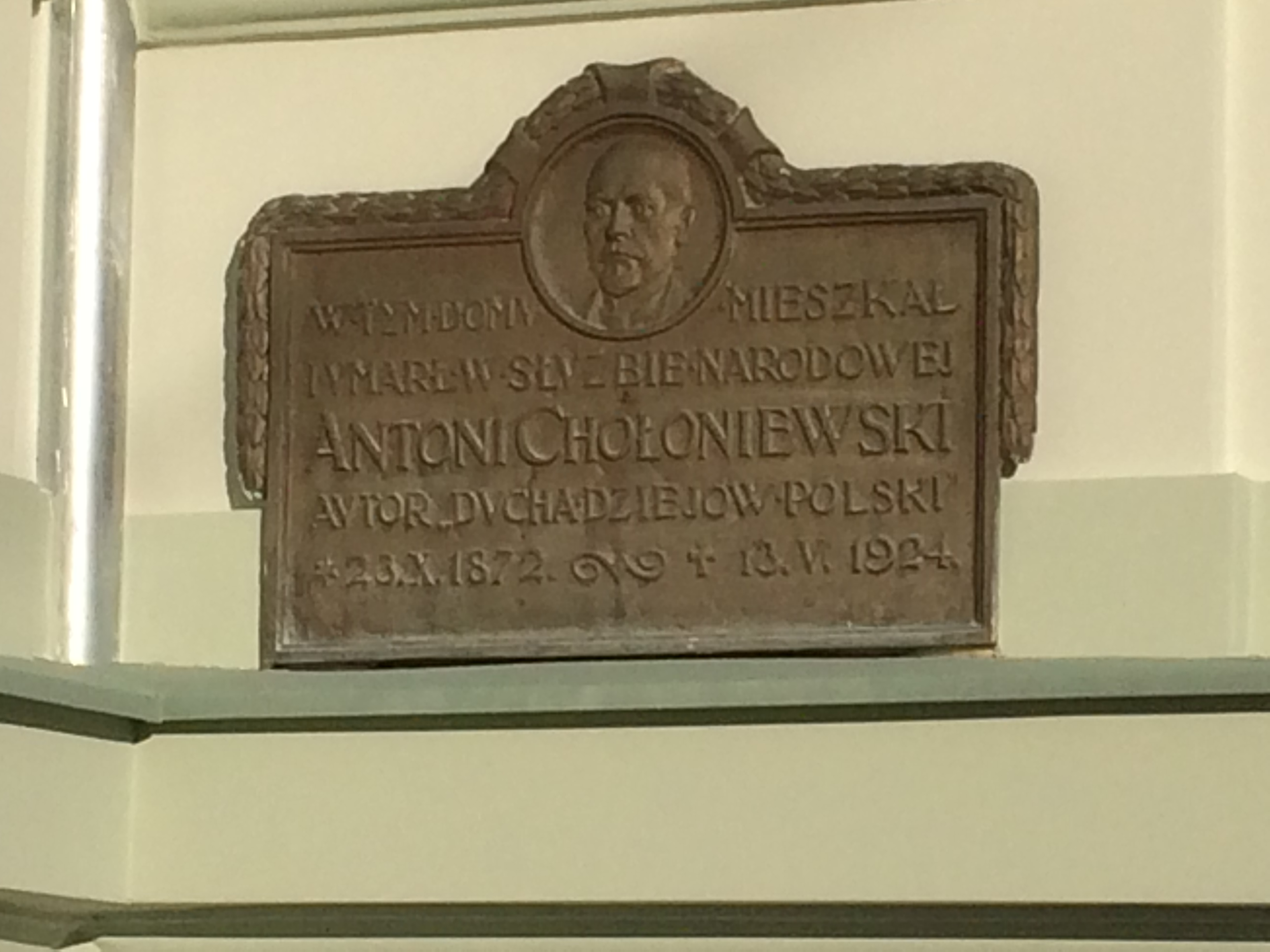
Plaque at Nr.119

== See also ==
- Bydgoszcz
- Gdanska Street in Bydgoszcz
- Fritz Weidner
- (in Polish) Downtown district in Bydgoszcz

== Bibliography ==
- Bręczewska-Kulesza Daria, Derkowska-Kostkowska Bogna, Wysocka A. (2003). Ulica Gdańska. Przewodnik historyczny (in Polish). Bydgoszcz: Wojewódzki Ośrodek Kultury w Bydgoszczy. ISBN 8386970103.
- (in Polish) Bręczewska-Kulesza Daria: Bydgoskie realizacje Heinricha Seelinga. Materiały do dziejów kultury i sztuki Bydgoszczy i regionu. Zeszyt 4. Pracownia Dokumentacji i Popularyzacji Zabytków Wojewódzkiego Ośrodka Kultury w Bydgoszczy. Bydgoszcz 1999
- (in Polish) Parucka Krystyna. Zabytki Bydgoszczy – minikatalog. "Tifen" Krystyna Parucka. Bydgoszcz 2008. ISBN 978-83-927191-0-6
