= Antoni Chołoniewski =

Polish journalist, national activist (1872–1924)

- Antoni Chołoniewski–Myszka
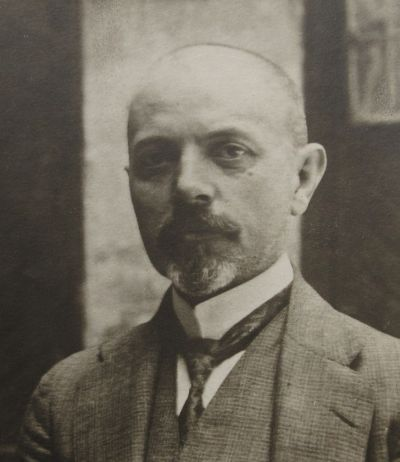
- Antoni Chołoniewski in 1915
- Born: 23 October 1872; Kavske, Russian Empire
- Died: 13 May 1924 (aged 51); Bydgoszcz, Poland
- Resting place: Nowofarny Cemetery, Bydgoszcz
- Other names: Korczak, Pełka, Antoni Stanisław Olechnowicz, Strzała, Szary
- Occupations: Journalist, publicist, national activist
- Spouse: Kamilla Chołoniewska
- Children: Mieczysław, Bolesław

Antoni Chołoniewski–Myszka (1872–1924), was a Polish journalist, publicist and a national activist.

== Biography ==
Antoni Chołoniewski–Myszka, or Antoni Chołoniewski was born on 23 October 1872 in Kavske, then called Kawsko, near Stryi, now in western Ukraine. His family was from landed nobility, linked to the Korczak clan. His mother was Katarzyna née Hrynkiewicz. His father Ferdinand fought as a lieutenant under General Józef Bem during the Hungarian Revolution of 1848. The property of the Chołoniewski family was confiscated by the Austrian authorities following Ferdinand's participation to this uprising.

He attended a gymnasium in Stryi and lost his parents early in his youth. As a consequence, Antoni had to earn early his living by writing; as such, the first texts he penned were articles about the Podkarpacie region to be edited by Lwów newspapers.

In 1891, he moved to Lwów and started working in the editorial office of the Przegląd Lwowski, a biweekly scientific, literary and political journal. In 1894, he opted for the editorial office of the Dziennik Polski.

There, he took over the department of culture and national affairs while working at the same time as a correspondent for other papers:

- Saint Petersburg's Kraj;
- Kraków's Życie.

During this period, he wrote his first book, Nieśmiertelni. Fotografie literatów lwowskich (English: Immortals. Photographs of Lwów writers). Issued in 1898, Antoni described in it the journalistic and literary milieu of the city. In 1902, he released Życiorys Kościuszko (English: Biography of Kościuszko), which was a popular success.

In 1903, he relocated to Kraków, where after several stints, he took the position of chief editor of the local print of Warsaw biweekly Świat, just founded in 1906 by Stefan Krzywoszewski (1866–1950). Quickly he turned towards journalism, visiting Silesia, Wielkopolska and Pomerania. In 1909, Chołoniewski visited for the first time Gdańsk: he was sent by the editors of Świat in order to survey the situation of Poles in these regions, so as to confirm the Germanization policy imposed by the authorities.

In particular, he was a fervent champion of national Polish identity in the Western Borderlands. From 1913 onwards, he regularly advocated them in several of his publications.

Chołoniewski was the first Polish journalist to draw the attention of the Polish public to Gdynia, then a small fishing village. Furthermore, he contributed to the establishment of the first boarding house for Polish holiday goers.

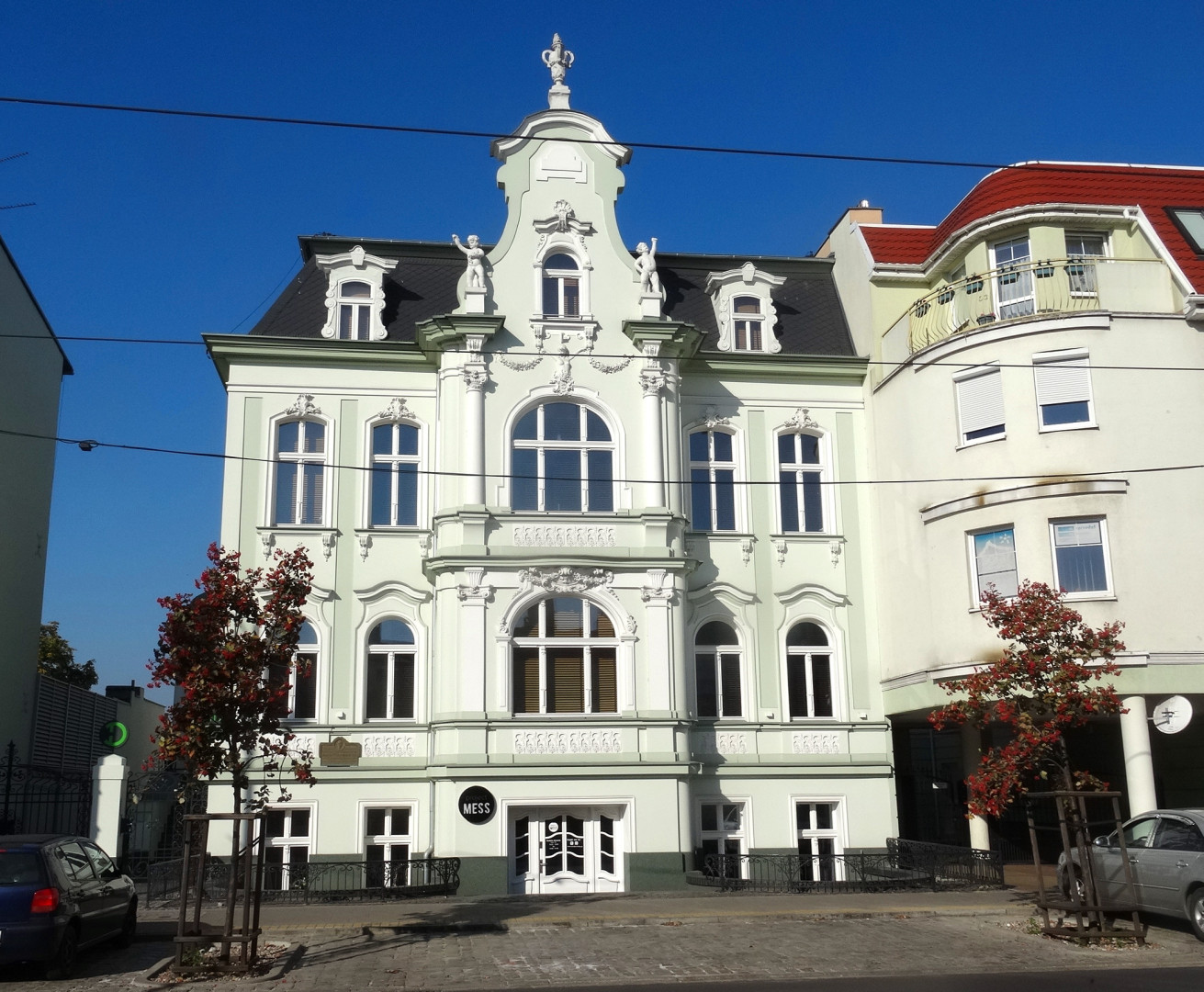
Chołoniewski's villa in Bydgoszcz

He constantly highlighted the tensions in Wielkopolska and Pomerania and he expressed such thoughts in historical and political books.

He penned his most famous work in 1917: Duch dziejów Polski (English: The Spirit of Polish History), immediately translated into German, French, English, Romanian and Bulgarian.

After Poland regained independence, Antoni moved in 1919 to Sopot, then Gdańsk. In Sopot his wife Kamila bought buildings at then Sudstrasse 11-15 (today Grunwaldzka street) and Parkstrasse 6 (now Parkowa street) and opened there a guesthouse. At this time, Antoni worked on further spreading the idea of Polish nationalism. His ideas exposed him to harassment from the side of the Senate of the Free City of Danzig, which was administrating independently the area since 1920. In the spring of 1921, the Senate issued a decision to expel Antoni Chołoniewski from the territory of the Free City. As a consequence, he moved to Bydgoszcz, where he had been previously treated by a local doctor.

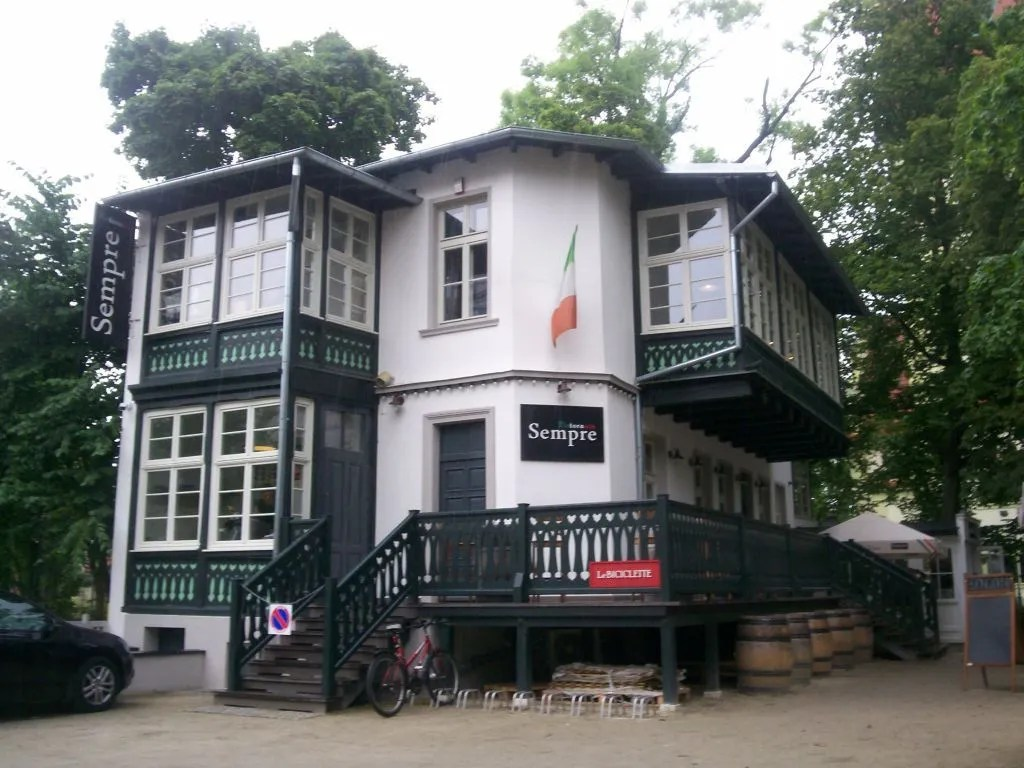
Chołoniewski's villa in Sopot

In Bydgoszcz, Chołoniewski lived at 119 Gdańska Street. He resumed his journalistic activity devoted to "Polishness" in the Western Borderlands. Despite a deteriorating health, he published many articles, not only in his own magazine Zmartwychwstanie (English: Resurrection) in 1922, but also in the Christian Democrat periodicals Dziennik Bydgoski (English: Bydgoszcz Journal) and Dziennik Poznański.

During this period, he additionally contributed to the creation in Wąbrzeźno of the Polish National Institute (Polish: Polski Instytut Narodowy), together with Stanisławe Jasiński and Włodzimierz Tetmajer from Kraków. This organization, one of the first of its kind in the area, aimed at educating, publishing Polish press and literature and spreading Polish culture.

In his last year, Antoni edited a bimonthly Biblioteka Pomorska, dealing with art, science, literature and popular culture in Polish Pomerania.

He died on 13 May 1924 in Bydgoszcz after a long illness. He was buried in the Nowofarny Cemetery of Bydgoszcz: in 1987 his grave was liquidated.

The authorities of Sopot seized Chołoniewskis' property before the outbreak of World War II and in March 1940, the buildings were demolished and the area covered with grass. Out of the Chołoniewski's estate, only a small residential edifice is still preserved today at 11 Grunwaldzka street.

== Themes and works ==
- Defence of the Polish national feeling or "Polishness" in the Western borderlands (eastern ragions of Pomerania, Wielkopolska, Warmia and parts of Upper Silesia). Chołoniewski tackled this topic in his following works:
  - Nad morzem polskim (English: On Polish seaside) 1913;
  - Gdańsk i Pomorze (English: Gdańsk and the Pomerania) 1919, translated into French;
  - Taniec wśród mieczów (English: Dance among swords) 1920.
- Despite his national orientation, Antoni Chołoniewski was a writer free from any chauvinism and always referred to the most positive and beautiful Polish traditions, such as democracy or tolerance, like in his 1917 masterpiece Duch dziejów Polski.

He particularly championed the assimilation of Jews, fighting both Antisemitism and Jewish Autonomism.

- Highlighting and repairing historical and political struggles involving Polish nationalism. He described this ideas in the following:
  - Istota walki polsko–rosyjskiej (English: The essence of the Polish–Russian struggle) 1916;
  - Dialog o Polsce i małych narodach (English: Dialogue about Poland and small nations) 1916;
  - Państwo polskie, jego wskrzeszenie i widoki rozwoju (English: The Polish state, its resurrection and development views).
- Chołoniewski's main work, Duch dziejów Polski (English: The Spirit of Polish History), is a treaty on the First Polish Republic, idealising its history so much that it raised criticism of his contemporary historians.

== Family ==
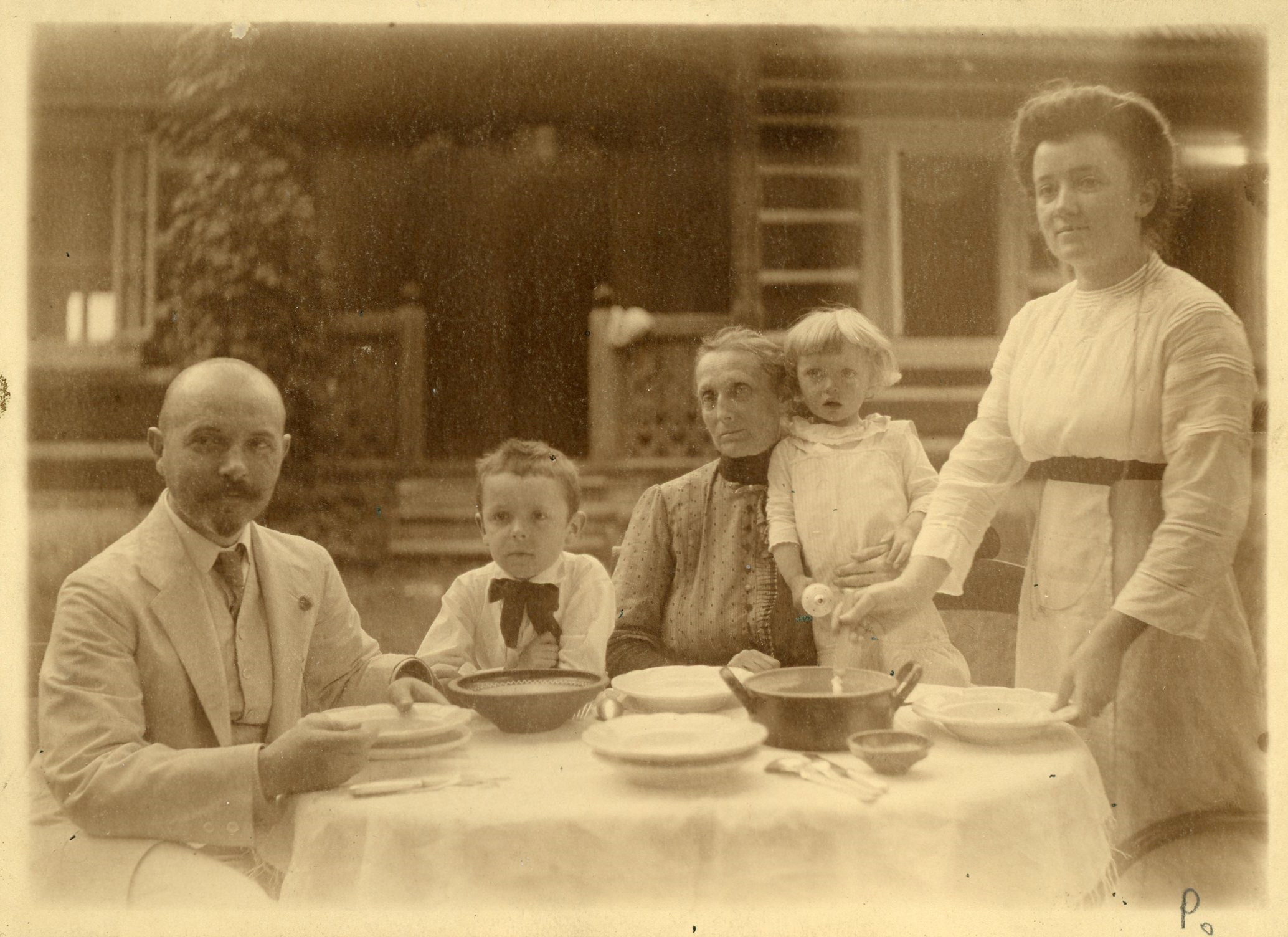
Antoni, his two sons, Kamilla's mother and Kamilla, 1912

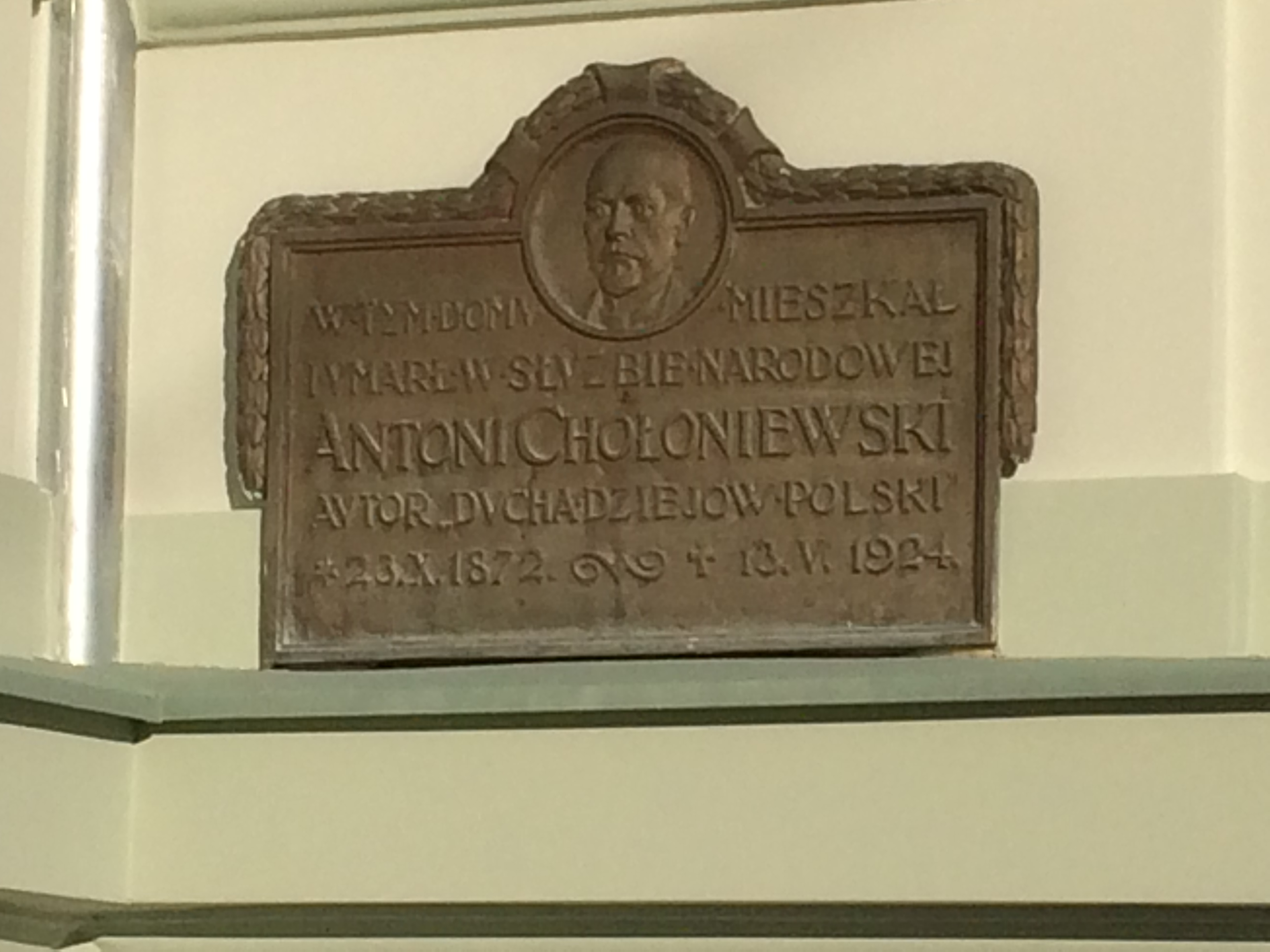
Plaque at 119 Gdanska Street

- Kamilla Chołoniewska, his wife
  - Kamilla Florentyna Maria Chołoniewska, née Głuchowska (1877–1936), was a social activist, writer, journalist, teacher and entrepreneur. During the First World War, she organized help for Polish legionnaires and political prisoners. Later she was active in various women's associations, especially as the president of the "Association of Scientific Assistance for Women", allowing students to study higher education by granting scholarships. While in Bydgoszcz with Antoni, she founded and ran a workshop and a school. As a supporter of women's higher education, she co-founded the first female gymnasium in Lviv. In 1934, she took over the leadership of the "National School of Homework" in Warsaw.
    - Her maternal grandfather was Ludwik Mierosławski (1814–1878): a Polish general, writer, poet, historian and political activist. He took part in the November Uprising, then emigrated to France, before coming back during the 1846 Greater Poland Uprising 1846, where he was taken prisoner. Following an amnesty, he fought in the Palatine uprising in 1849, on the side of the insurgents. After his return to France, he had contacts with Italian activists like Giuseppe Garibaldi. Eventually, he participated in the January Uprising in 1863–1864.
    - Her father was Franciszek Mieczysław Głuchowski (1852–1903), a Polish doctor and pediatrician. In 1888, he self-published the first

wide study devoted to the spa values in the city of Rabka–Zdrój where he was working.

- Antoni and Kamilla had two sons, Mieczysław and Bolesław. The latter died in 1942 at the Auschwitz concentration camp during WWII without

progeny.

- Mieczysław and his wife Leandra had two children, a daughter Kamilla and a son, Jacek Chołoniewski. Born in 1957, Jacek is a Polish entrepreneur, independent journalist and economic expert, doctor of physical sciences.

== Commemorations ==
- A commemorative plaque was placed on the facade of the villa he inhabited with his family, while in Bydgoszcz, at 119 Gdańska Street.
- A street in the Szwederowo district of Bydgoszcz has been also named after him.

== See also ==
- Bydgoszcz
- Western Borderlands
- Pomerania
- List of Polish people

== Bibliography ==
- (in Polish) Błażejewski Stanisław, Kutta Janusz, Romaniuk Marek (1996). Bydgoski Słownik Biograficzny. Tom III. Bydgoszcz: Wojewódzki Ośrodek Kultury. pp. 50–51. ISBN 8385327320.
