= Jan and Jędrzej Śniadecki Street, Bydgoszcz =

Street in Bydgoszcz, Poland

Coordinates: 53.1299°N 18.0019°E

Jan and Jędrzej Śniadecki Street
Bydgoszcz
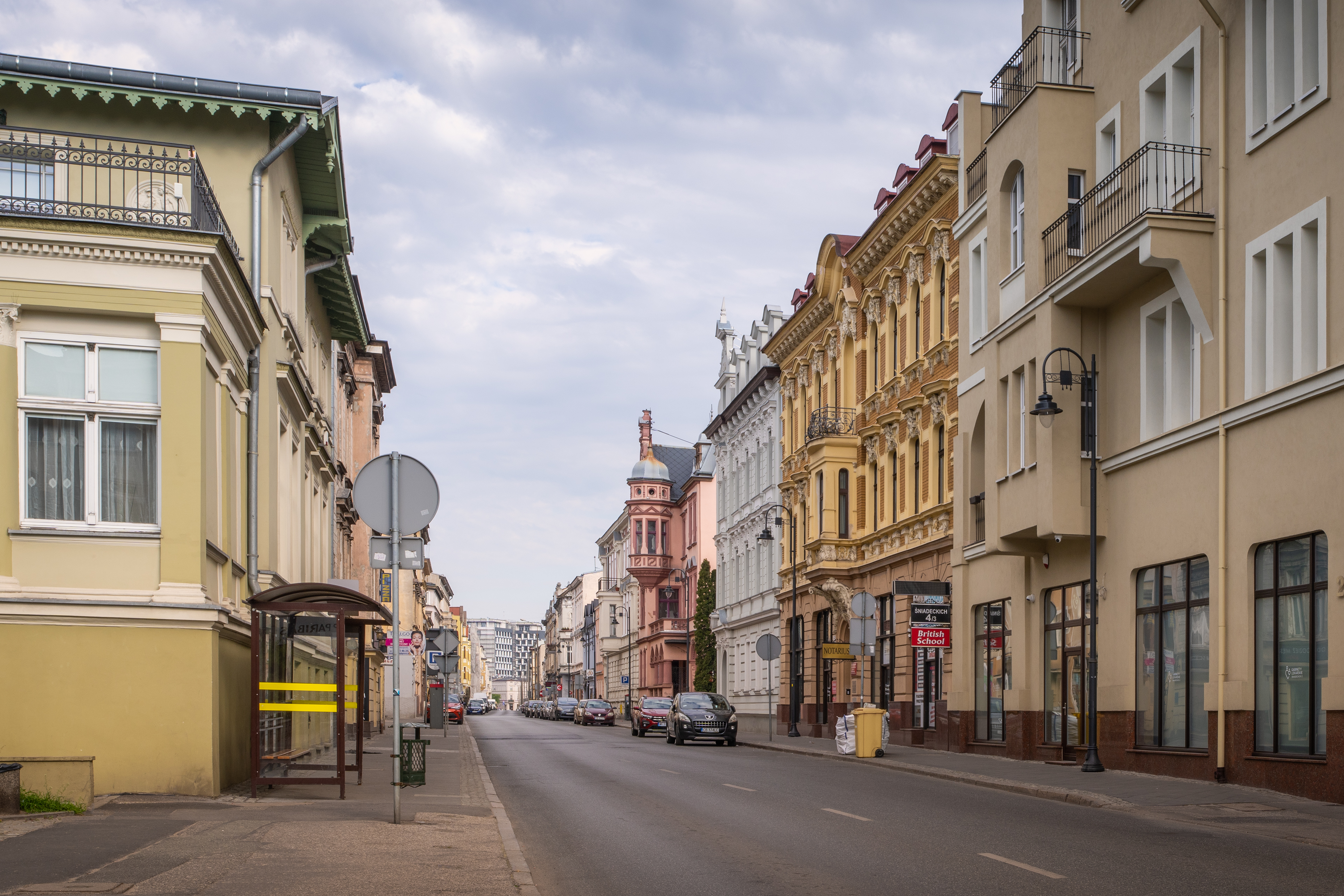
- View of the street

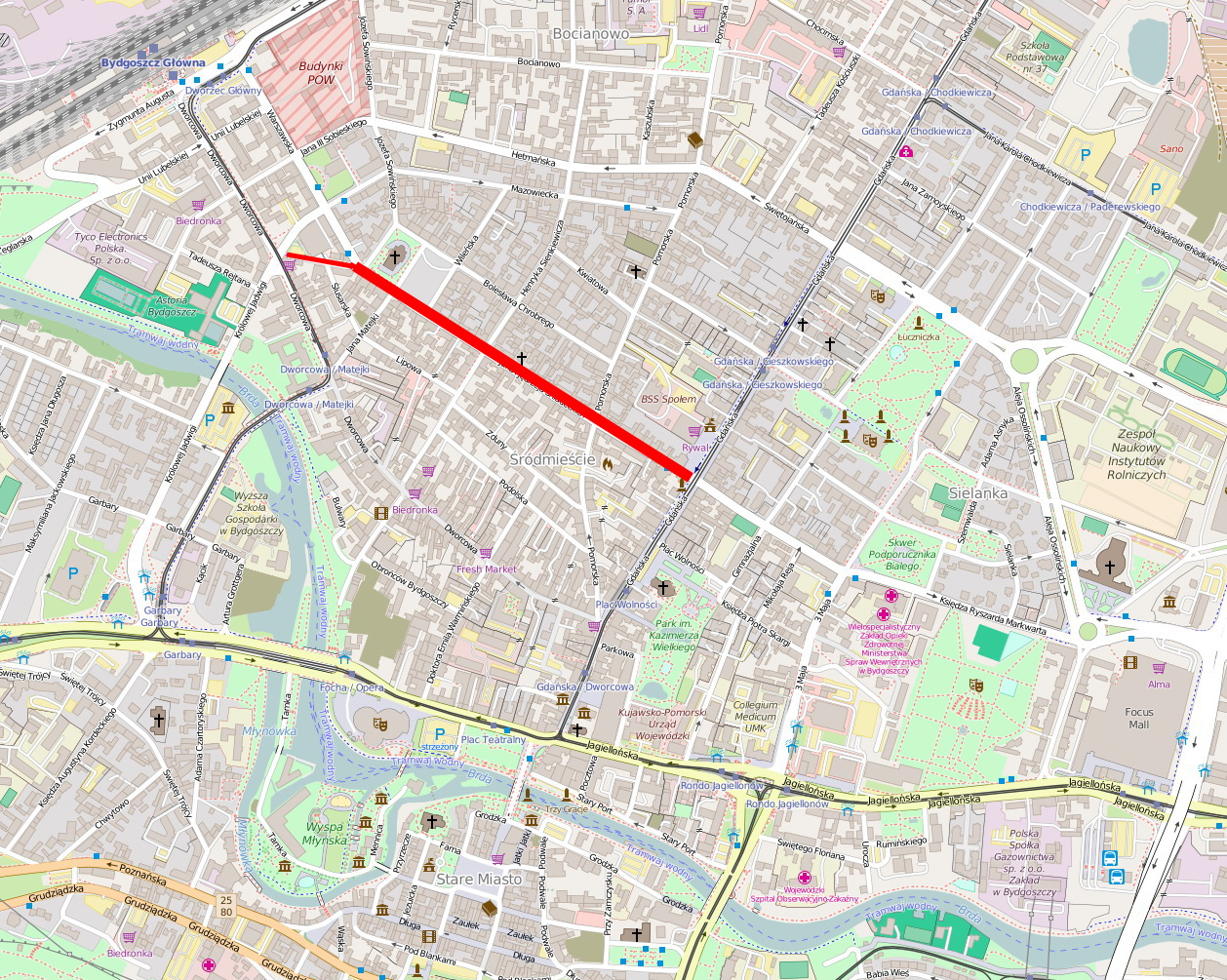
- Location of Śniadecki Street
- Native name: Ulica Jana i Jędrzeja Śniadeckich (Polish)
- Former names: Elisabethstraße, Dr Goebbels straße
- Namesake: Jan and Jędrzej Śniadecki
- Owner: City of Bydgoszcz
- Length: 800 m (2,600 ft)
- Area: Downtown district
- Location: Bydgoszcz, Poland

Other
- Status: se

Śniadecki Street is a street in downtown of Bydgoszcz, Poland. It has an important mercantile concentration.

== Location ==
Śniadecki Street is oriented east–west and provides a link between Gdańska Street, Bydgoszcz in the east and Dworcowa Street in Bydgoszcz to the west. It crosses an important city plaza, Piastowski Square (Polish: Plac Piastowski).

The presence of the Brda hotel practically closes the western tip of Śniadeckich Street to traffic with a final very narrow section.

== Naming ==
Through history, this street had the following names:

- Until 1920, Elisabethstraße, from Elisabeth Ludovika of Bavaria, wife of King Frederick William IV of Prussia (1795–1861);
- 1920–1939, Jan and Jędrzej Śniadecki;
- 1939–1945, Dr Goebbels Straße;
- since 1945, Jan and Jędrzej Śniadecki.

Current patrons of the street are brothers Śniadecki: Jan Śniadecki, an astronomer, and Jędrzej Śniadecki, a doctor, biologist and chemist. They were born in Żnin and both taught as professors at Stefan Batory University of Vilnius in the end of the 18th century and beginning of the 19th century.

== History ==
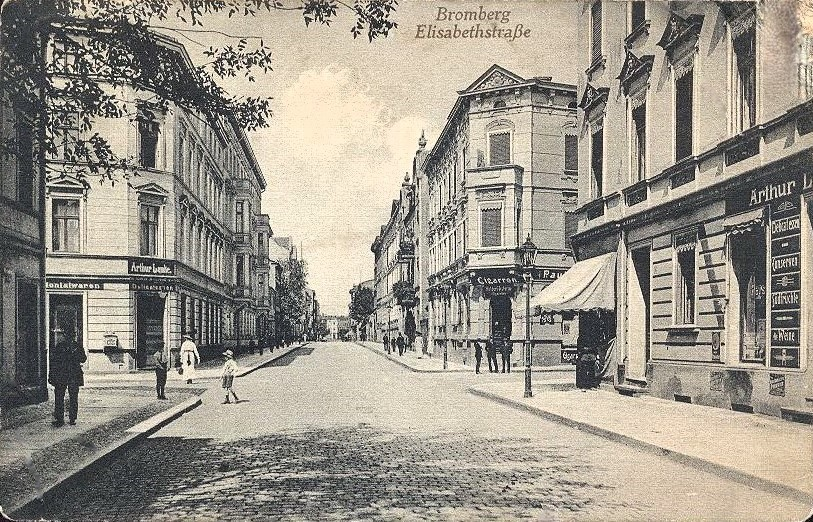
The street in 1905

The street was defined in the mid-19th century. As a consequence of the set up in 1851, of the railway station (Polish: Bydgoszcz Główna) in the north-west of Bydgoszcz, an intensive urban development happened in order to connect this area with the historical heart of the city, Gdańska Street. It is the same process that led to the development of nearby Dworcowa Street. At that time, the street was named Elisabethstraße, along with Elisabethmarkt (now Piastkowski Plac) the plaza it crossed to the north, in honor of Elisabeth Ludovika of Bavaria, wife of the reigning the King of Prussia Frederick William IV of Prussia.

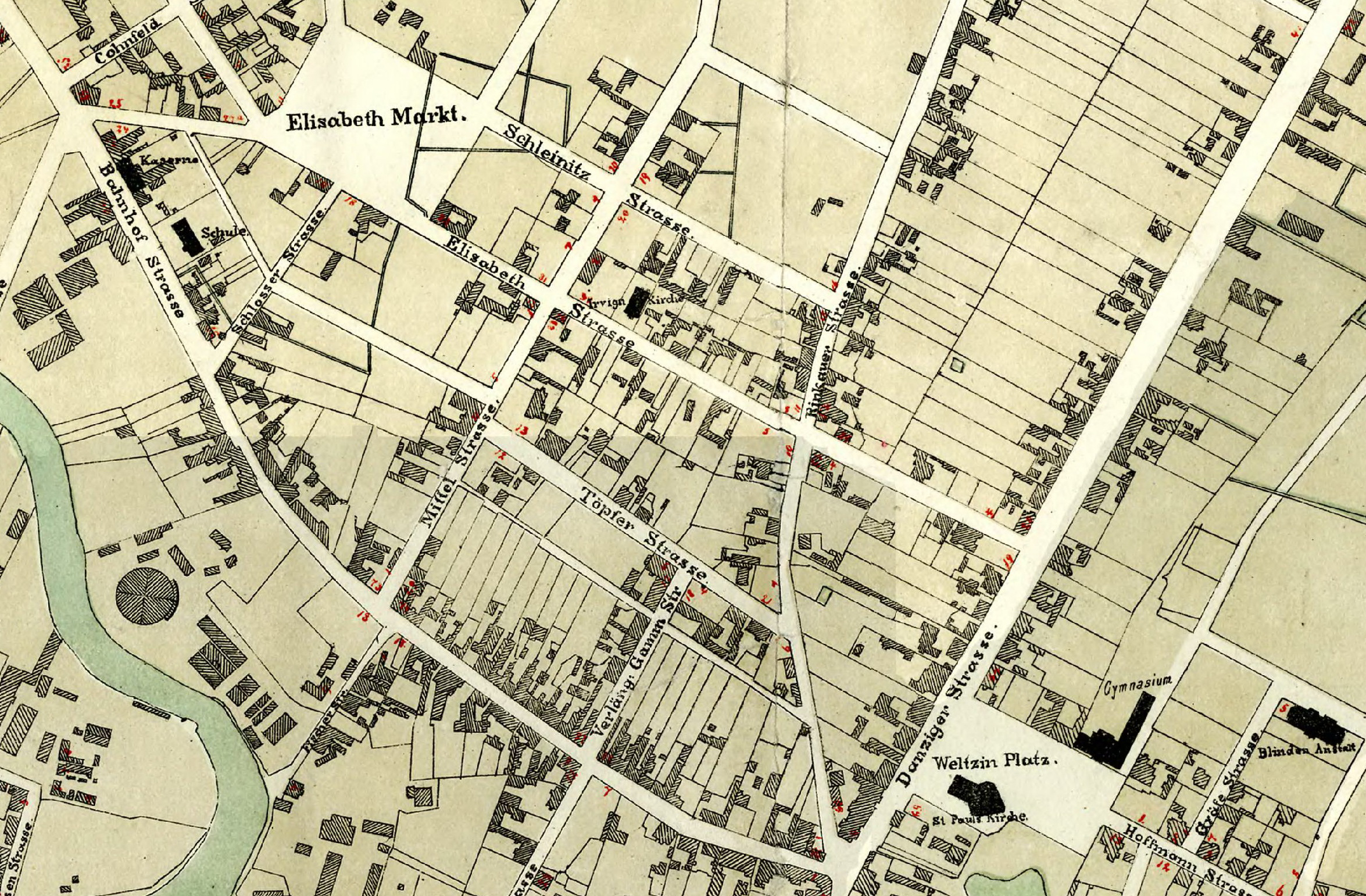
Elisabethstraße on an 1876 map

On this axis have been erected also religious edifices, such as in 1910-1913 the Church of the Sacred Heart of Jesus on Elisabethmarkt, or the Church of the Resurrection in Elisabethstraße.

The importance of this avenue slowly decreased with the growing role that took Dworcowa Street, parallel to the south, but broader and larger, which had been used since 1888 by a newly built streetcar.

== Main places and buildings ==
=== Marian Rejewski Square, at crossing with Gdańska Street ===
2005

This small green area has been named after Marian Rejewski, an eminent mathematician born in Bydgoszcz on August 16, 1905. In 2005, Bydgoszcz municipality unveiled a memorial by Michał Kubiak in this square to celebrate the centennial of Rejewski's birth. It resembles the Alan Turing Memorial in Manchester unveiled in 2001.

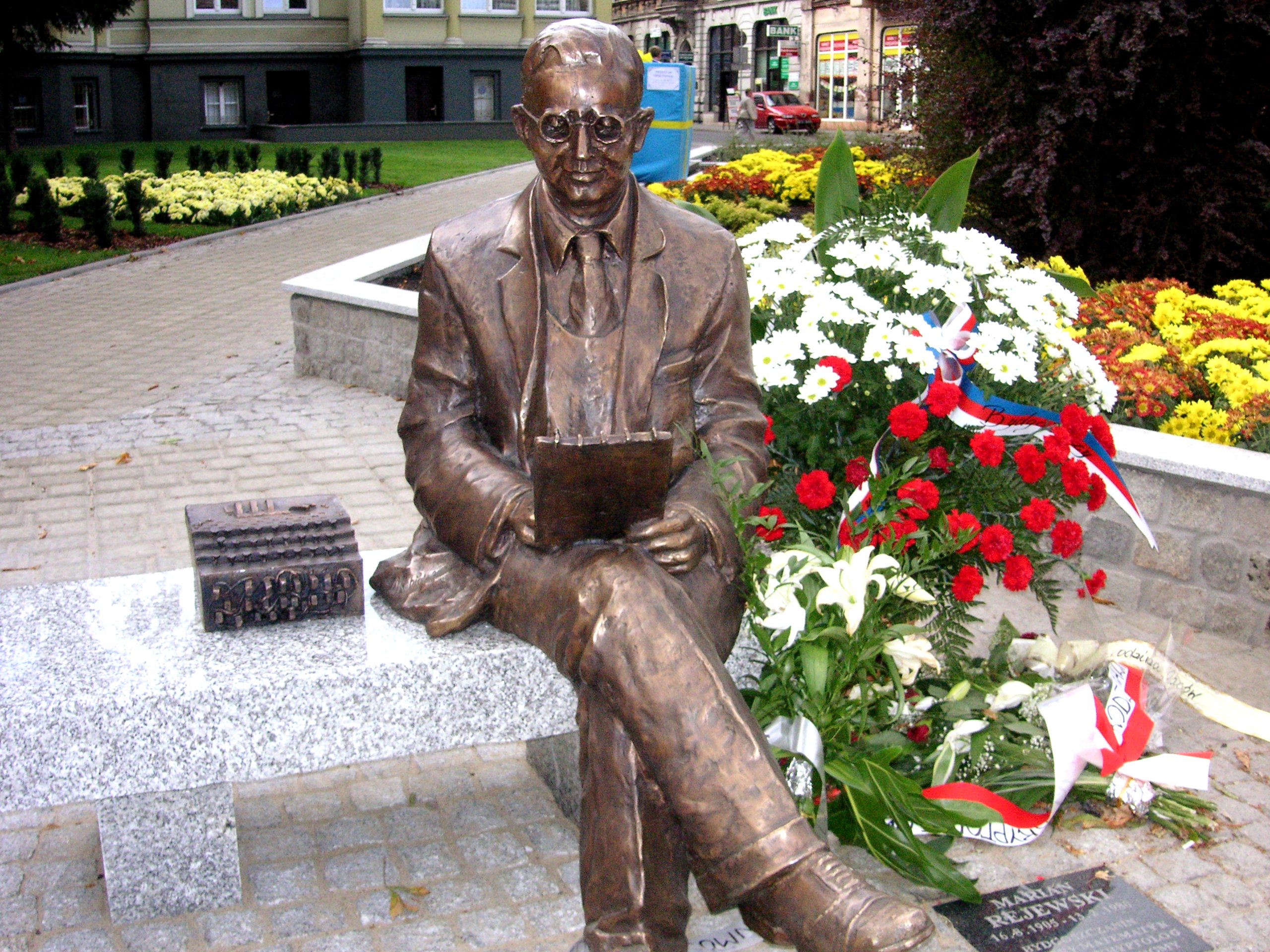
Marain Rejewski memorial

=== Villa Aronsohn, at 1 ===
Registered on Kuyavian-Pomeranian Voivodeship heritage list, Nr.601416-Reg.A/889, June 15, 1993

1850–1860

Neo-renaissance

Lewin Louis Aronsohn was a famous banker, Jewish active member, politician and philanthropist. A recent restoration occurred in January 2016.

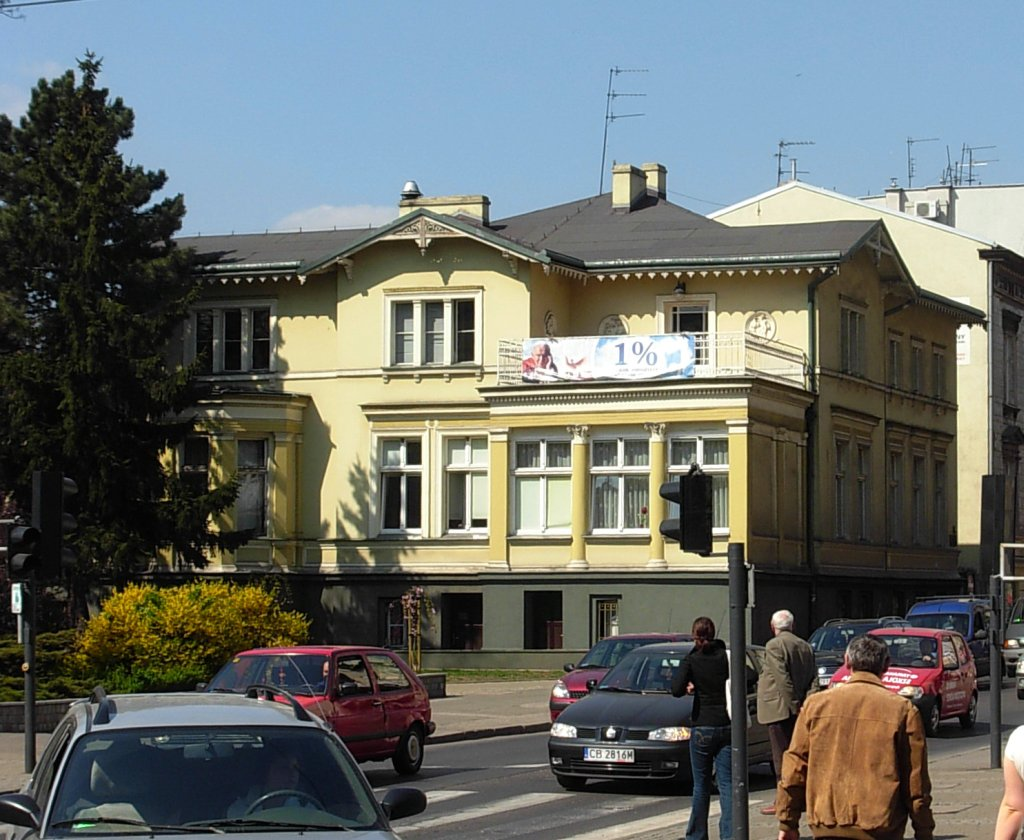
Villa Aronsohn

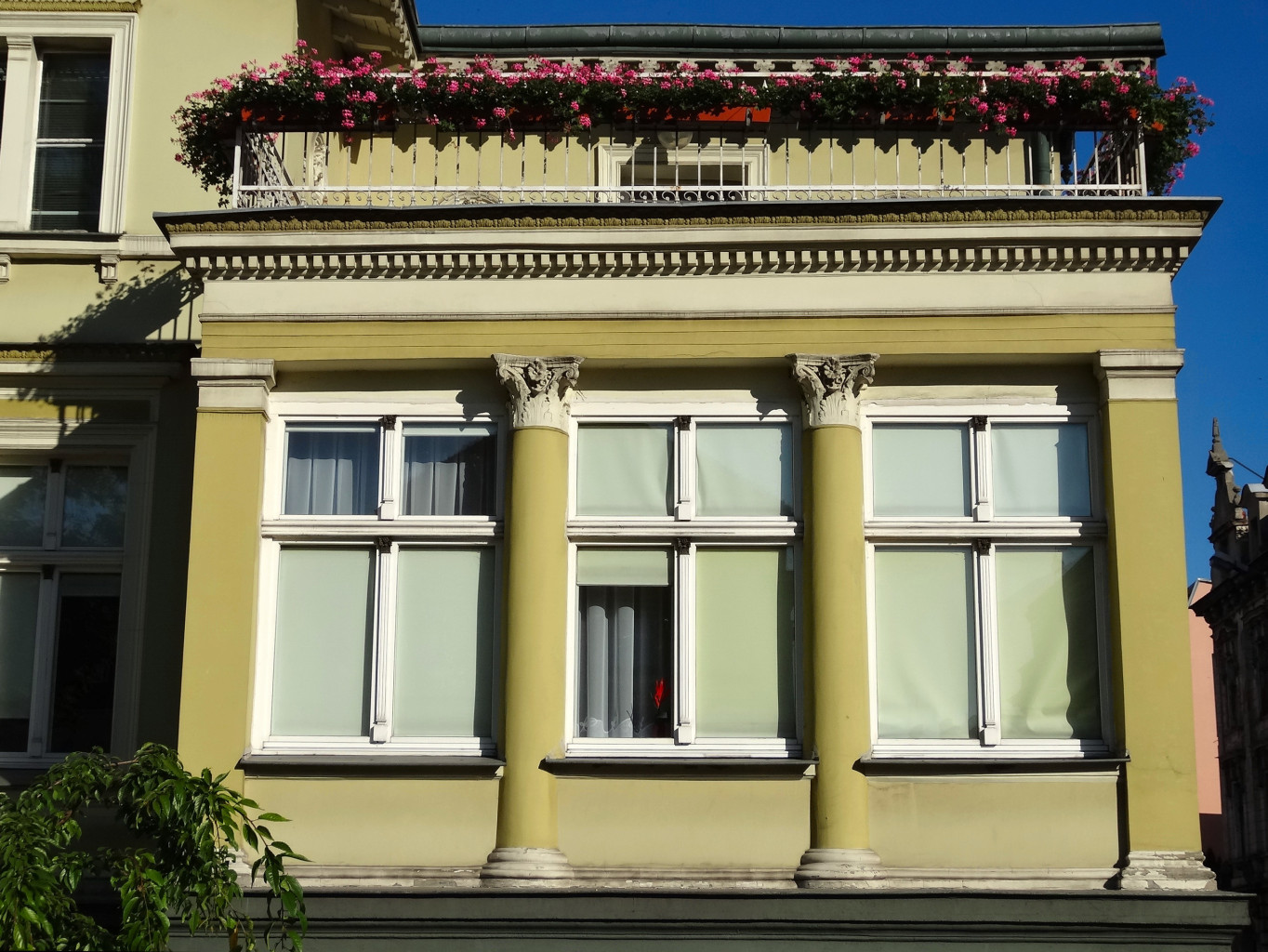
Detail of the balcony

=== Moritz Ephraim tenement, at 2 ===
1905, by Fritz Weidner

German historicism

The tenement has been delivered on August 25, 1905, to Moritz Ephraim, a rentier. The address was then Elisabethstraße 56. Architectural characteristics of the facade are very similar to his house at 34 Gdańska Street that he realized the following year (1906).

This building housed from 1910 Pianoforte-Magazin, the show-room of Bruno Sommerfeld, an eminent piano-maker from 1905 to the start of World War II. His first workshop was at Nr.22 and at his climax, Sommerfeld industry was the largest factory of pianos and wholesale in Poland (1920–1939).

The side house on the right, now gone, located at the corner with Gdańska Street, was the birthplace of artist Walter Leistikow.

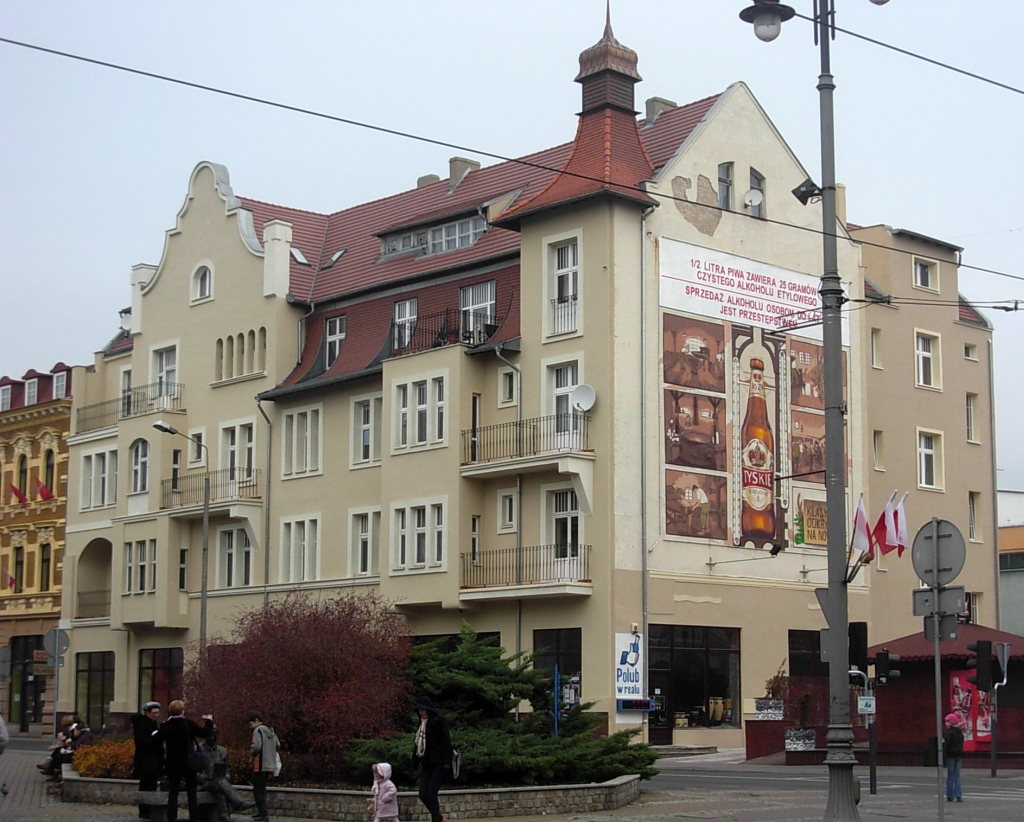
View from Gdańska Street

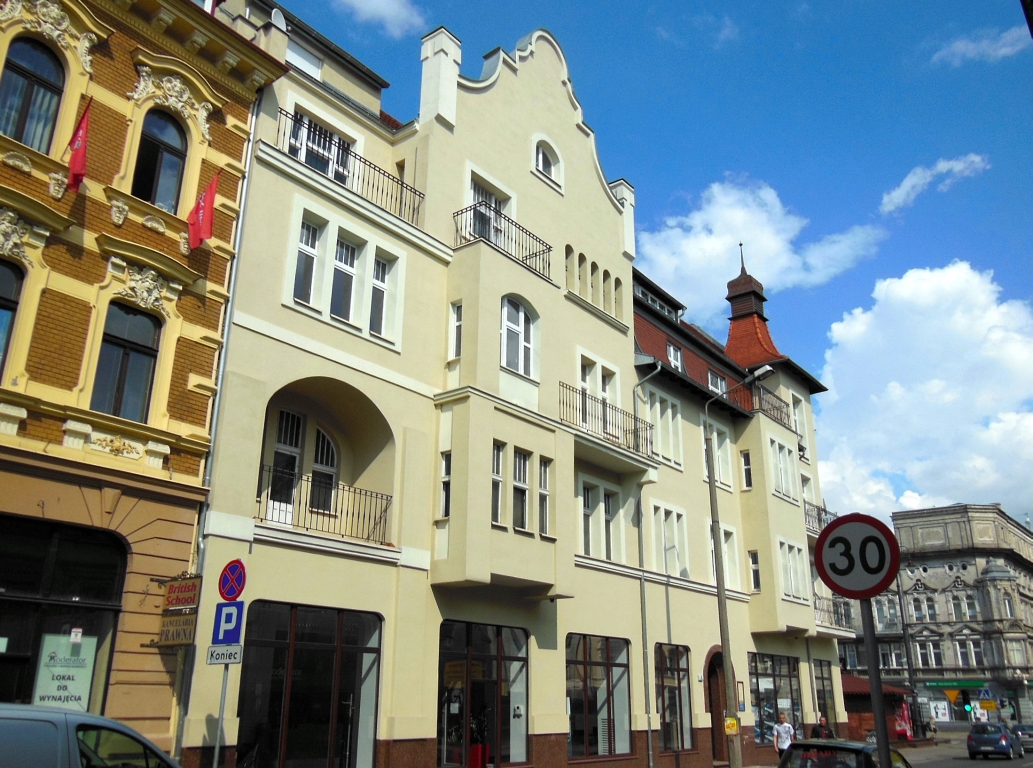
Main facade onto Śniadeckich Street

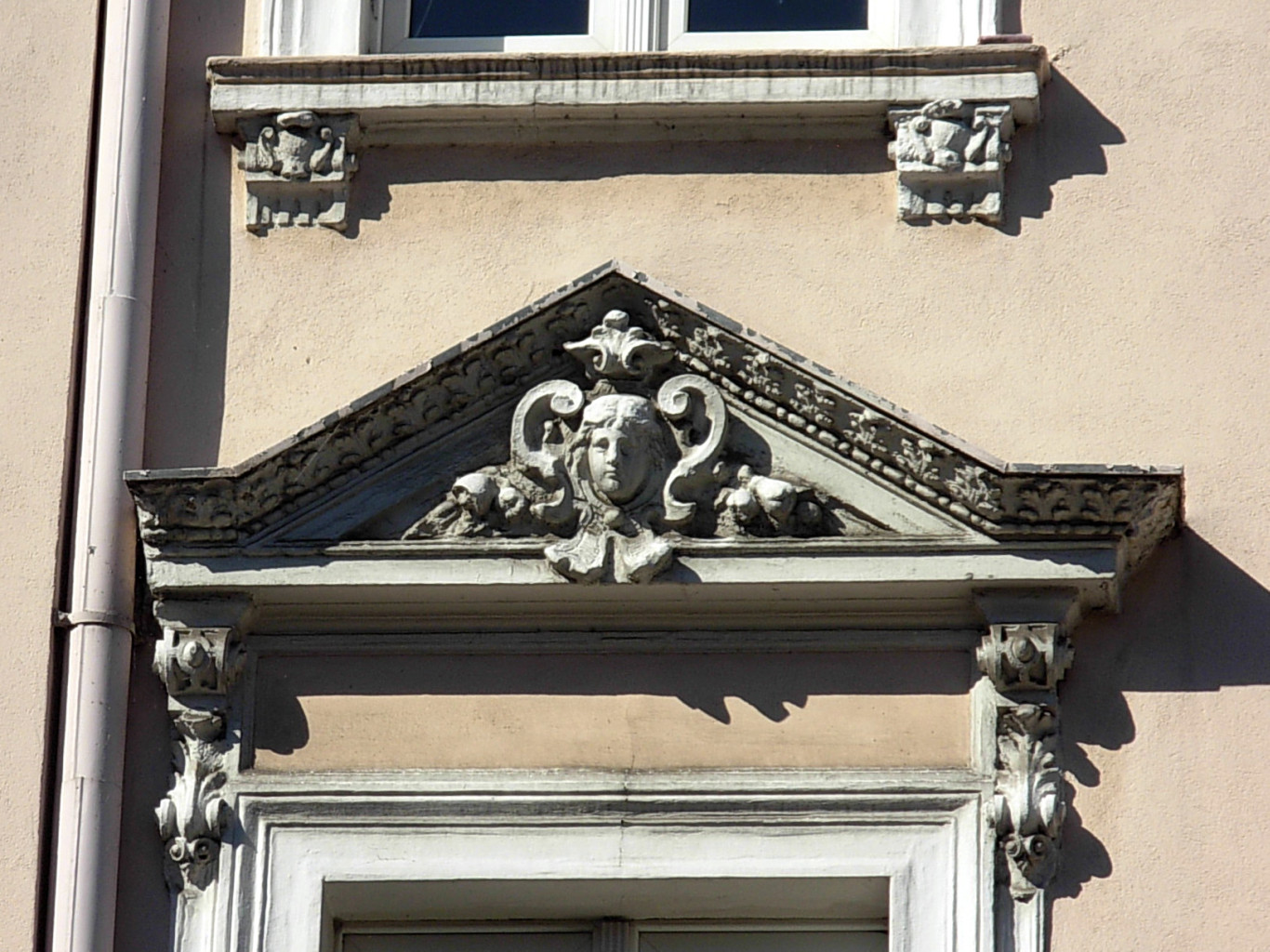
Detail of a pediment

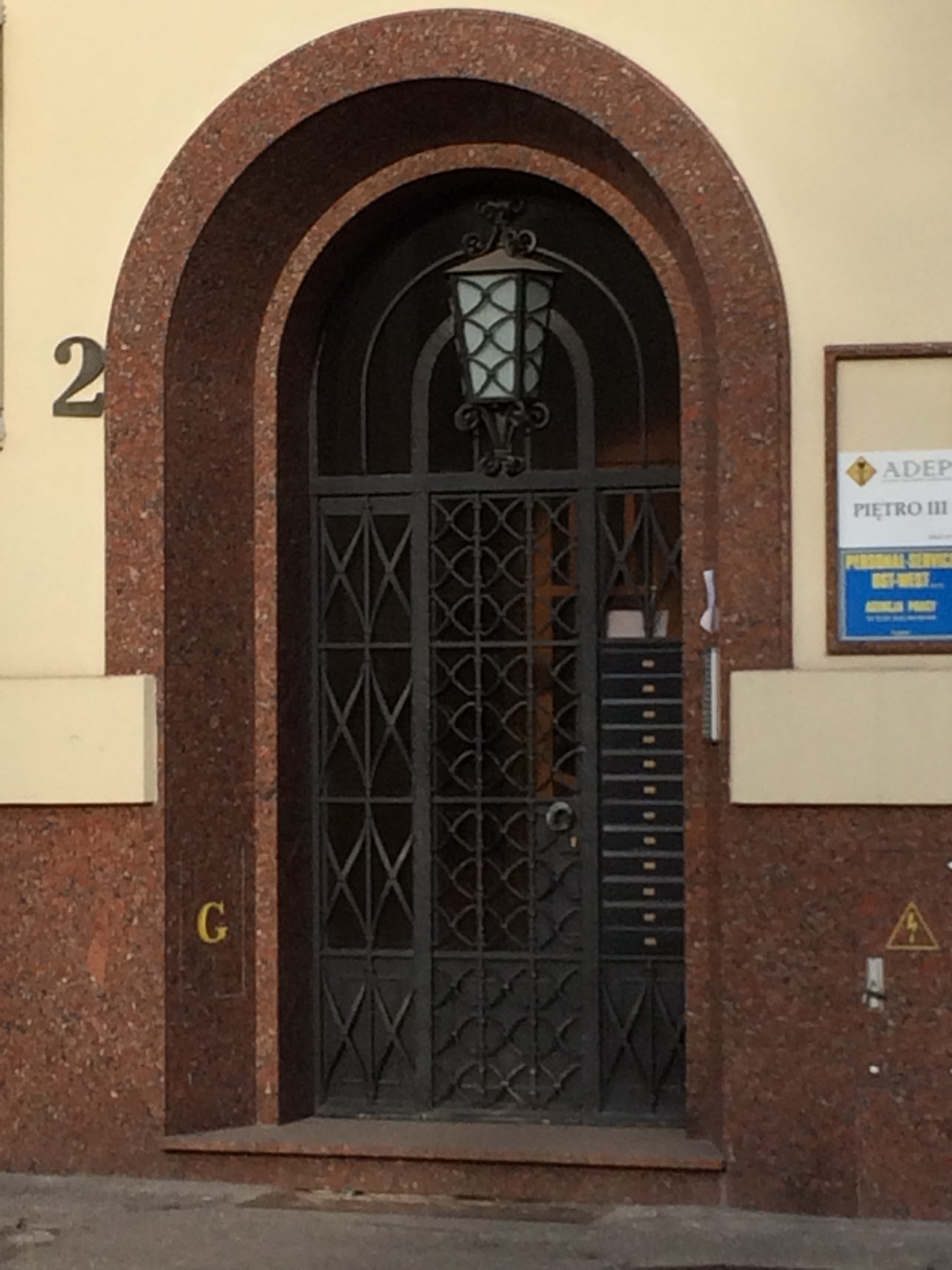
Main gate

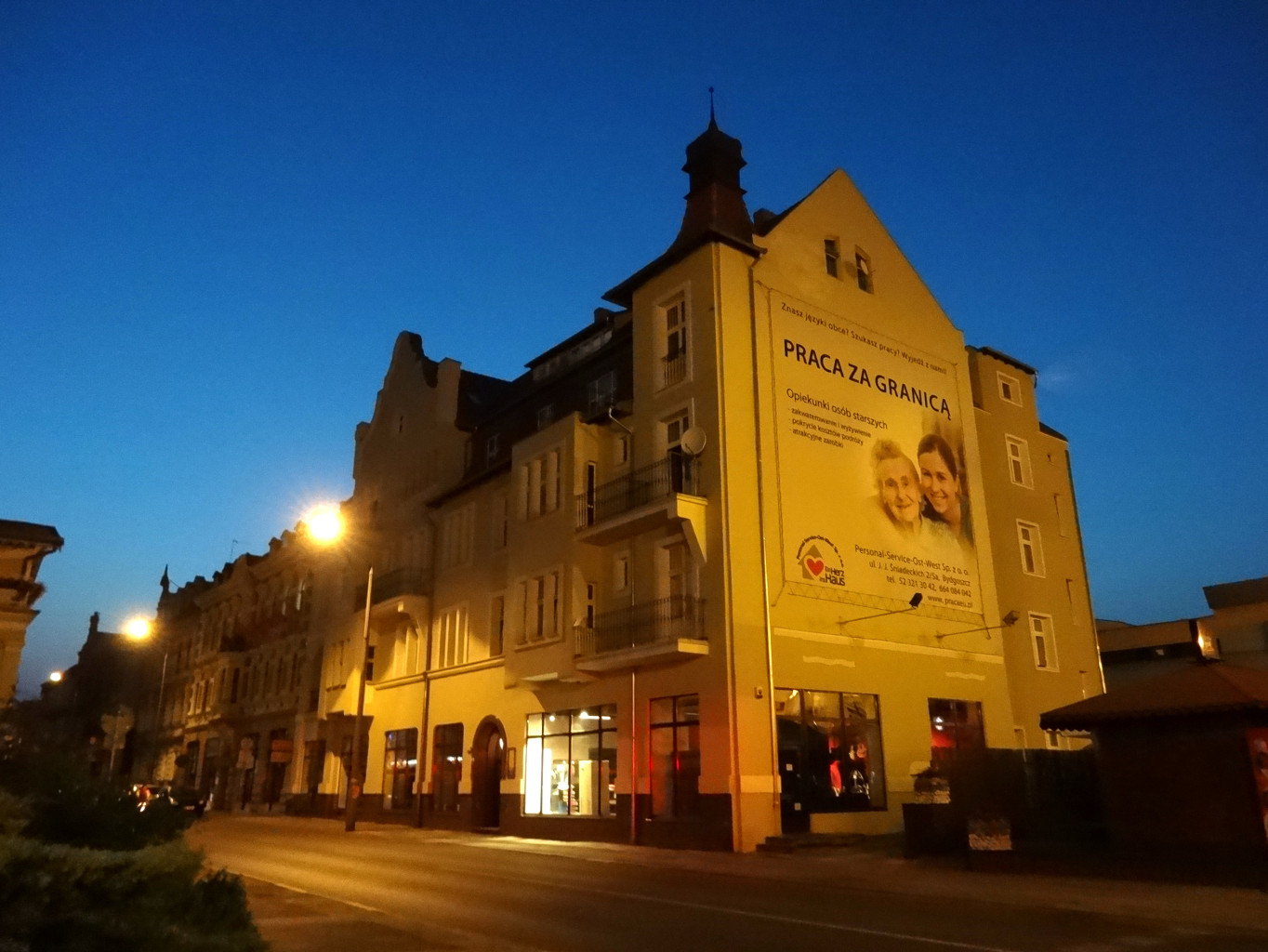
By night

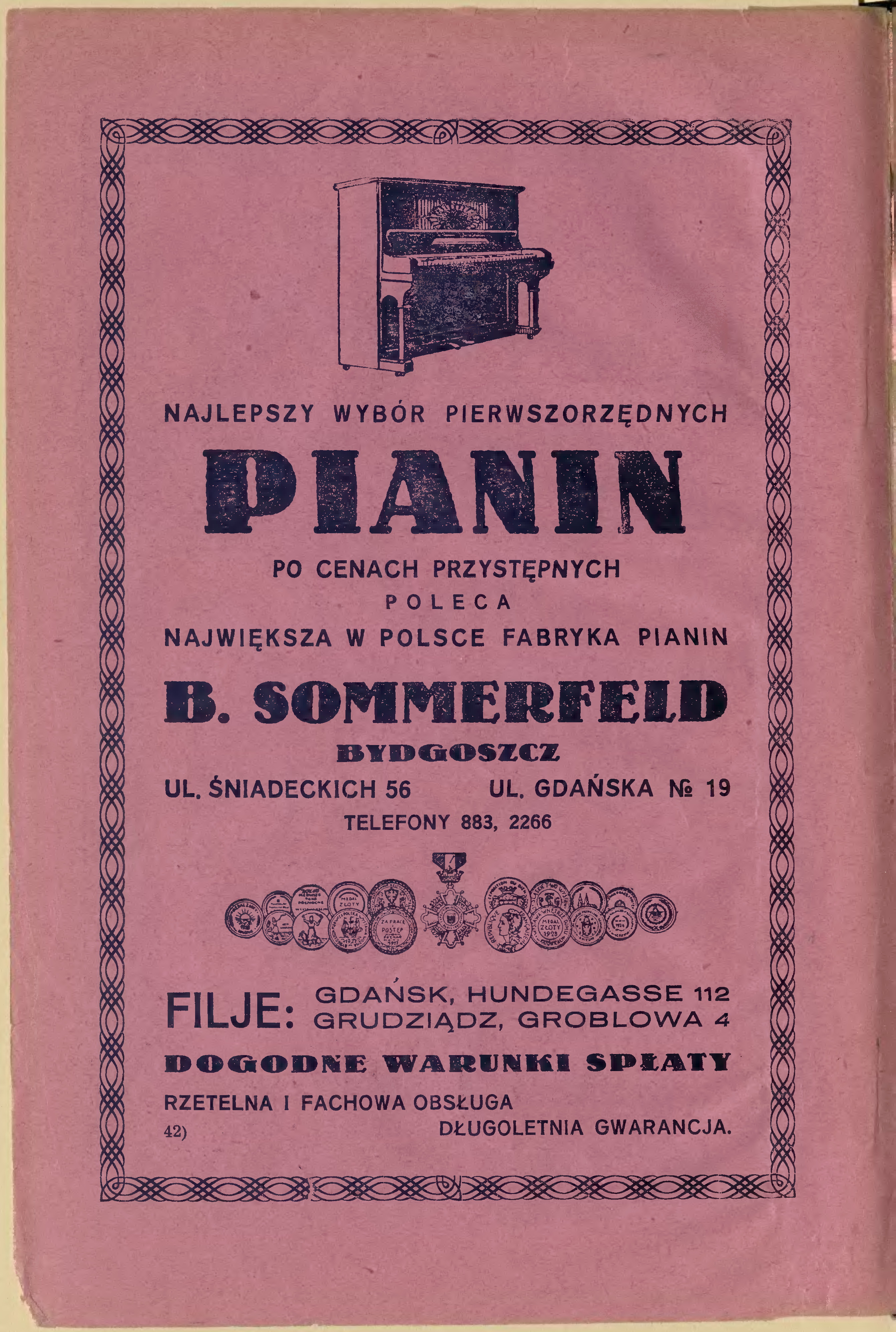
1930 Advertising for Piano Sommerfeld, with German street numbering, "Nr.56"

=== Tenement at 3 ===
Registered on Kuyavian-Pomeranian Voivodeship heritage list, Nr.601419, Reg.A/1098/1-2, April 4, 1994

1873

Eclecticism

The ensemble, at then Elisabethstraße 2, was first the property of Robert Frenmark, an army Major. It comprises also a small building on the other side of the gate.

The facade boasts consoles or pediments on top of each windows. A continuous frieze adorned the top of the elevation, running also along the slight avant-corps on the right side.

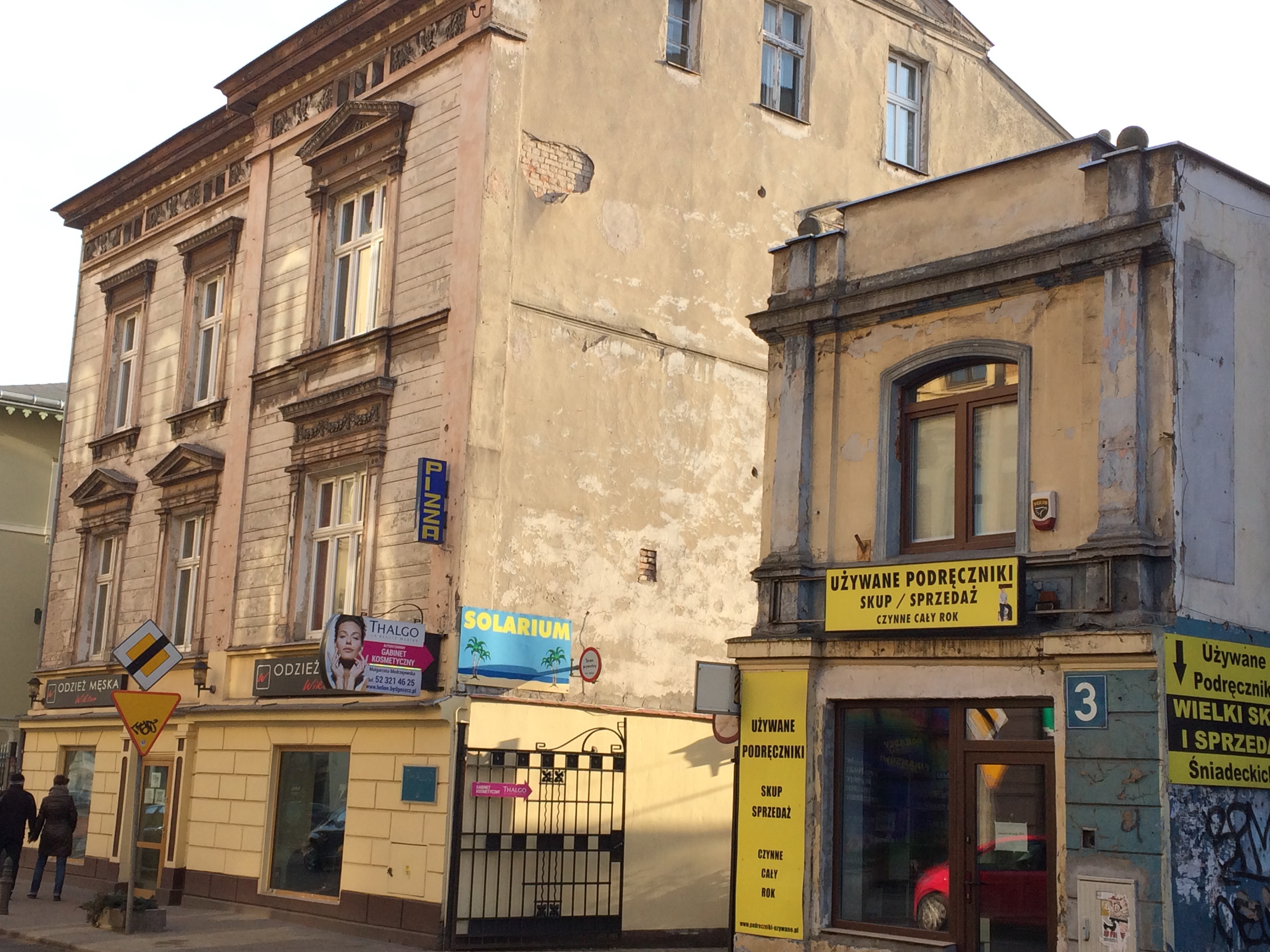
View from the street

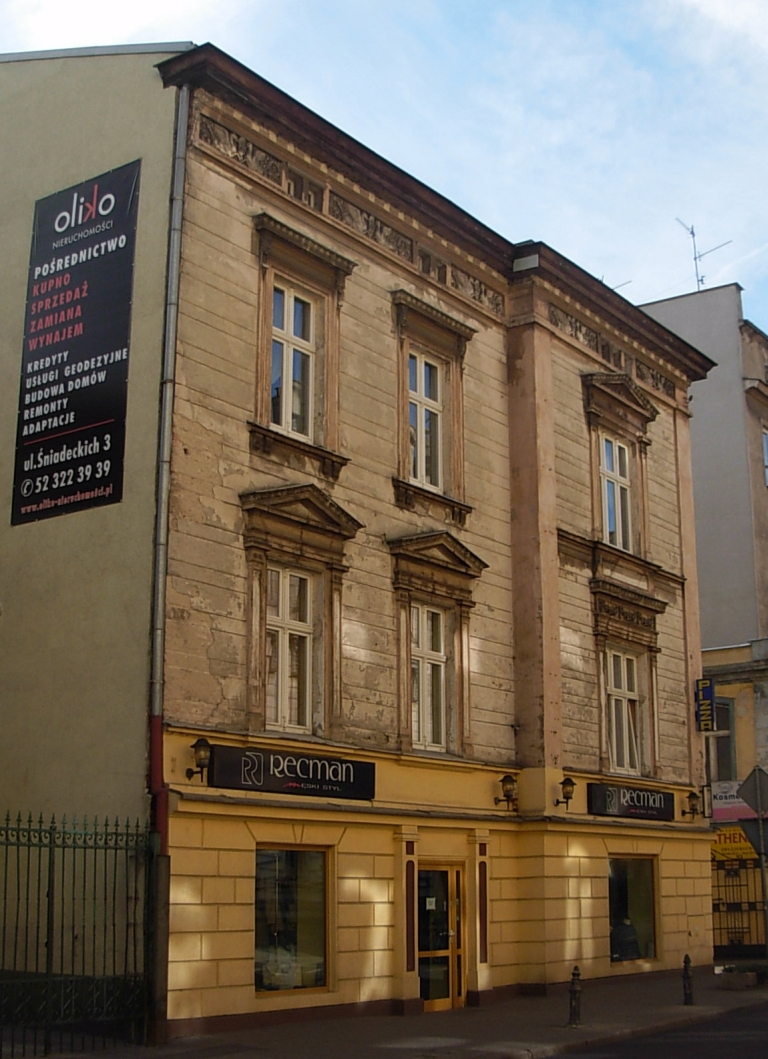
Main frontage

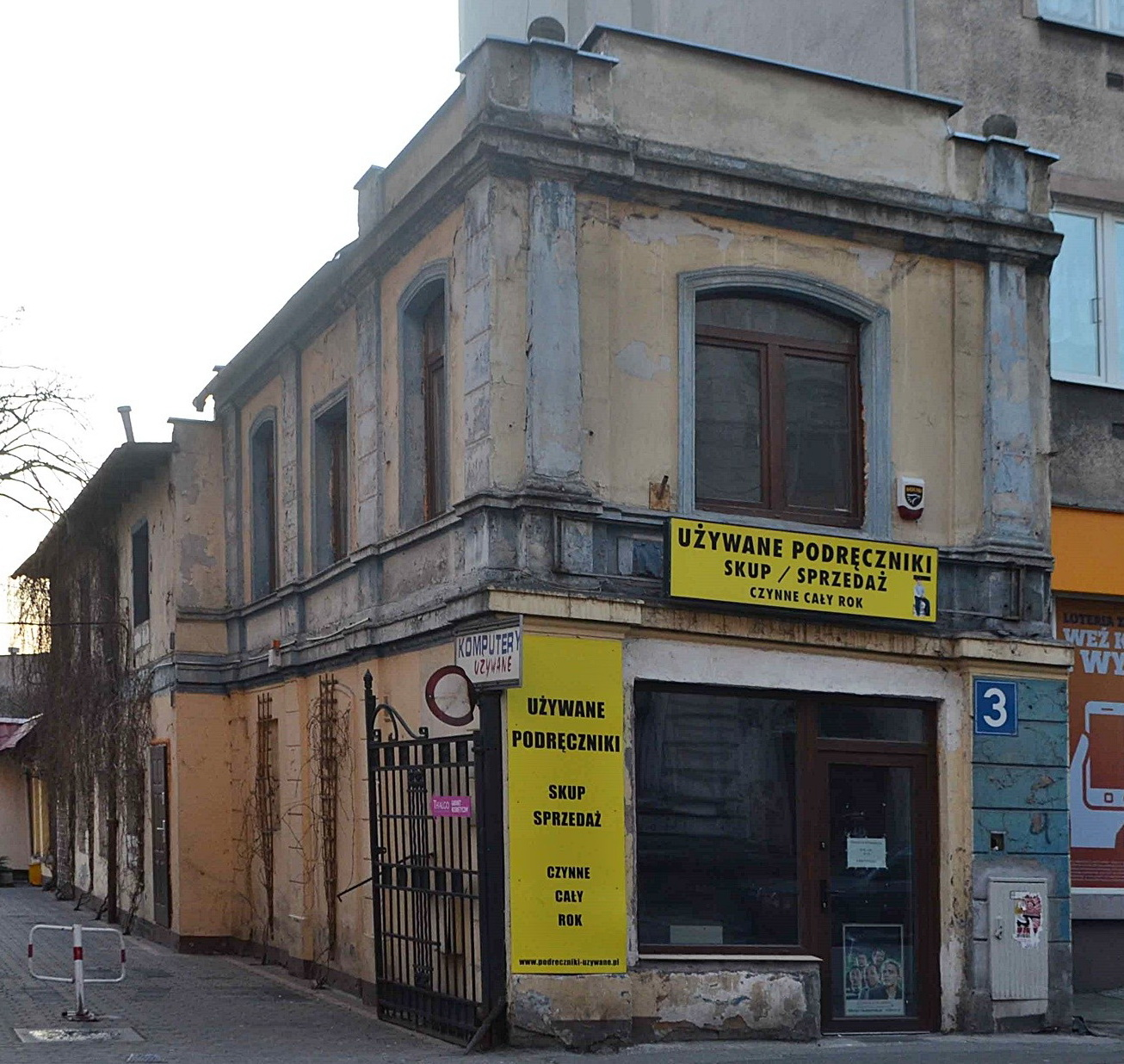
View of the 2nd smaller house

=== Tenement at 4 ===
1891–1893, by Fritz Weidner

Eclecticism-Neo-baroque

One of the most beautifully restored house in 2009. The address at its inception was then Elisabethstraße 55. In 1900, it was the property of Max Zweininger running a famous hat manufactory in Bydgoszcz at 2 Focha street.

The facade teems with architectural details: from the delicately adorned main door, topped by an ornament with a mask and vegetal motifs, part of the bay window crowned by a wrought iron balcony, to windows cartouches and pediments, including shed dormers on the gable.

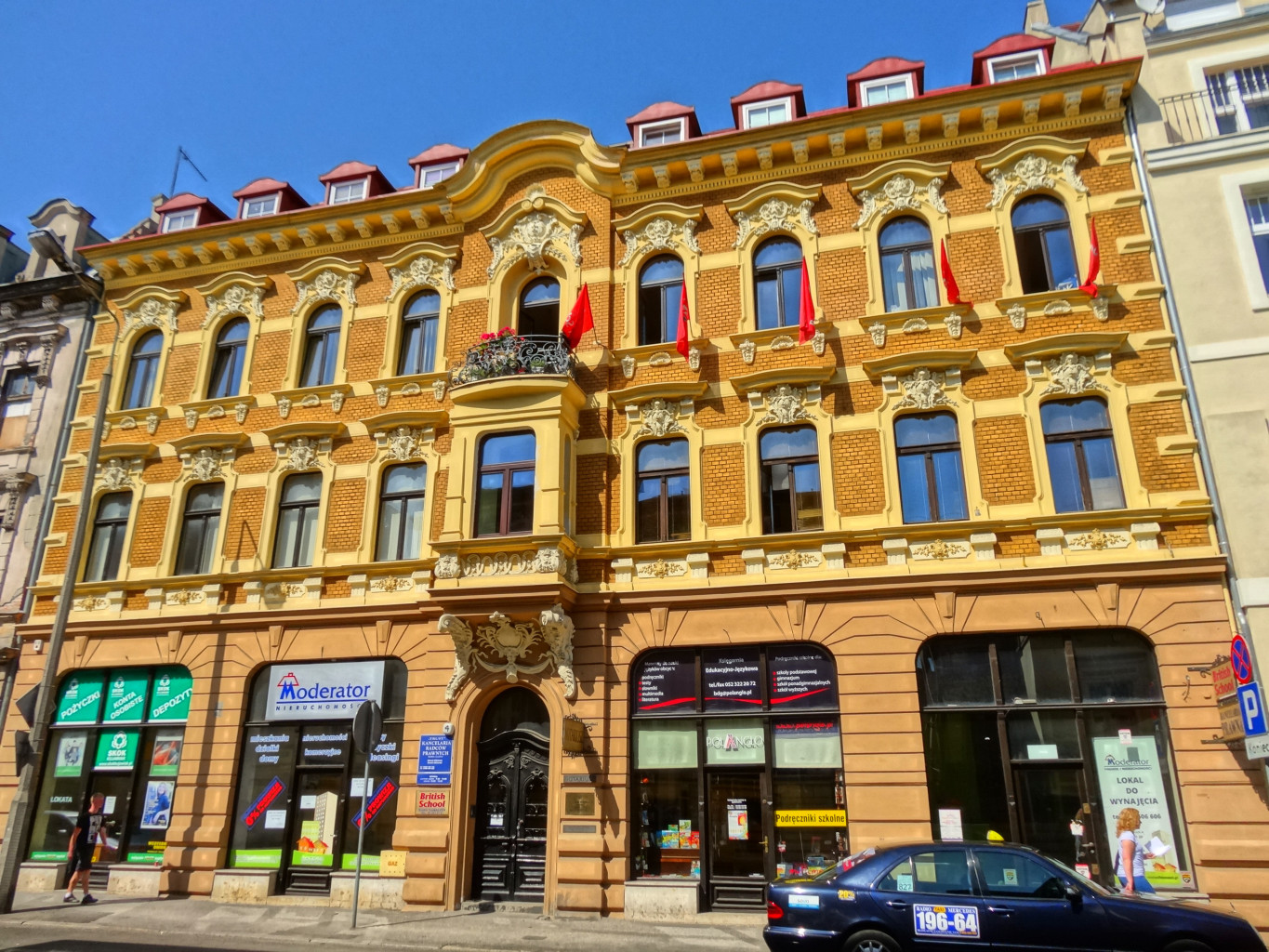
Main facade

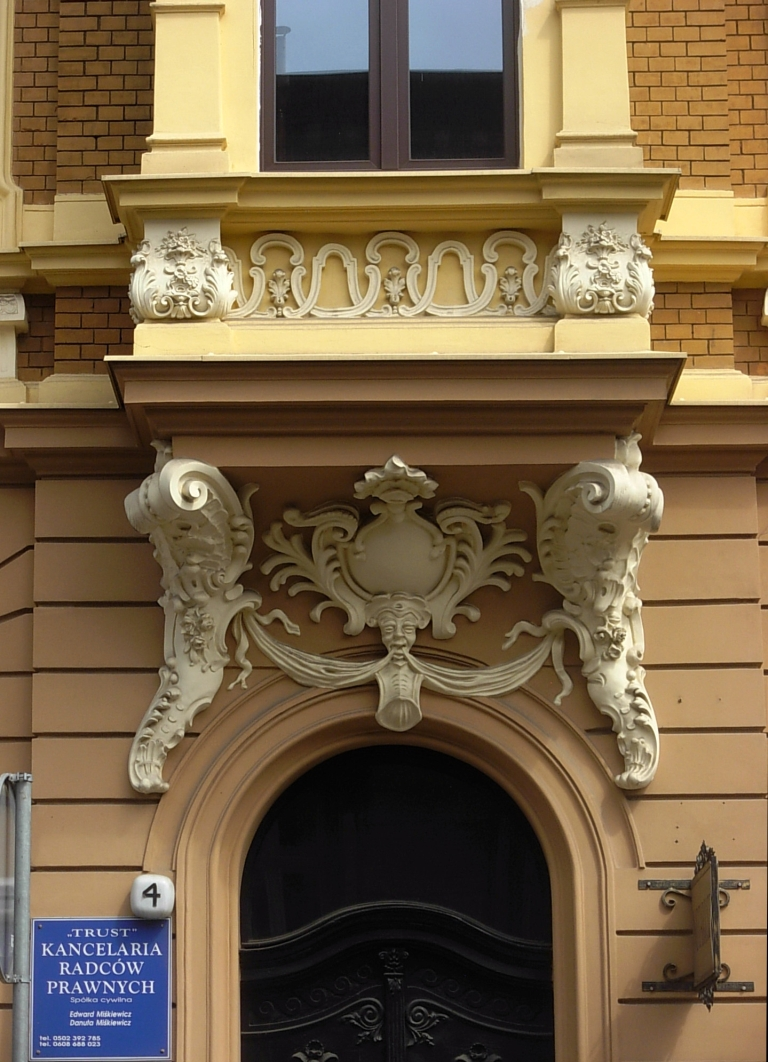
Detail of gate motifs

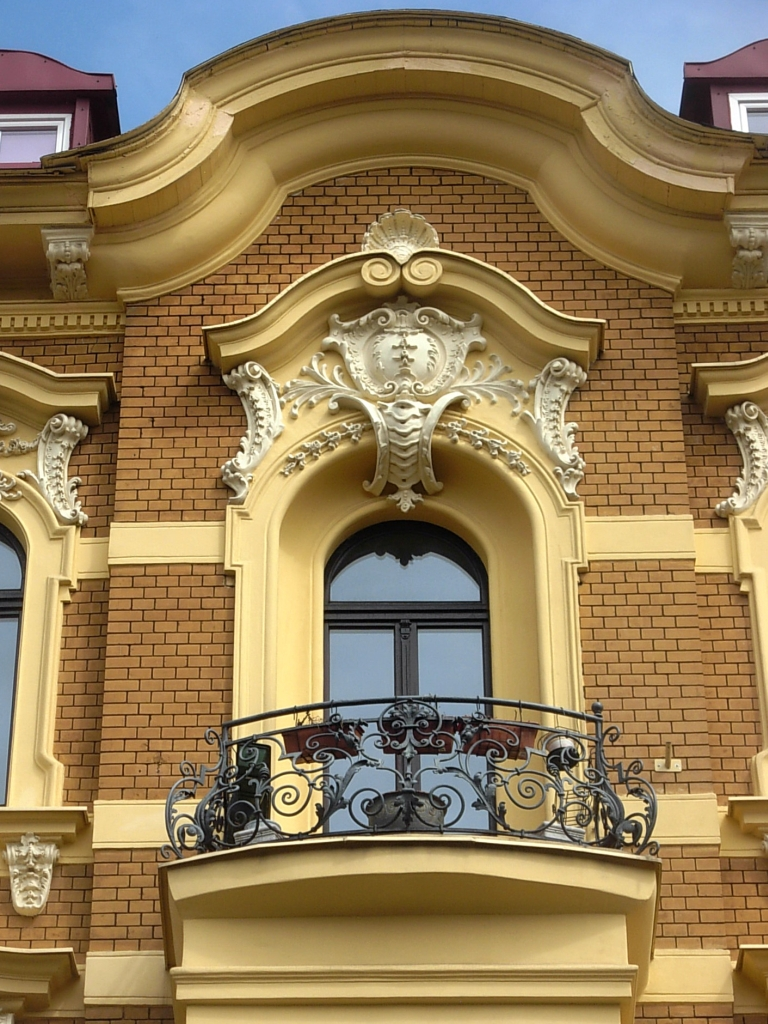
Detail of the top balcony

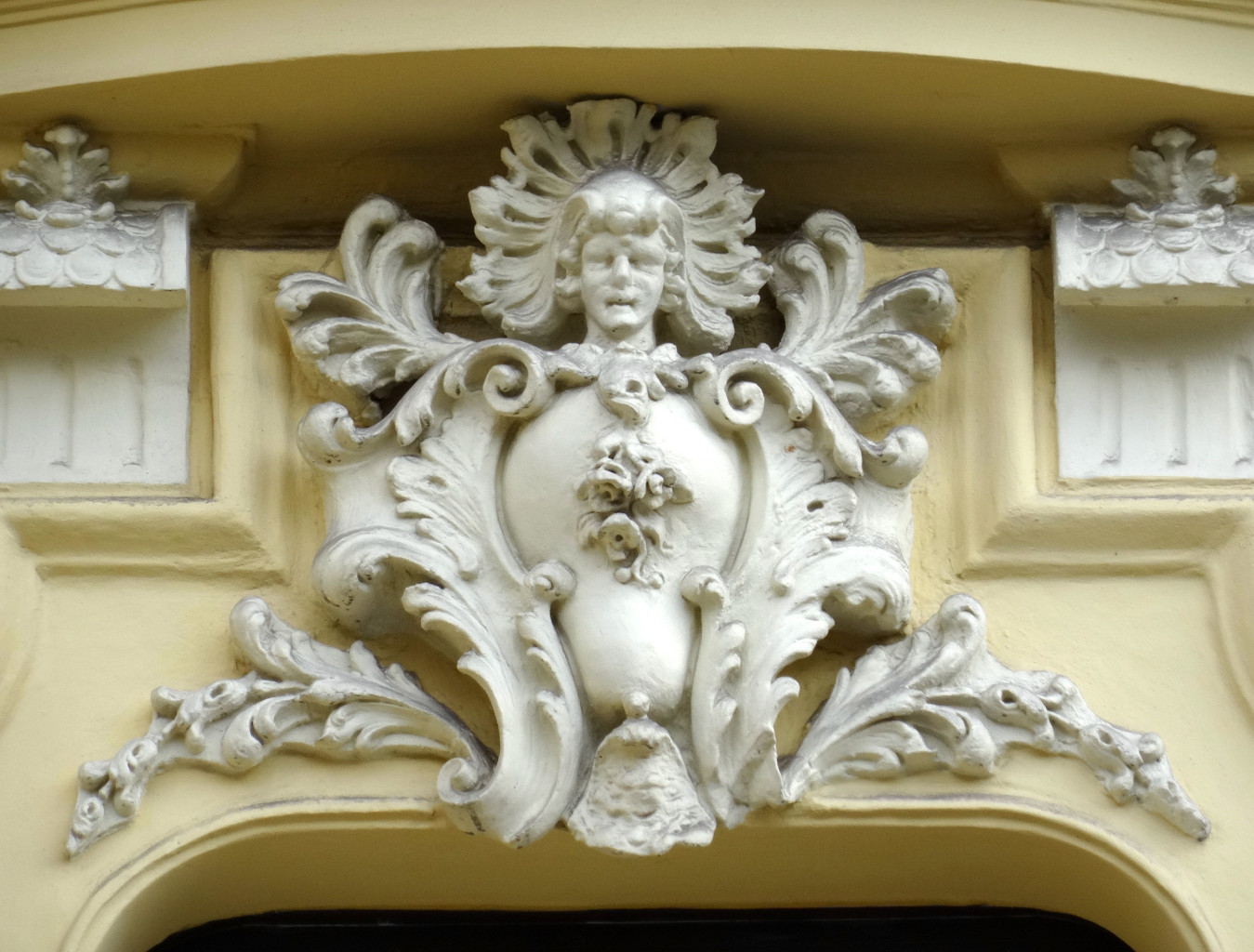
Ornament detail

=== Albert Jahnte tenement, at 6 ===
1895–1896, by Karl Bergner

Eclecticism-Neo-Gothic

The architectural style of the facade is pretty similar to the adjacent one at Nr.4. The first landlord was a merchand, Albert Jahnte. The address of the house was then Elisabethstraße 54.

The facade, which has been overhauled in 2018–2019, a gate, flanked by pilasters and topped by a lion head. Openings are all ornamented with garland-shape pediment, an ogee gable bearing a Hermes head crowns the edifice.

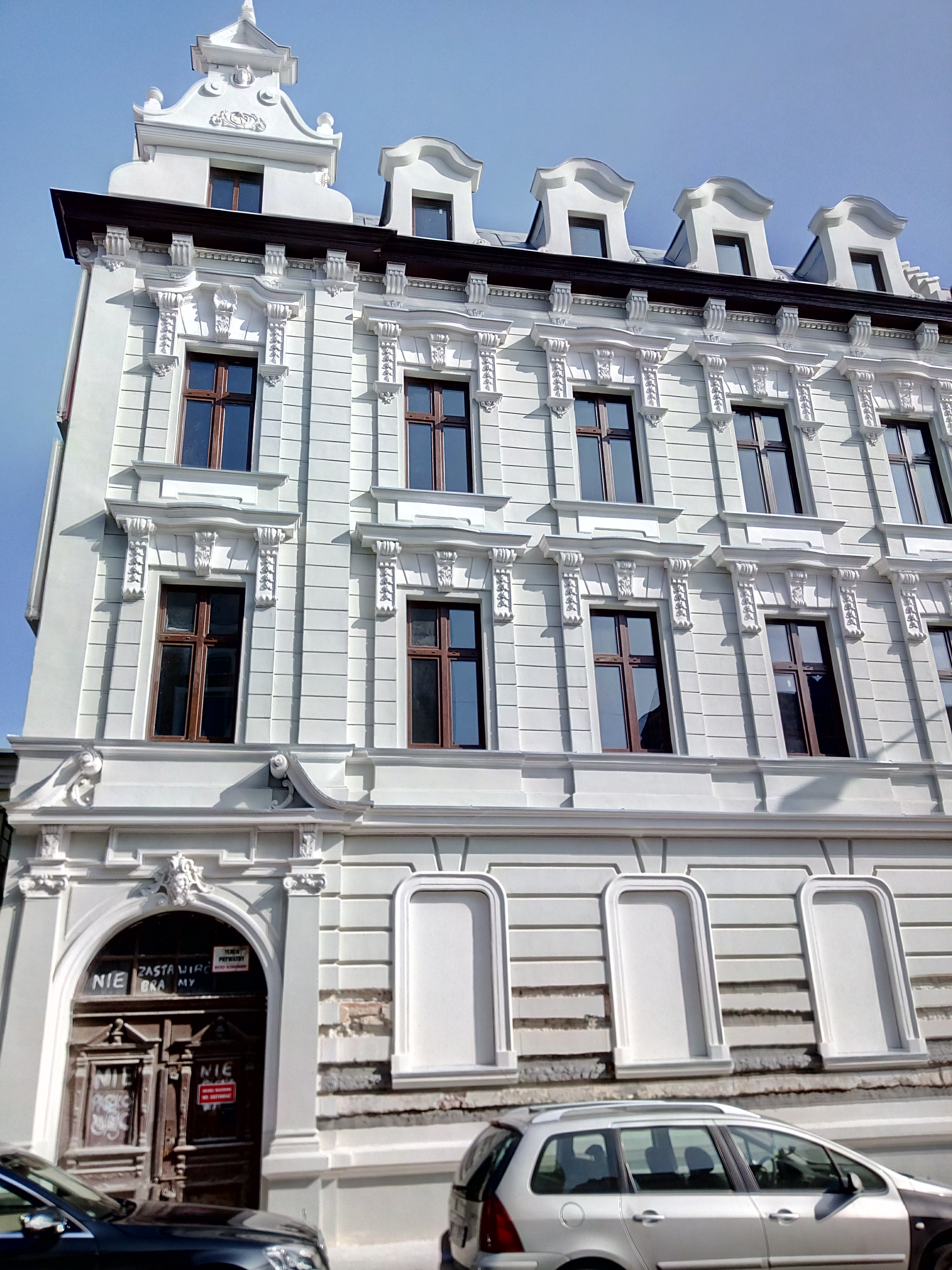
Renovated facade

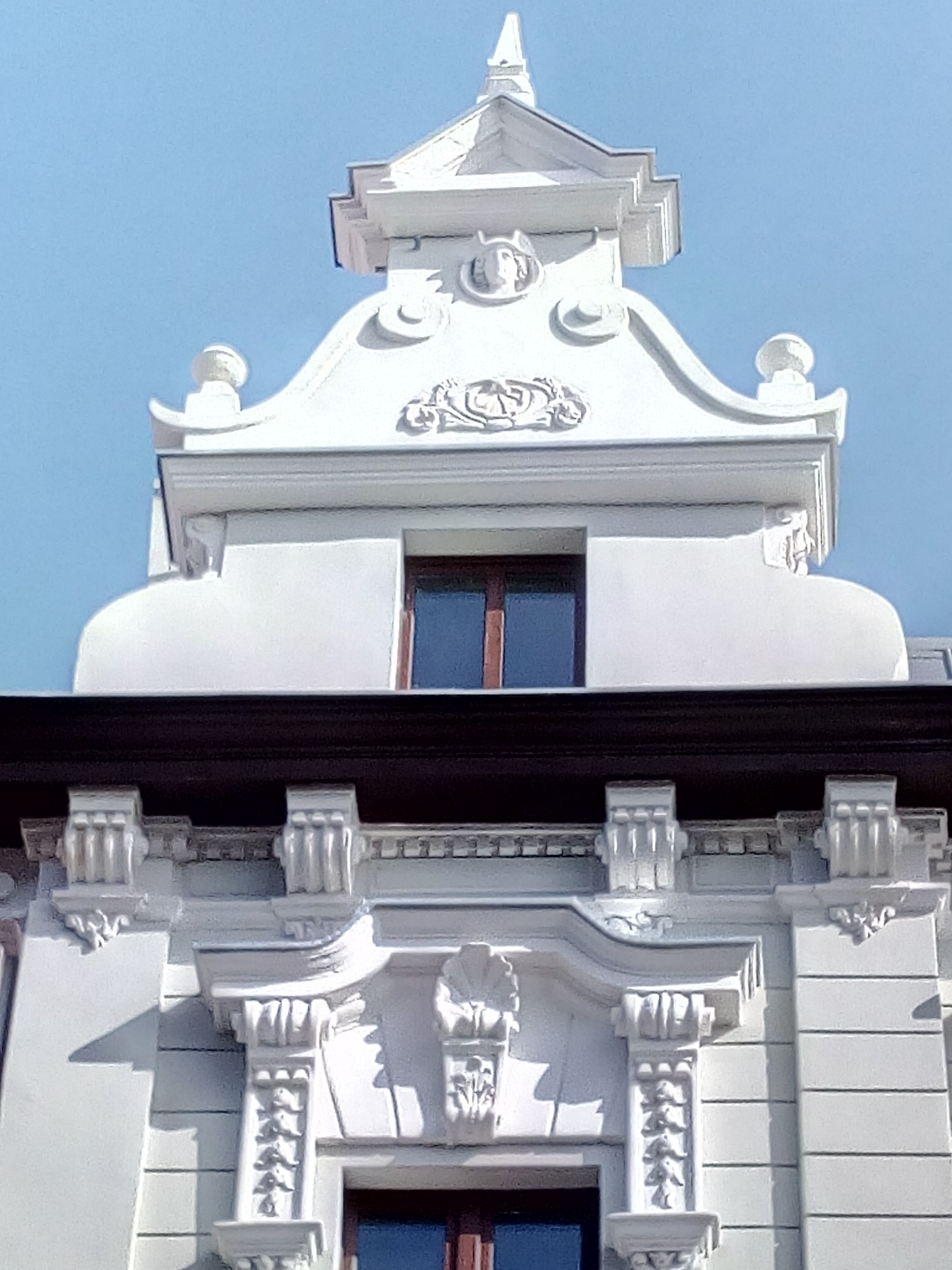
Adorned Wall gable

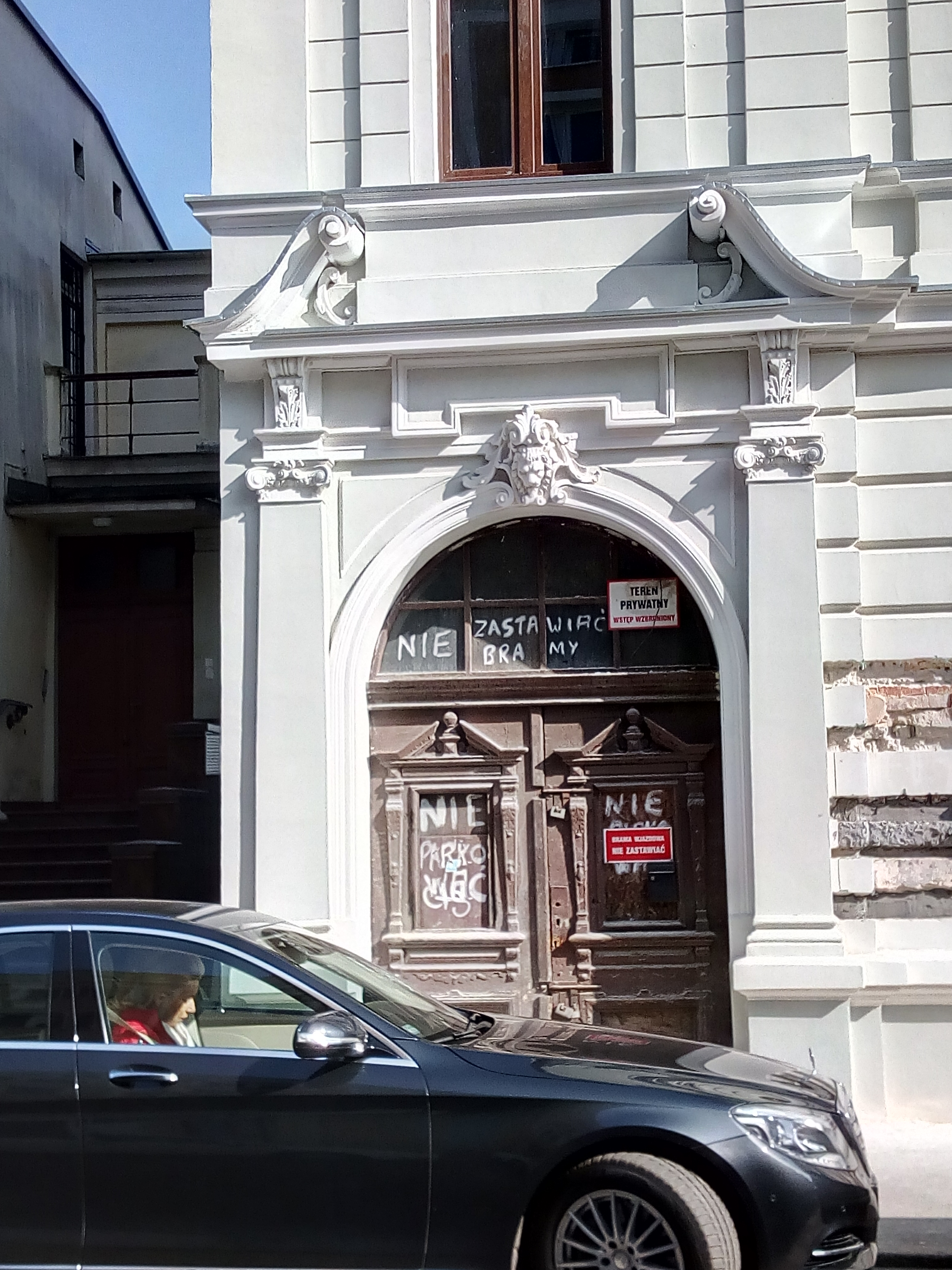
Portal and door

=== Tenement at 7 ===
1887

Eclecticism, Neo-Renaissance

The first landlord was Herman Marckmann, a baker. The address of the house was then Elisabethstraße 5. Herman Marckmann was also owner of the tenement at Elisabethstraße 5a, now Nr.9: he lived there until the end of World War I.

The elevation is rather simple with regards to architectural details: long vertical lines are contested by a long horizontal frieze at the top and simplistic pediments at windows, as well as a slight avant-corps to highlight the gate.

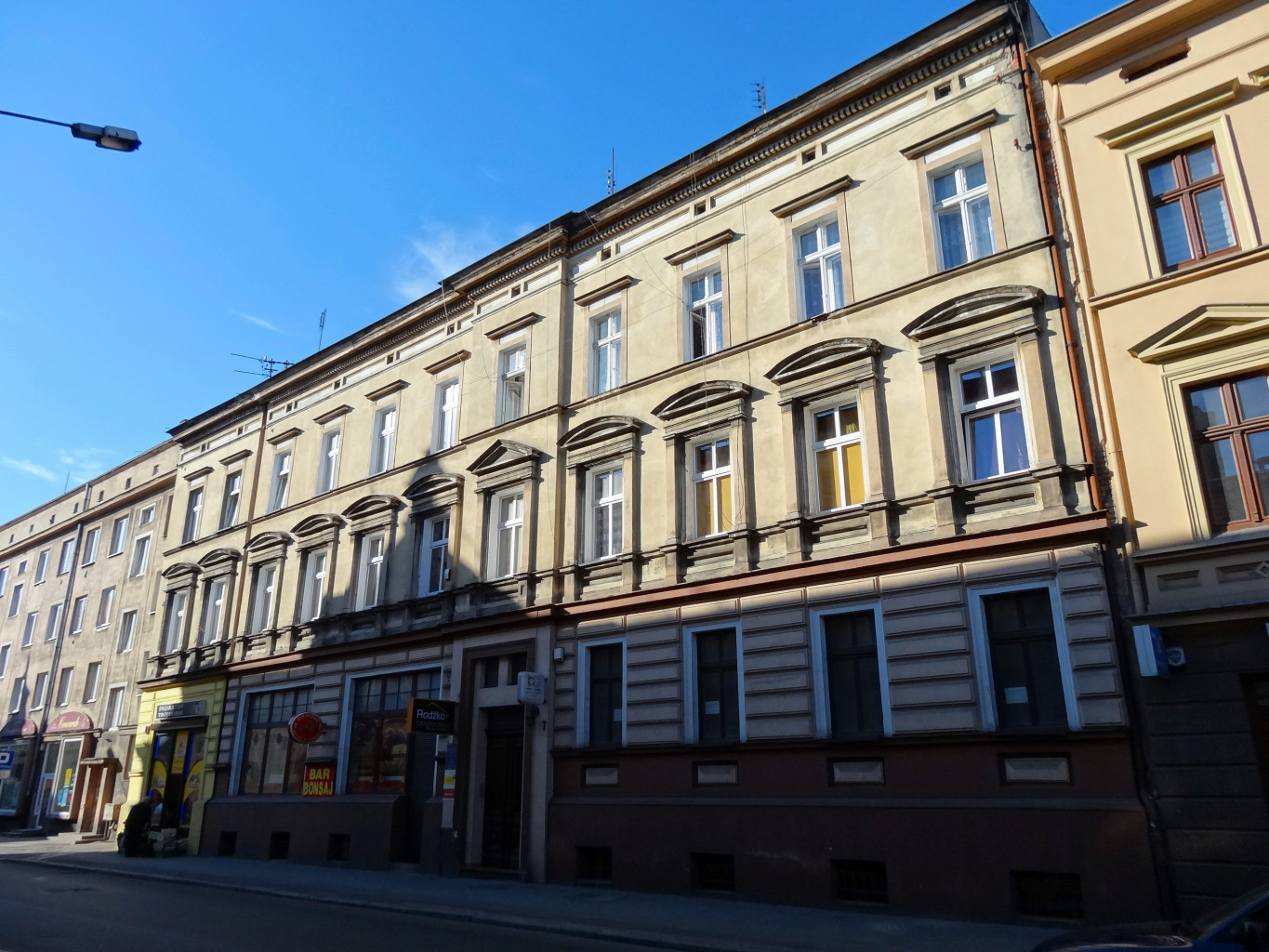
Main facade

=== Tenement at 8 ===
1860s

Eclecticism-Neo-baroque

The site has been vacant till 1887: the landlord was the owner of tenement at Nr.6, Albert Jahnte. The address of the plot was then Elisabethstraße 53. Since May 18, 2014, the building houses a temple of The Church of Jesus Christ of Latter-day Saints.

The frontage onto the street may seem rather limited, the house area however is more than 310 m^{2}. Wrought-iron works worth noticing are present on top of the gable and around the balcony crowning the avant-corps.

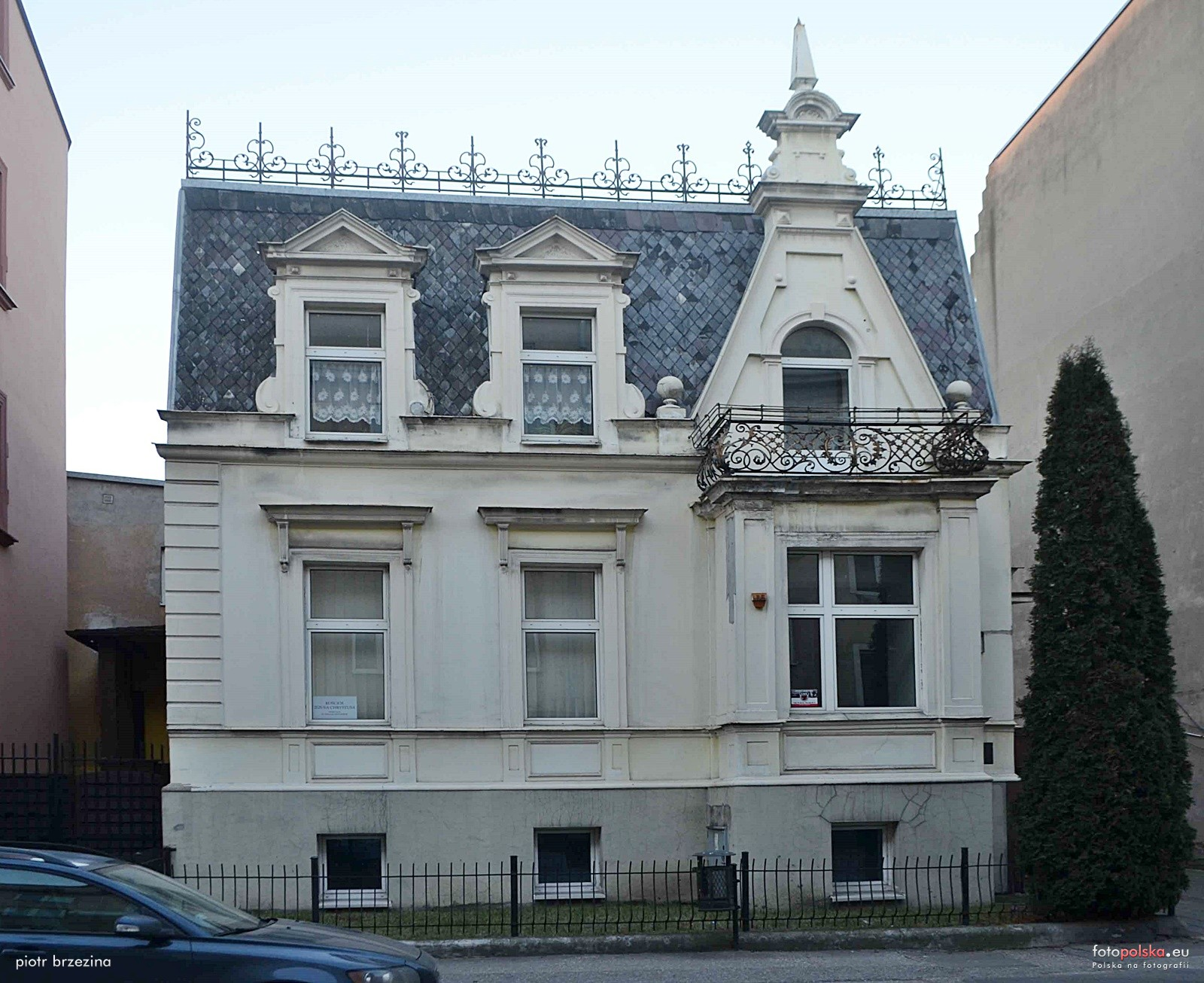
Main view from Śniadeckich street

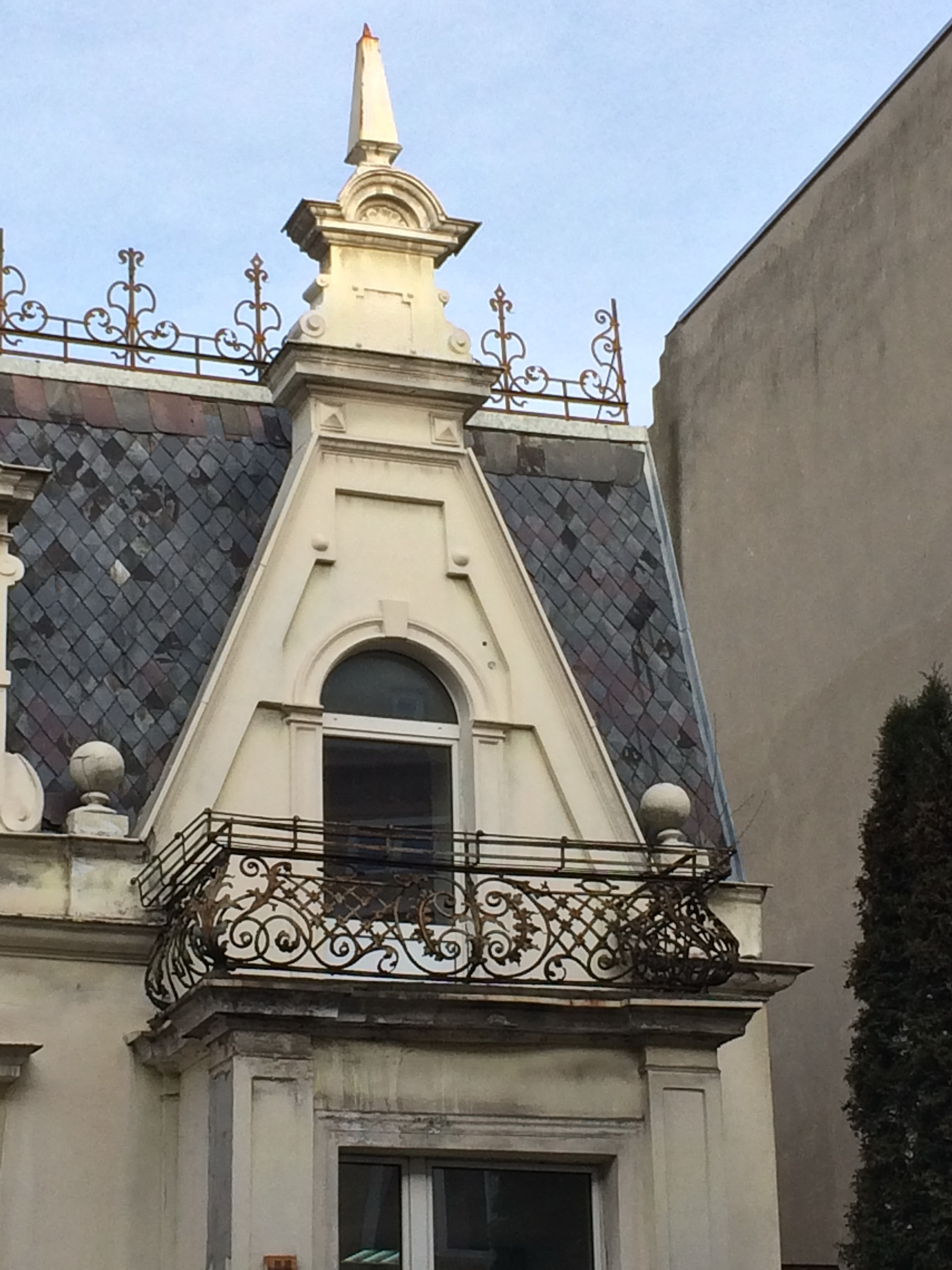
Detail of gable and finial

=== Karl Bergner tenement, at 10 ===
Registered on Kuyavian-Pomeranian Voivodeship heritage list, Nr.601420, Reg. A/1065, June 28, 1995

1895–1897, by Karl Bergner

Eclecticism, Neo-Gothic

The architect Karl Bergner moved there after completion of the building at Elisabethstraße 52a, leaving his previous realization he was living in with his family in Gdańska Street.

Elements worth noticing are the adorned gate, the ground floor loggia topped by a terrace and the majestically decorated bartizan crowned by a finial.

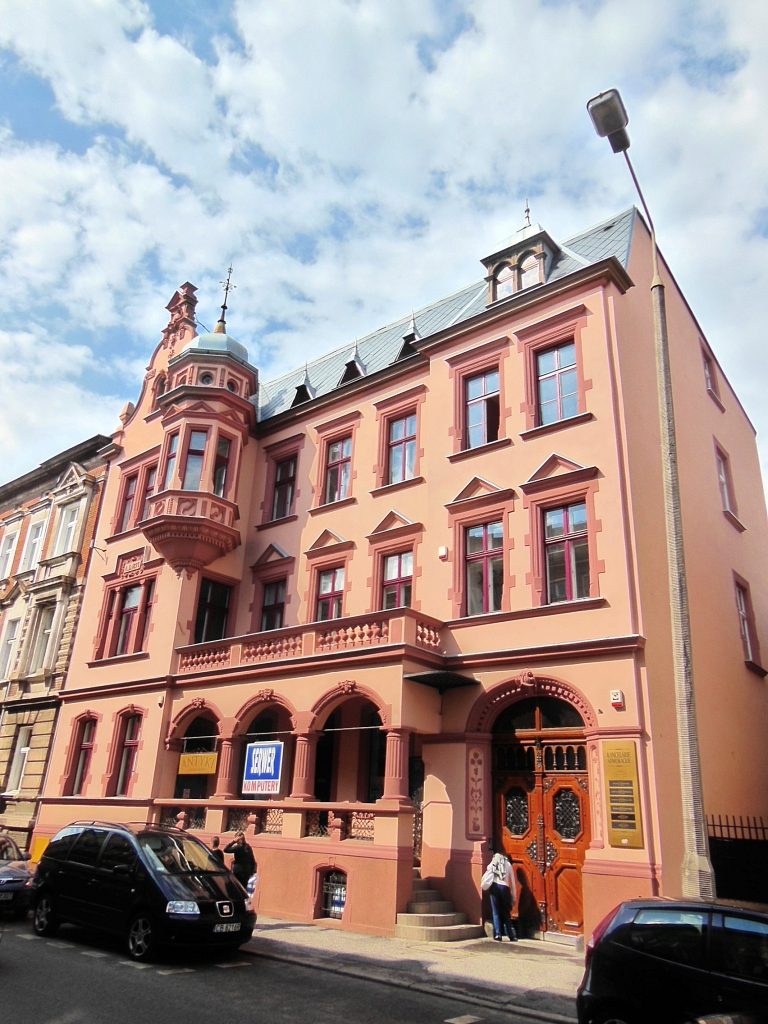
Main view from Śniadeckich street

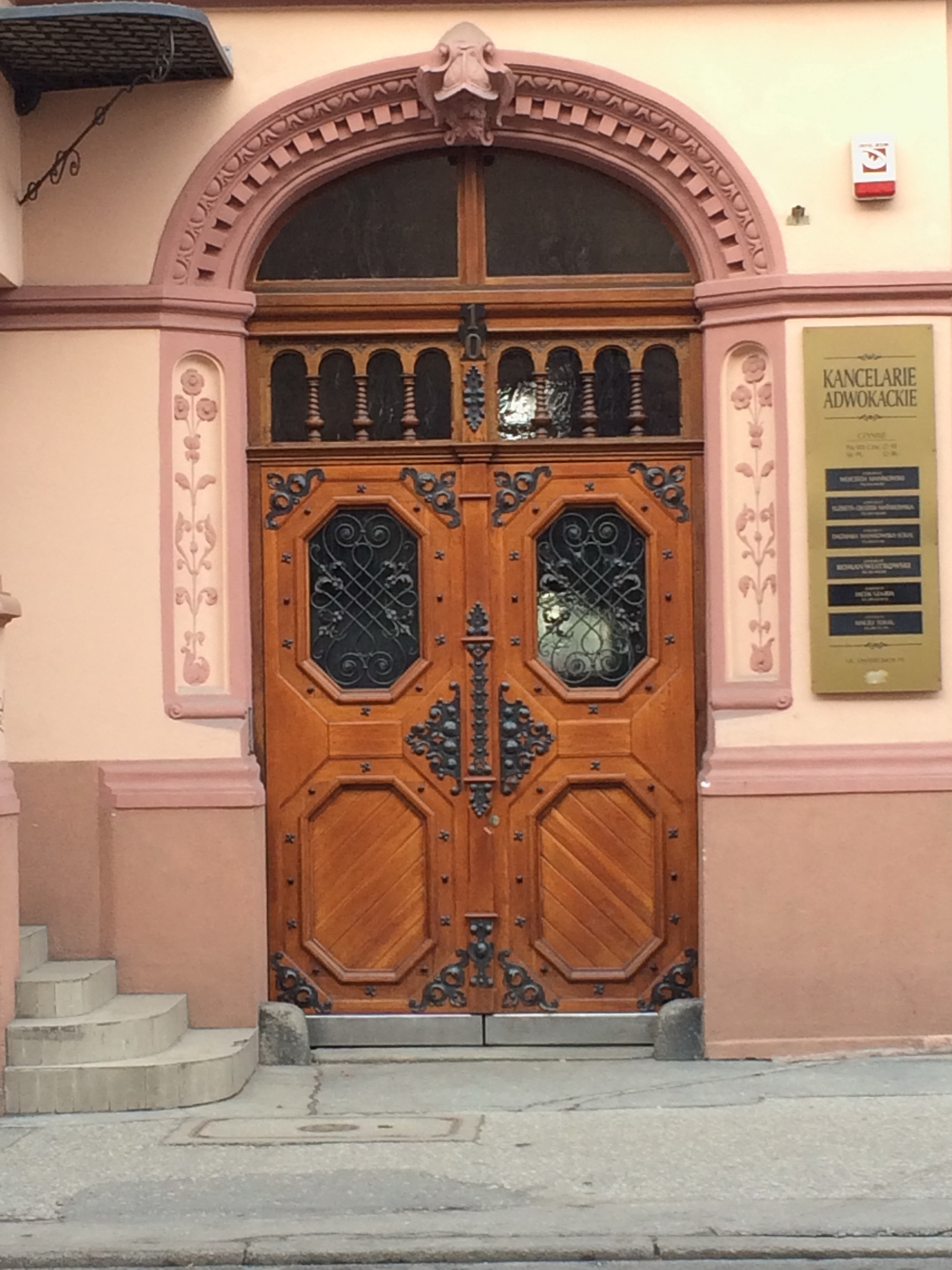
Portal

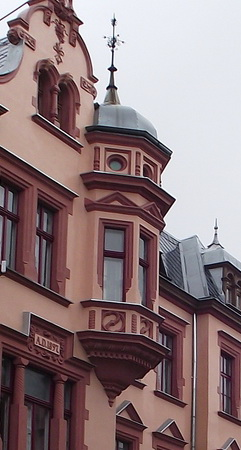
Bartizan

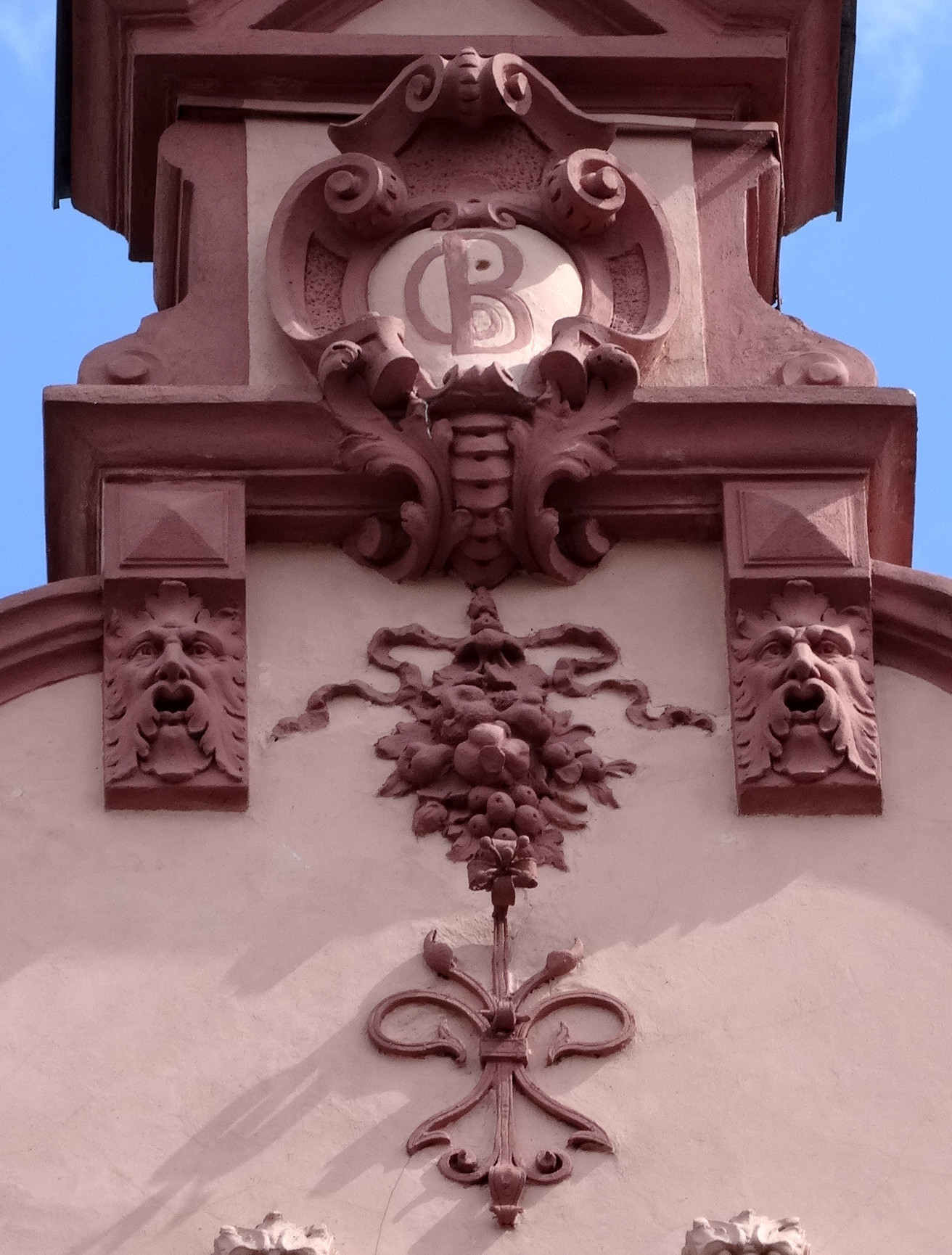
Initials for K(C)arl Bergner

=== August Freitwald tenement, at 12 ===
1892–1893, by Karl Bergner

Eclecticism-Neo-Renaissance

August Freitwald, a master shoemaker, lived there, then Elisabethstraße 52. He owned this tenement along with building on the left, now Nr.14 and 16. In the 1920s, the tenement was inhabited by displaced Poles that left former eastern territories as a consequence of the Peace of Riga: nobles, doctors, officers. Among them were Wiktor and Anna von Helmersen: she set up a Charity kitchen (borderland cuisine) for these refugees, changed in 1927 to Kitchen for the indigent (Polish: Kuchnia dla niezamożnej inteligencji). Premises were first located at 5 Pomorska Street, then moved to 17 Cieszkowski Street.

The balanced facade is underlined by bossage, a bay window enhanced by corner columns and topped by a small terrace, and two series of openings (left and right) adorned with columns and lintel on the first floor and with pilasters and pediment on the second floor.

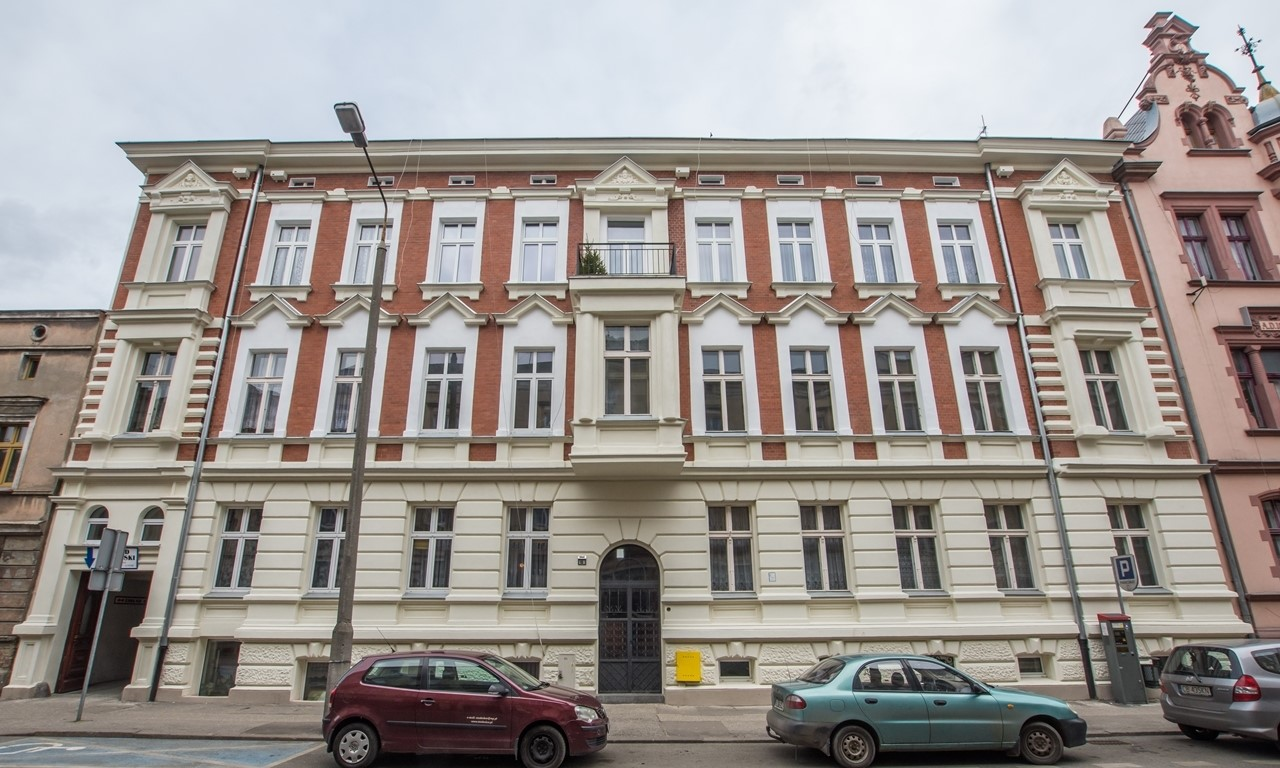
Main elevation

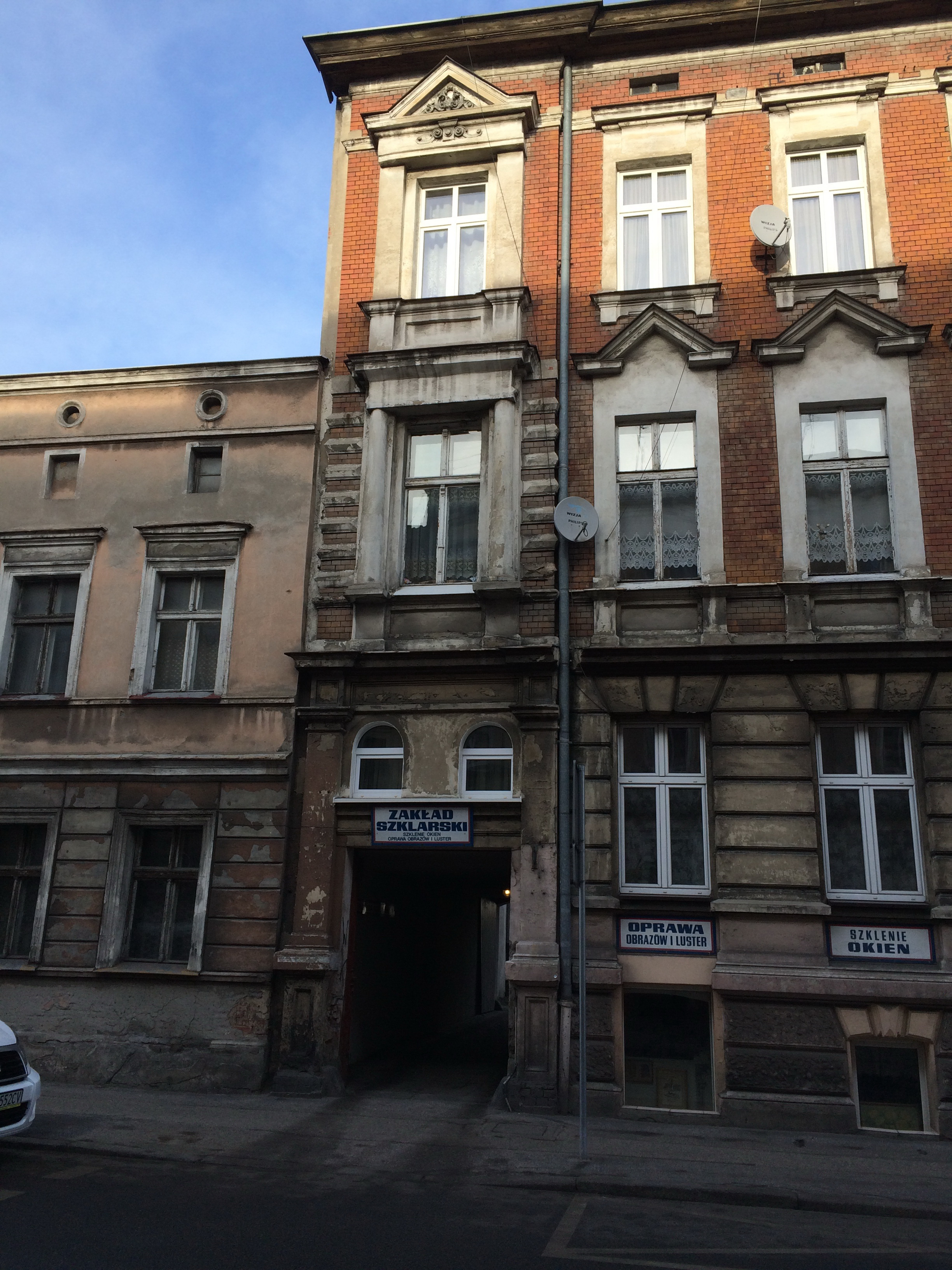
Facade detail

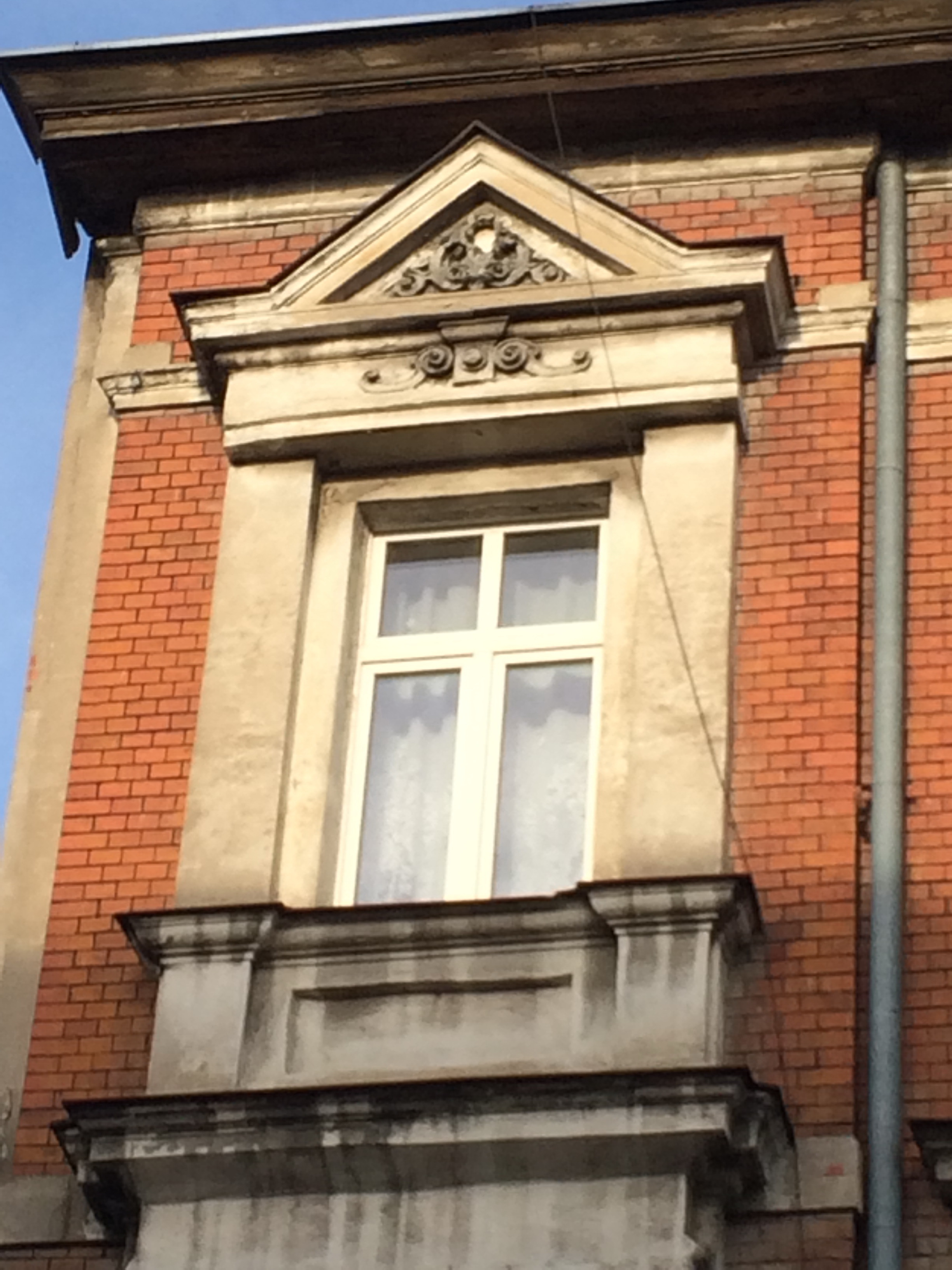
Window adornament

=== Tenement at Nr.13/15 ===
1880

Eclecticism

The building at then Elisabethstraße 7 has been owned by rentiers for a long time in the late 19th century, in particularly the Wolter family.

The facade features are stressed by two bay windows with balustrade, various window pediments and delicately adorned cartouches displaying sitting figures.

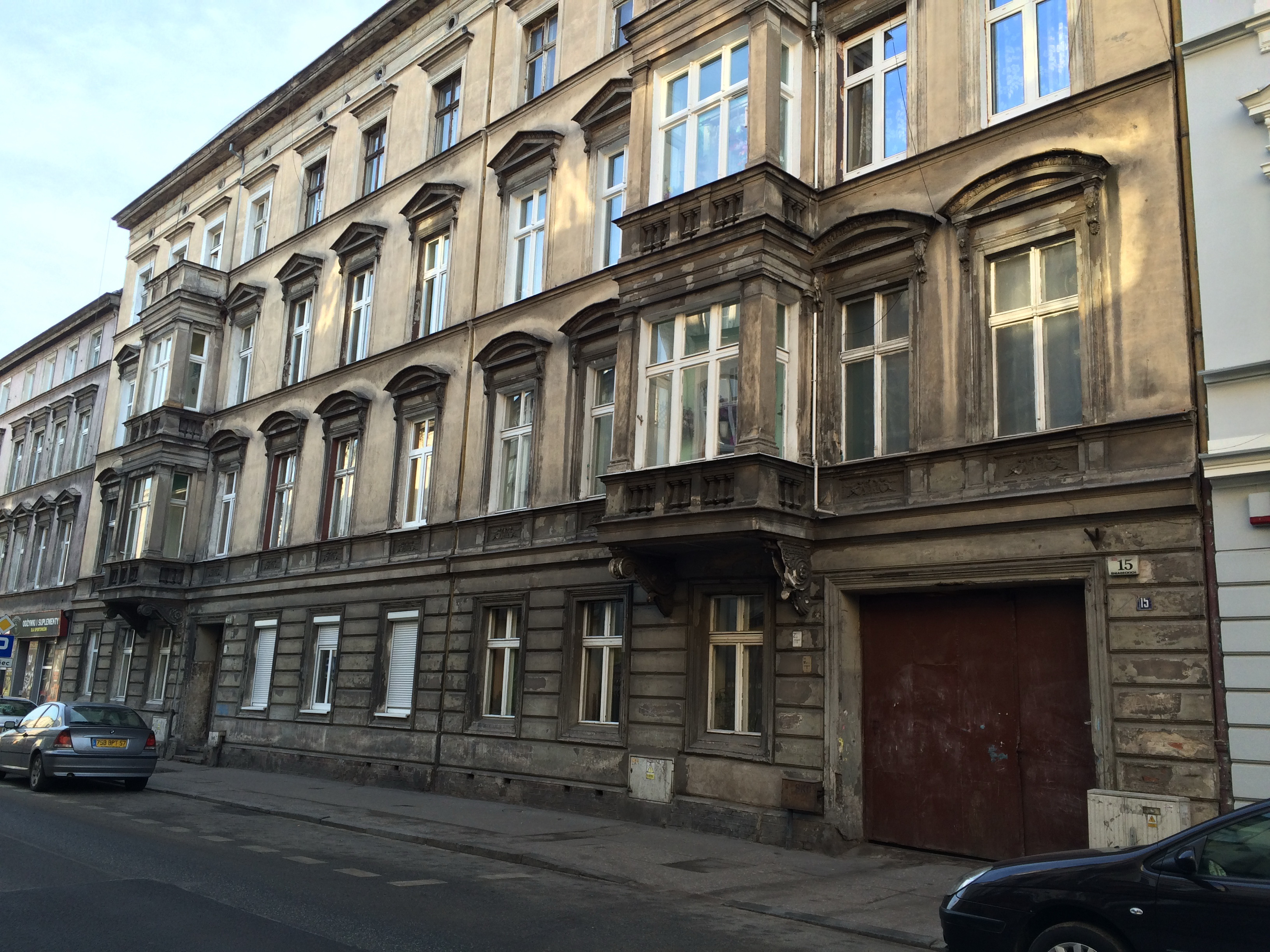
Main elevation on the street

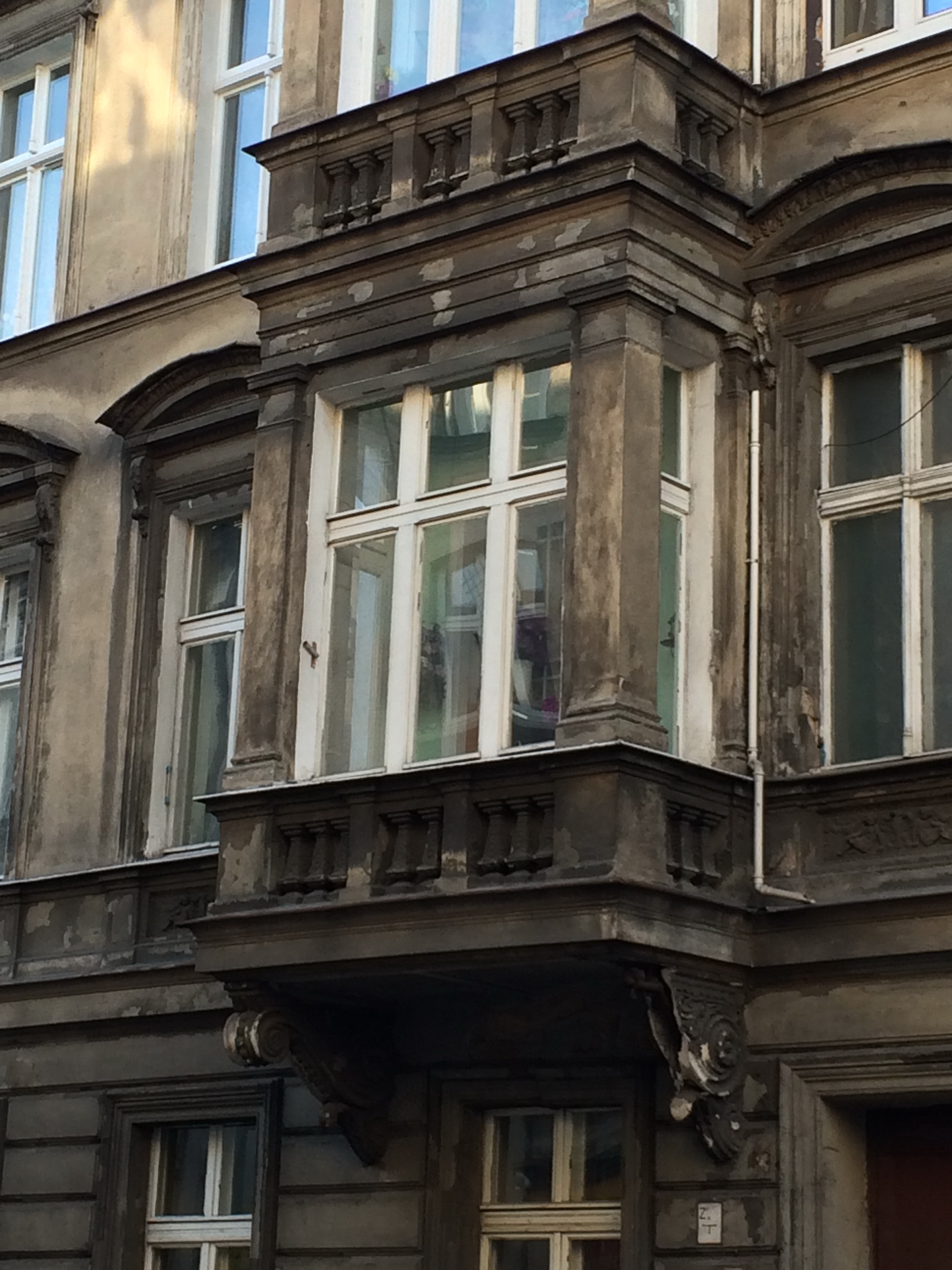
Bay window at Nr.15

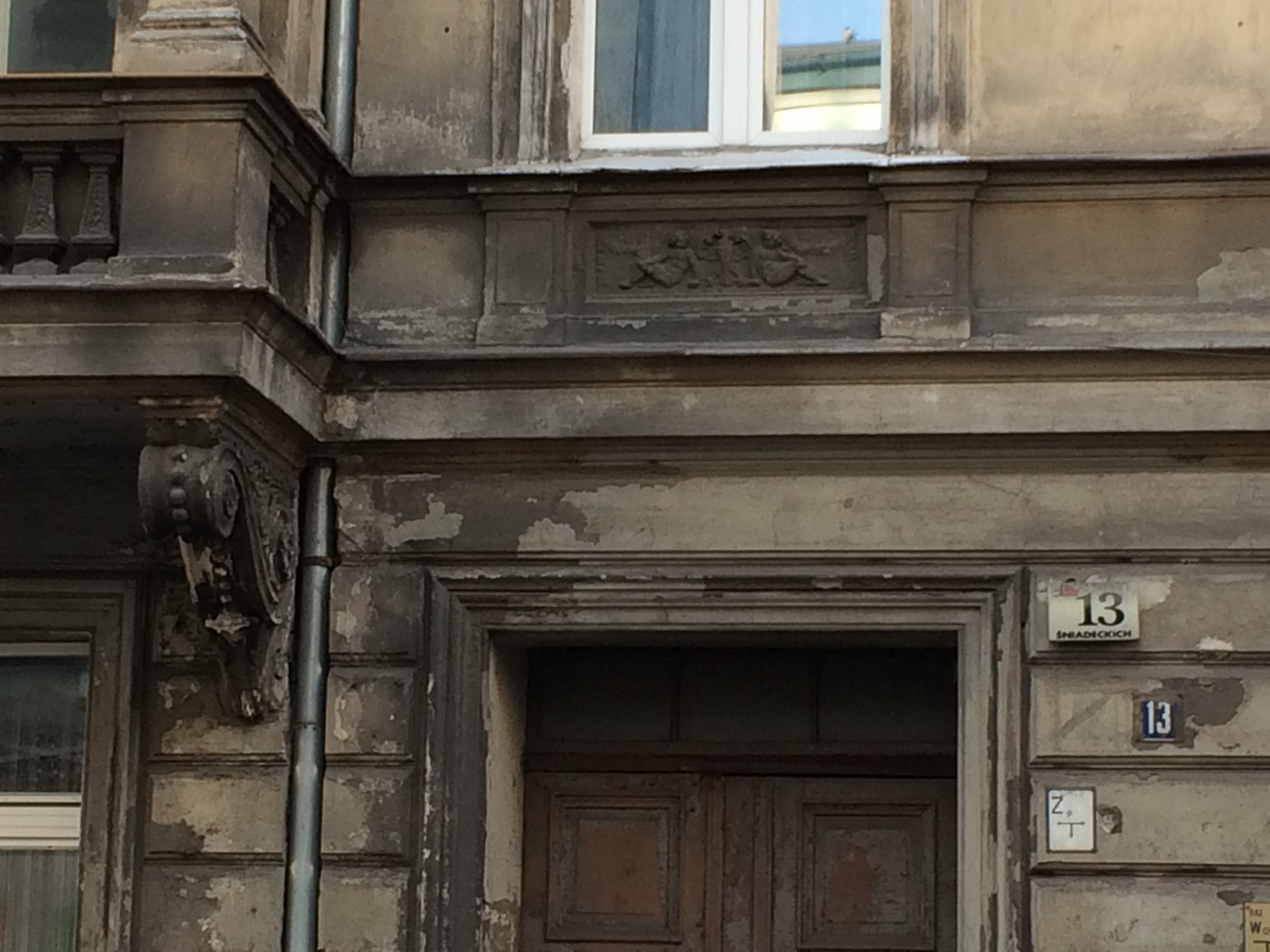
Detail of a cartouche motif at Nr.13

=== Tenement at 17 ===
1896

Eclecticism

This tenement, then at Elisabethstraße 8, was owned by a baker, Georg Schmid.

The neo-classic facade presents nice elements: pediments on all openings, delicate festoons, pilasters and a corbel table on top.

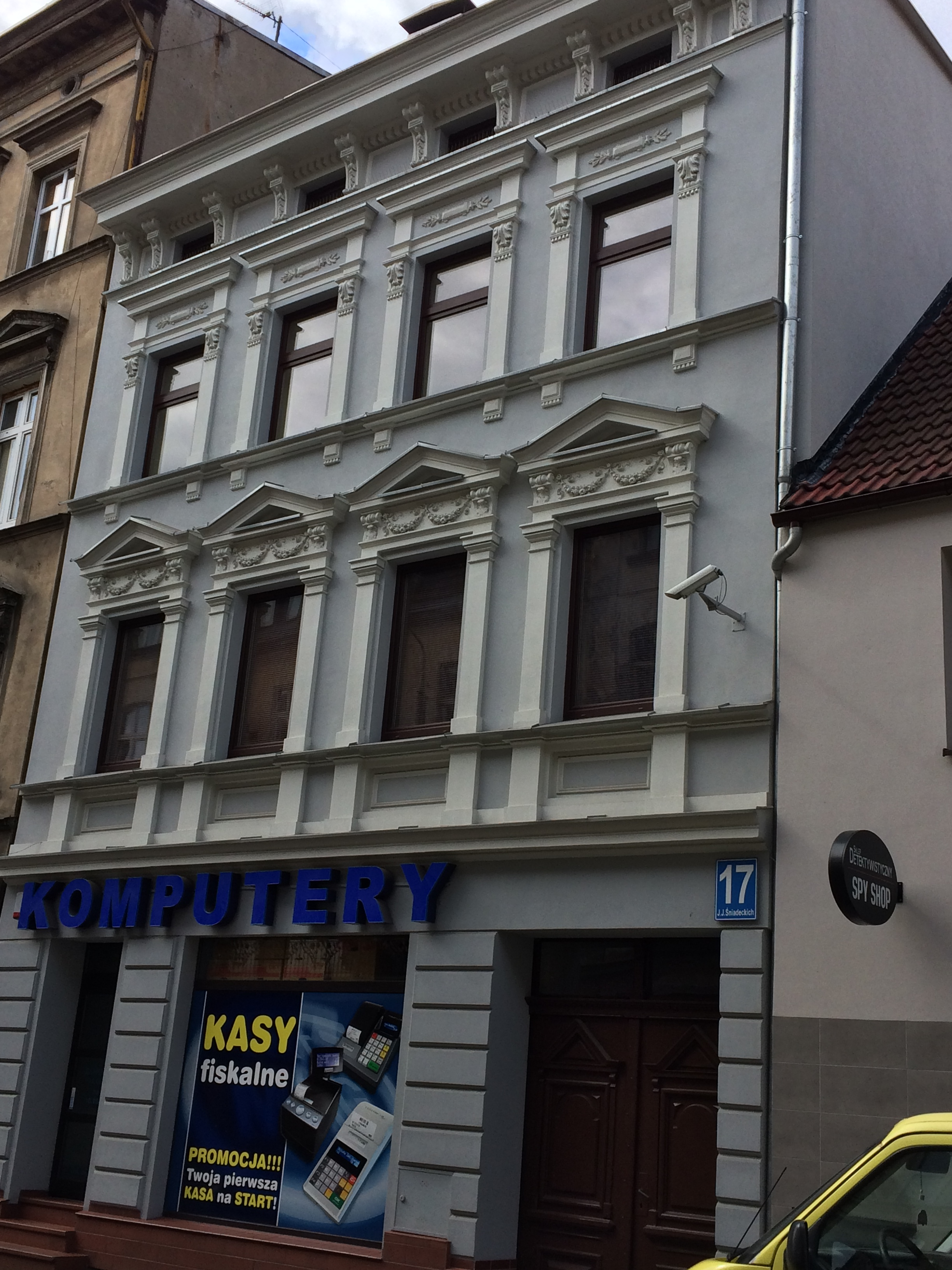
Main frontage

=== Tenement at 18, corner with Pomorska Street ===
1889-1890

Eclecticism, Neo-Renaissance

August Freitwald, a master shoemaker, owned this building which address was then Elisabethstraße 51 until 1910.

The architecture reflects main features of end of 19th century Eclecticism, so present in the streets of Bydgoszcz (e.g. Dworcowa Street, Gdańska Street). One can notice a lot of motifs adorning windows, those on the first floor are topped with triangular pediments containing angel faces. Corbels are present on the second floor and at the top of the facade, supporting the roof.

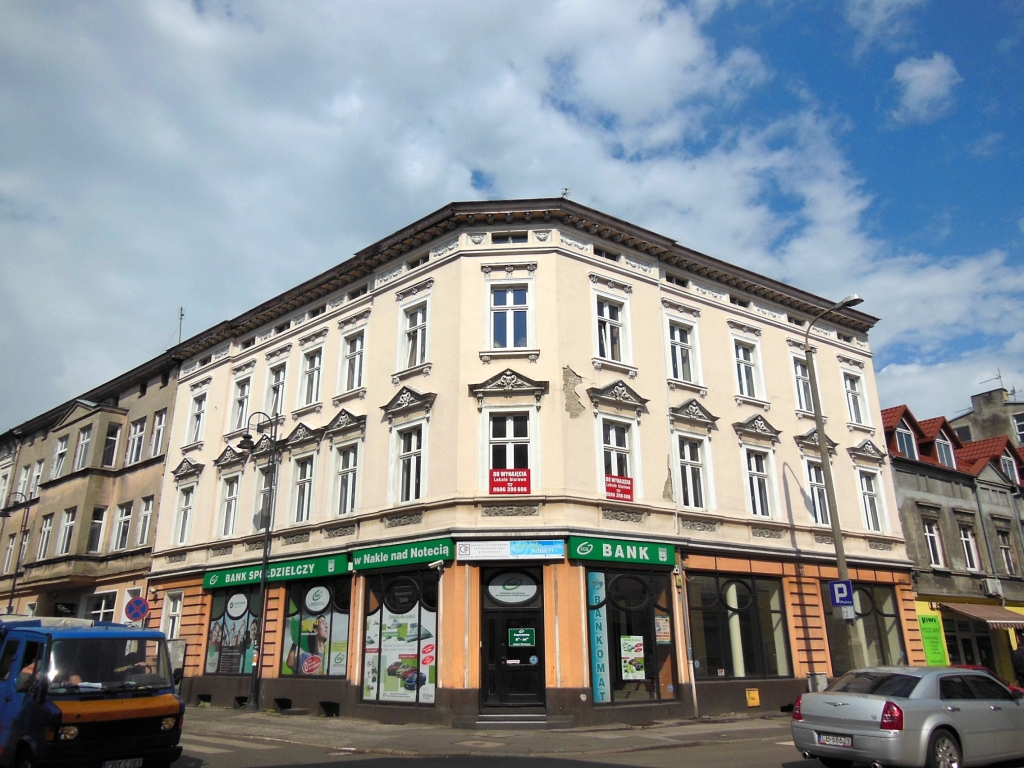
Main facades

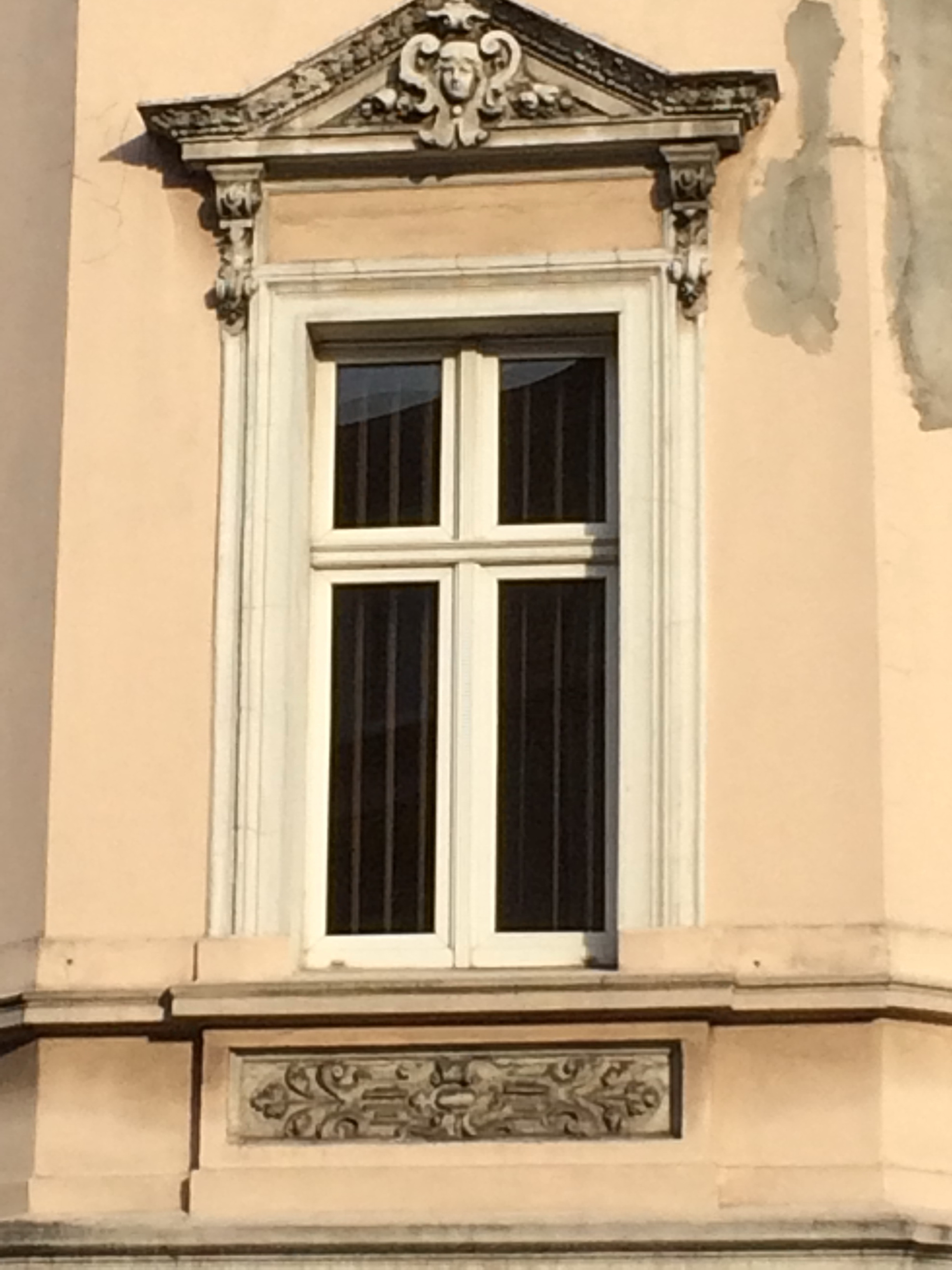
Detail of cartouche (design) and pediment

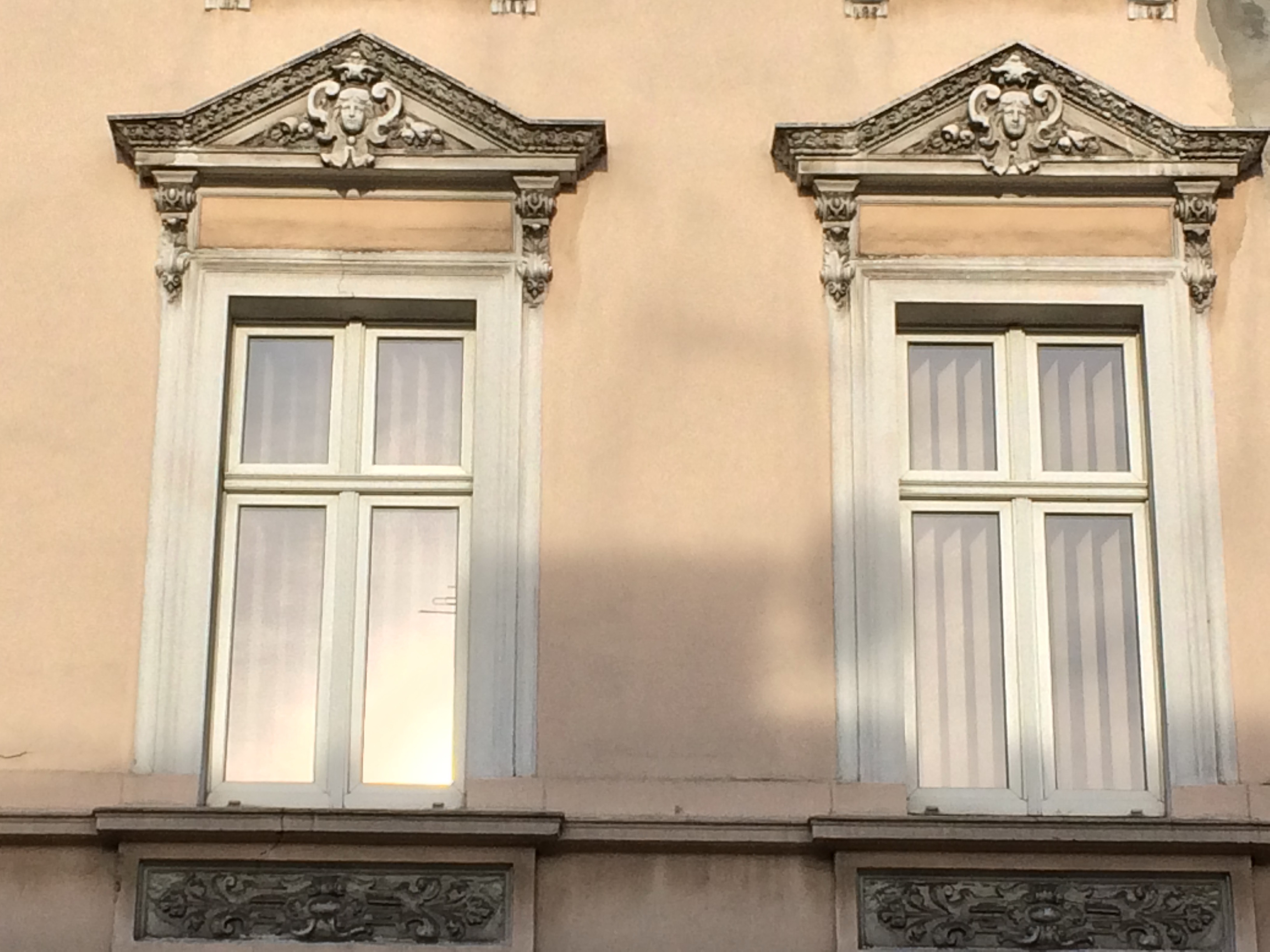
Facade details

=== Tenement at 20, corner with Pomorska Street ===
1893, by Karl Bergner

Eclecticism, Neo-Renaissance

August Freitwald, a master shoemaker owned this building which address was then Elisabethstraße 50, also landlord of Nr.18.

The architecture of Nr.20 largely mirrors the tenement across the street at Nr.18: main differences are located on the corner with a grand pediment crowning the top and a large bay window-balcony over the main entry. The topping pediment has a globe with the house completion date.

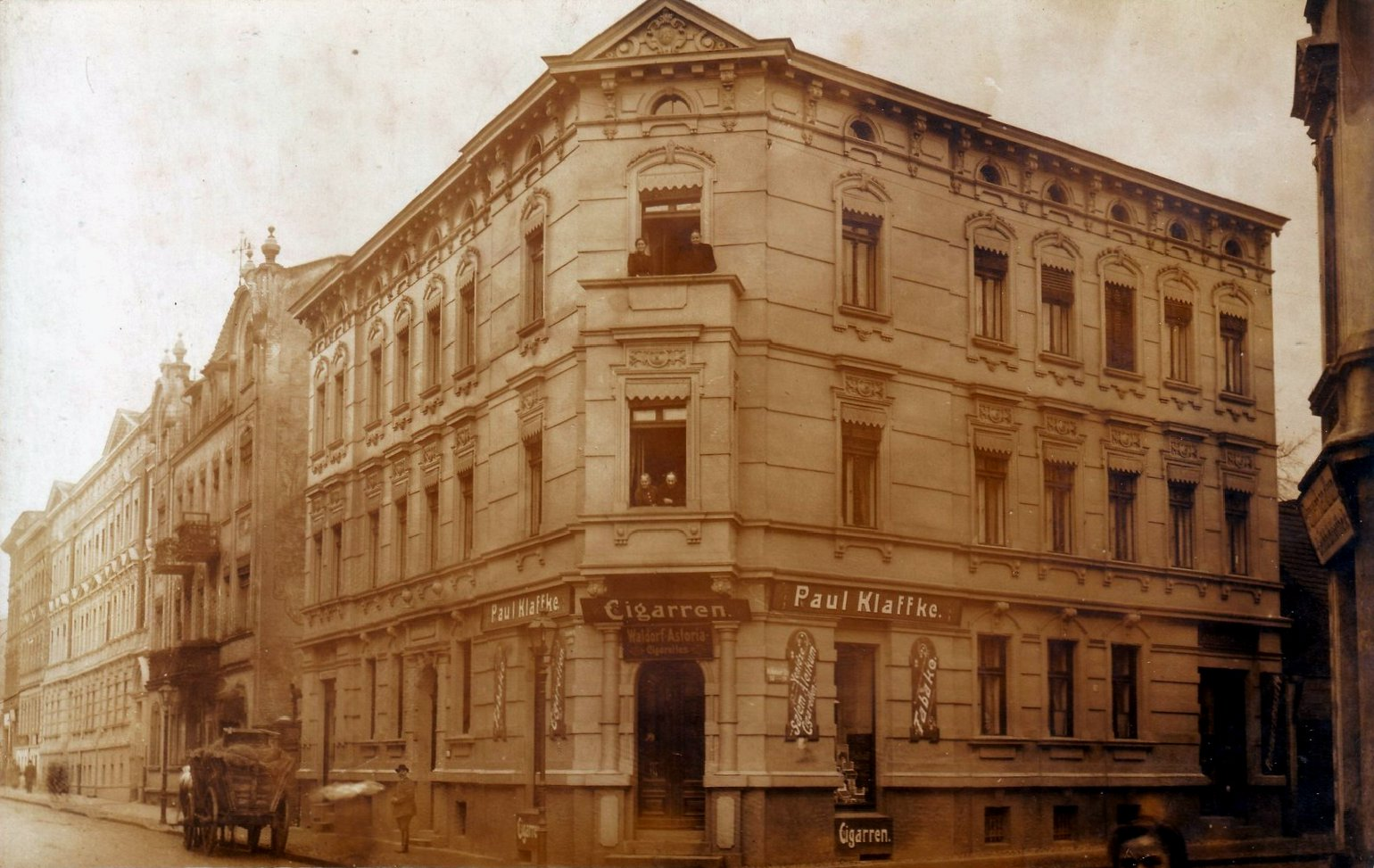
Tenement in 1910

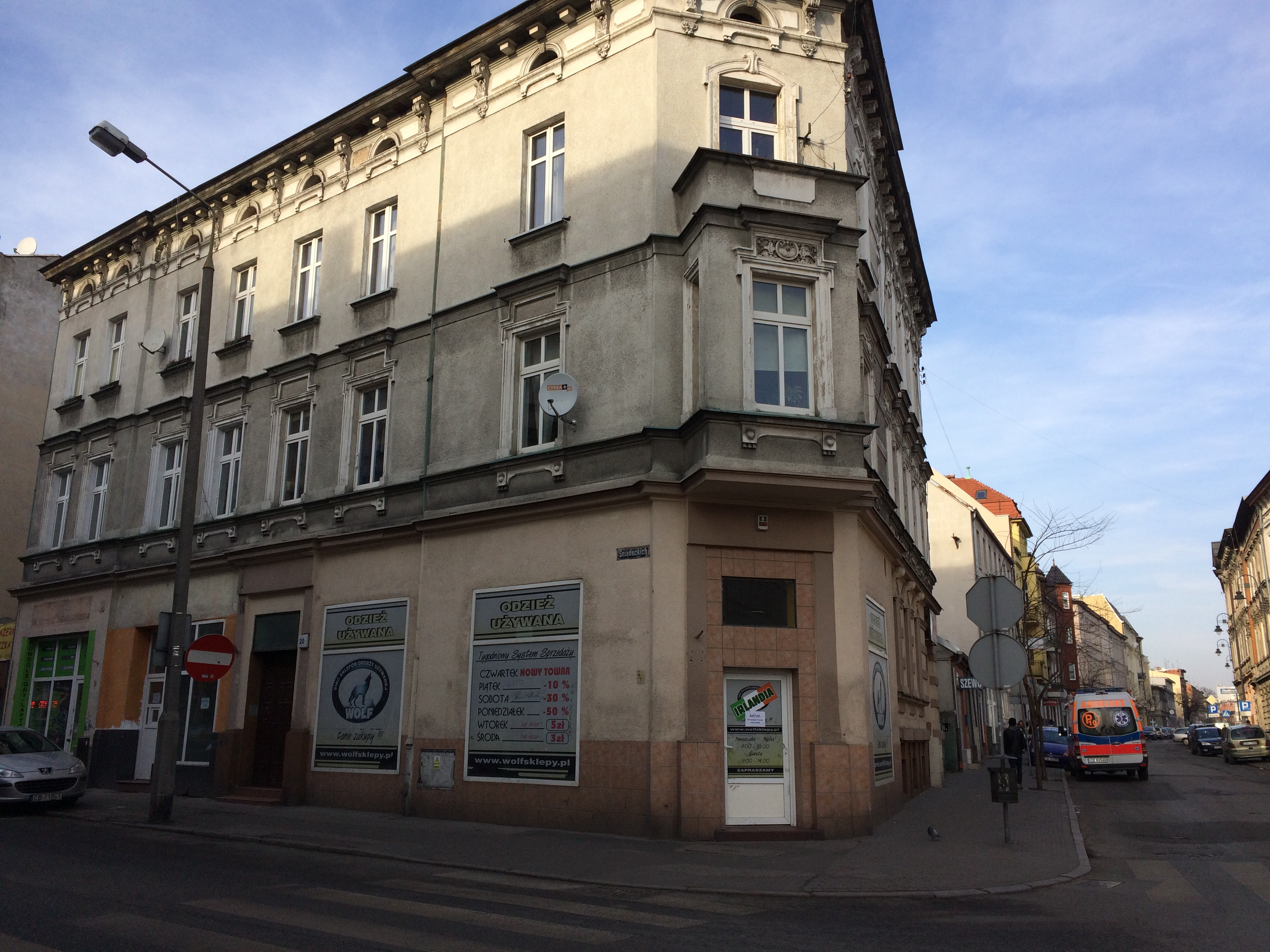
View from street intersection

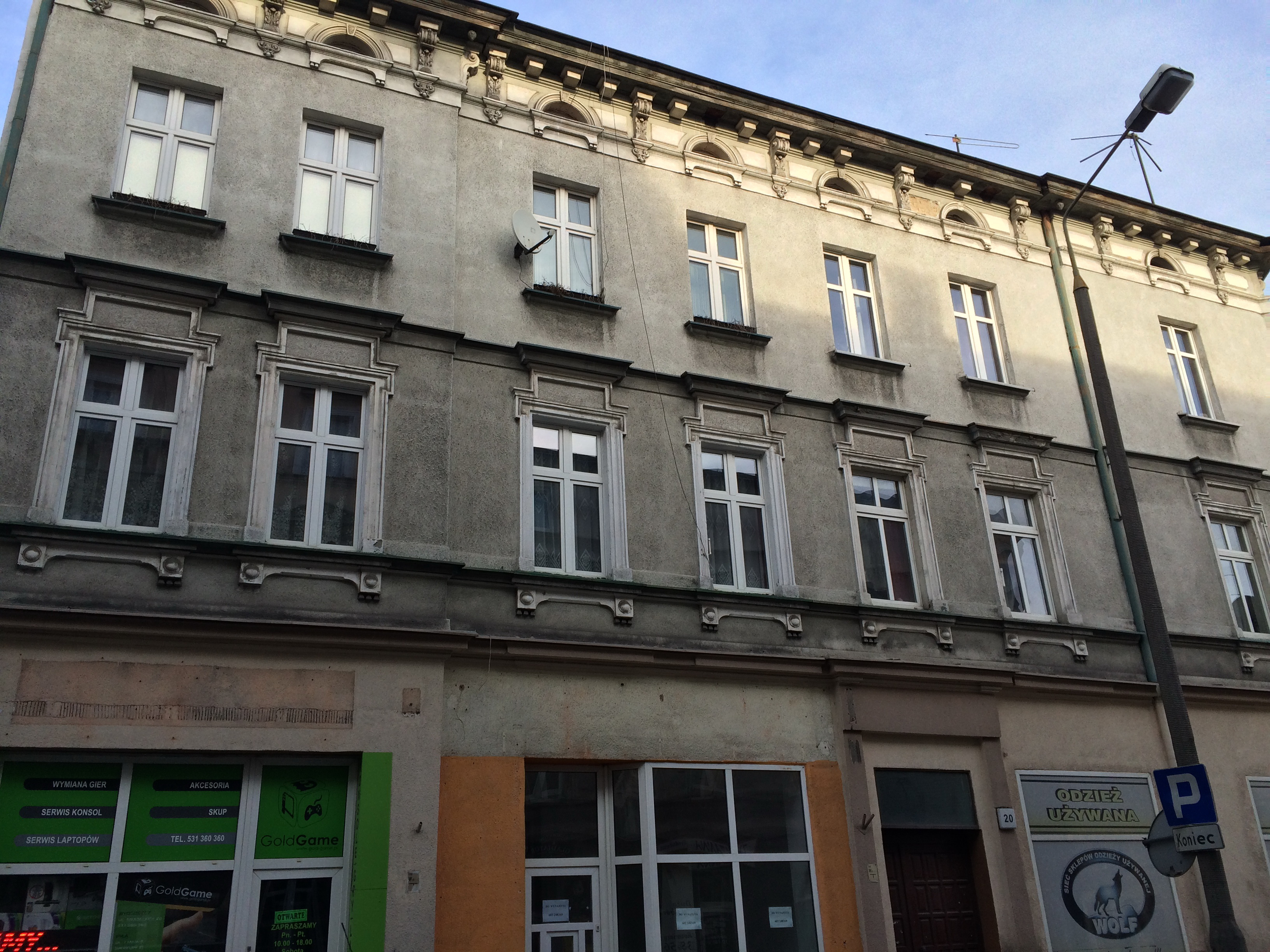
Elevation on Śniadecki Street

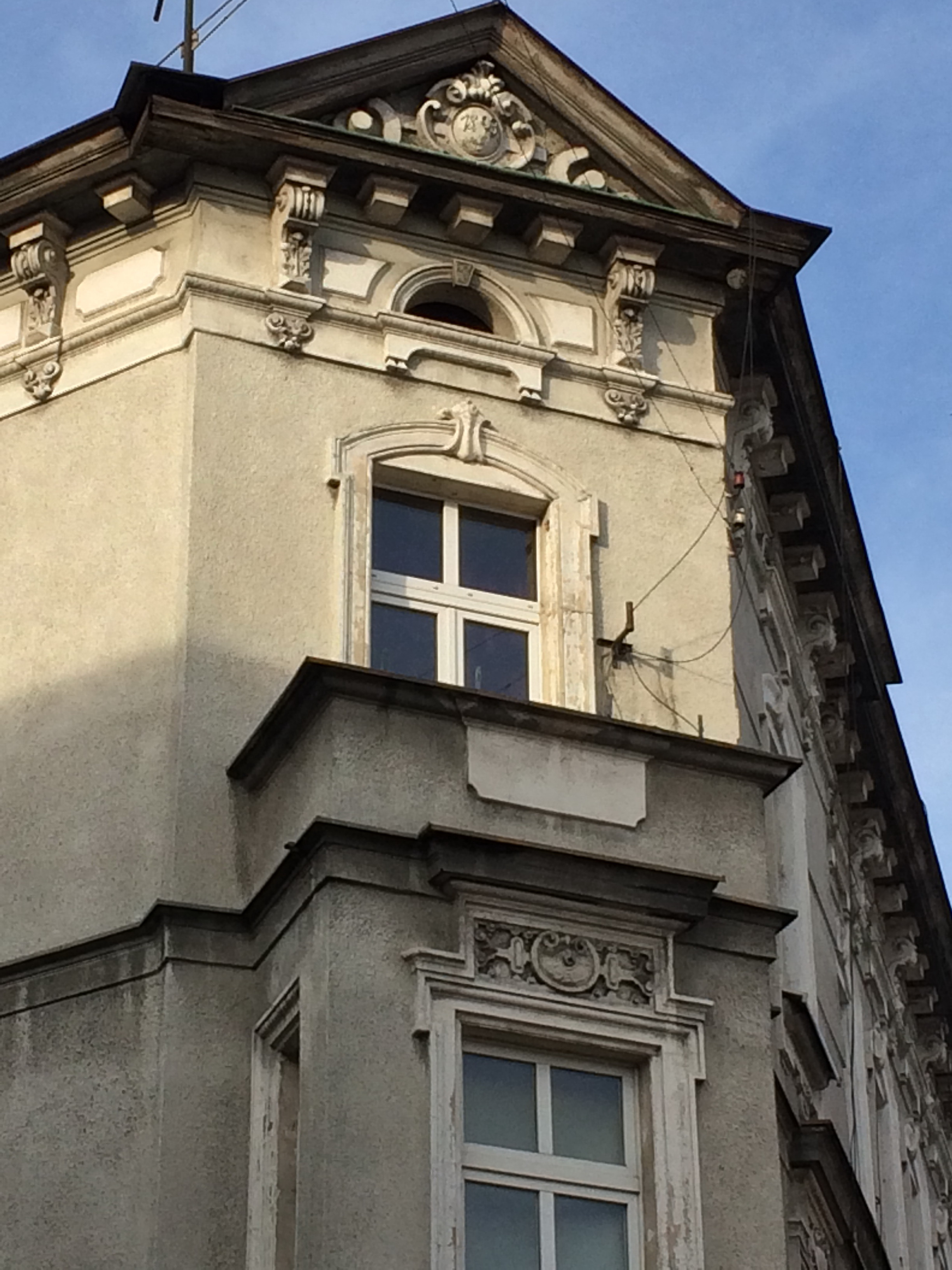
Detail of the corner bay window

=== Tenement at 22 ===
1902-1903

Eclecticism, forms of Art Nouveau

Gustav Stöckmann, a carpenter, owned this building which address was then Elisabethstraße 49.

The facade of this building is quite different from its neighbouring, due to its specific features: three wrought-iron balconies, two horseshoe arches gable balancing the facade ensemble and a large top-round stylized portal. Few ornaments enrich the elevation, except two cartouches below first floor windows, displaying rosettes and vegetal motifs. A refurbishing of the tenement had been performed in mid-2025.

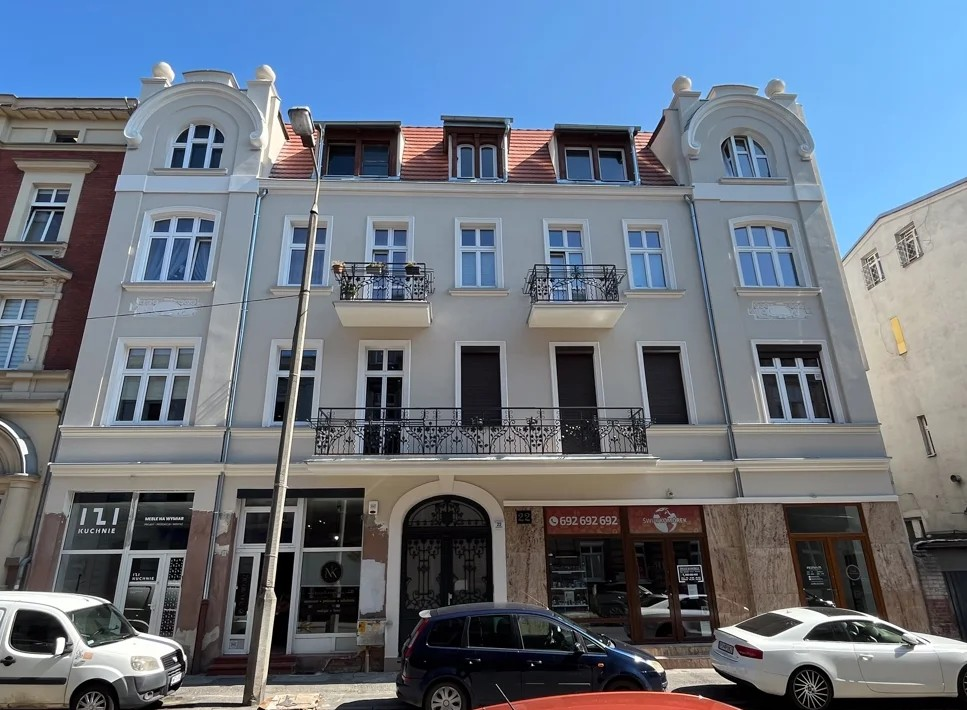
Main facade

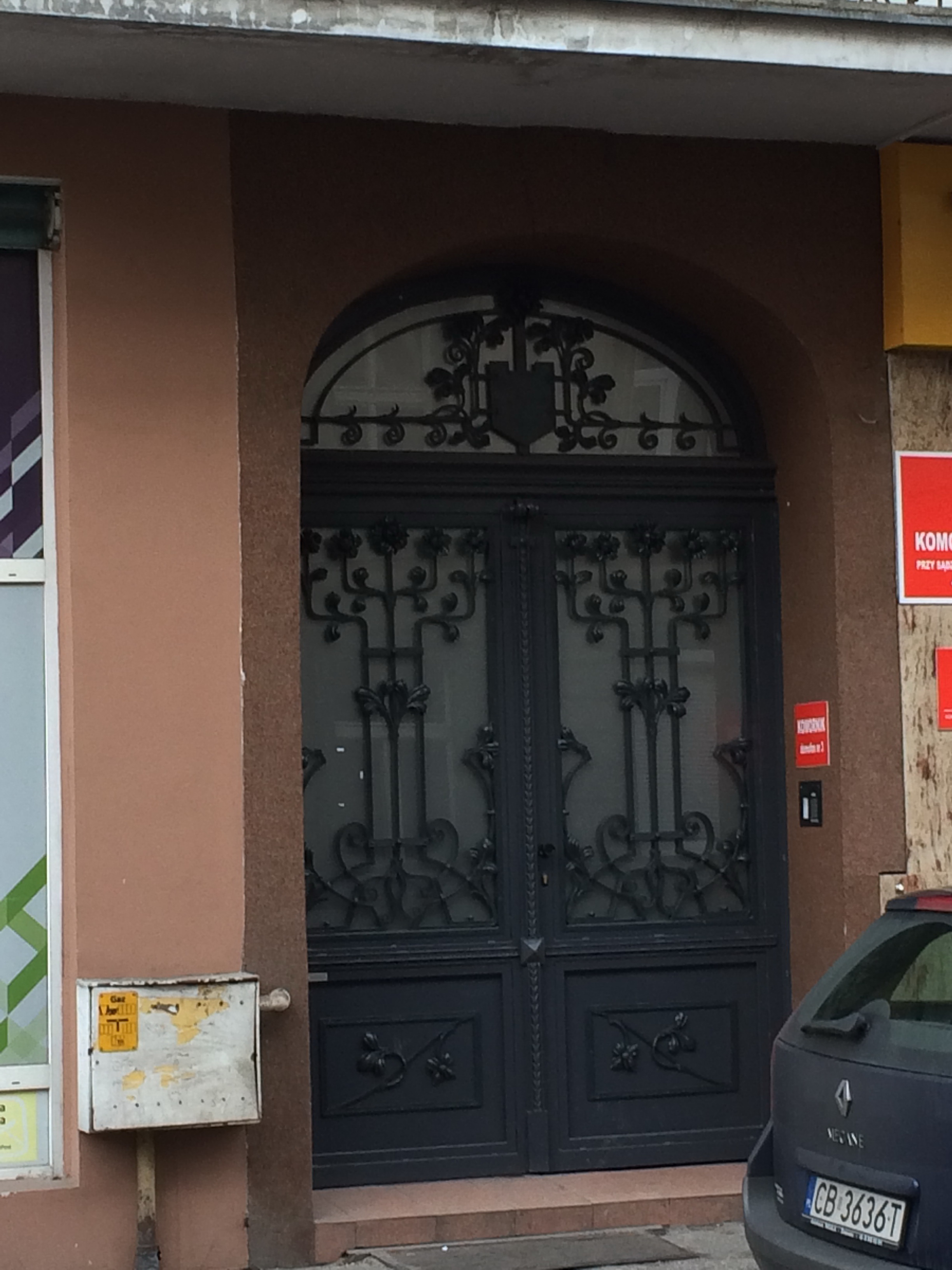
Wrought iron gate

=== Tenement at 23 ===
Modern architecture

Almost nothing remains from the original 19th-century building located at this place, Elisabethstraße 10. Apart from a tenement, there was from 1910 on a Protestant house of prayer, run by sextons (German: küster). After World War II, and till the mid-1970s, cinema Griffin (Polish: Gryf) filled the premises. After, it was a soldier's entertainment house before becoming the seat of a bank at the end of the 1970s.

=== Tenement at 24/26 ===
ca 1895

Eclecticism

First landlord of the current building was Mr Menßel, a rentier, then his widow who survived him.

The large brick facade on the street displays bossage around ground windows, pediment and adorned pilasters on the first floor. The ensemble is topped by two large tympanum wall gables. One can notice the grand portal with columns, stuccoed putti and floral motifs.

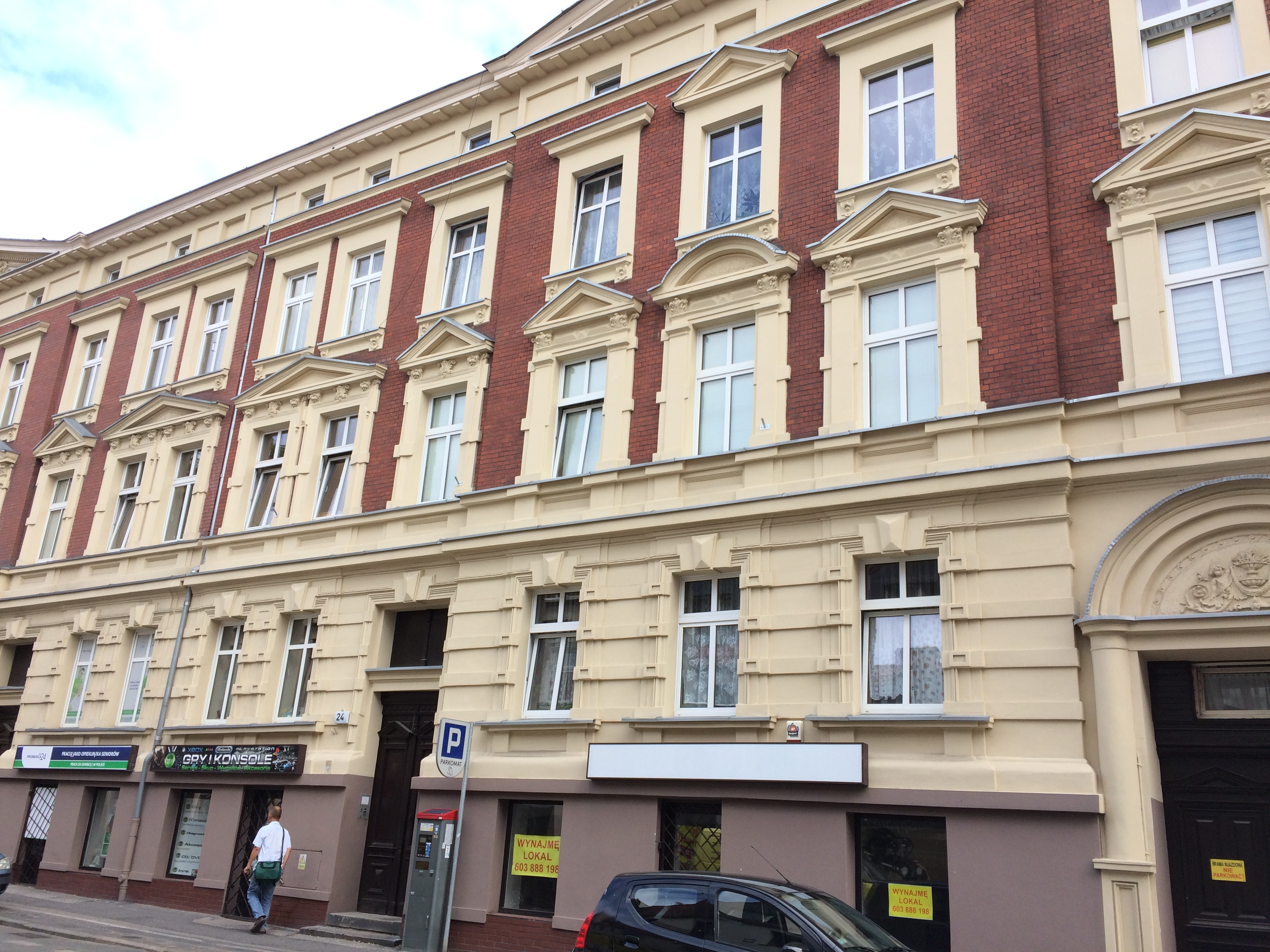
Main facade

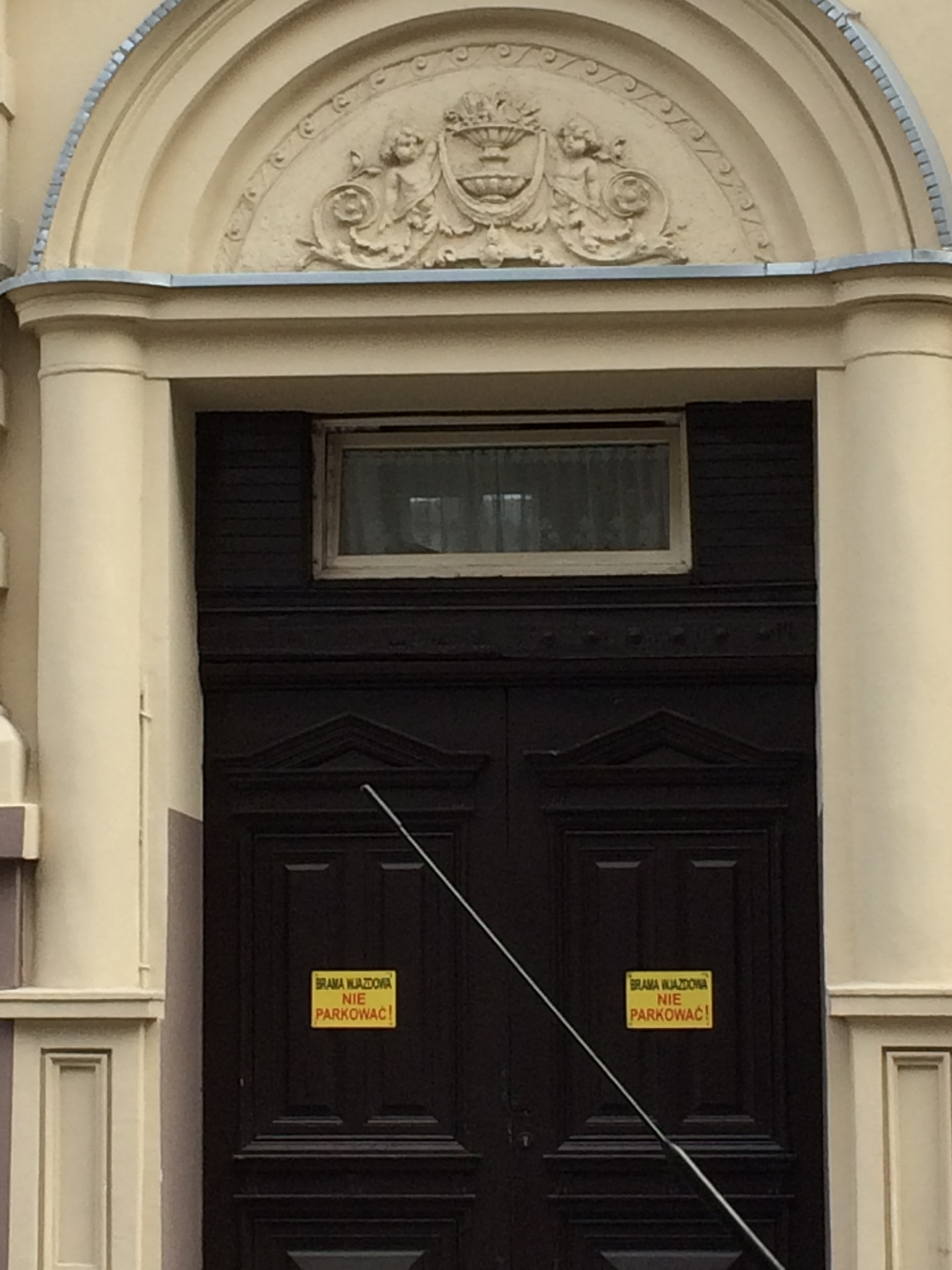
Entrance portal

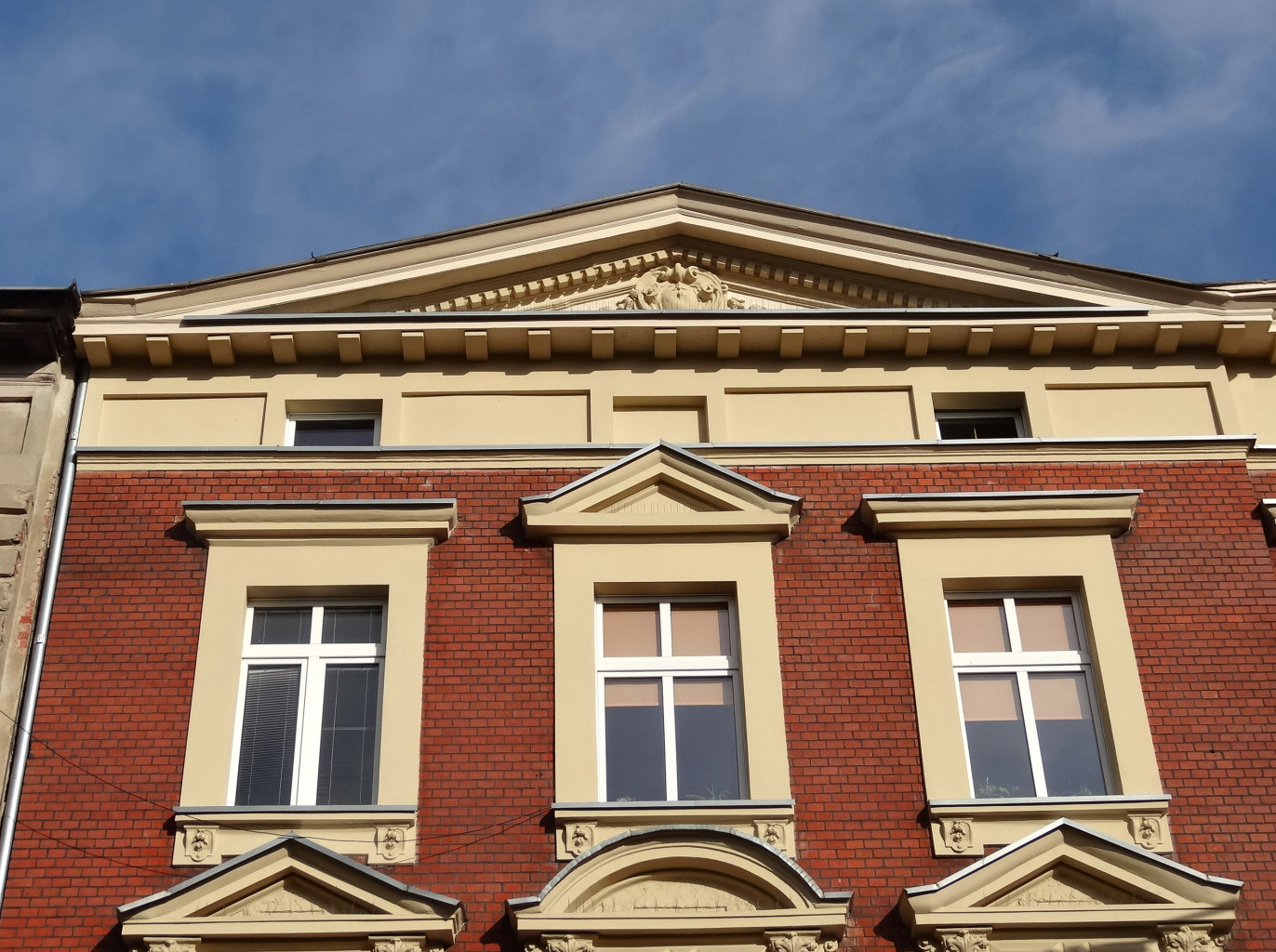
Pediment of the gable

=== Tenement at 25 ===
1911, by Georg Baesler

Eclecticism, early Art nouveau

At the time of its erection, building's address was Elisabethstraße 10. It is the birthplace of Janusz Filipiak, a Polish scientist, IT specialist, academic teacher, entrepreneur and sports activist.

The facade boasts elements of various architectural styles: bay windows, balconies, cartouches with ornaments, steep gables on both sides and dormers. Beside this tenement, the small single-storey house with a gable roof on the right dates back from the days when construction of the district started (1880s).

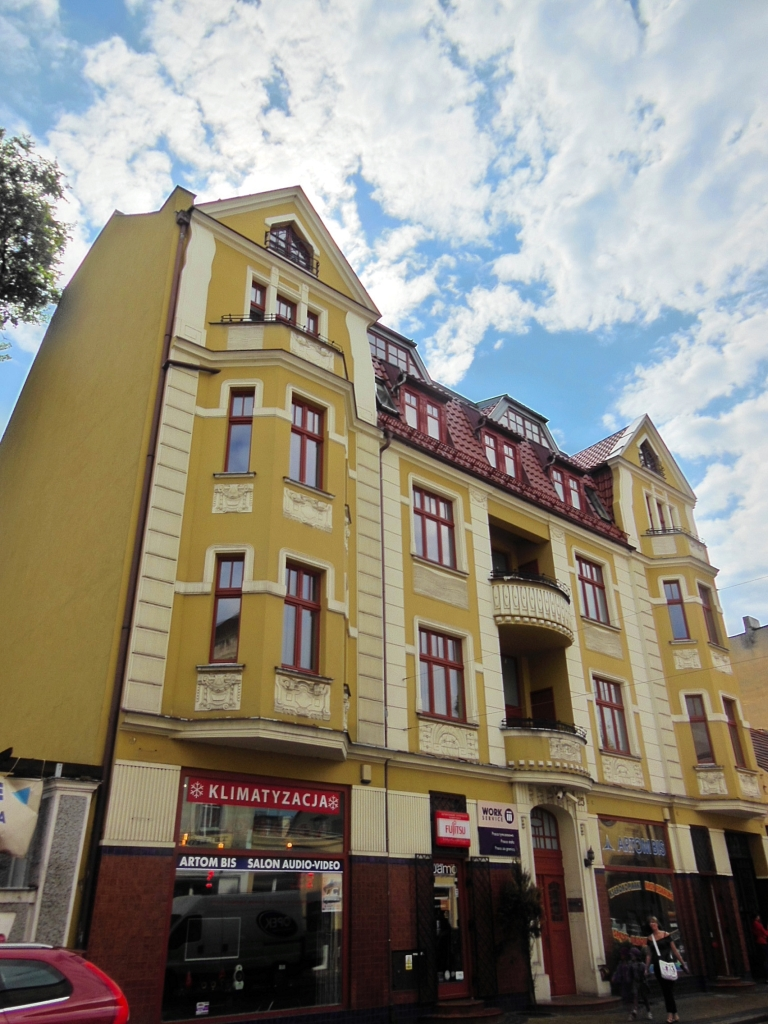
Main elevation

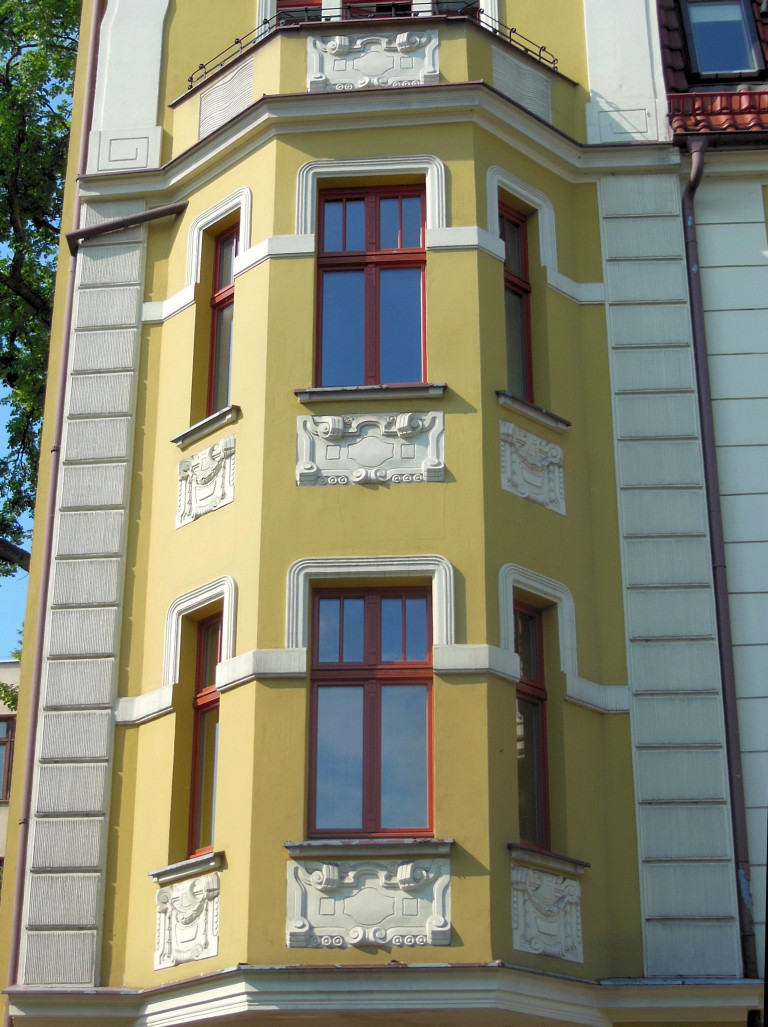
Cartouches on bay window and balcony

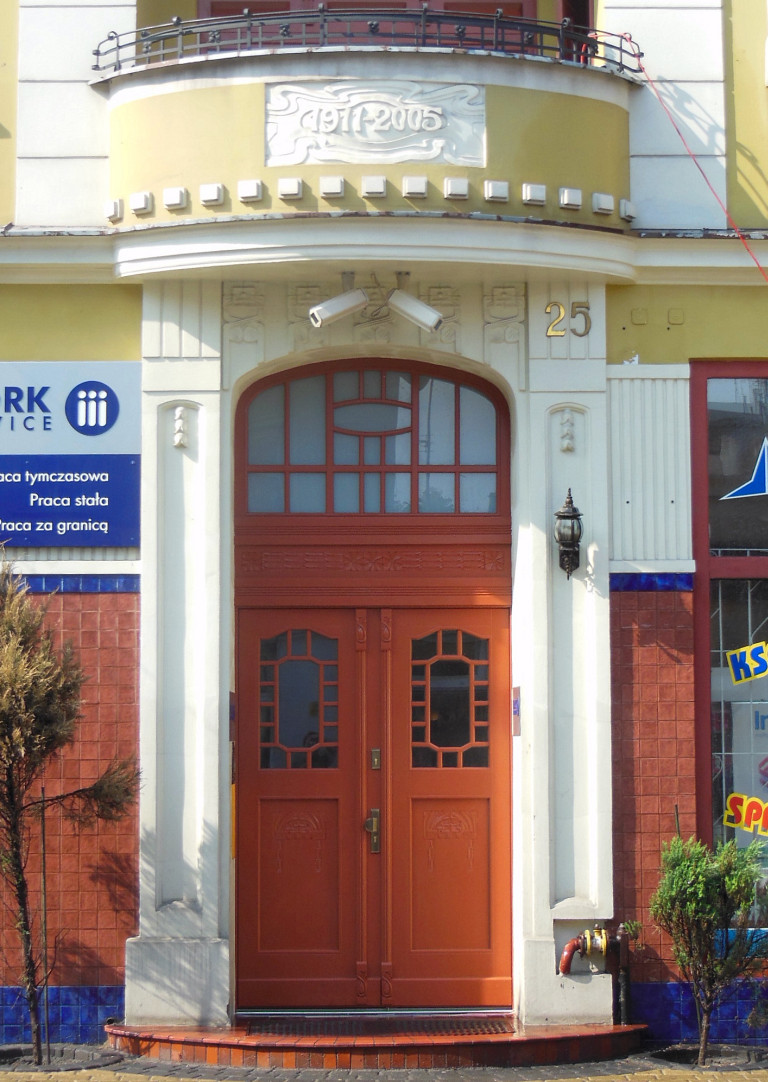
Portal

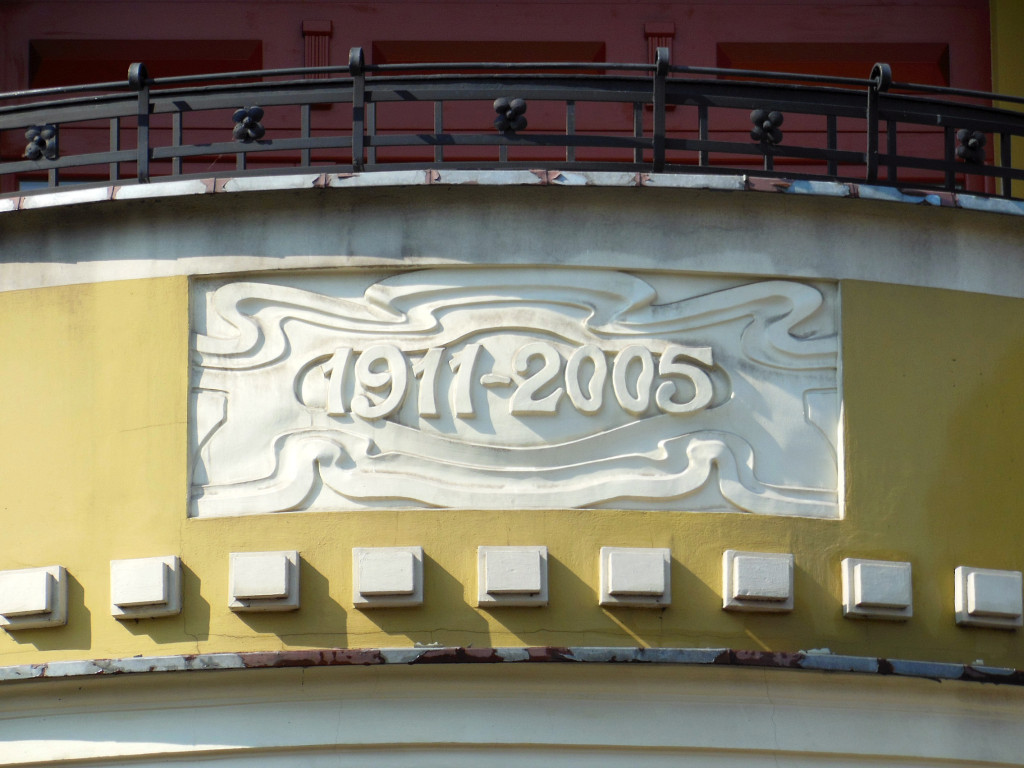
Detail of central cartouche

=== Carl Mauwe Tenement, at 29 ===
1902, by Fritz Weidner

Secession

The building at Elisabethstraße 13/14 was commissioned by Carl Mauwe, a photograph.

The elevation displays Art Nouveau characteristics cherished by Fritz Weidner: asymmetrical composition (bay window vs balconies or dissymmetrical wings), wavy lines, decorative motifs. Worth mentioning are the portal with stylized woman figure, floral decor, a putti scenery and the wattle and daub roof top crowned with a finial. A superb renovation had been performed in 2025.

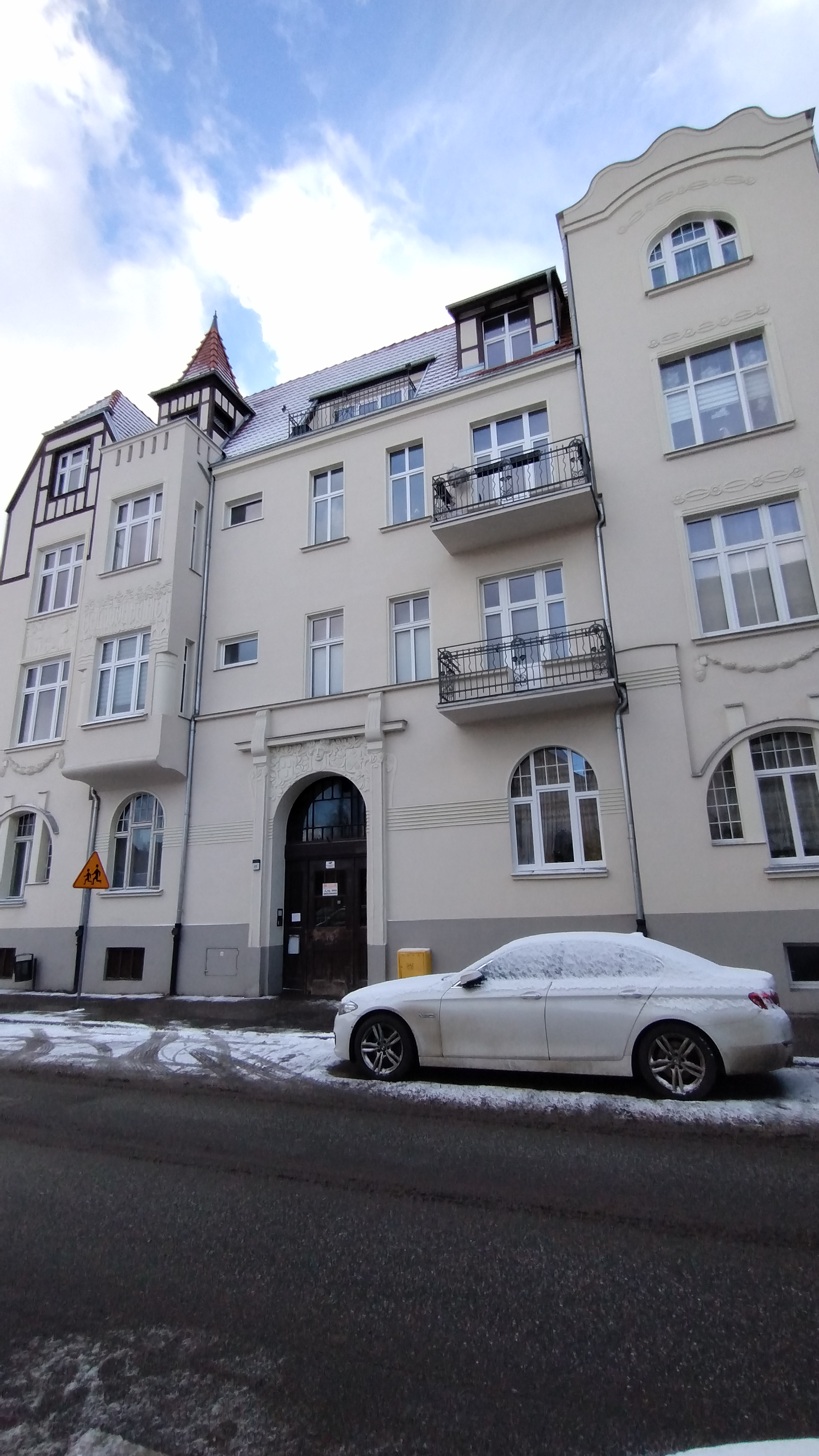
Renovated facade

=== William Wick Tenement, at 30 ===
1889–1890, by Józef Święcicki

Historicism- Forms of Northern Mannerism

William Wick, a railway official, ordered this building to Józef Święcicki in then Elisabethstraße 47a. In 1897, ground floor space has been re-arranged to house a commercial activity. In the courtyard of this building, Bruno Sommerfeld, an eminent piano-maker, opened in 1905 a locksmith's shop which soon started repairing keyboards (German: Reparaturwerkstatt). In 1910 he opened at 2 Śniadecki Street his first show-room, and, with his growing success, he opened other locations in Bydgoszcz (92 Jagiellońska st. as main factory and Willi Jahne's shop at 42 Gdańska street), as well as branch offices in Warsaw, Poznań, Katowice, Łódź and Gdańsk.

Facade architecture is noticeable by its bossages, balusters on first level windows, which are topped by heavy corbels crowned by triangular pediments. The second floor is more simple, with decorative motifs on top of overtures, whereas third level displays ornaments. All windows are flanked with rectangular pilasters.

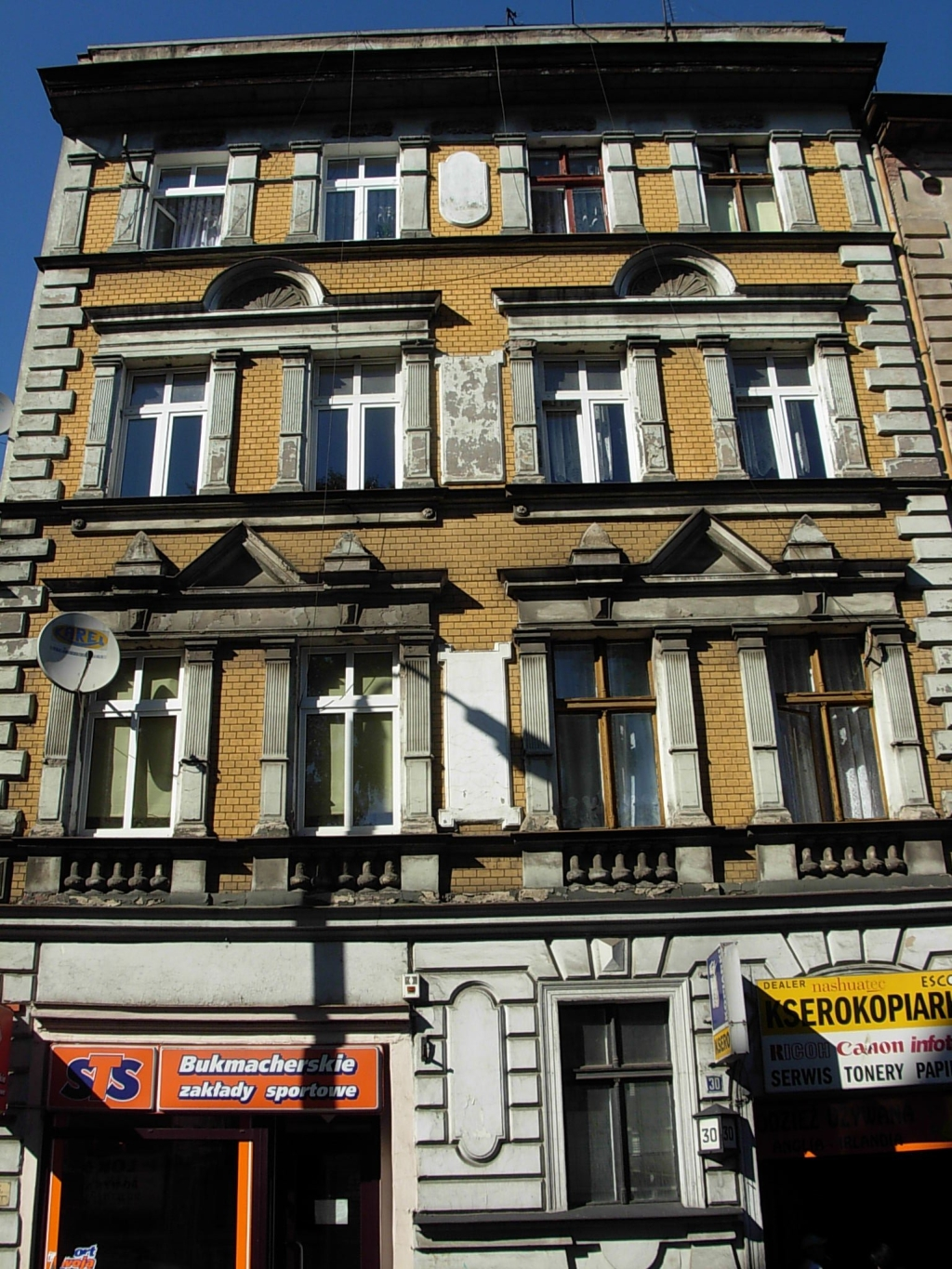
Main frontage

=== Tenement at 31 ===
1875–1900, by Anton Hoffmann

Neo-Renaissance

The building at Elisabethstraße 15/16 was owned by Carl Buhrand, a merchant. Its designer Anton Hoffmann was the stepfather of Bydgoszcz architect Józef Święcicki.

The elevation is parted in two different height facade by the section standing above the passageway, which is adorned by long pilasters, flanking a window on each level. These openings are ornamented as well by pilasters and pediments. A corbel table crowns the top.

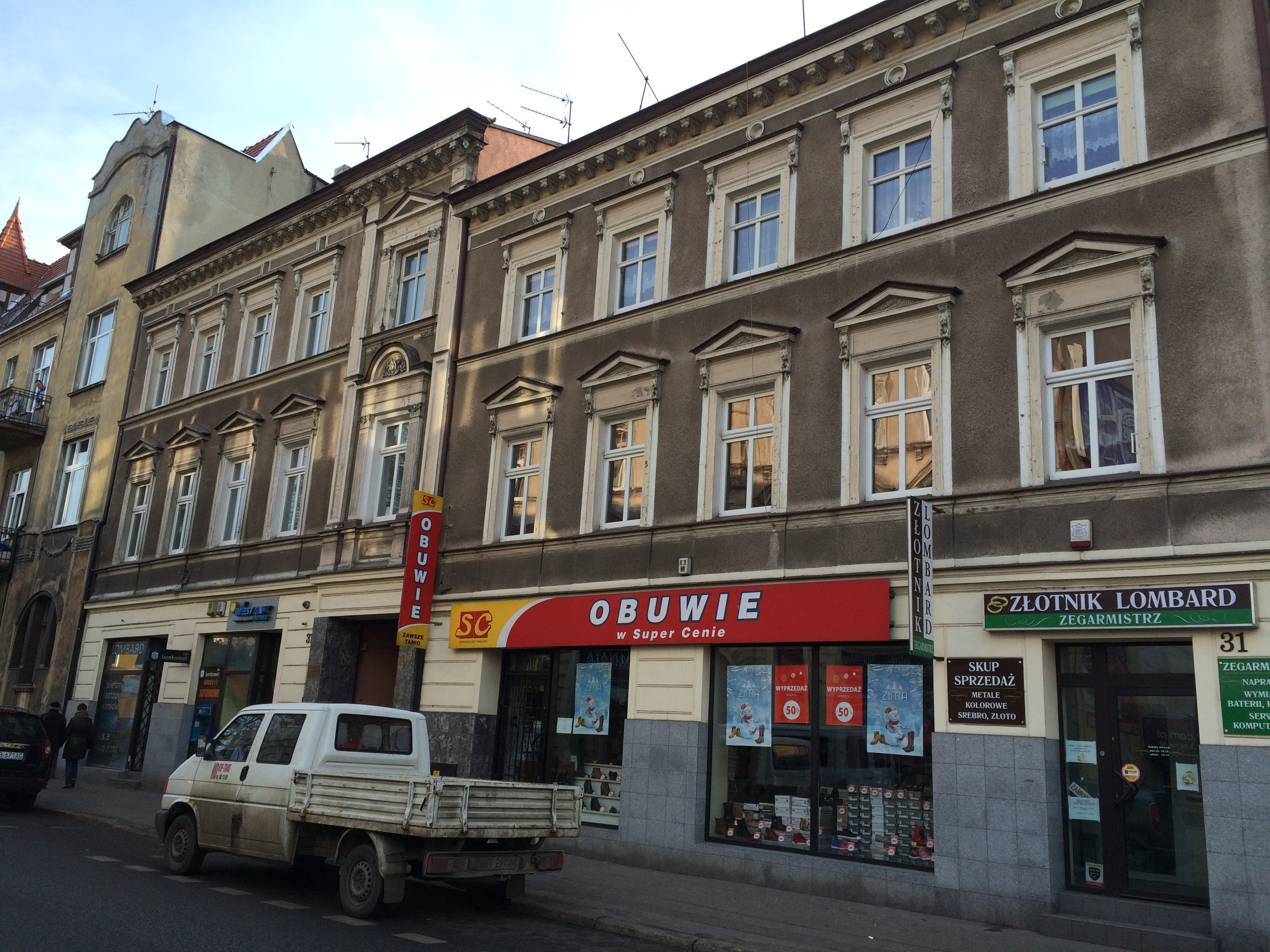
Main elevation

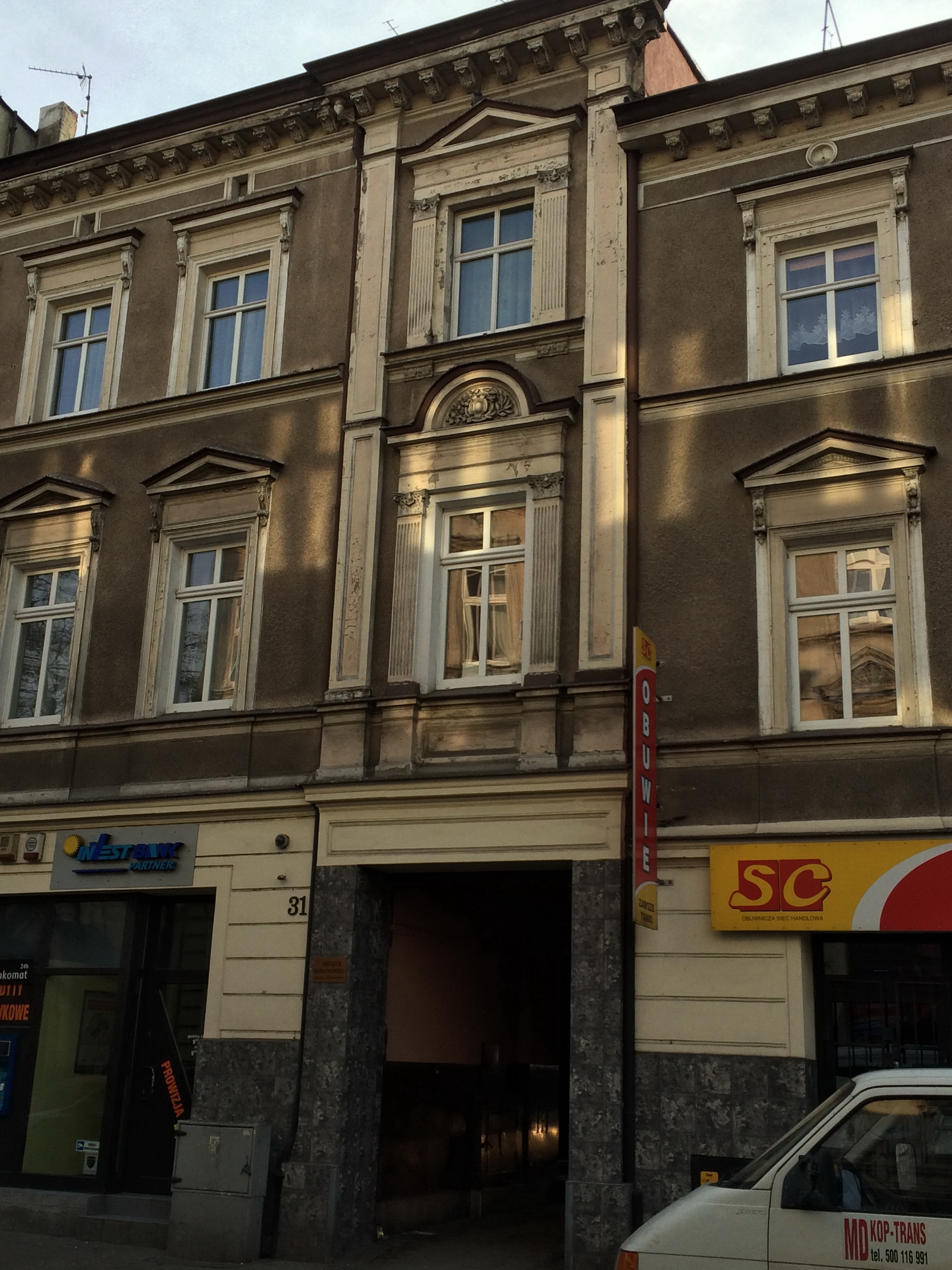
Detailed view

=== Tenement at 35, corner with Sienkiewicza street ===
1894

Eclecticism

First landlord of the building at then Elisabethstraße 18 was Gustav Schmidt, a restaurateur, who lived there until the beginning of World War I.

The tenement is particularly noticeable by its grand bay window overhanging the corner: first floor is adorned with columns, rosettes on the lintel and a triangular pediment, second displays pilasters crowned by a tented roof. The facade on Śniadecki Street is ornamented likewise, in addition to two large wrought iron balconies.

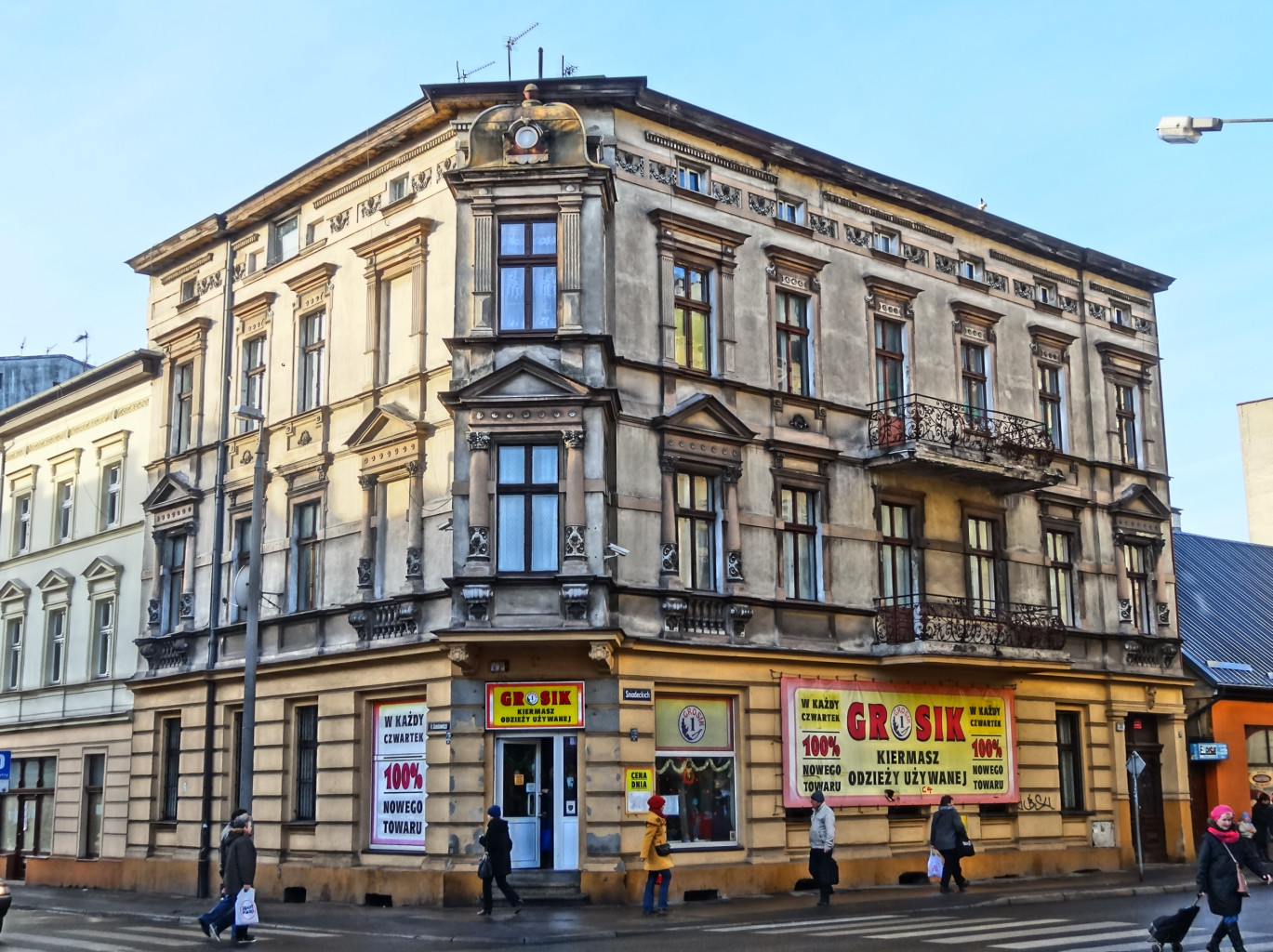
Corner view

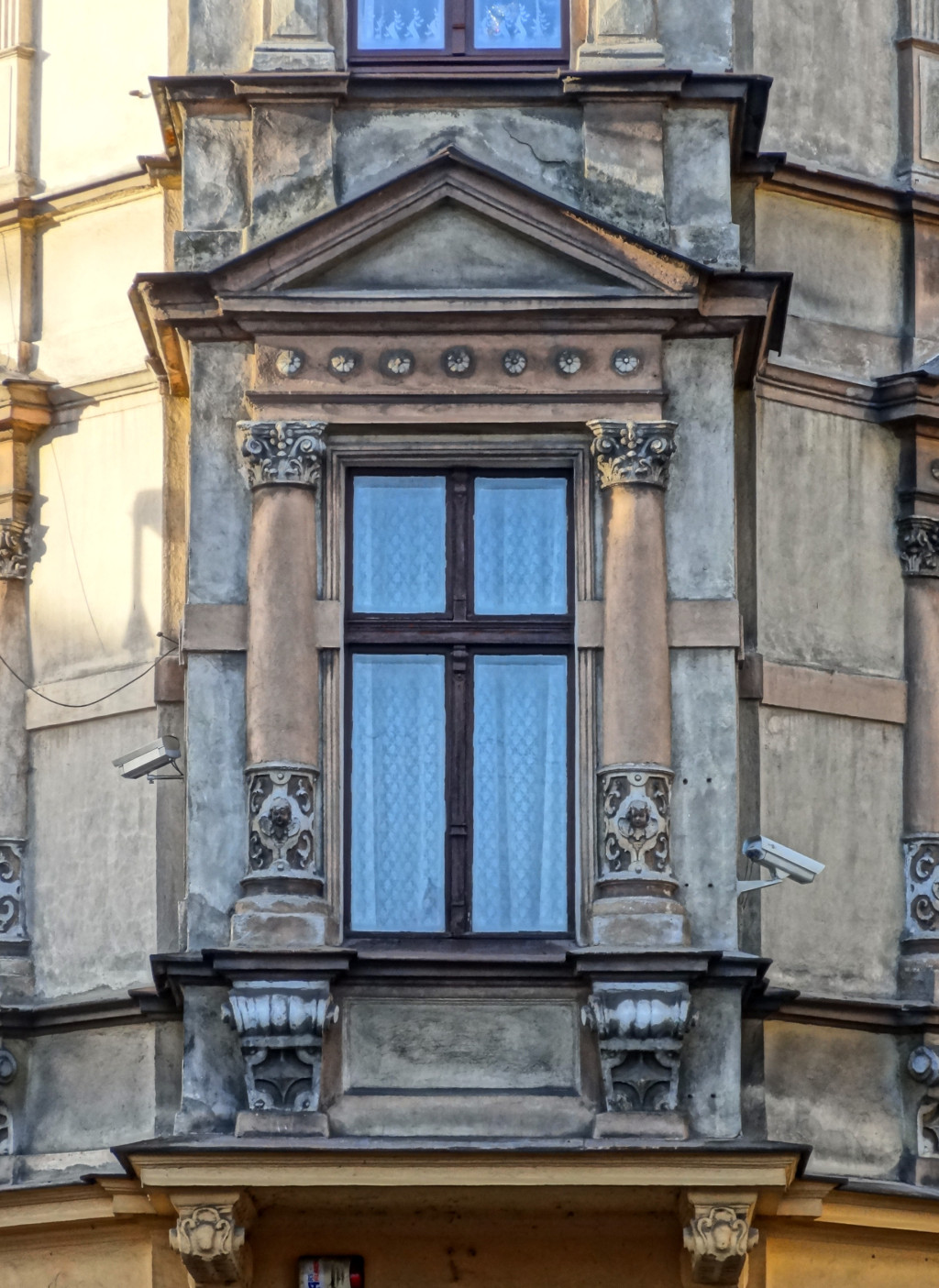
Bay window first floor window

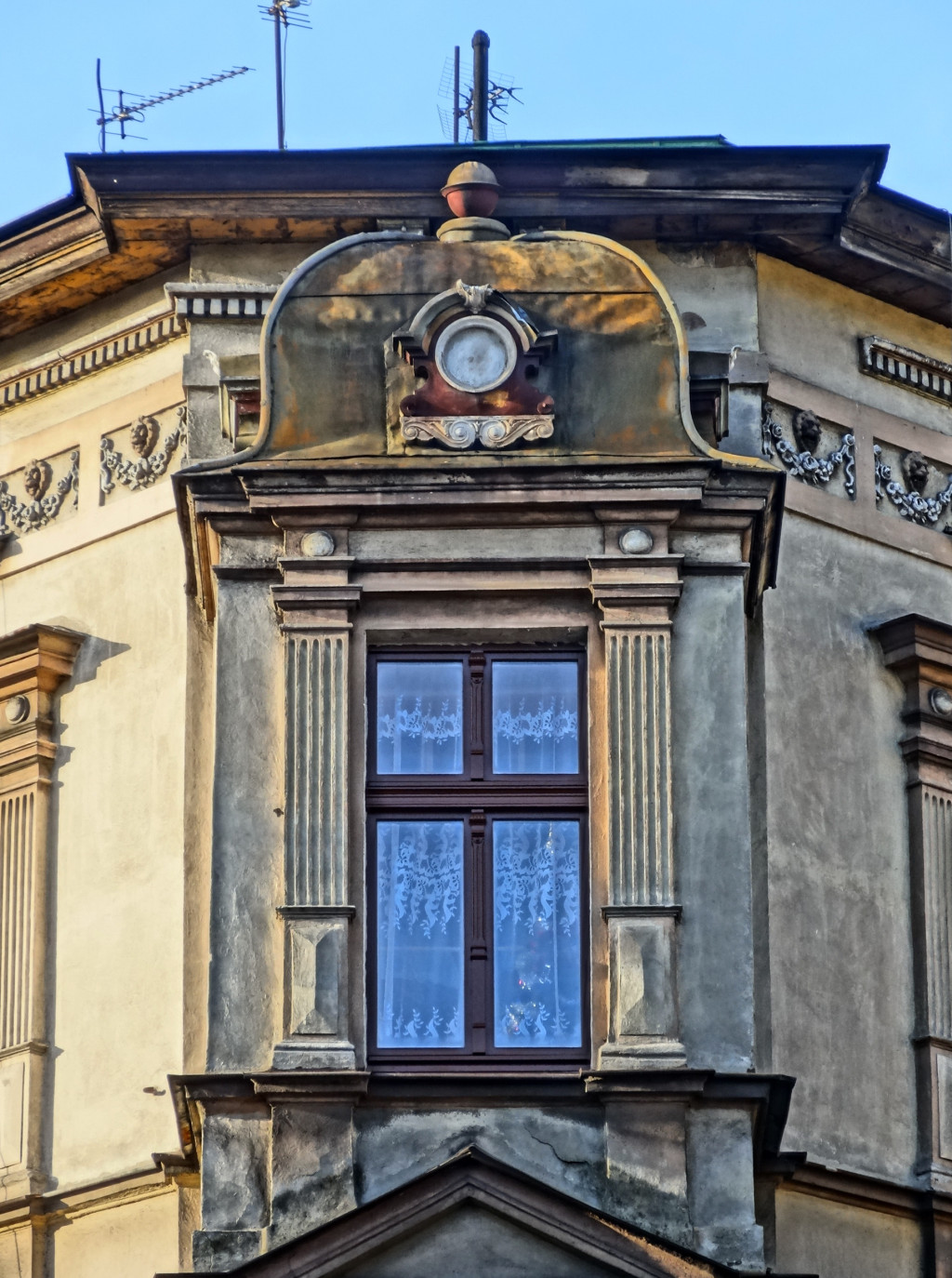
Bay window second floor window

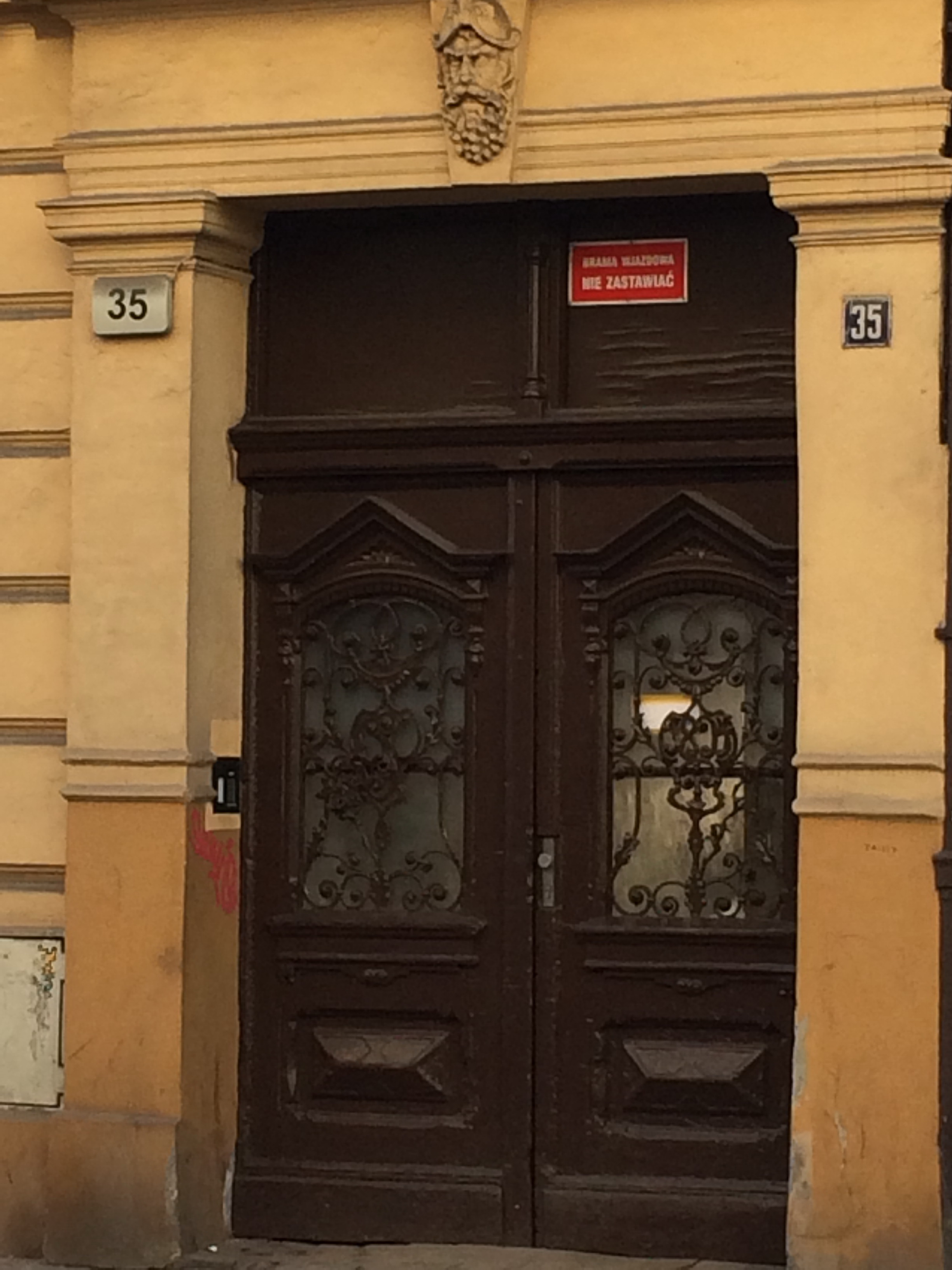
Gate on Śniadecki Street

=== Old Catholic Church of the Resurrection, at 36 ===
1864–1892, by Józef Święcicki

Historicism- Forms of Neo-Gothic

The Old Catholic Church of the Resurrection is a temple following Old Catholic Church beliefs, gathering approximately 300 families. The church was built in 1864 as a house of prayer for Catholic Apostolic Church (Irvingites): it was the first religious building constructed in what is now downtown. The designer of the building is not known. In 1892 the church was expanded with side chapels. Until 1945 it served the Catholic Apostolic Church (Irvingianer) German-speaking religious community. In 1946 the municipal authorities allocated the temple to the Old Catholic Church in Poland (Polish: Kościół Polskokatolicki w Rzeczypospolitej Polskiej), parish in Bydgoszcz which existed since 1925, but had no official location. In the 1950s, a modernization work has been carried out, especially to the external facade of the church, between 1978 and 1979 a renovation of interiors happened. In 1982, a new rectory has been built beside the church.

The church is oriented to the north, presenting its main elevation to Śniadeckich street. Next to typical Gothic forms are also Italian architectural features: rosette windows, friezes running under cornices and a gable facade. The external decoration is balanced and unsophisticated. Interiors comprise a matroneum and a wooden ceiling. Medieval style of the temple boasts buttresses, pointed windows, an entrance portal, pinnacles and cross-ribbed vaults chancel. Noteworthy are the Tudor-type arches of the nave.

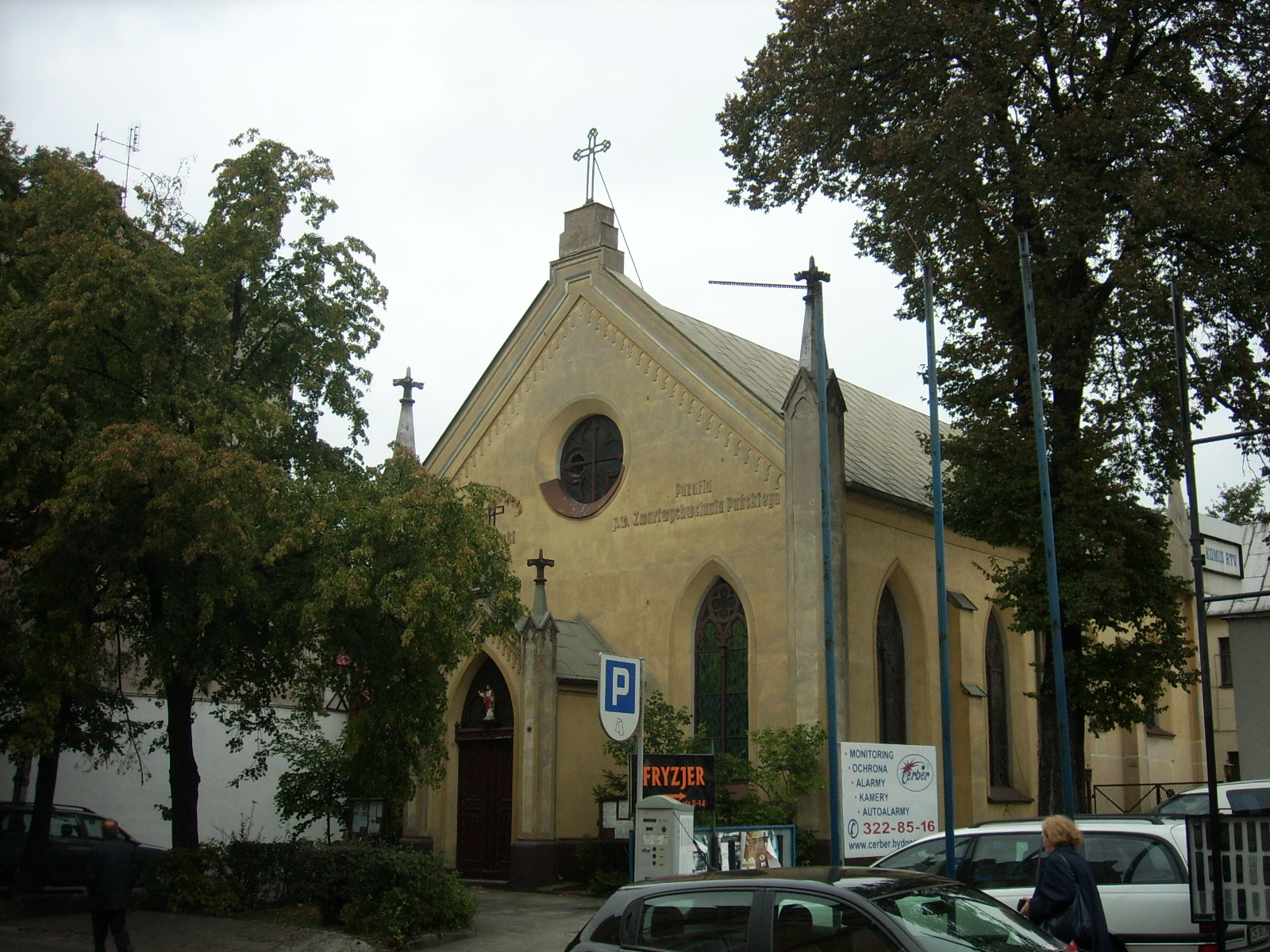
View from Śniadeckich street

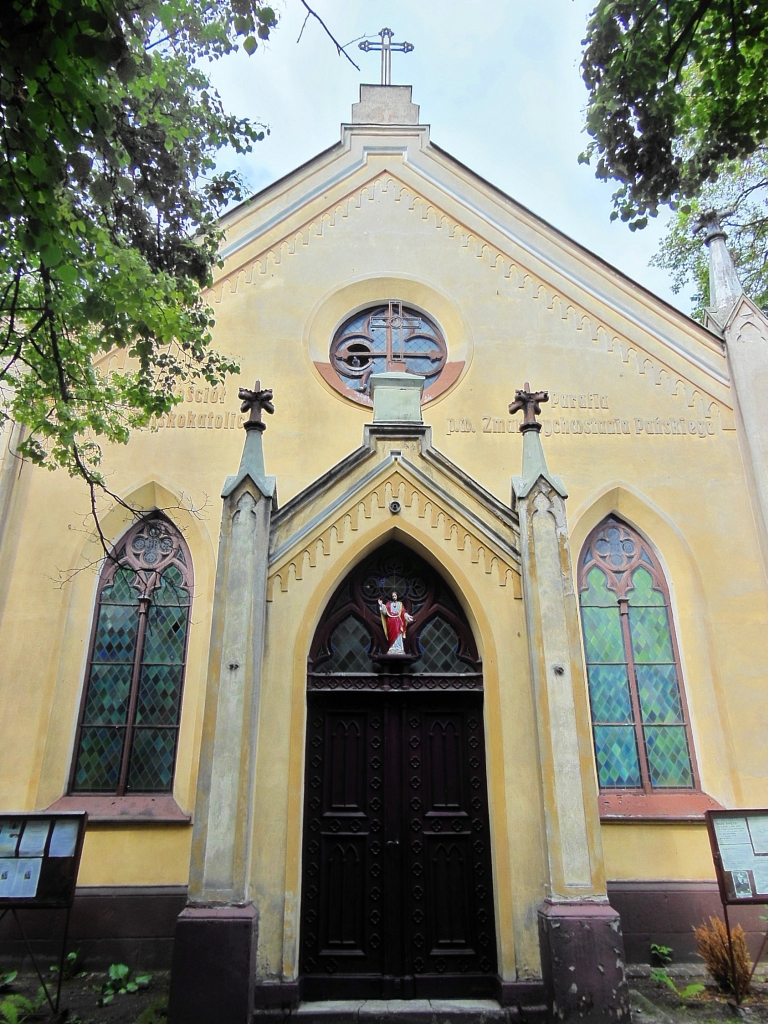
Portal

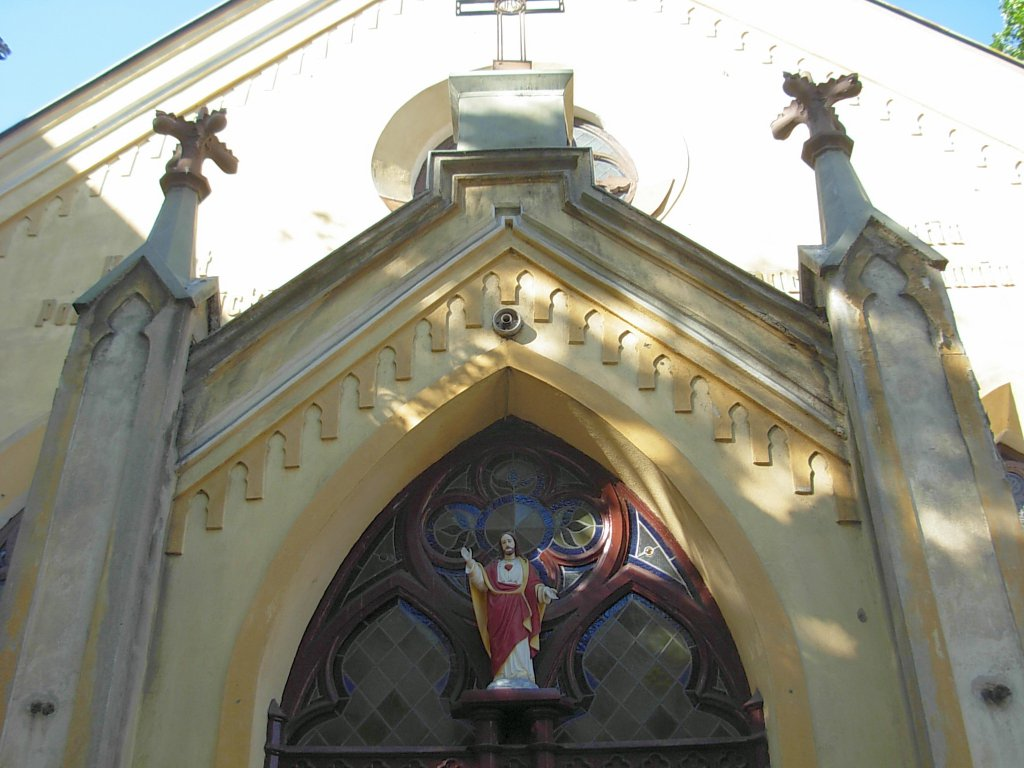
Architectural detail of the portal decoration

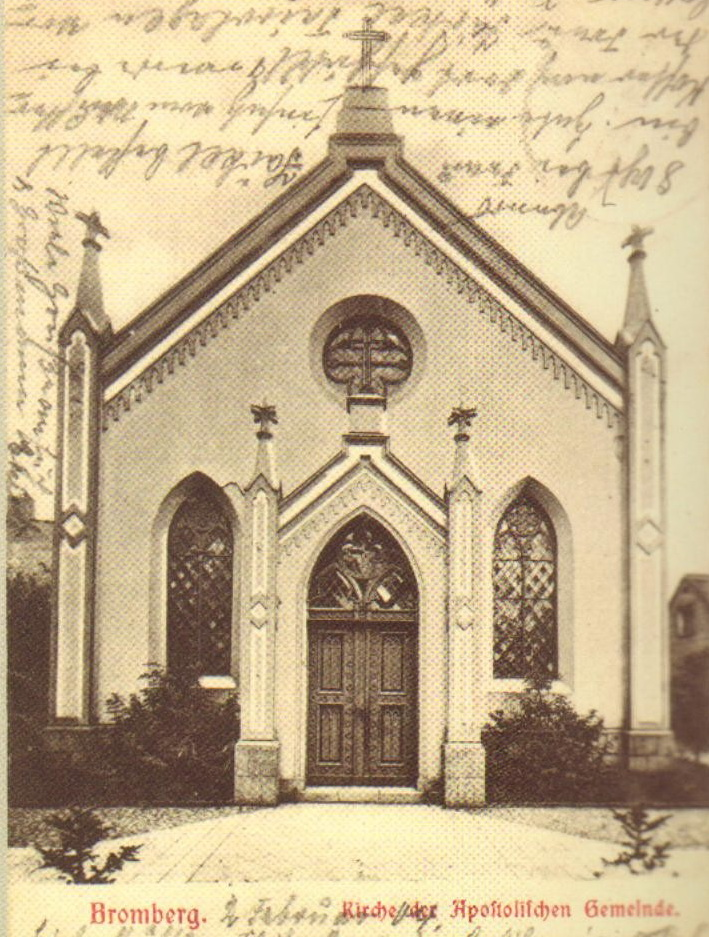
Front elevation in 1905

=== Albert Voigt tenement, at 38 ===
1893, by Józef Święcicki

Historicism- Forms of Northern Mannerism

Albert Voigt, a railway clerk, ordered this building to Józef Święcicki in then Elisabethstraße 43a. During World War II, this house has been used by Kazimierz Leski and Jan Szczurek-Cergowski to command the western area of Polish Home Army (Polish: Armia Krajowa). A memorial plaque has been placed on the facade in 1992.

The elevation is remarkable with its bossages, balusters on first level windows, which are topped by heavy corbels crowned with triangular and arched pediments. The second floor is more simple, with decorative motifs and corbels on top of windows. A slight avant-corps underlines the gate and windows topping it.

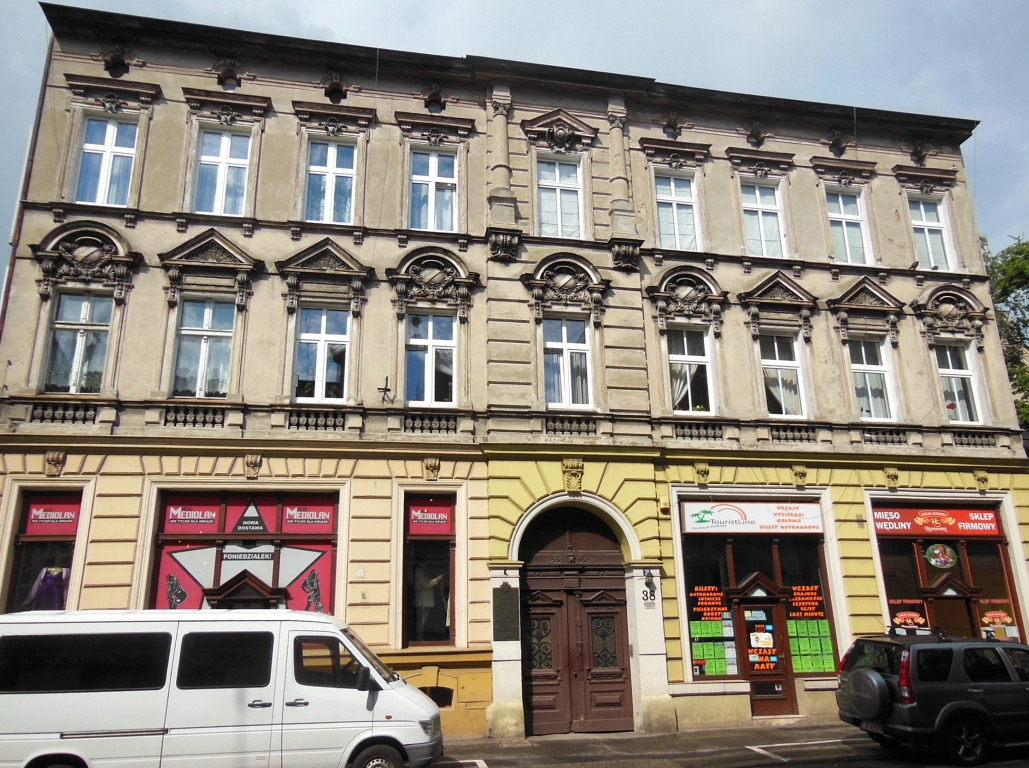
Main frontage

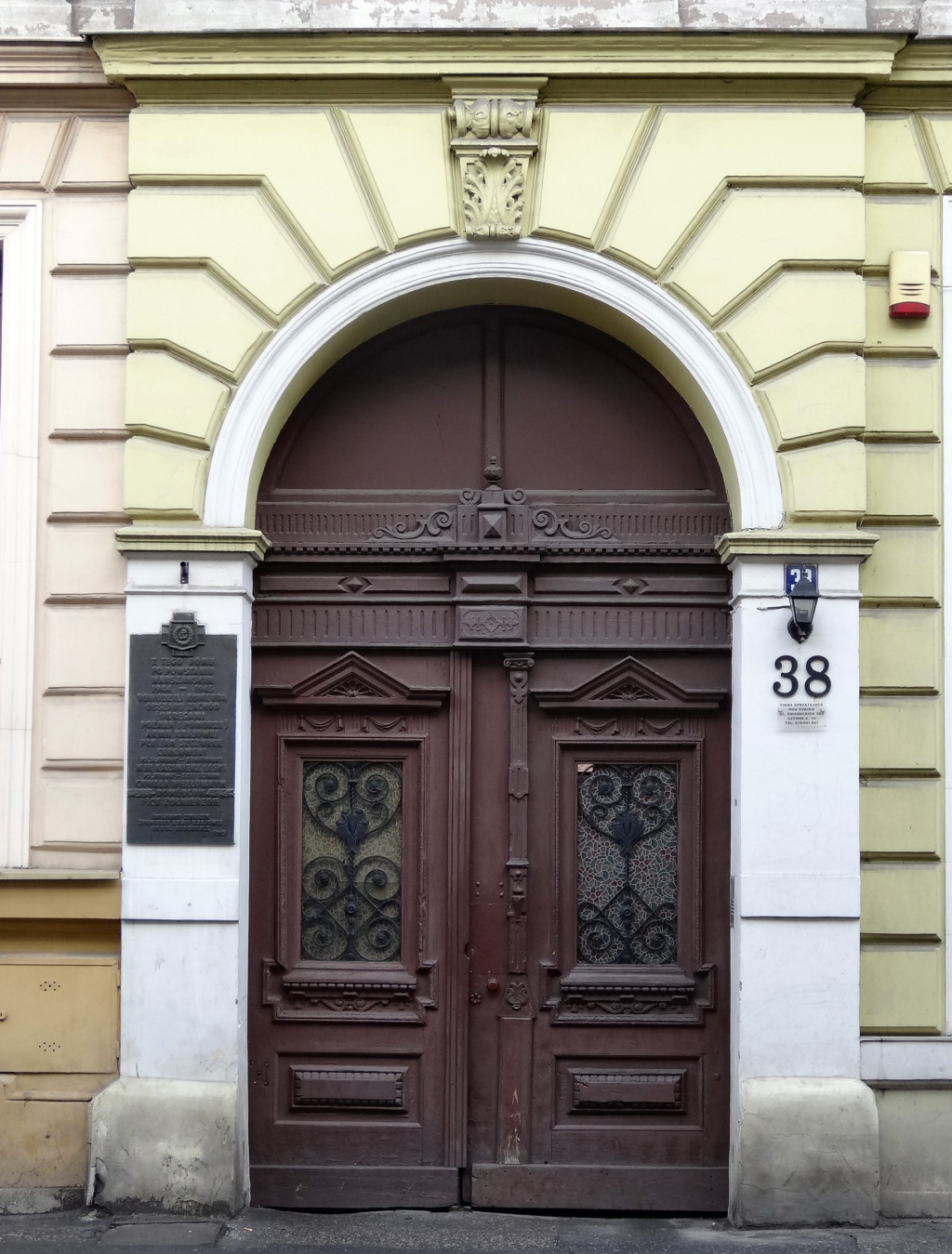
Entrance Portal

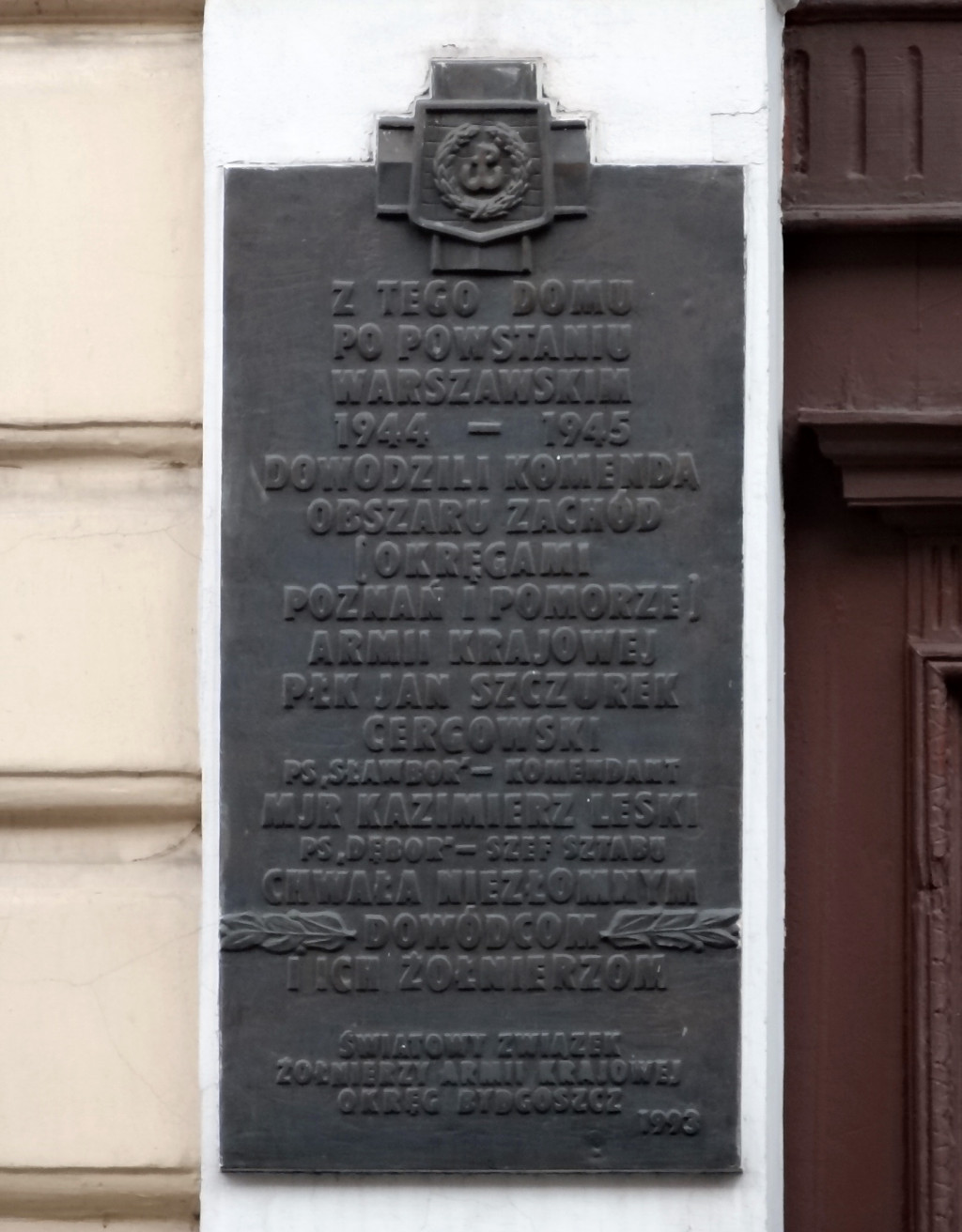
Commemorative plaque

=== Tenements at 39 and 41 ===
1877-78

Neo-Renaissance

Buildings at Elisabethstraße 20/21 are reported as being held by "M.ß. Engelhard, Zimmermeister" (room manager). From the 1890s to the outbreak of World War I, a series of rentiers owned these buildings. In 1946–1947, Hasan Konopacki and his family shortly lived there following their transfer from Vilnius.

Although having been constructed according to the same patterns, elevations evolved differently through the years. Nr.39 still displays its original architectural motifs, in particular the adorned gate, the grand bay window and ornamented cartouches. Nr.41 facade suffered more, losing its details, but keeping the bay window: a recent refurbishment underlines the quality of the architectural features.

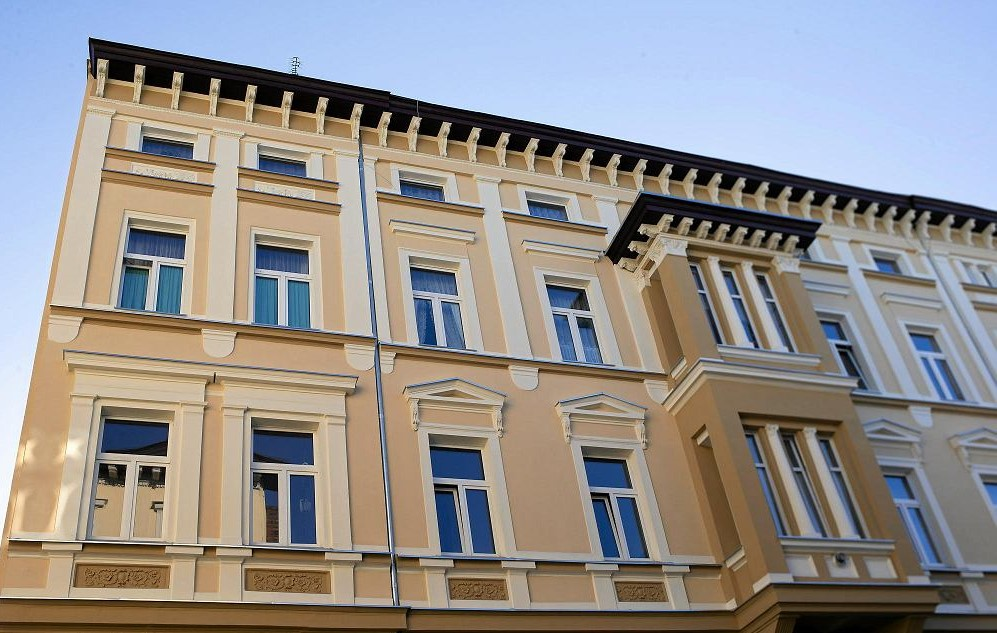
Main elevation at 39

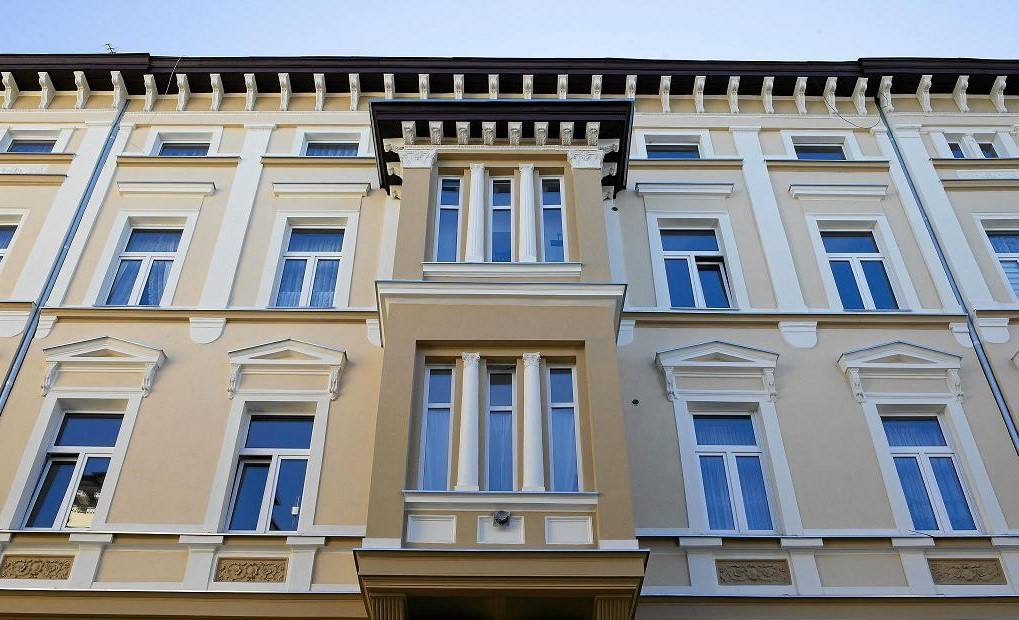
Bay window at 39

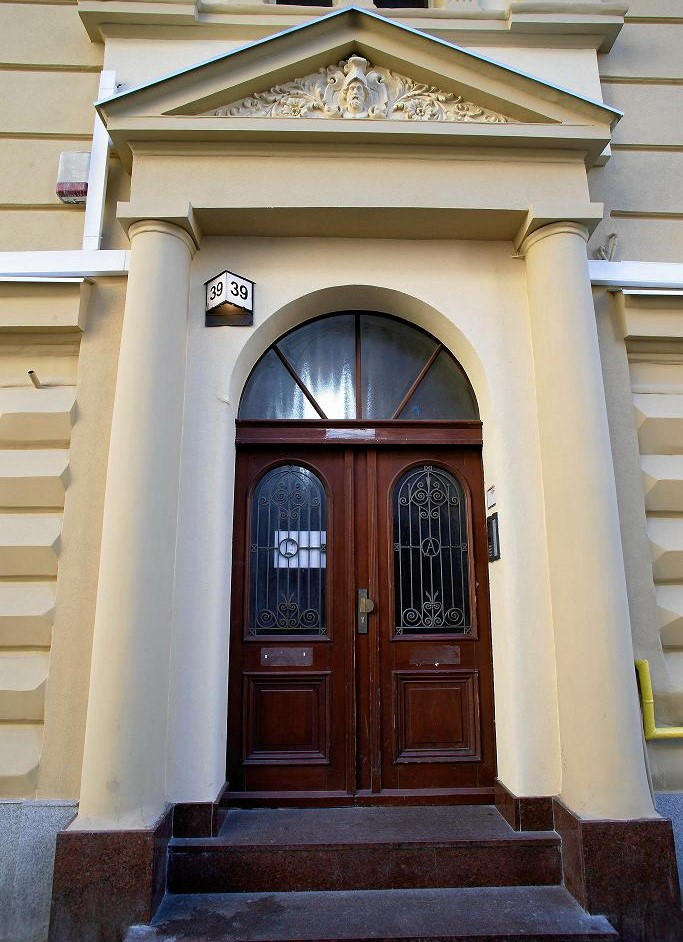
Main gate at 39

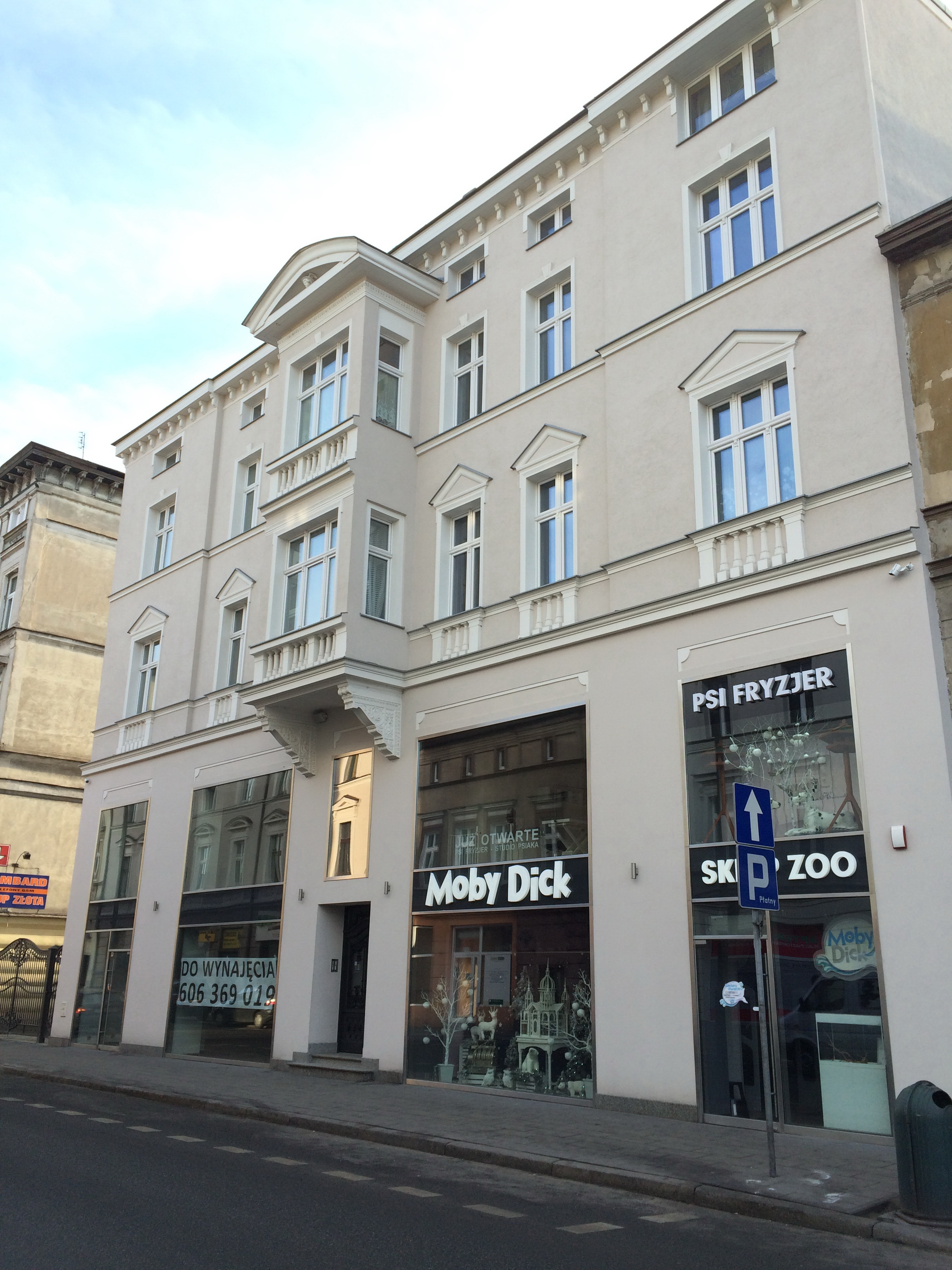
Main elevation at 41

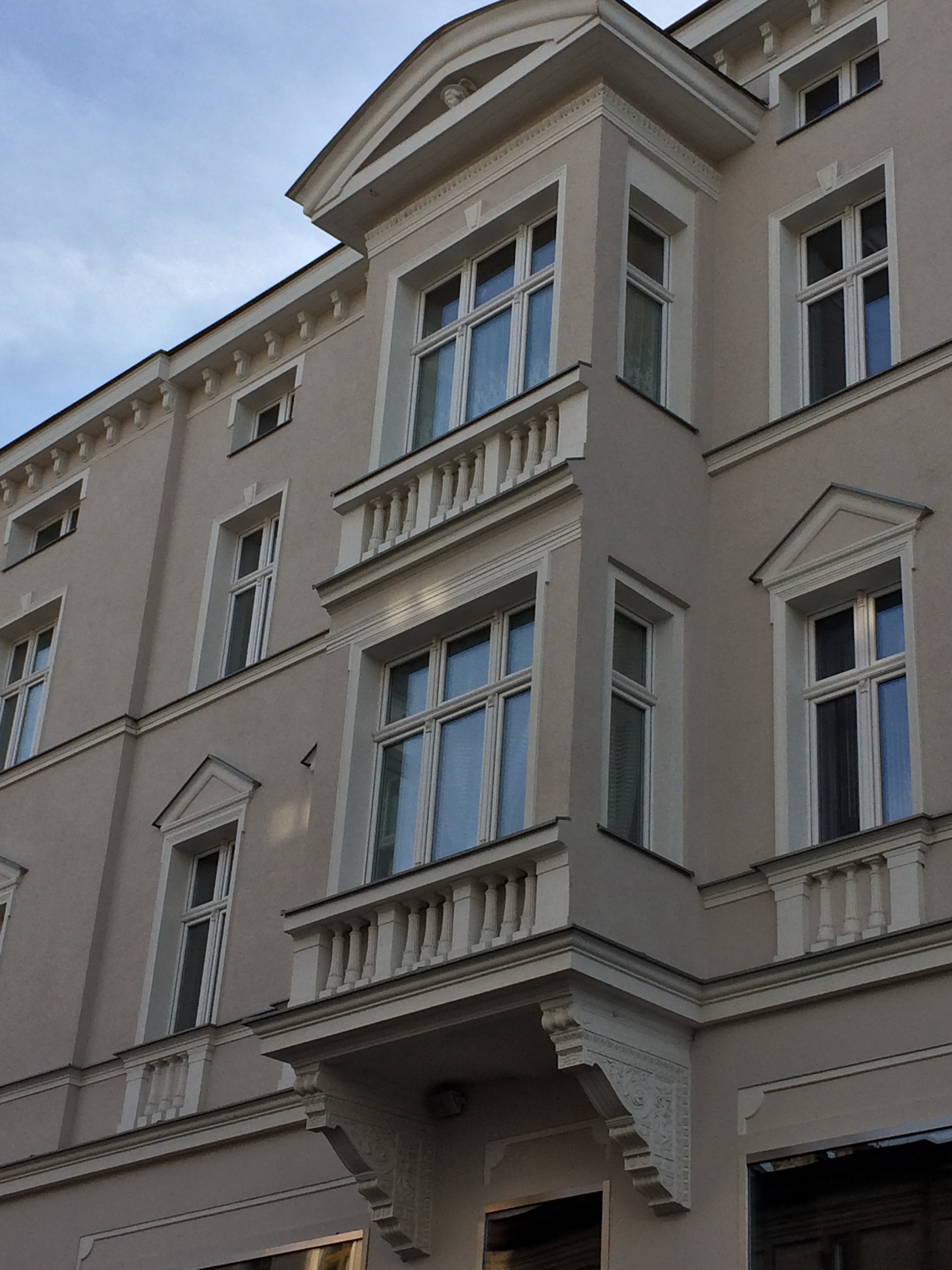
Bay window at 41

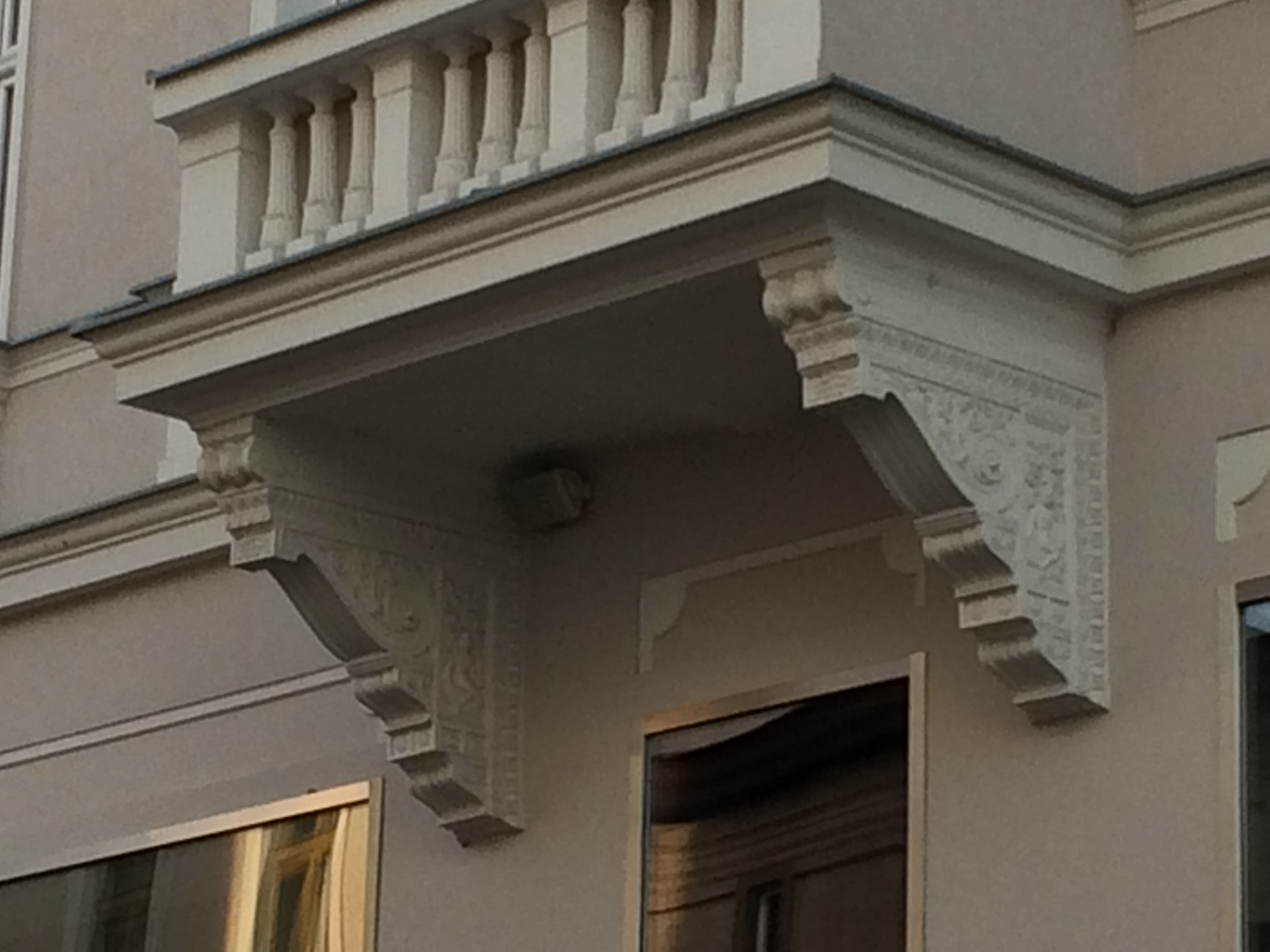
Corbel detail 41

=== Max Schmidt tenement, at 42, corner with Sienkiewicza street ===
1882–1883, by Józef Święcicki and Anton Hoffmann

Neo-Renaissance

The building, then at Elisabethstraße 42a, was a commission from Max Schmidt, a teacher. It is one of the first realizations of Józef Święcicki together with his stepfather, Anton Hoffman, a master bricklayer.

Recently renovated, the elevation boasts neo-Renaissance forms inspired by the Italian Cinquecento: bossages and simplicity of motifs renders perfectly the symmetry of this house. In the corner giving onto both streets, a remarkable bay window on two levels, flanked at each floor by lean columns emphasizes this portion of the facade. In his next realizations, Józef Święcicki will elaborate further on his architectural style, adding more details and features, like building at Tenement at Freedom Square 1 (1896) or at 1/3 Stary Port (1893–1905).

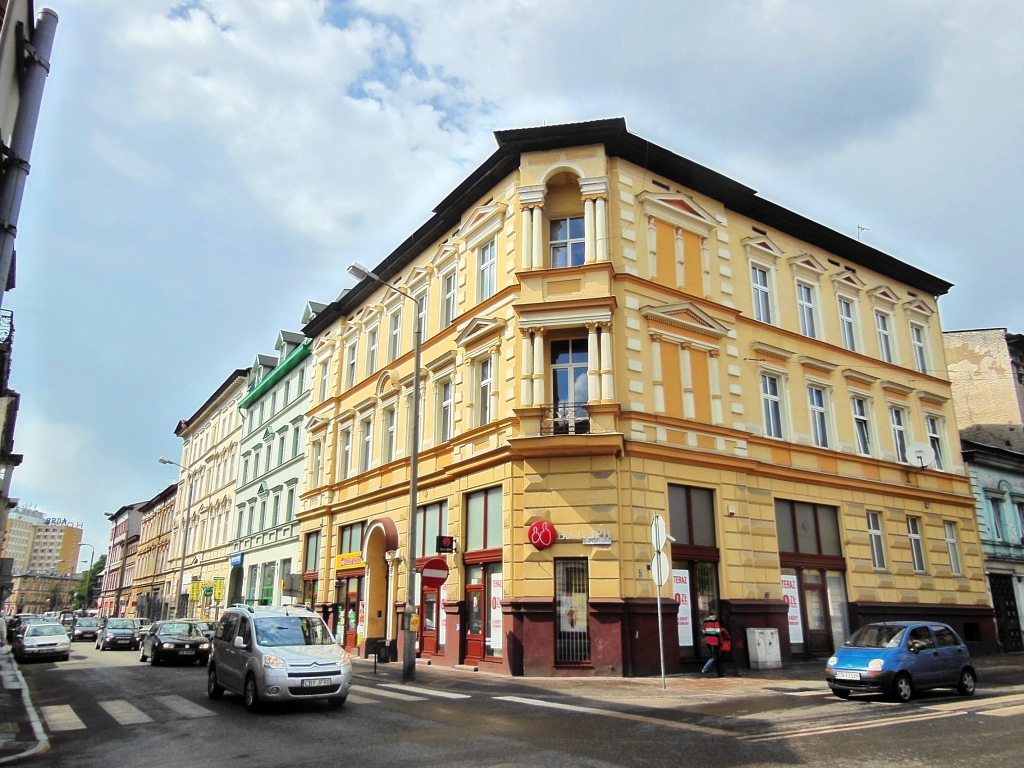
View from streets crossing

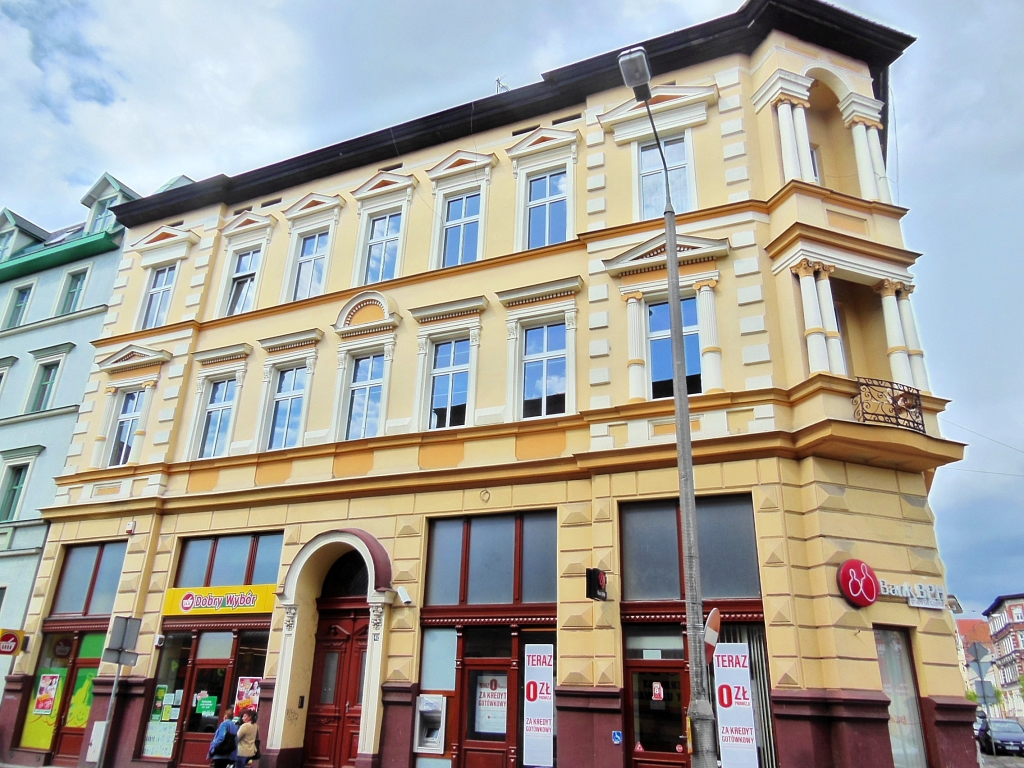
Facade onto Śniadecki street

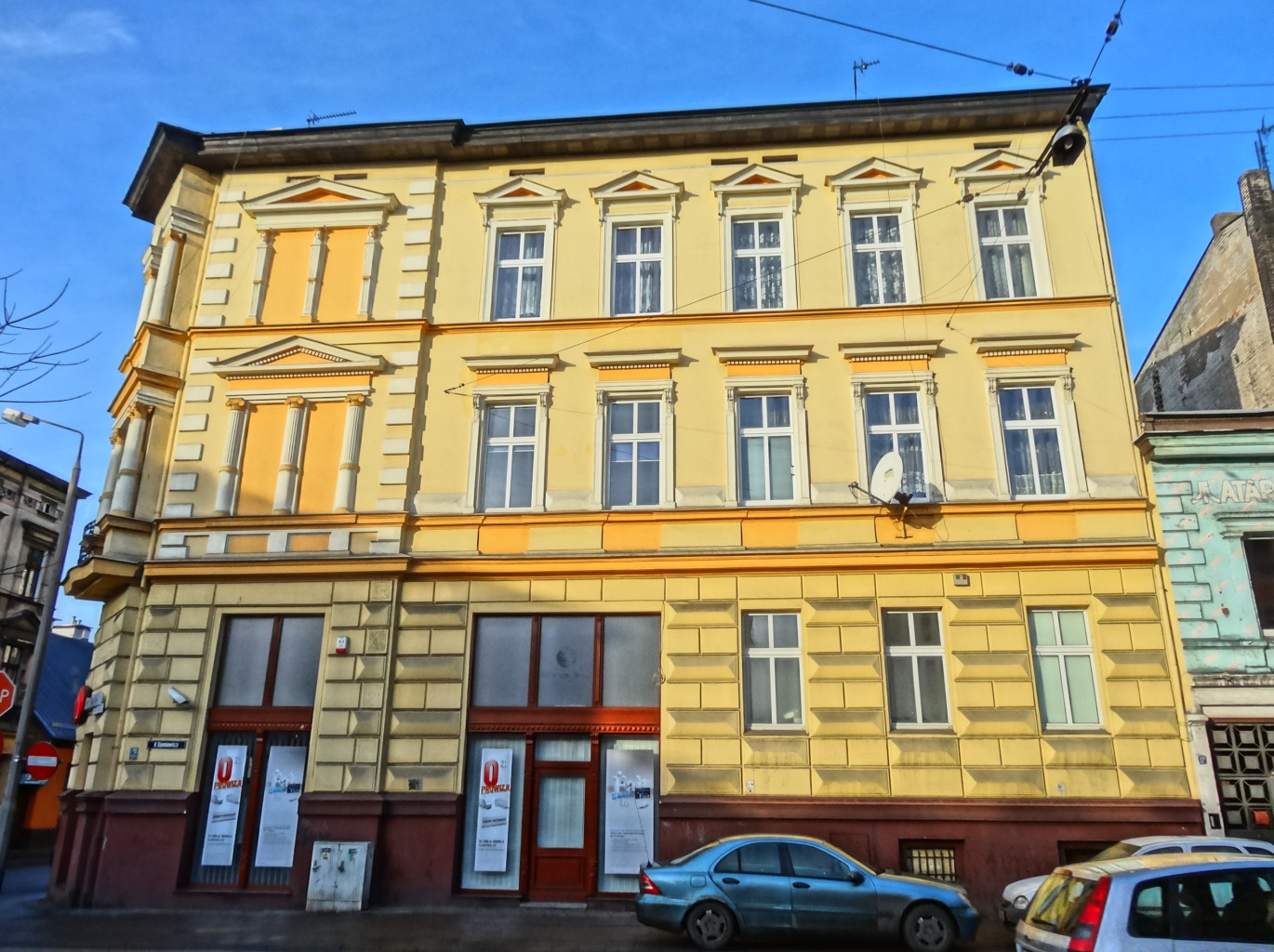
Facede onto Henryk Sienkiewicz street

=== Tenement at 43 ===
1876-1877

Eclecticism

The building at then Elisabethstraße 22 had for first landlord Mr Rosenberg, who used the building as a rental business.

The renovated facade exposes a nice wrought iron balcony, overlooking the large wooden double door onto the street. The left part of the building is much more decorated with bossage motifs and pilasters and pediment on windows.

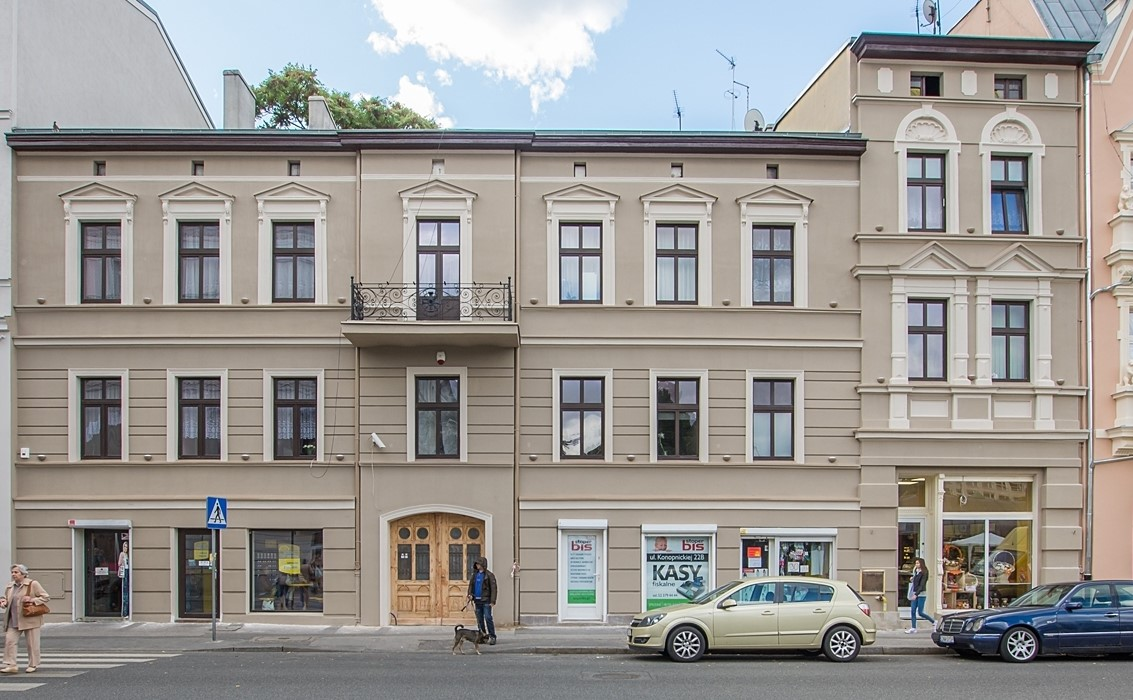
Main frontage

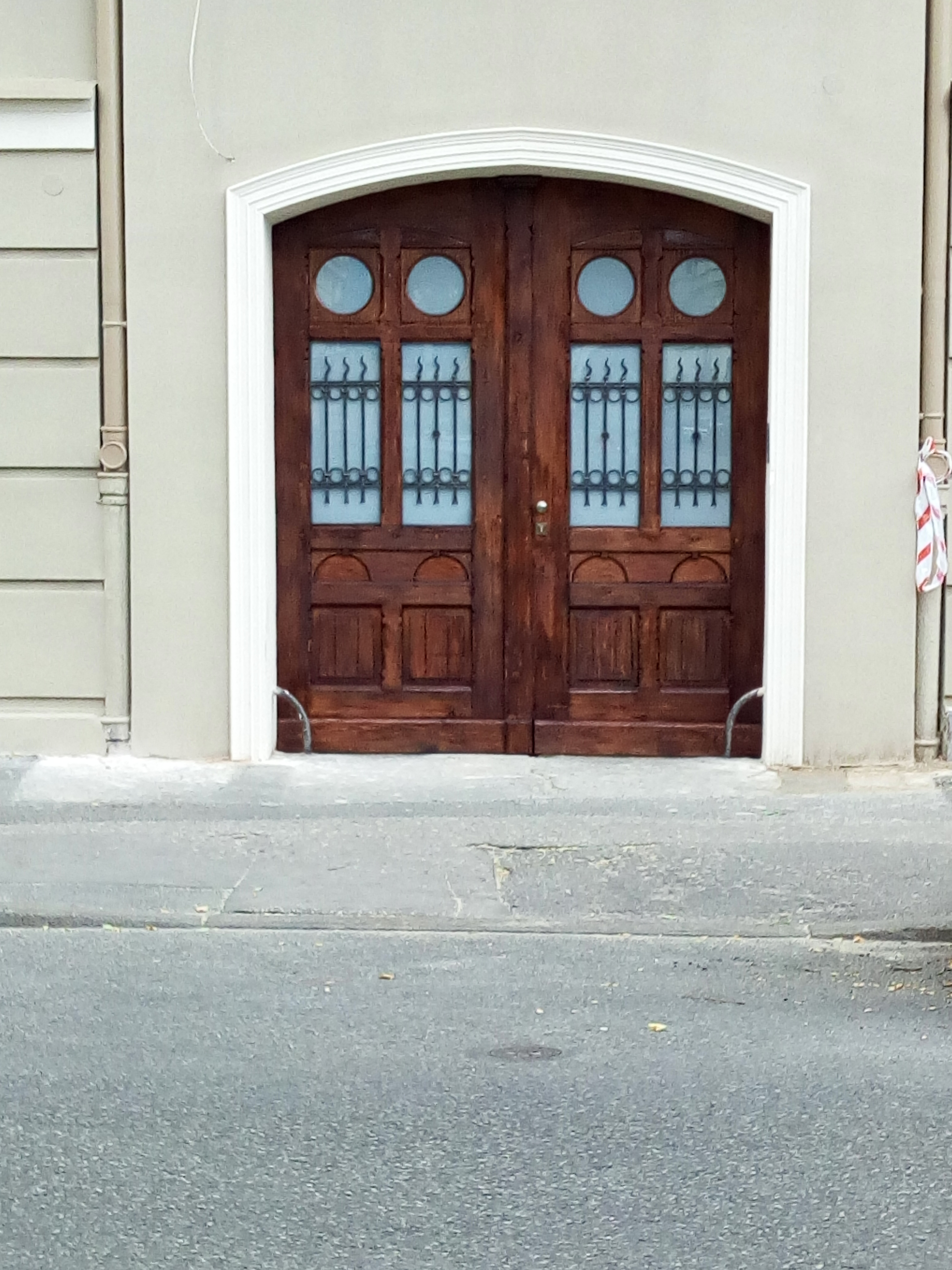
Entrance door

=== Tenement at 45 ===
Registered on Kuyavian-Pomeranian Voivodeship heritage list, Nr.A/1658, May 23, 2014

1896-1897

Eclecticism

The building, then at Elisabethstraße 23 was the property of Robert Winkler, a merchant, also landlord of Elisabethstraße 24 (Nr.47).

The building strikes by its original shape and its rich architectural decoration. The facade is asymmetrical, the only bay window is unbalanced, with quarter circle wrought-iron balconies flanking its left side. Both balconies have a bear cub holding a shield that stands in the corner: it is a reminder of the past activity of a metal craftwork company in the district. An elaborate frieze runs between first and second level, and two windows are topped with triangular pediments: the one on the right side is adorned with a bas-relief of bearded male head with a hat. On the top of the facade stands a sundial, neighboured by two finials. At street level, one can notice the grand portal, crowned by a mask of a beast.

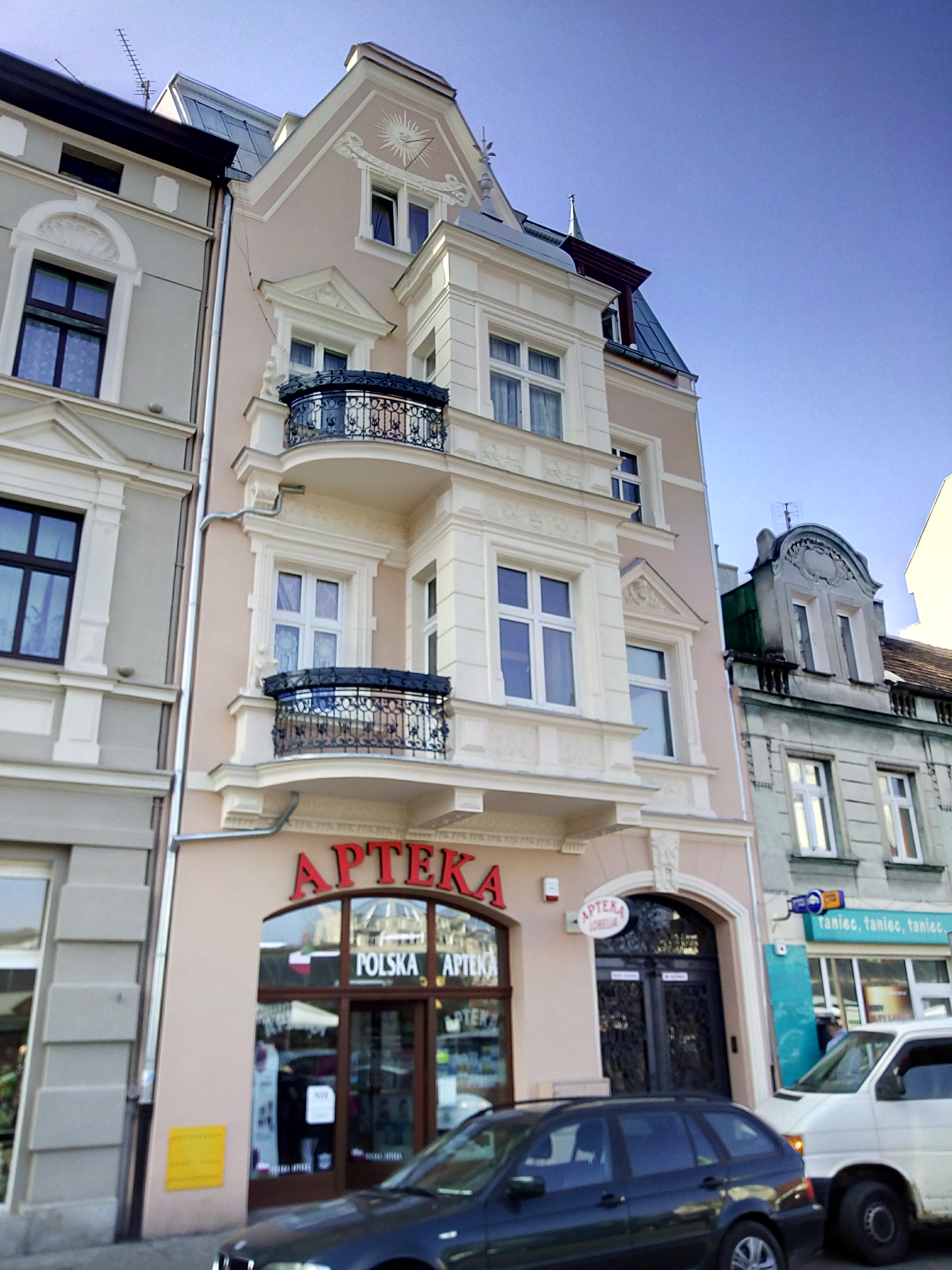
Main frontage

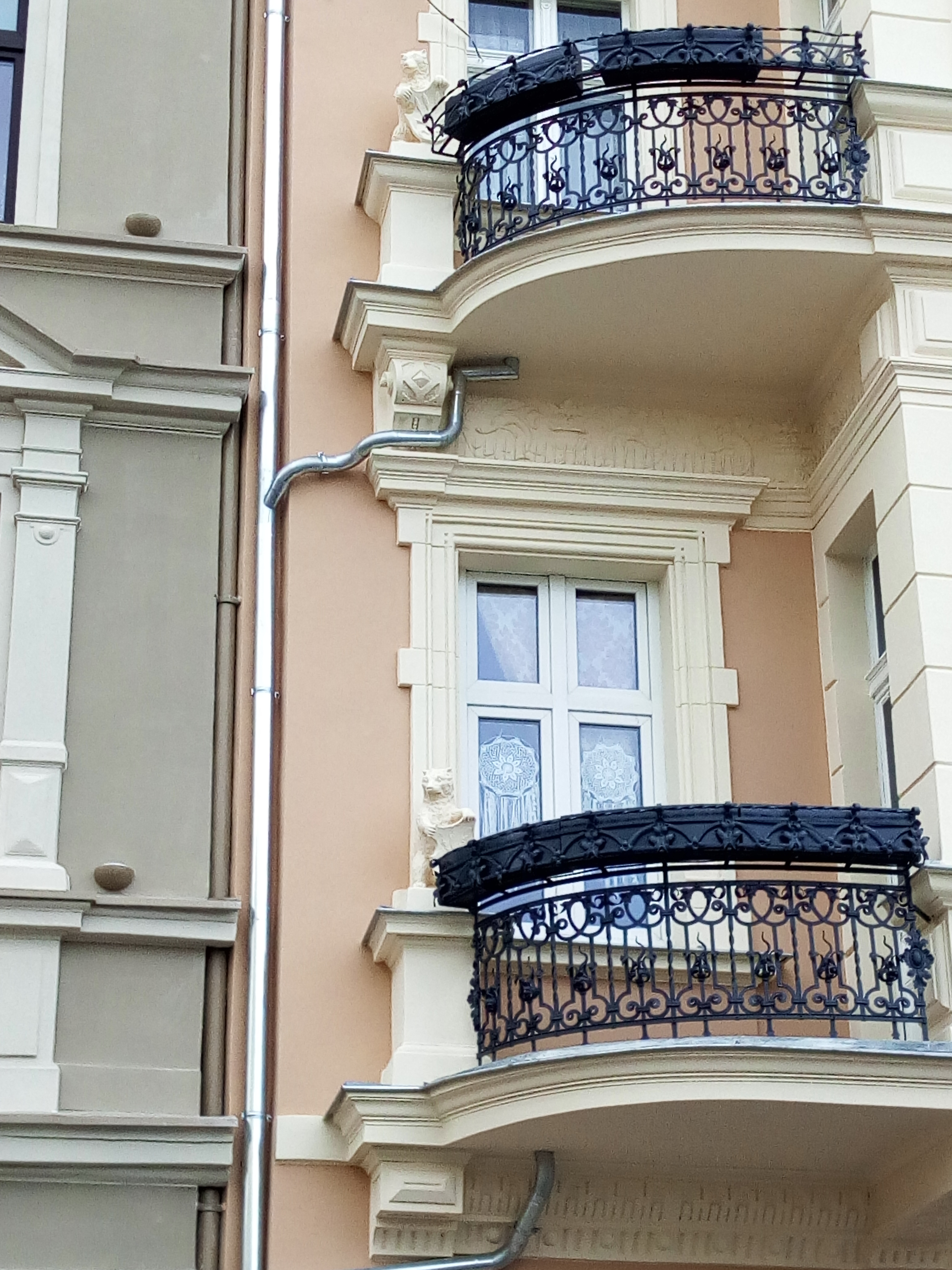
Bear cubs at the balconies

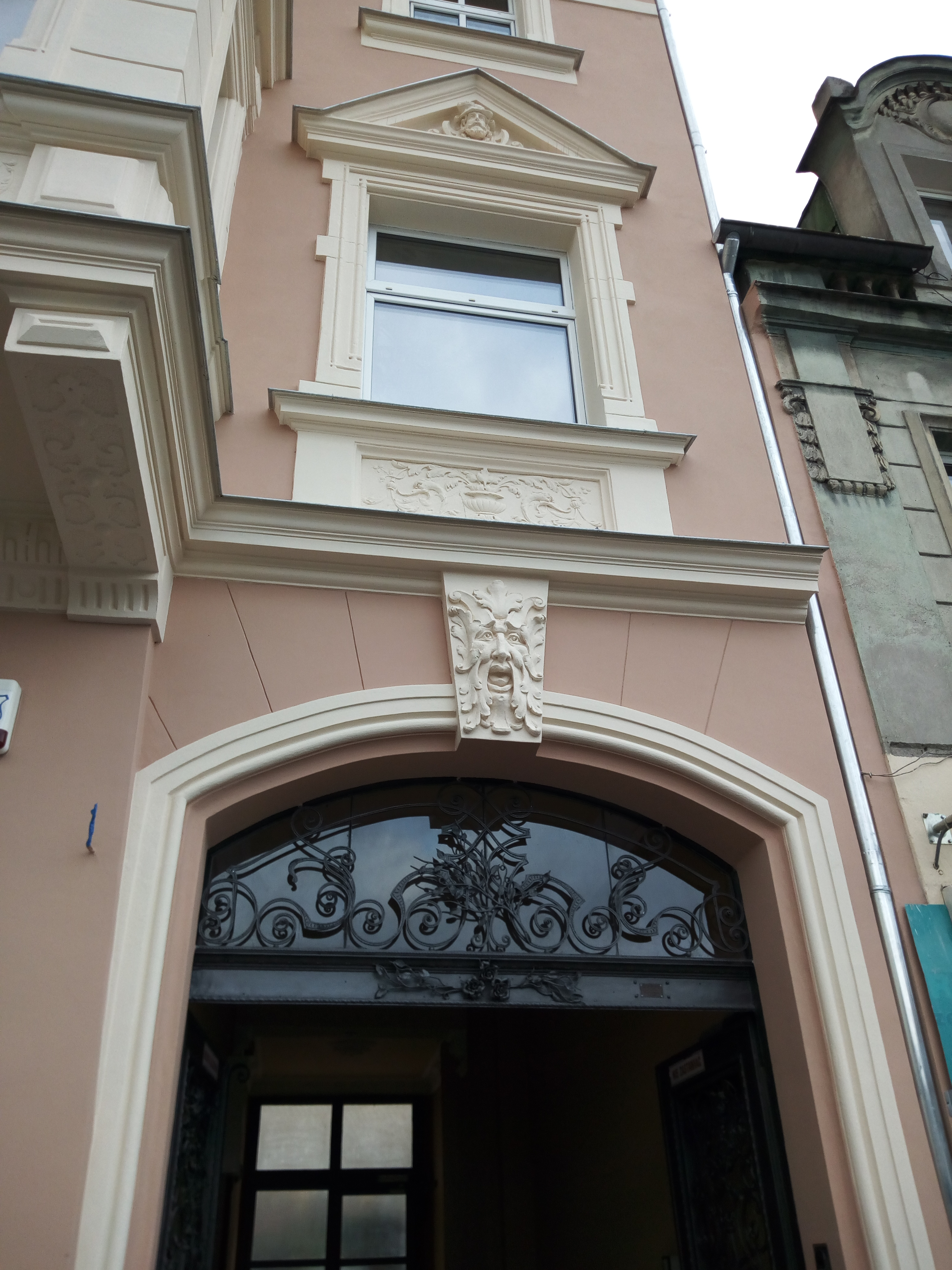
Portal and gate

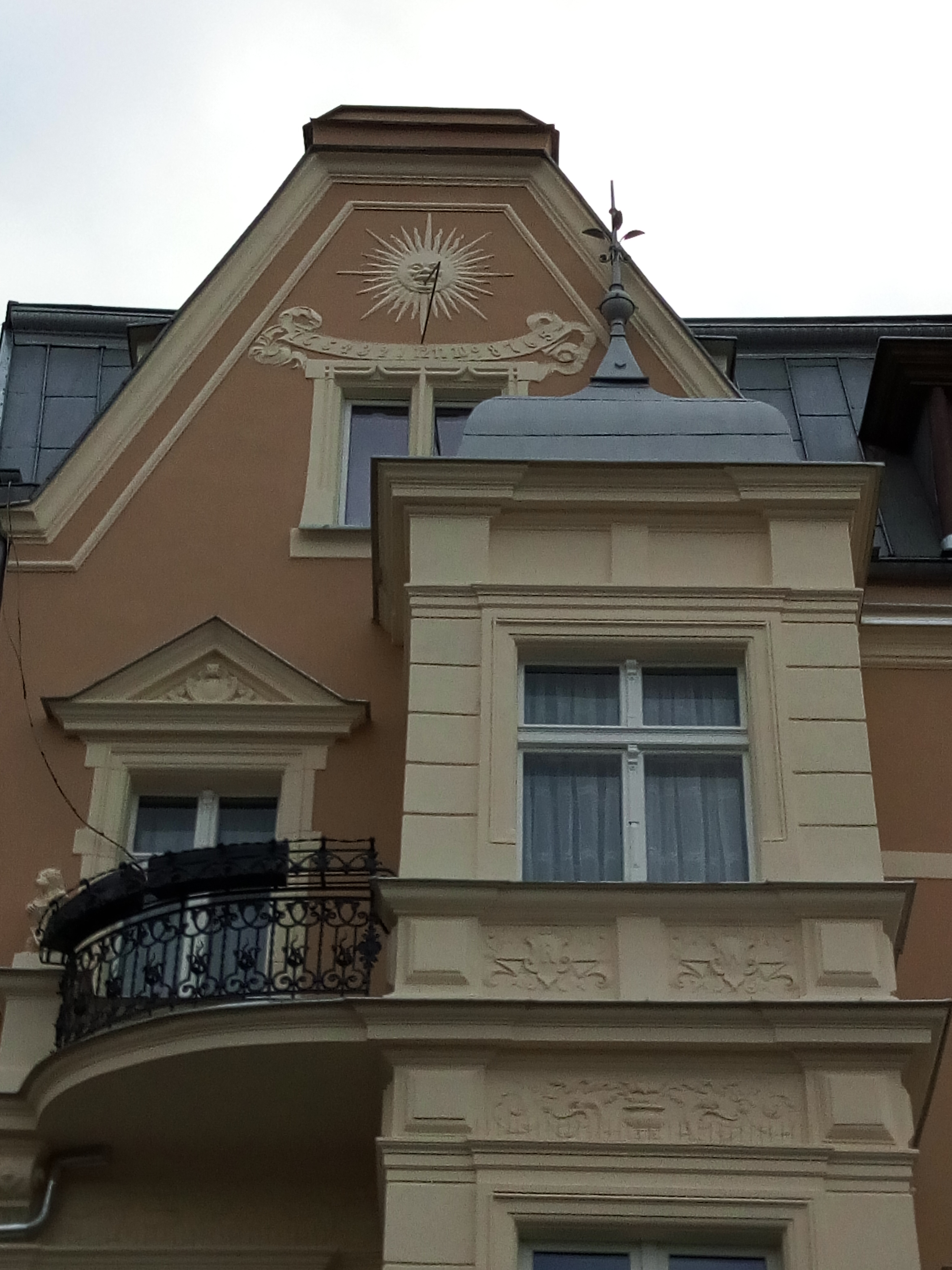
Top sundial

=== Tenement at 46 ===
1882, Józef Święcicki and Anton Hoffmann

Neoclassical architecture, Neo-Renaissance

The building at Elisabethstraße 41 was the property of Max Schmidt: one year later (1883), he commissioned the same architect for the building at Nr.42. Józef Święcicki realized the edifice on a project by its step father Anton Hoffman.

Beautifully restored in 2015–2016, the facade boasts a ground floor with bossage and a main gate flanked by columns and topped by a triangular pediments, like a temple. Upper floors display typical Neo-Renaissance details, with adorned pediments, pilasters and an inconspicuous figure head in the top triangular gable tympanum.

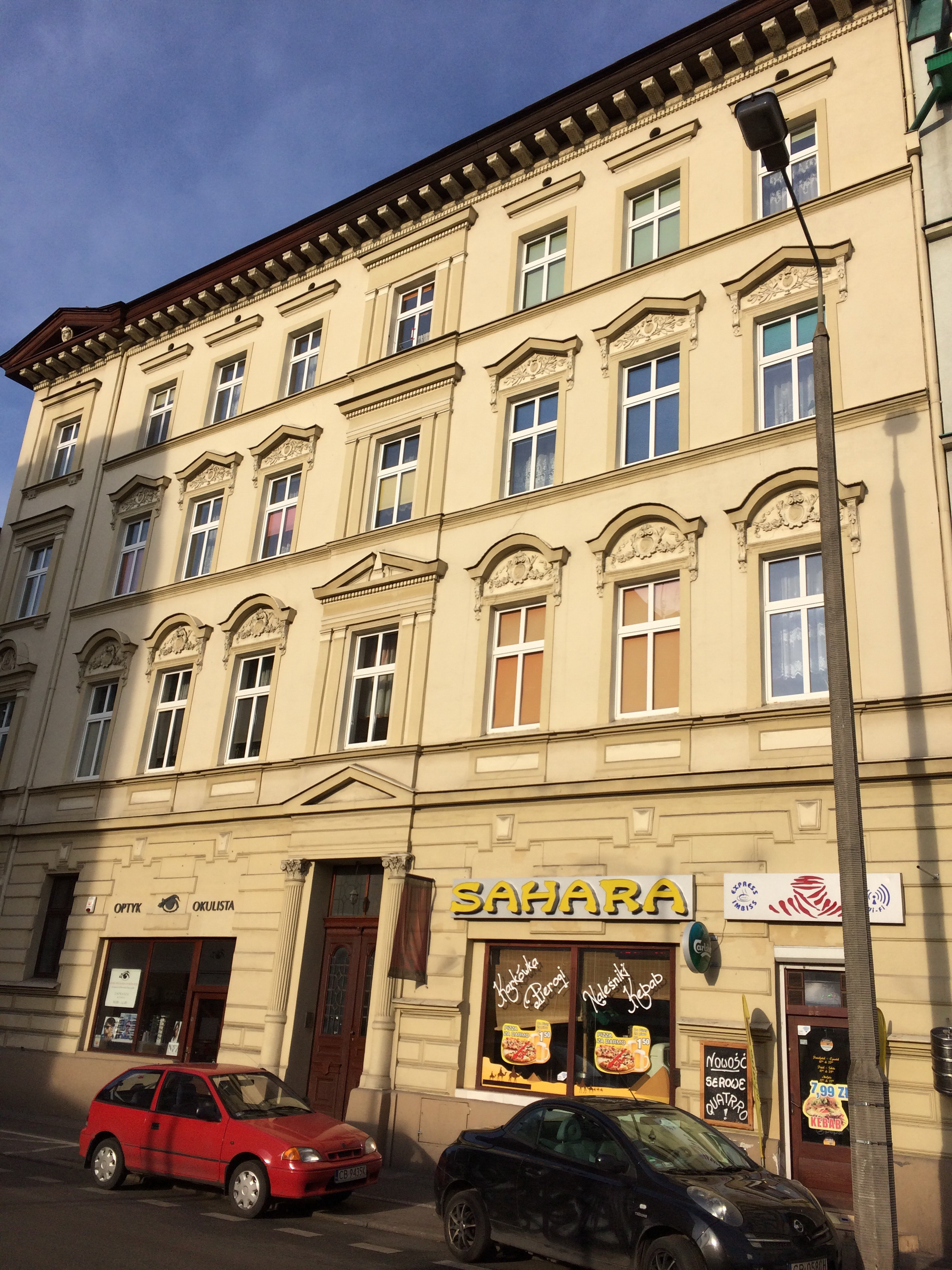
Elevation on the street

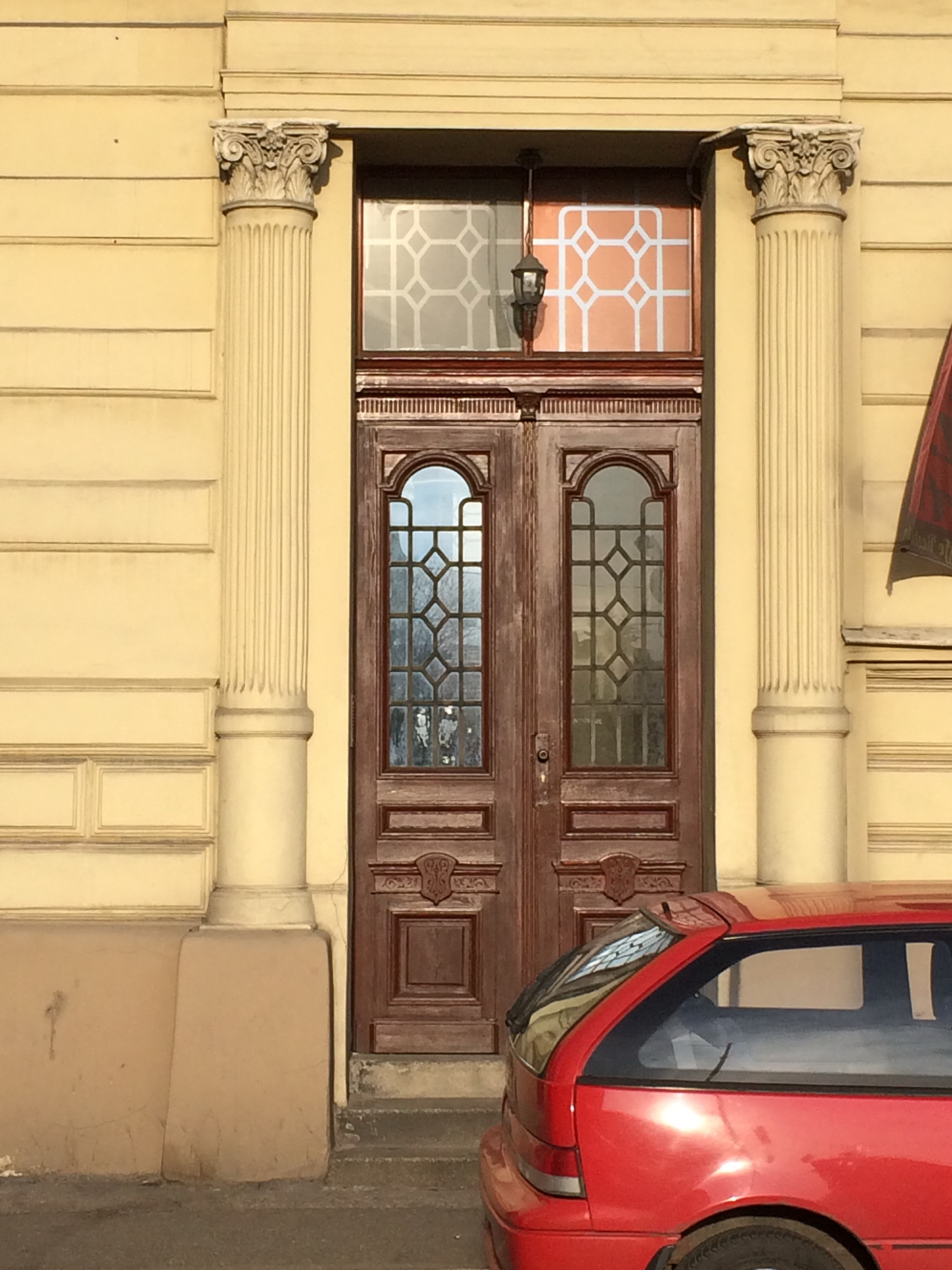
Main gate

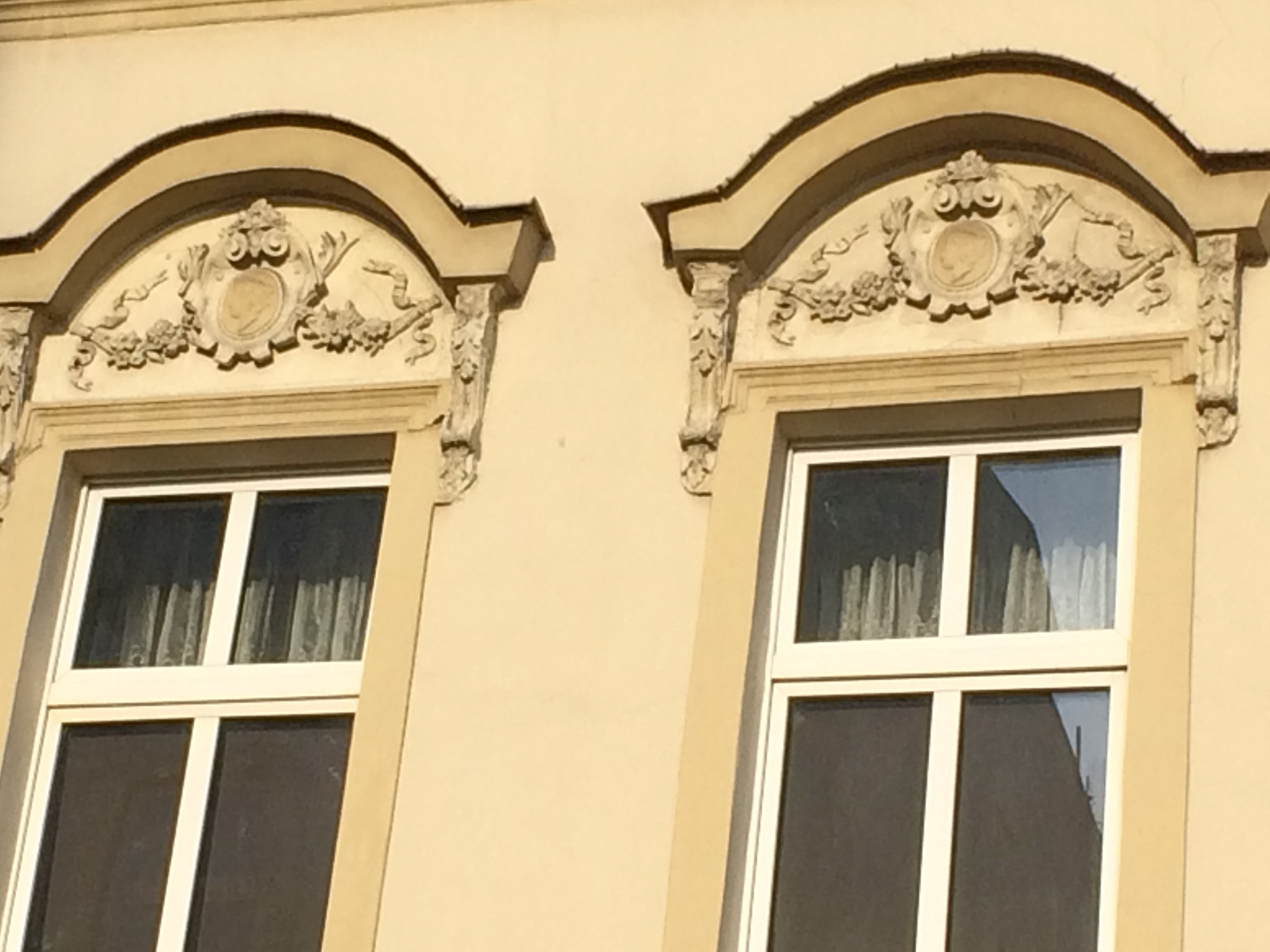
Detail of pediments

=== Tenement at 47 ===
1860s

Eclecticism

The building at Elisabethstraße 24 was the property of Robert Winkler, a merchant, also landlord of Elisabethstraße 23 (Nr.46). Nr.47 was the one he was registered as living in. In the 1920s-1930s, a local well-known industrialist, Franciszek Błoch, lived there.

The long facade, with only one floor boasts a beautiful decoration on top of the gate, with two sphinx like woman figured shapes support another vegetal decoration with a mask. Traces of pilasters are still visible on the first floor, crowned by a full-length balustrade. The two ogee gables are also ornamented.

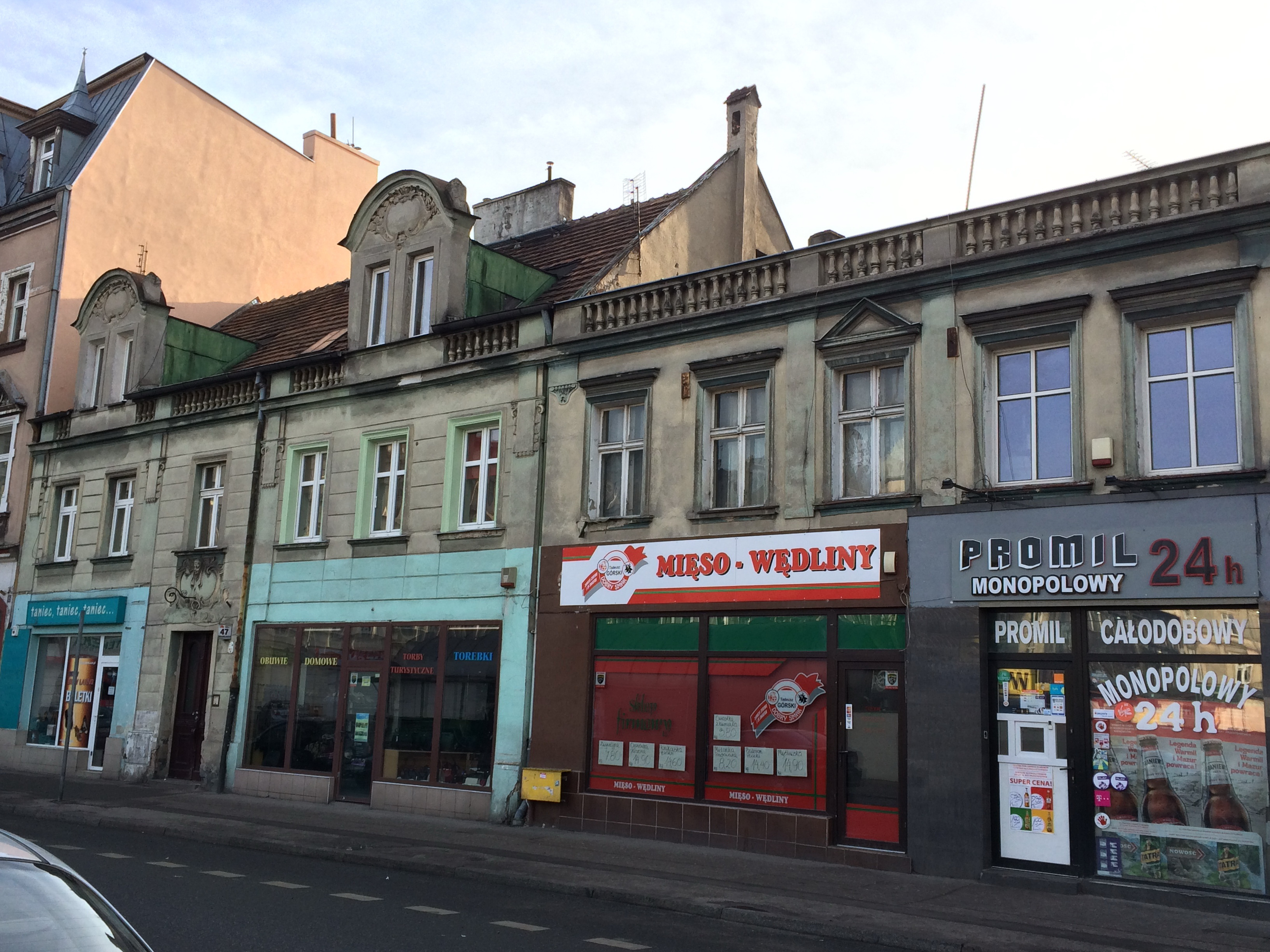
Main elevation

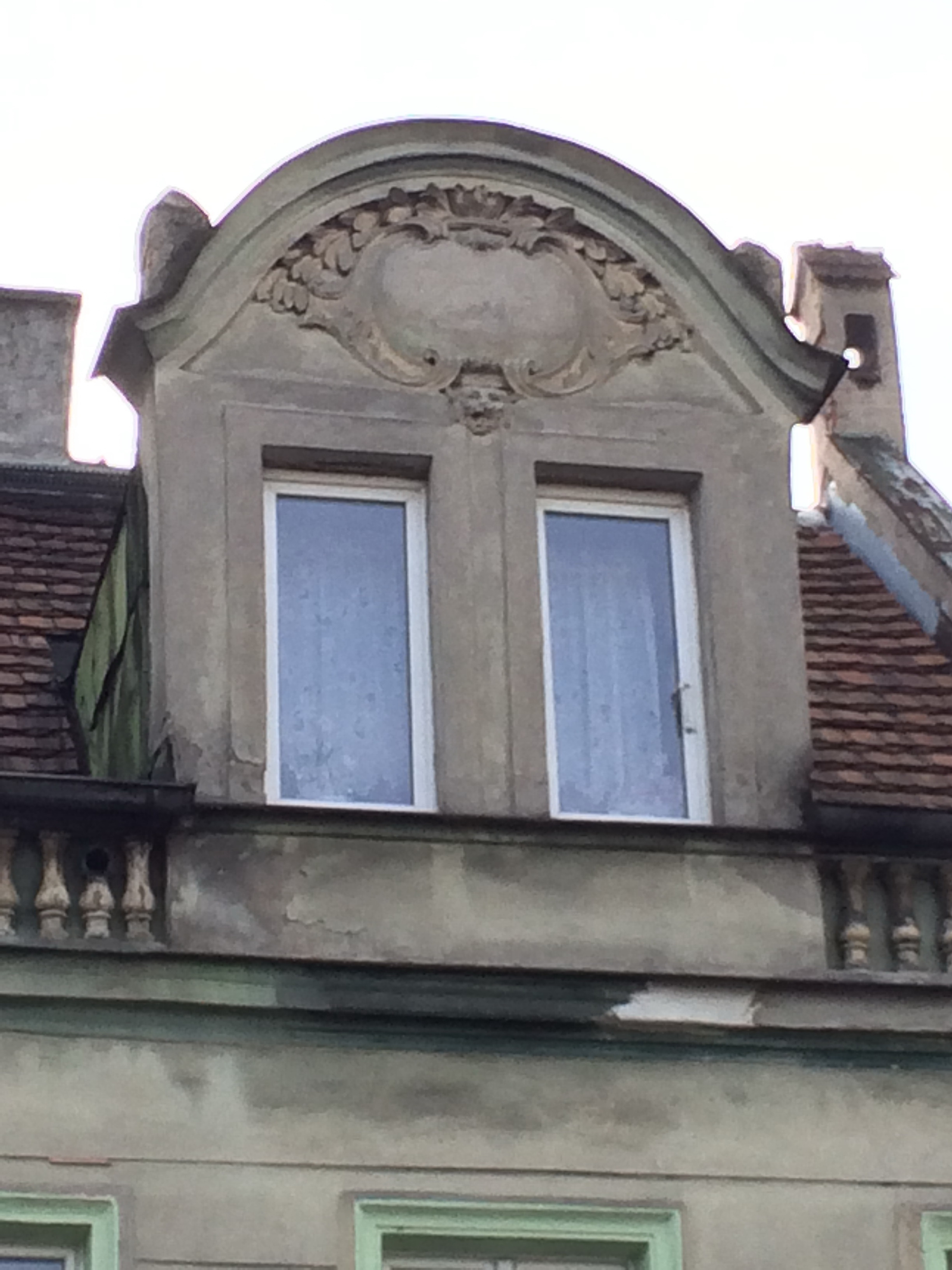
Gable

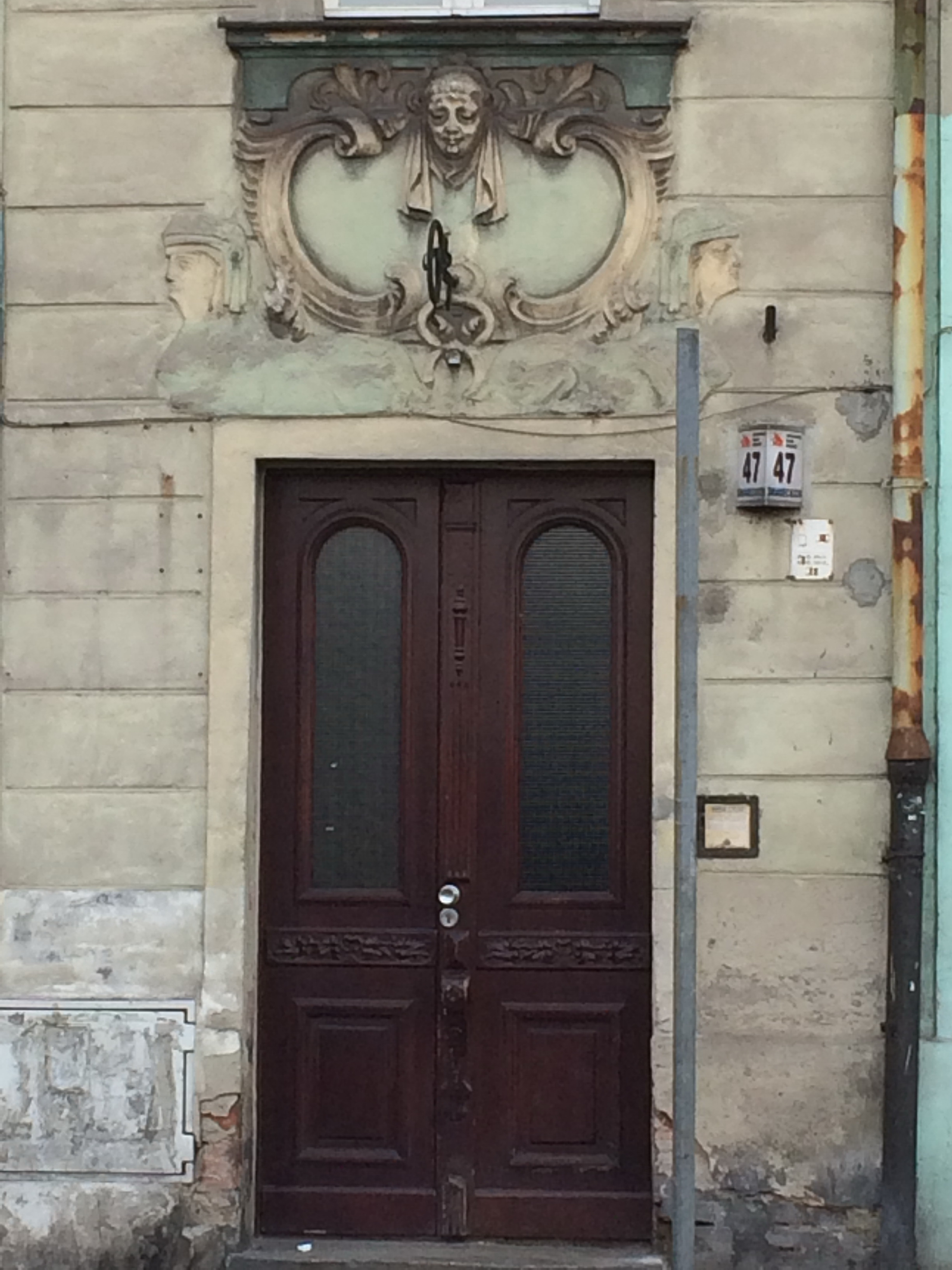
Main gate

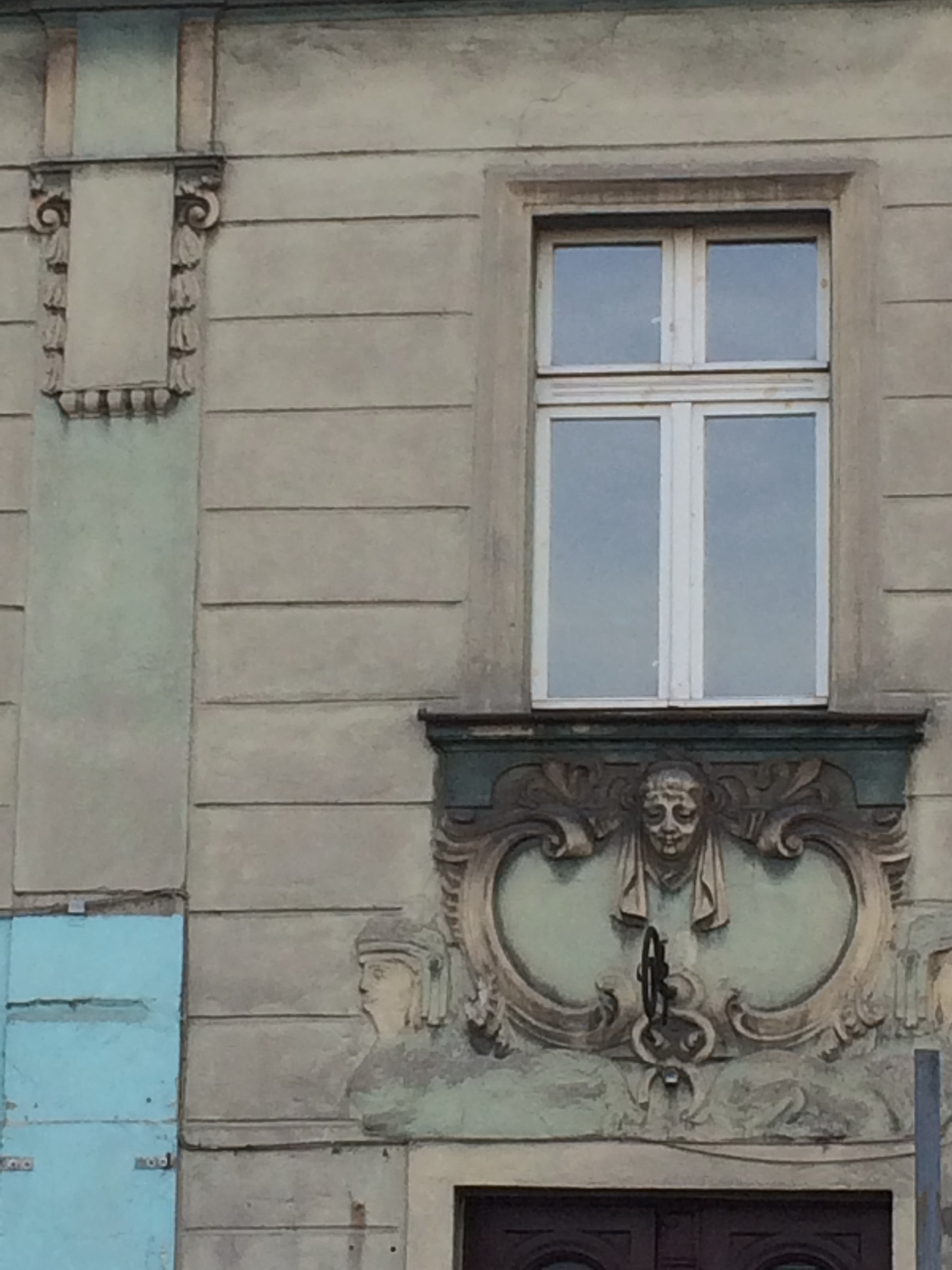
Detail of the facade

=== Tenement at 48 ===
1883, by Józef Święcicki

Neo-Renaissance

The building, then at Elisabethstraße 40, was built for a merchant, Leonhard Fitting. The designer, famous local architect Józef Święcicki, used a project drawn by his stepfather, Anton Hoffman, a master bricklayer. Another merchant, Otto Barth, took over the property at the end of the 19th century.

Recently renovated, the elevation displays nice ornamentation, from cartouches to pediments.

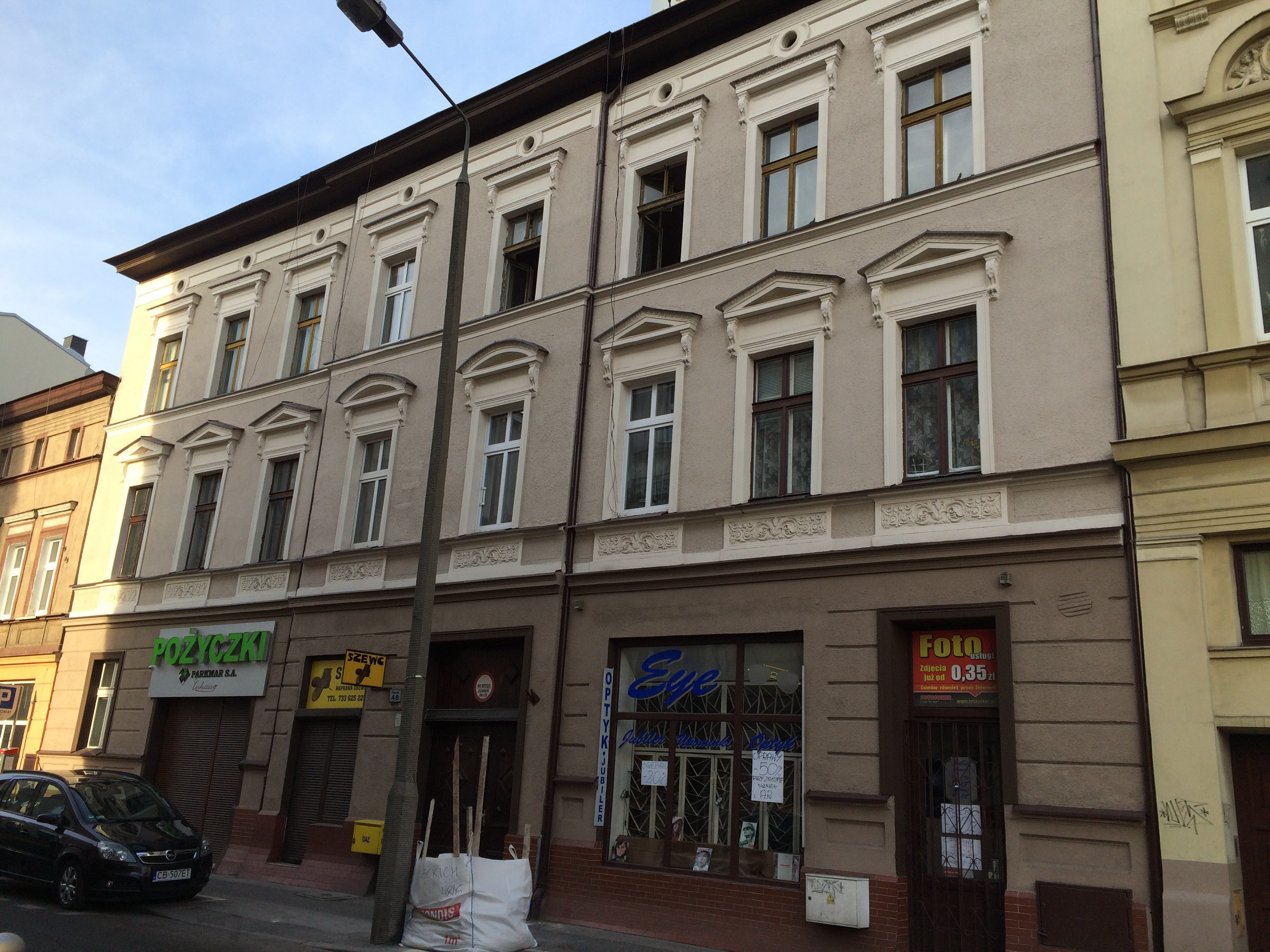
Main elevation

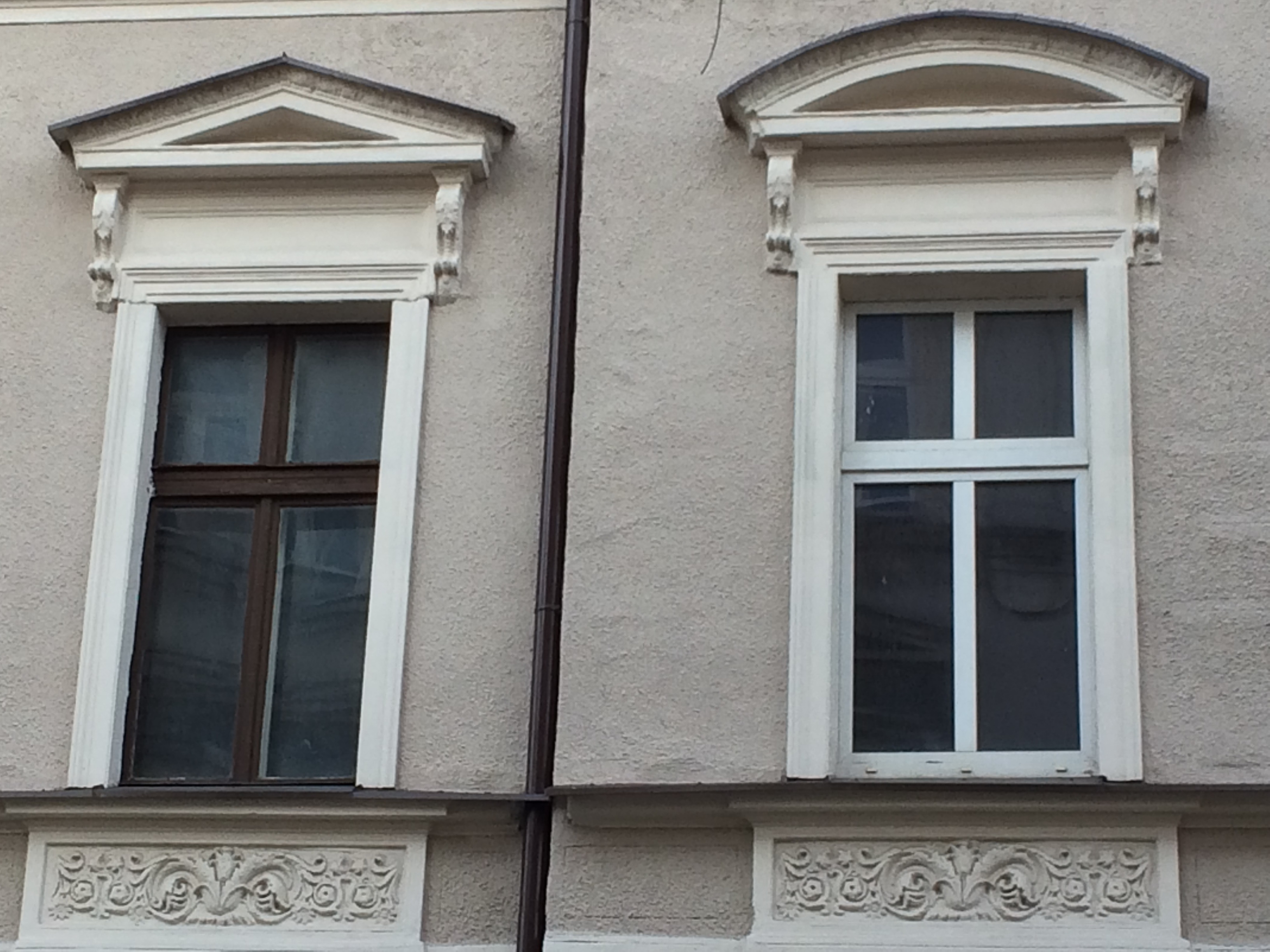
Motifs detail

=== Tenement at 49 ===
1911-1912, by Alfred Schleusener and Georg Baesler

Art Nouveau-Modern architecture

The tenement stands in the corner with Jan Matejko Street. In Bromberg's time, address was Elisabethstraße 25: owners were registered as "Ms Sendler and Genossen". In 1915, an architect, Walter Findeisen, lived in this house. The building housed till 2019 the Honorary Consul of the Federal Republic of Germany in Bydgoszcz, when it moved to 19 Dworcowa Street.

The tenement stands out of the local urban environment with its lean and high features. Due to its late inception (1910s), the building has been erected according to late Art Nouveau canons, thus it catches the eye among late 19th century edifices. The house architecture is underlined on the one hand by long vertical lines without any ornament (art), broken up on the first floor by horizontal bossages, and on the other hand by two massive bay windows and a modest bartizan. Building's elevation has been refurbished in 2015–2016.

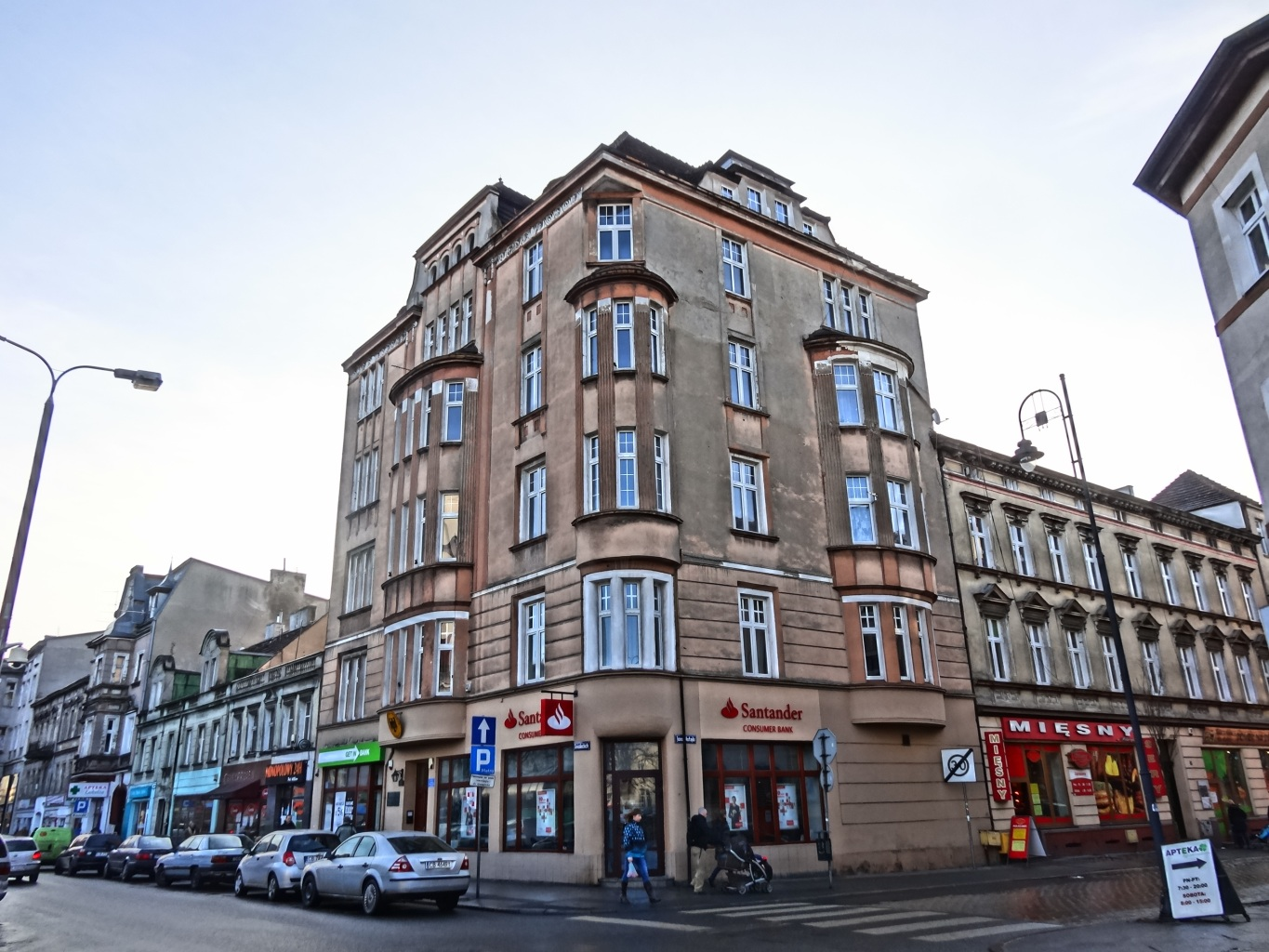
View from the street before renovation

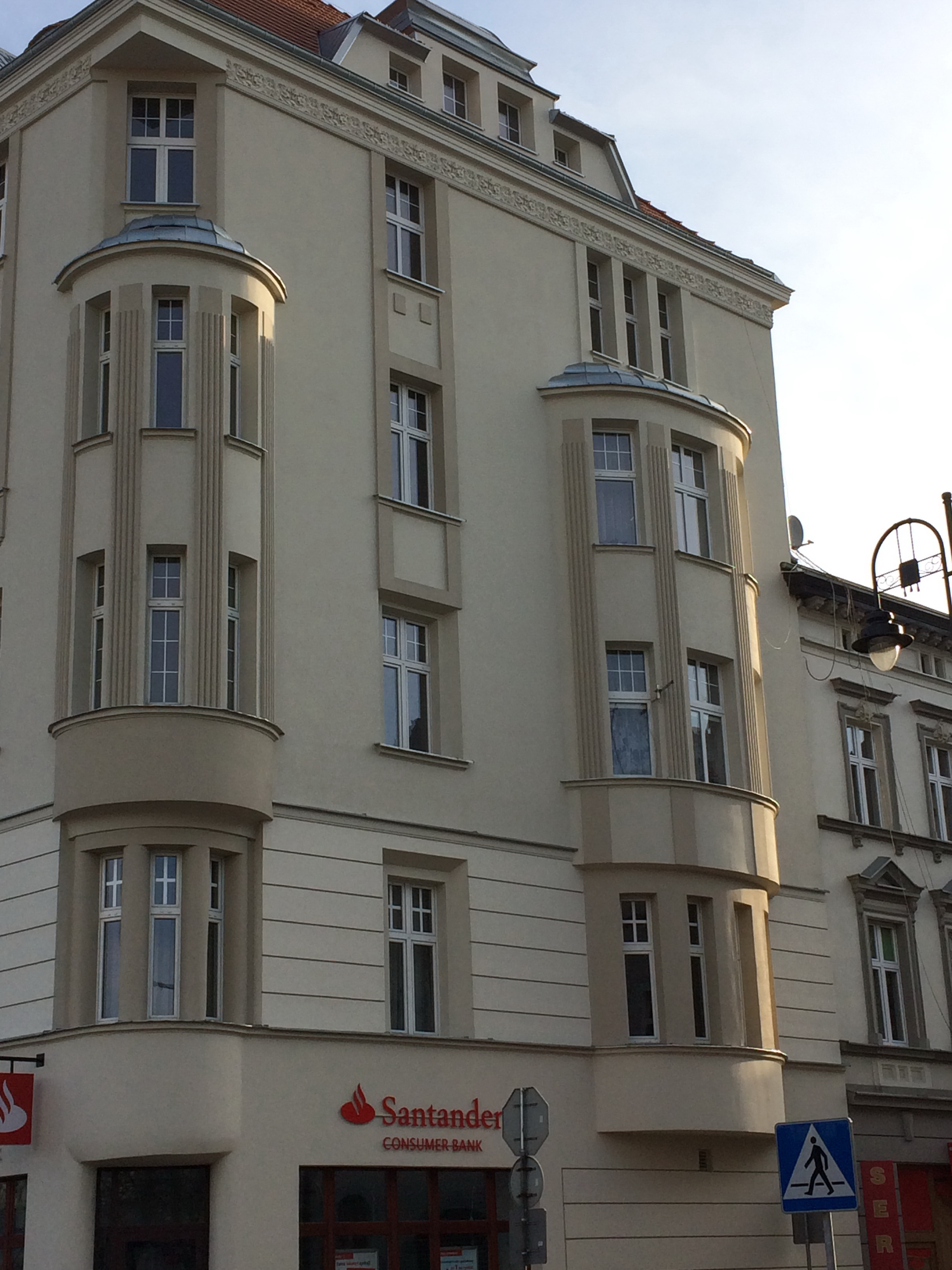
Elevation on Jan Matejko Street

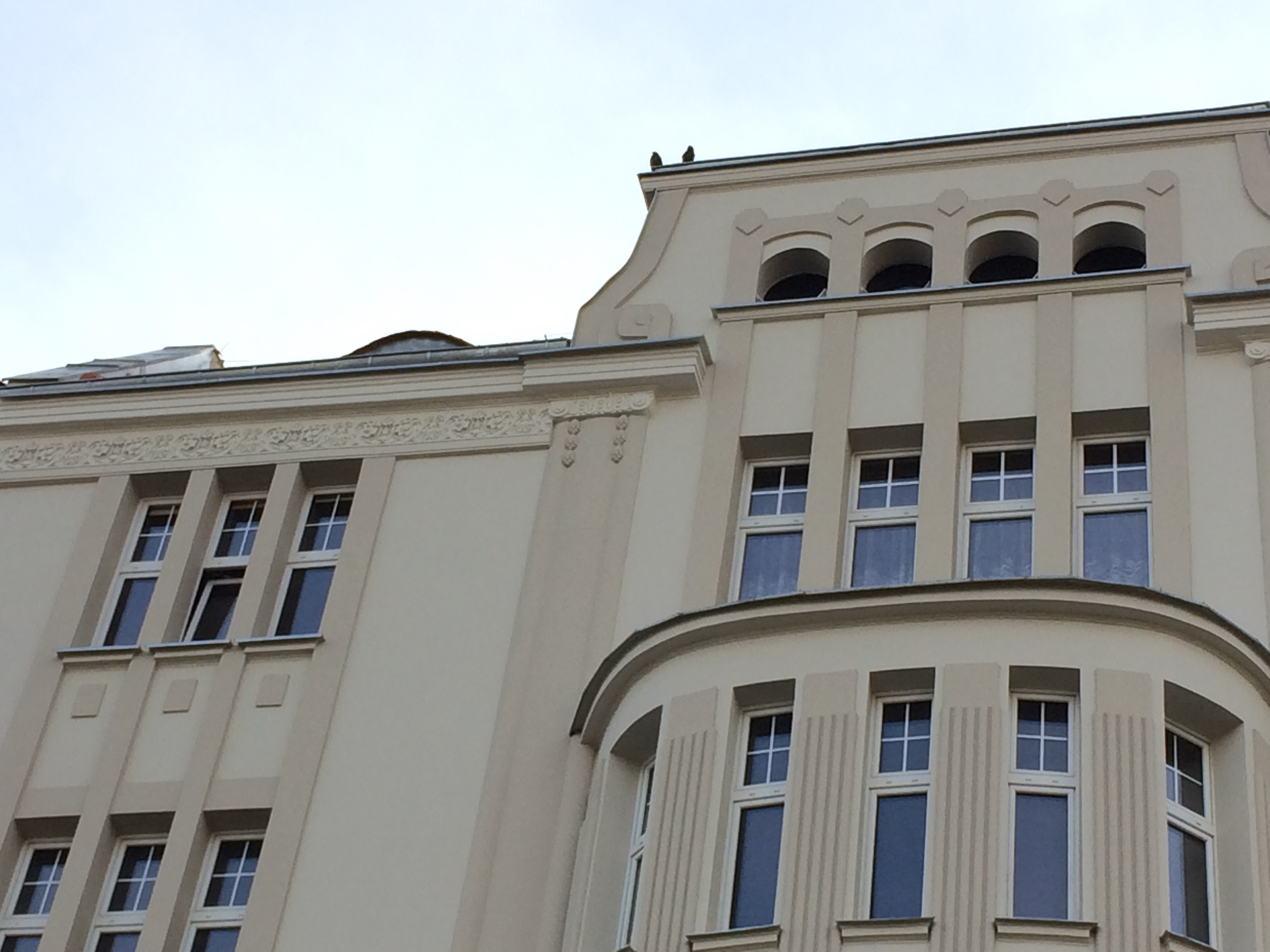
Detail of the upper part of the facade

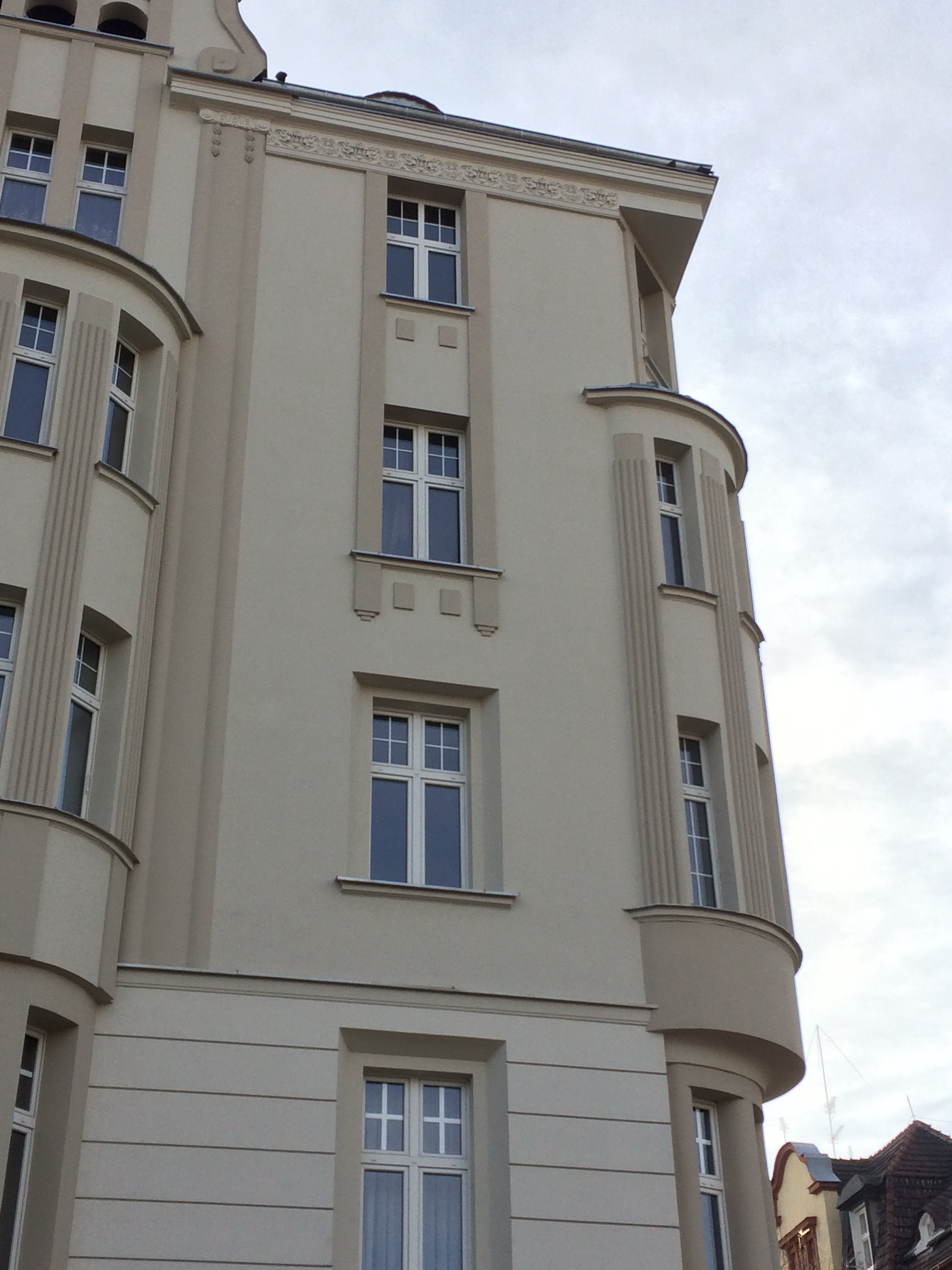
Detail of the bartizan

=== Tenement at 19 Piastkowski Square, corner with Śniadecki Street ===
1882

Eclecticism, Neo-Renaissance

The building, then at Elisabeth Straße 39, was owned by a rentier, Carl Wilhelm Feyertag, living at "Bahnhoffstraße 11" (now 27 Dworcowa Street). He also owned the tenement at Nr.57.

Recently renovated, the elevation is remarkable by its wooden bay window capped by a tented roof, overhanging the corner. A long frieze runs on both frontages.

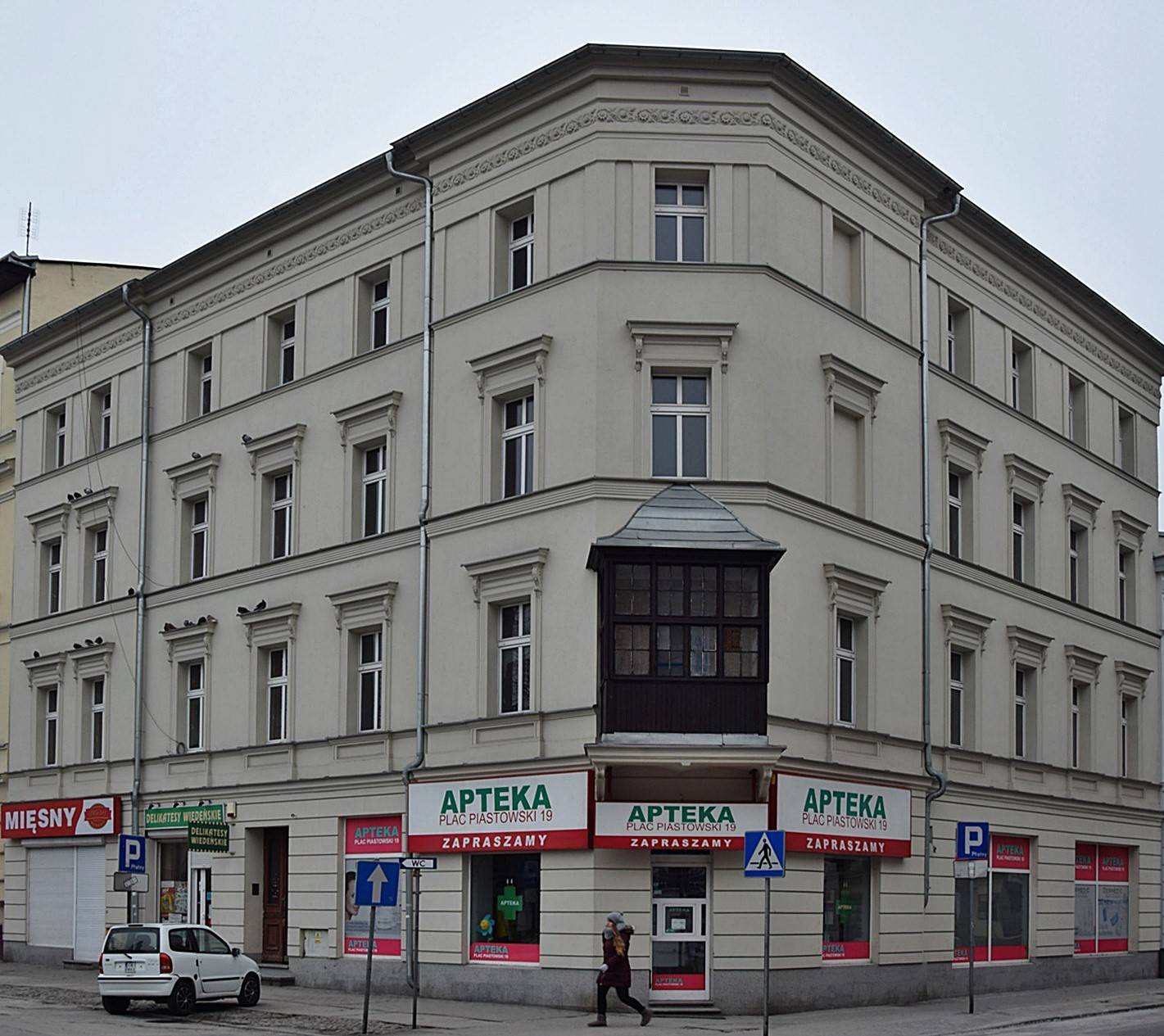
Corner view

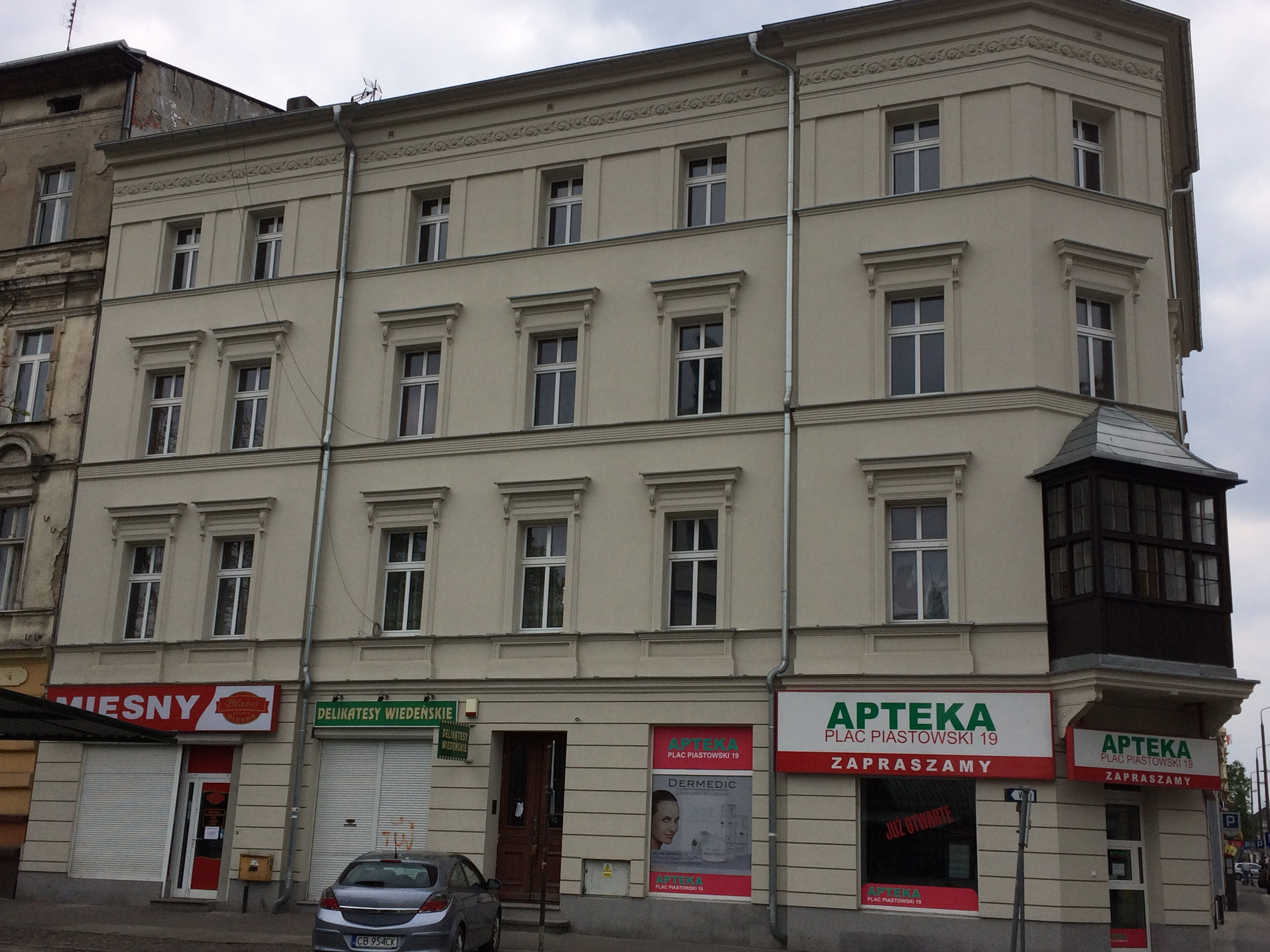
Renovated facade on the square

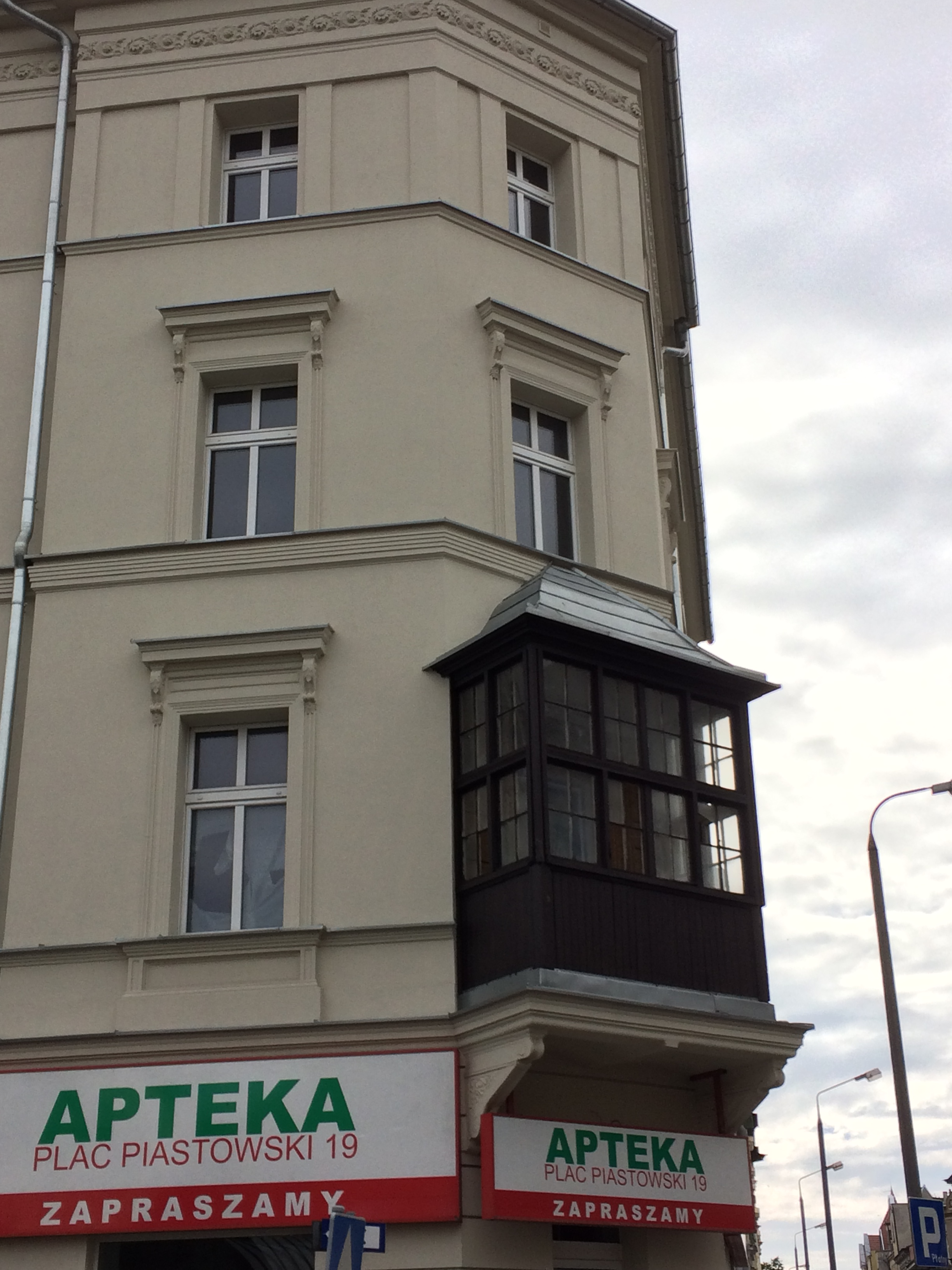
Bay window

=== Tenement at 52, corner with 1 Warsawska street ===
1874

Eclecticism

Original address was Elisabethstraße 38: its first registered holder was Hermann Zindler, a member of the Government chancellery.

The wings of this corner tenement house draw attention towards the double architectural legacy of the Prussian partition and the period of the Polish People's Republic (PRL). The edifice has been refurbished in the last quarter of 2018.

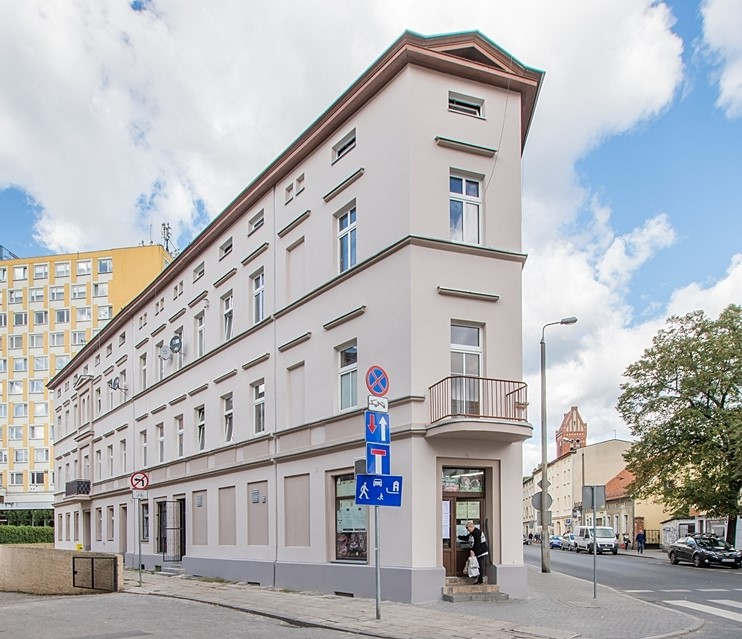
Corner view from Śniadeckich Street

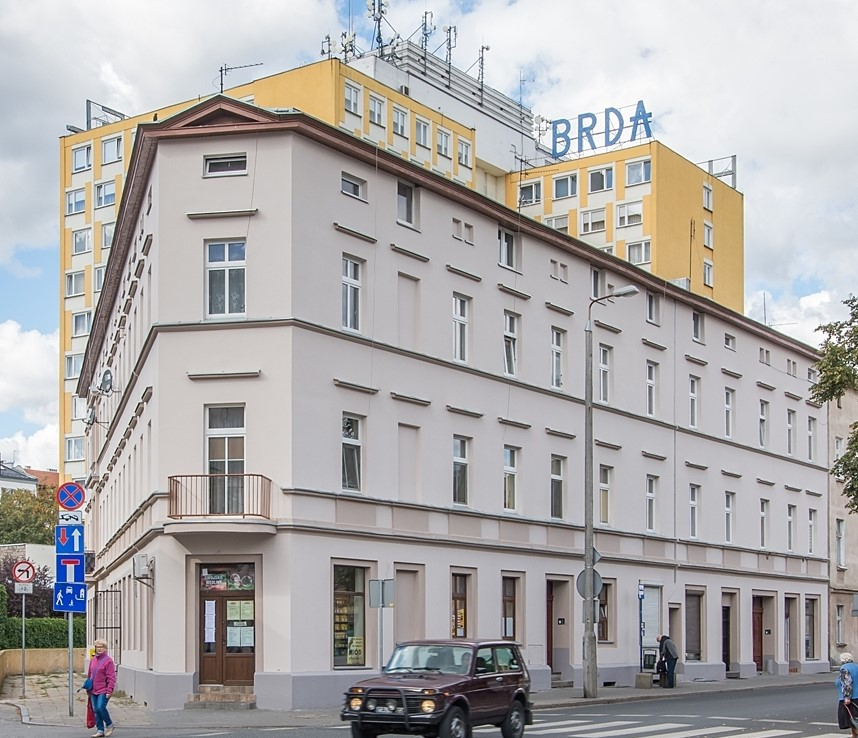
View from Warszawska street

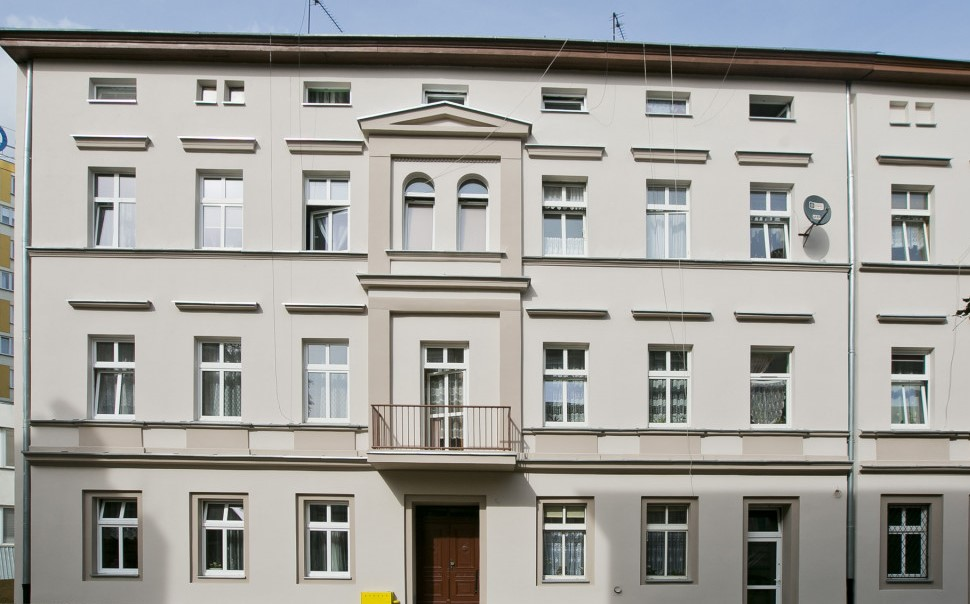
Facade on Śniadeckich Street

=== Tenement at 53 ===
1894-1895

Eclecticism, elements of Neo-Baroque

Originally at Elisabethstraße 27, it was the property of a real estate owner (German: Zimmermeister), Michael Engelhard, living at Nr.57. The building was designed for renting.

The elevation is essentially remarkable by the impressive decorated balconies with Neo-Baroque accents: balustrades, heavy corbels, pilasters around the openings and a highly ornamented grand lintel on the second floor. The building was refurbished in 2017.

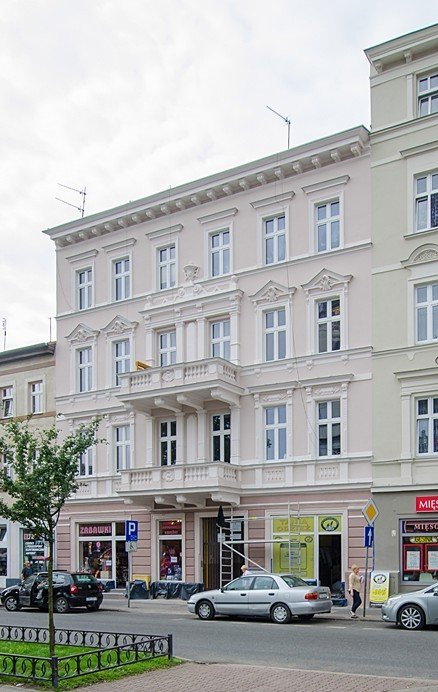
Main elevation from the street

=== Church of the Sacred Heart of Jesus ===
1913

Neo-Baroque

This church is considered as one of the most beautiful historicism style churches built in Bydgoszcz at the turn of the 20th century.

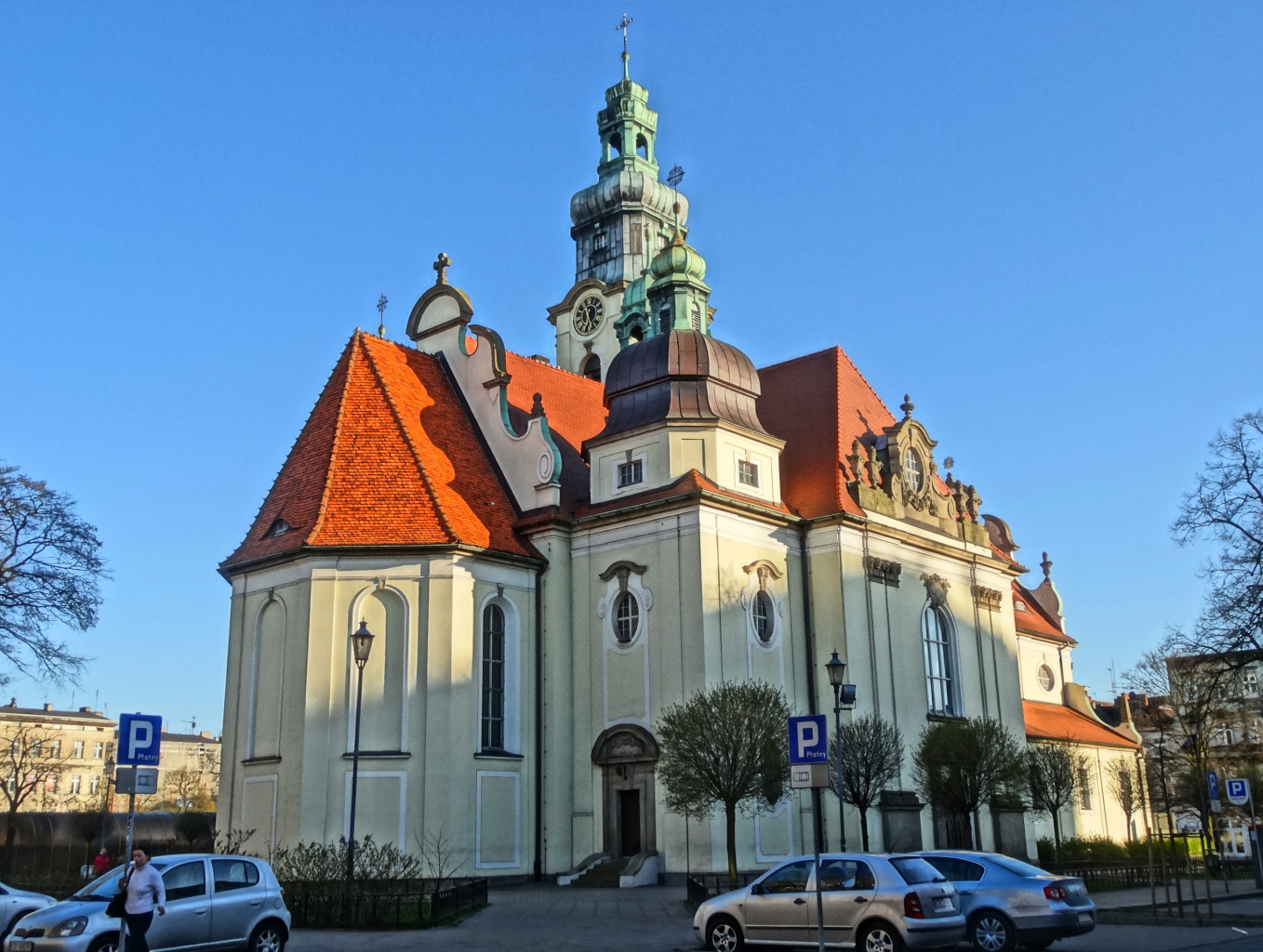
View from the street

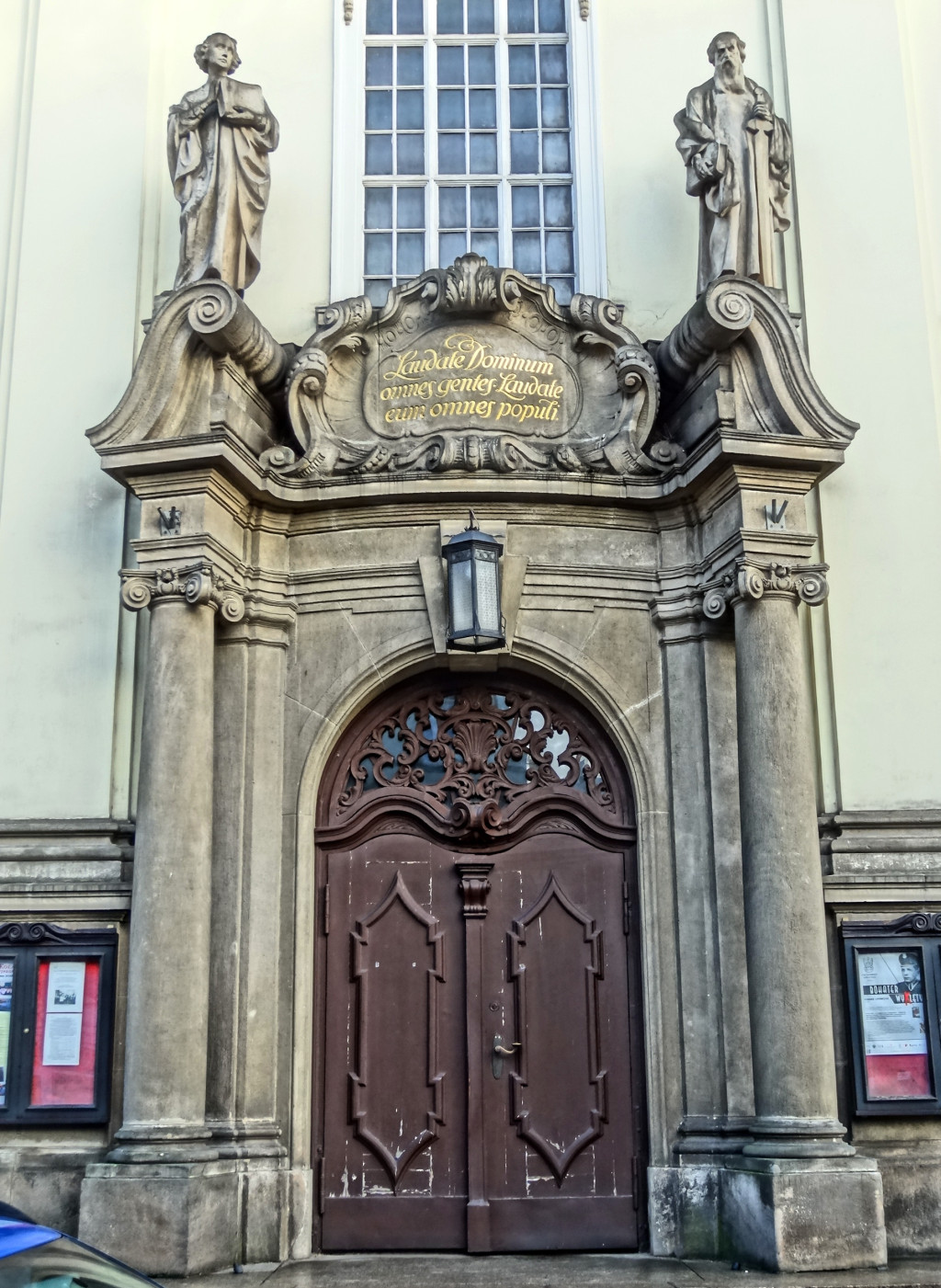
portal

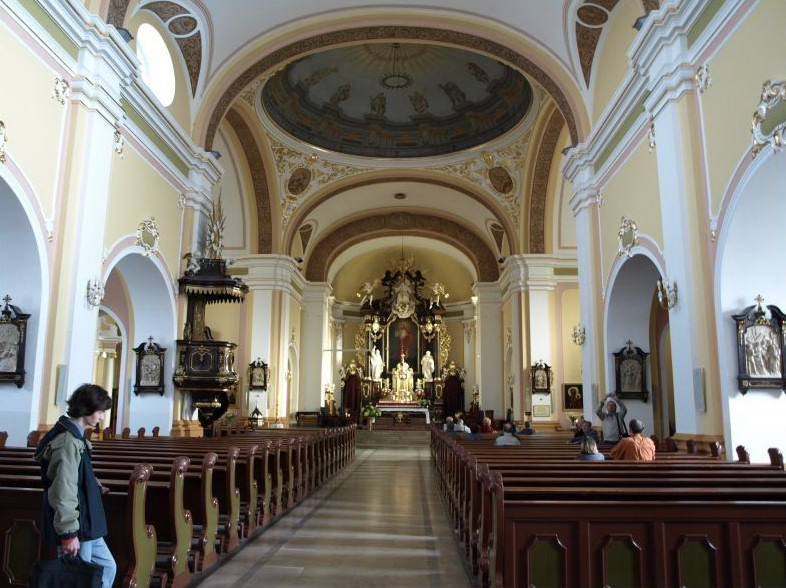
Interiors

=== Tenement at 55 ===
1898-1899

Eclecticism, elements of Neo-Baroque

Originally at Elisabethstraße 28, it was owned by Friedrich Gerth, a tailor: at that time, he lived at Nr.53. The building has been home place of Szczepan Jankowski, a Polish blind composer, organist and conductor of the Church of the Sacred Heart of Jesus. A memorial plaque has been unveiled on November 8, 2010.

Compared to Nr.53, Nr.55 is even more remarkable by its Neo-Baroque balconies complex. Both balconies flank a large bay window adorned with bossage and pilasters. Railings are adorned with wavy circle shapes placed like rosettes.

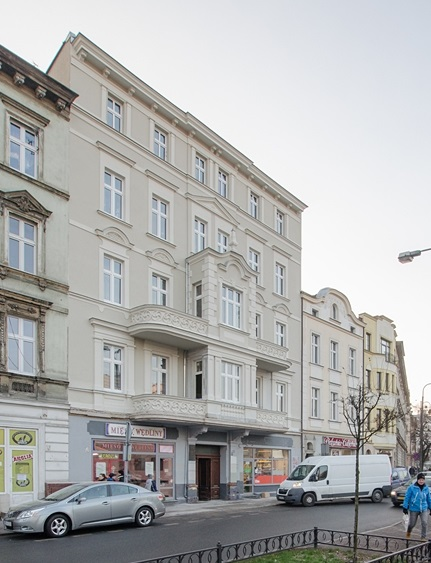
Main frontage after renovation

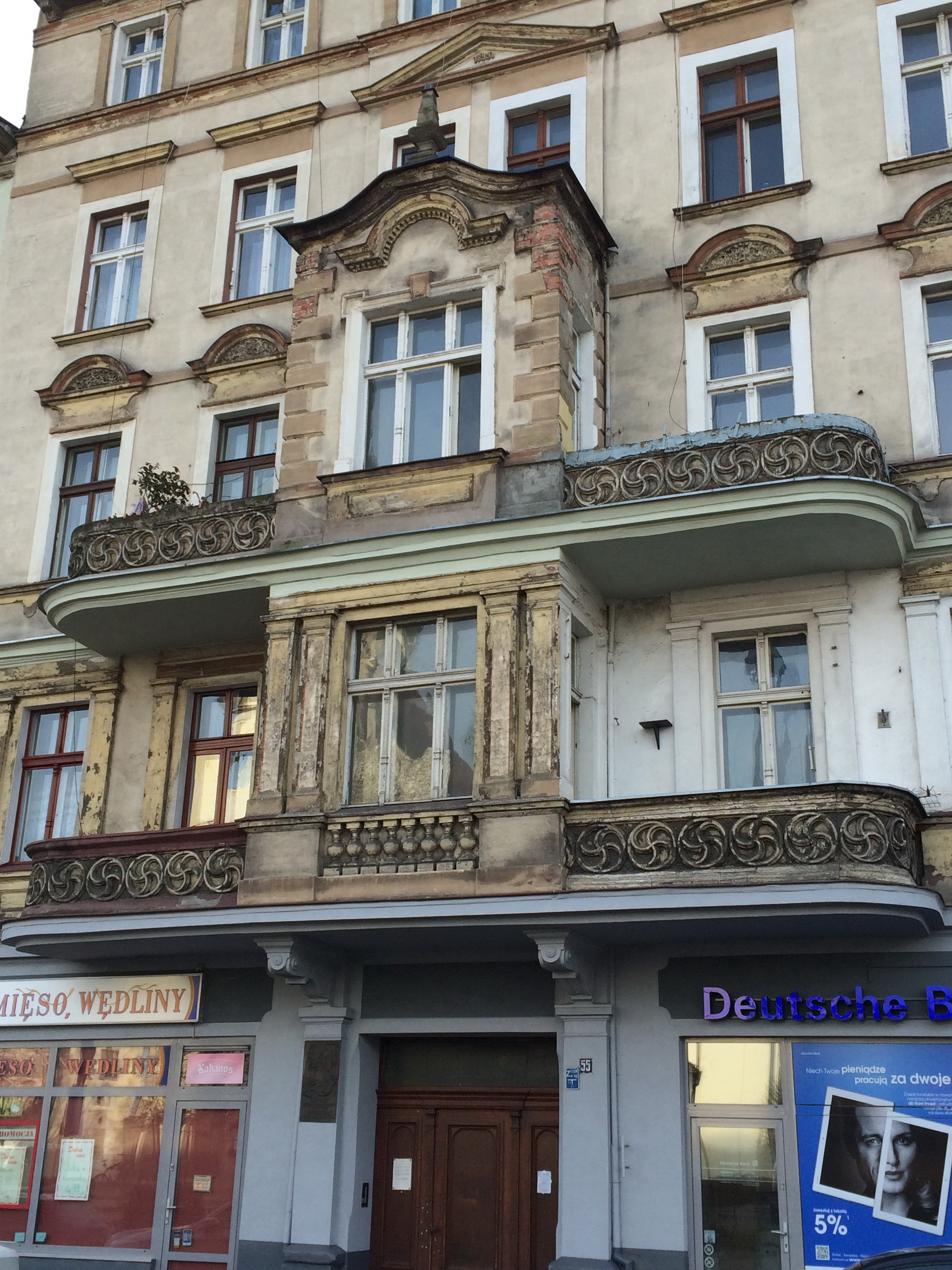
Balconies

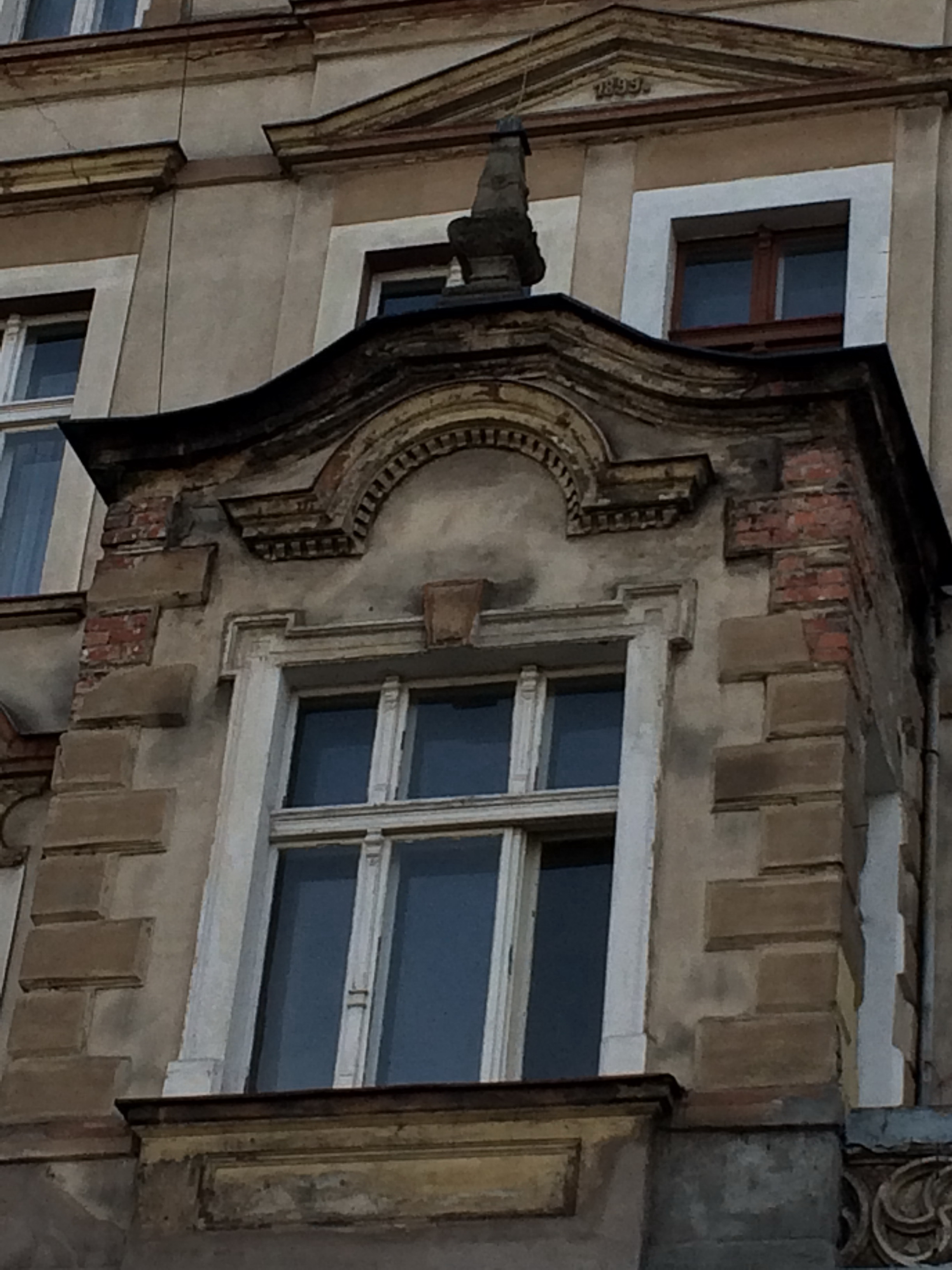
Close up view on balcony

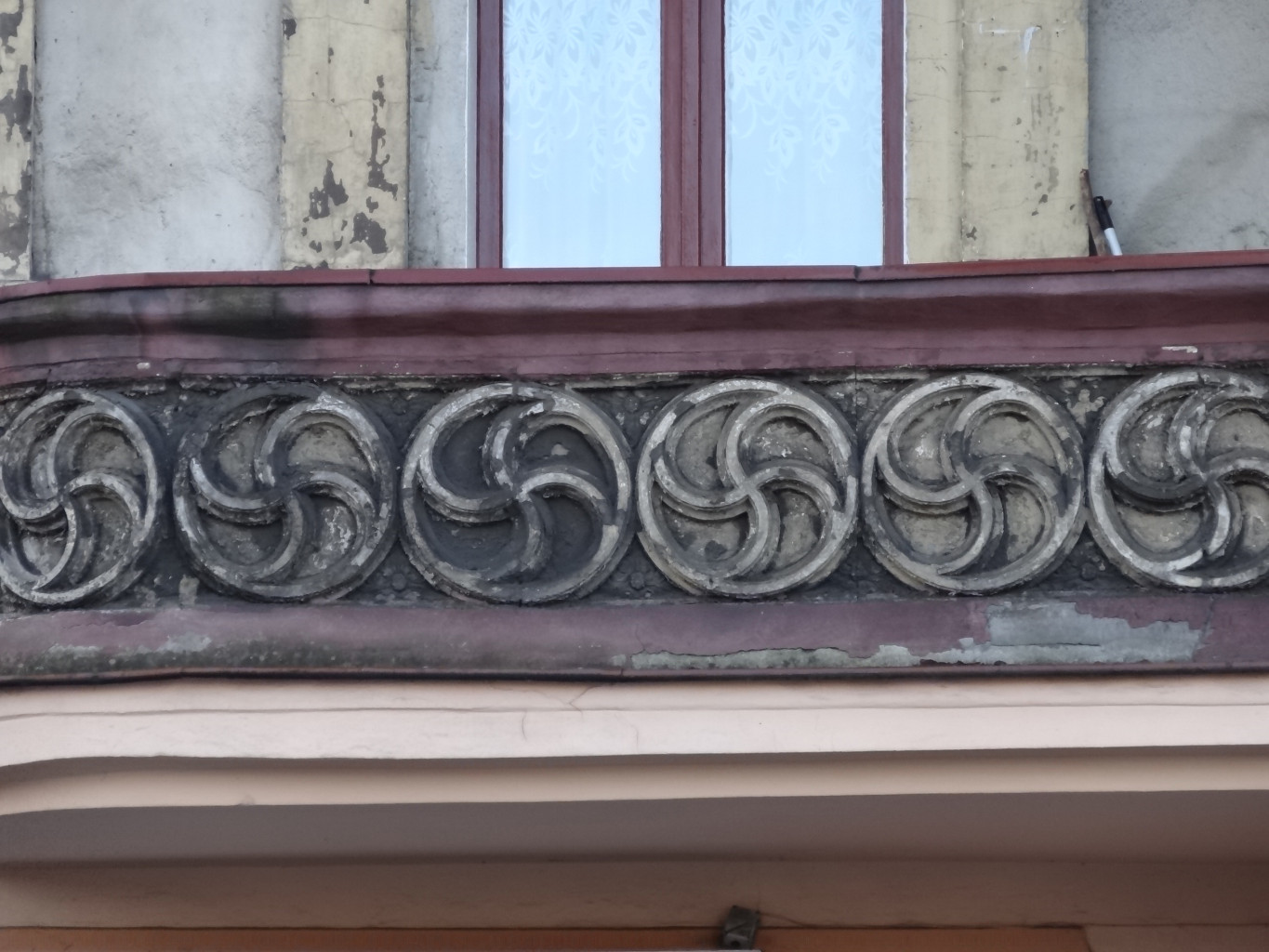
Rosette detail

=== Tenements at 57 ===
Late 1870s, 1903

Left house: Eclecticism, Neo-Renaissance

Right house: Modern architecture

Original address was Elisabethstraße 29: it was owned by Carl Wilhelm Feyertag, a rentier, living at "Bahnhoffstraße 11" (now 27 Dworcowa Street): he also owned the house at 19 Piastkowski Square. Since 1956, the left tenement houses the family-run bakery "KP", established in 1922 by Franciszek Poćwiardowski. Today the ground floor of the right building houses 1956-established ice cream firm "Lodziarnia Żak".

Although from the 1870s, the left elevation has been rebuilt and presents early Art Nouveau elements like the vegetal ornaments on the wavy shaped gable. Right facade displays early modernist elements, expressed in the very shape of the elevation, with the round bay window topped by a balcony, and the multitude of narrow and thin openings.

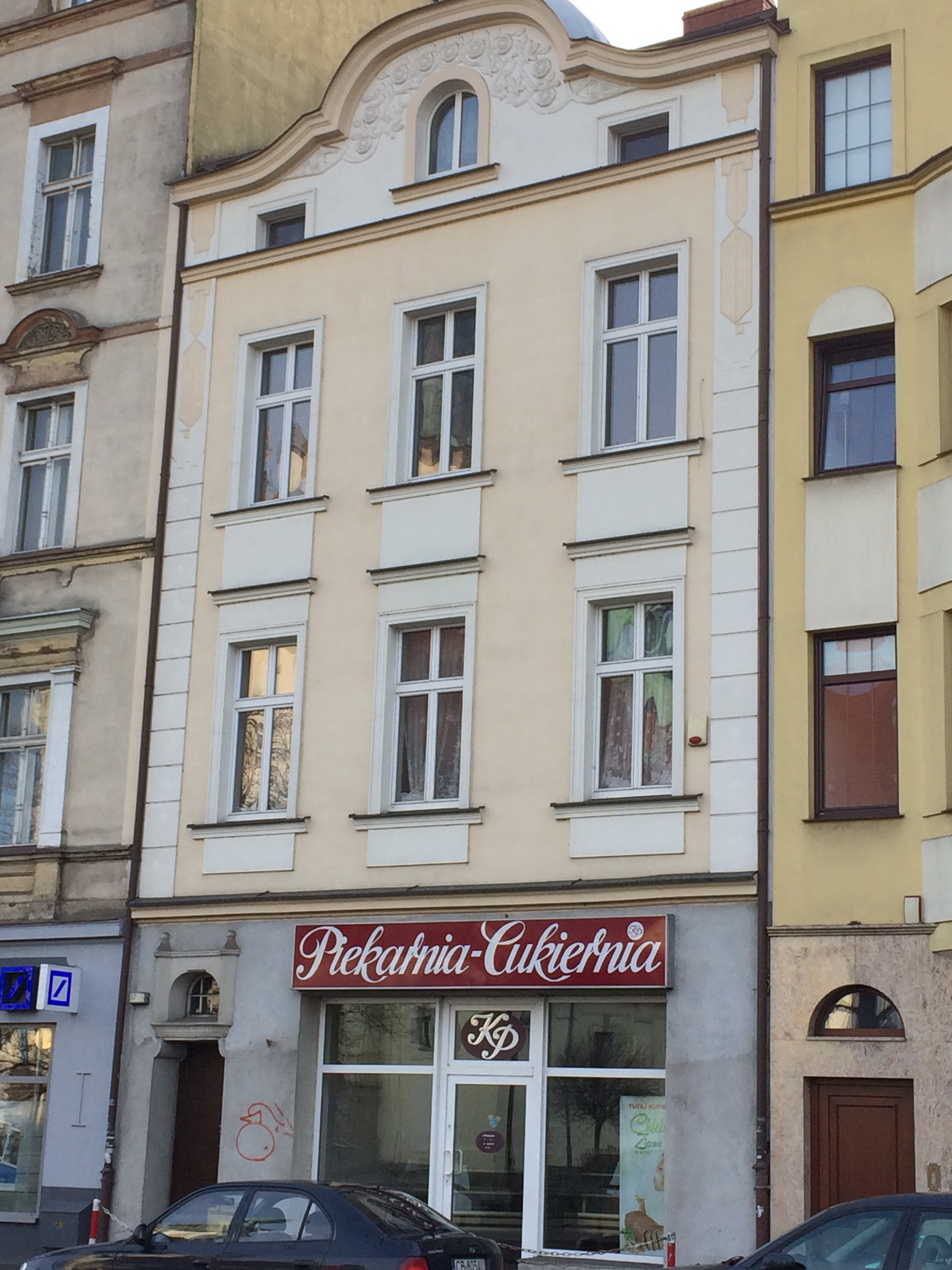
Left facade elevation

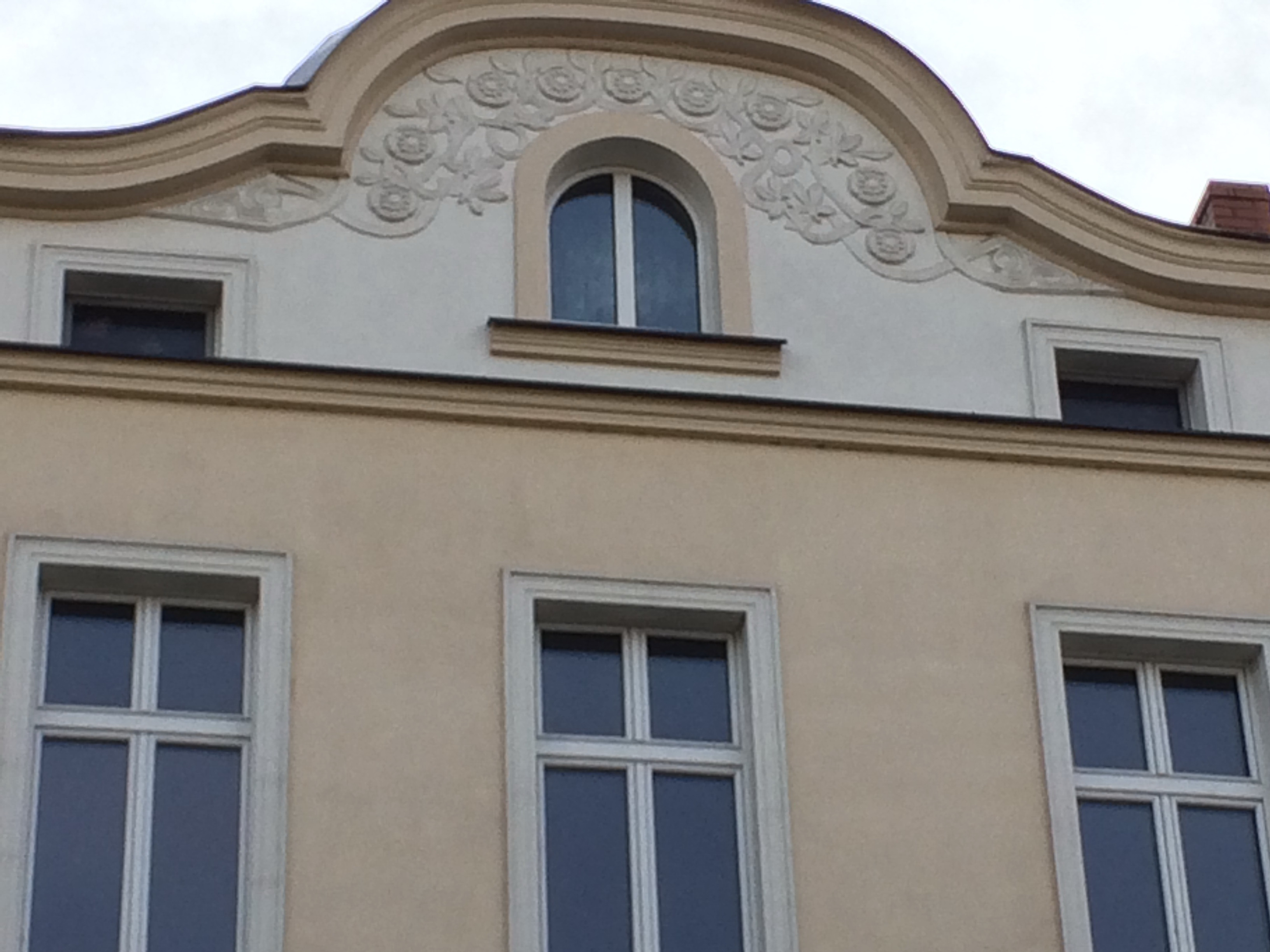
Detail of the gable

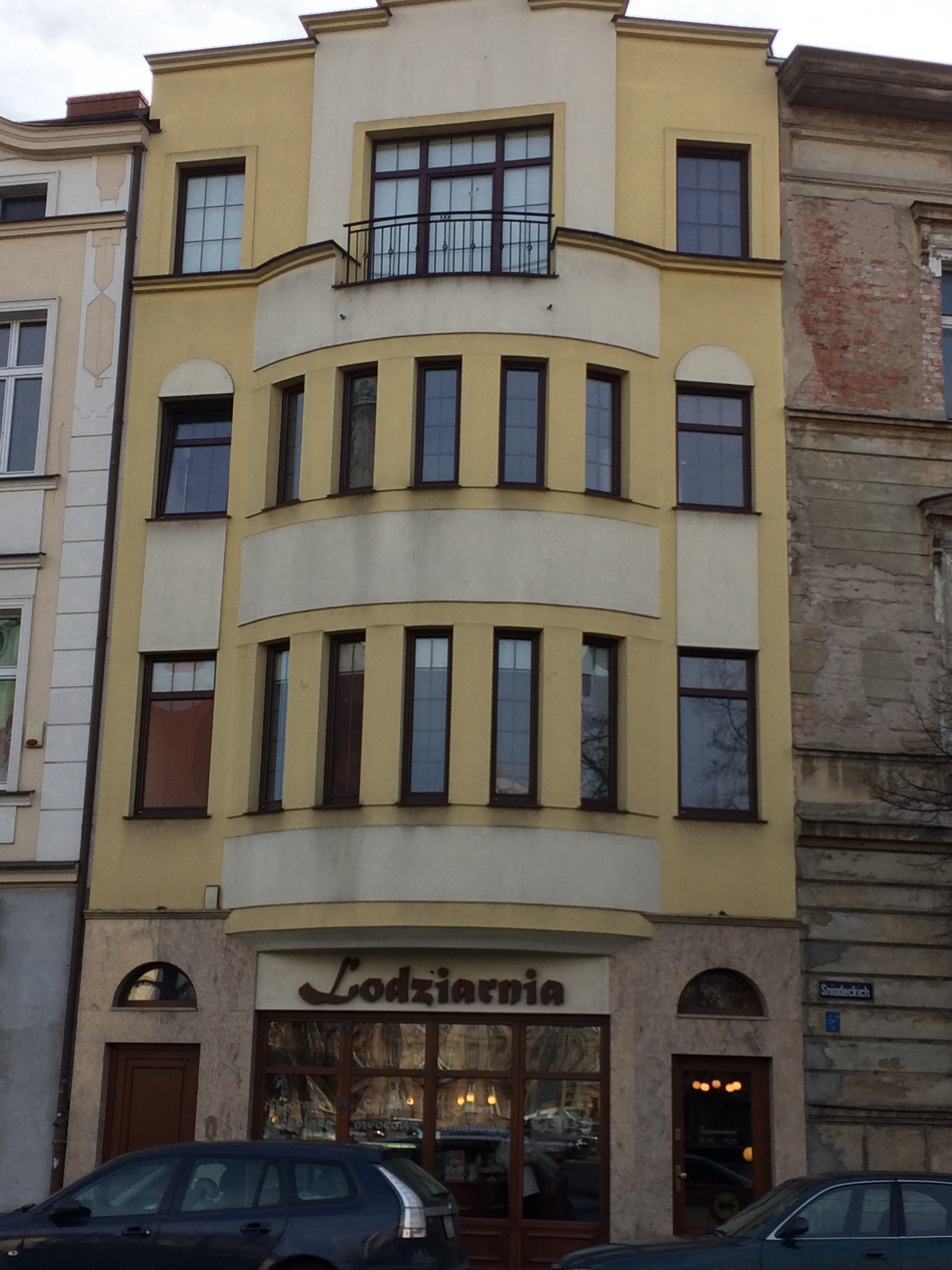
Right facade elevation

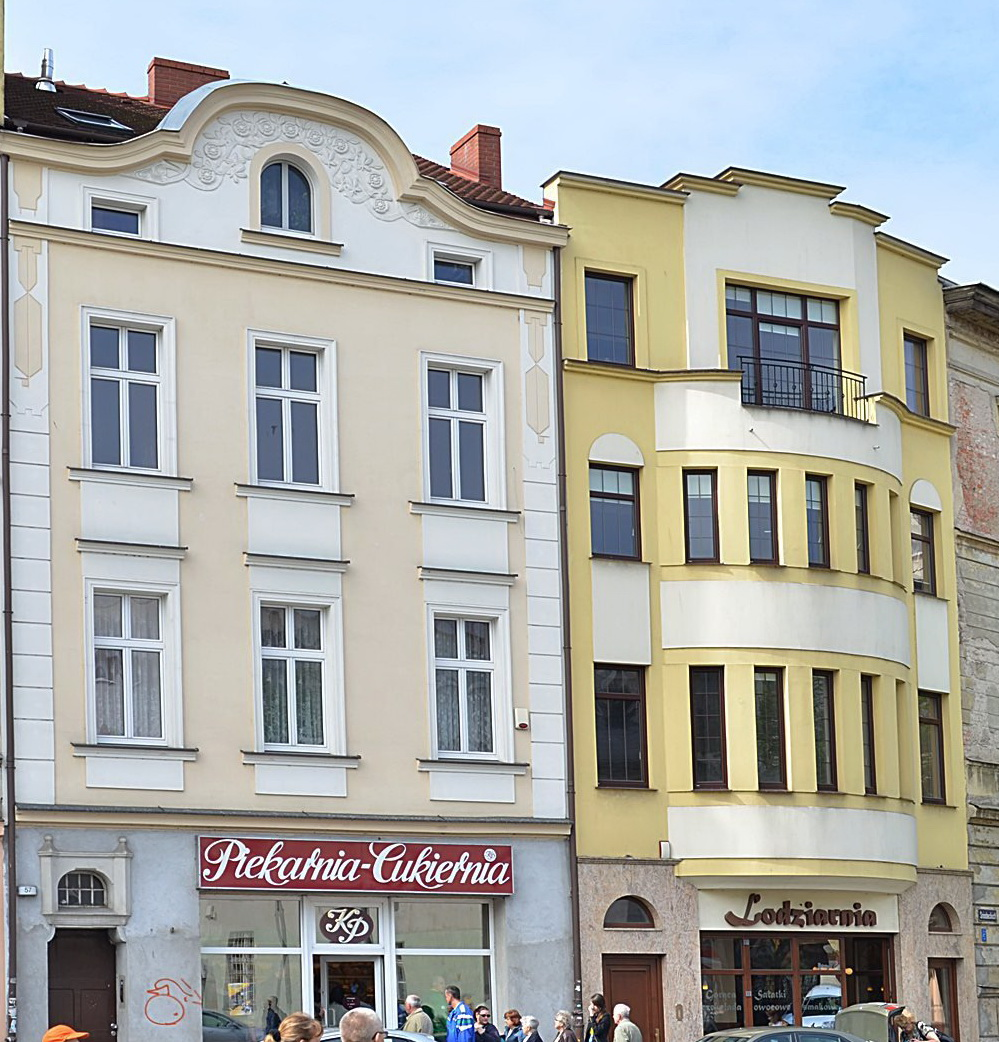
Both facades from the street

=== Tenement at 59 ===
1885-1886

Eclecticism

Original address was Elisabethstraße 30: August Mühlbrad is registered as its first landlord. The tenement was designed as a renting habitation house, having in average a dozen of tenants through the early 20th century. In 1910, it housed a seat of the German insurance company Nordstern (now merged with AXA).

The elevation shows typical Eclecticism-Neo-Renaissance features: adorned cartouches, window pediments and a little triangular tympanum on the gable.

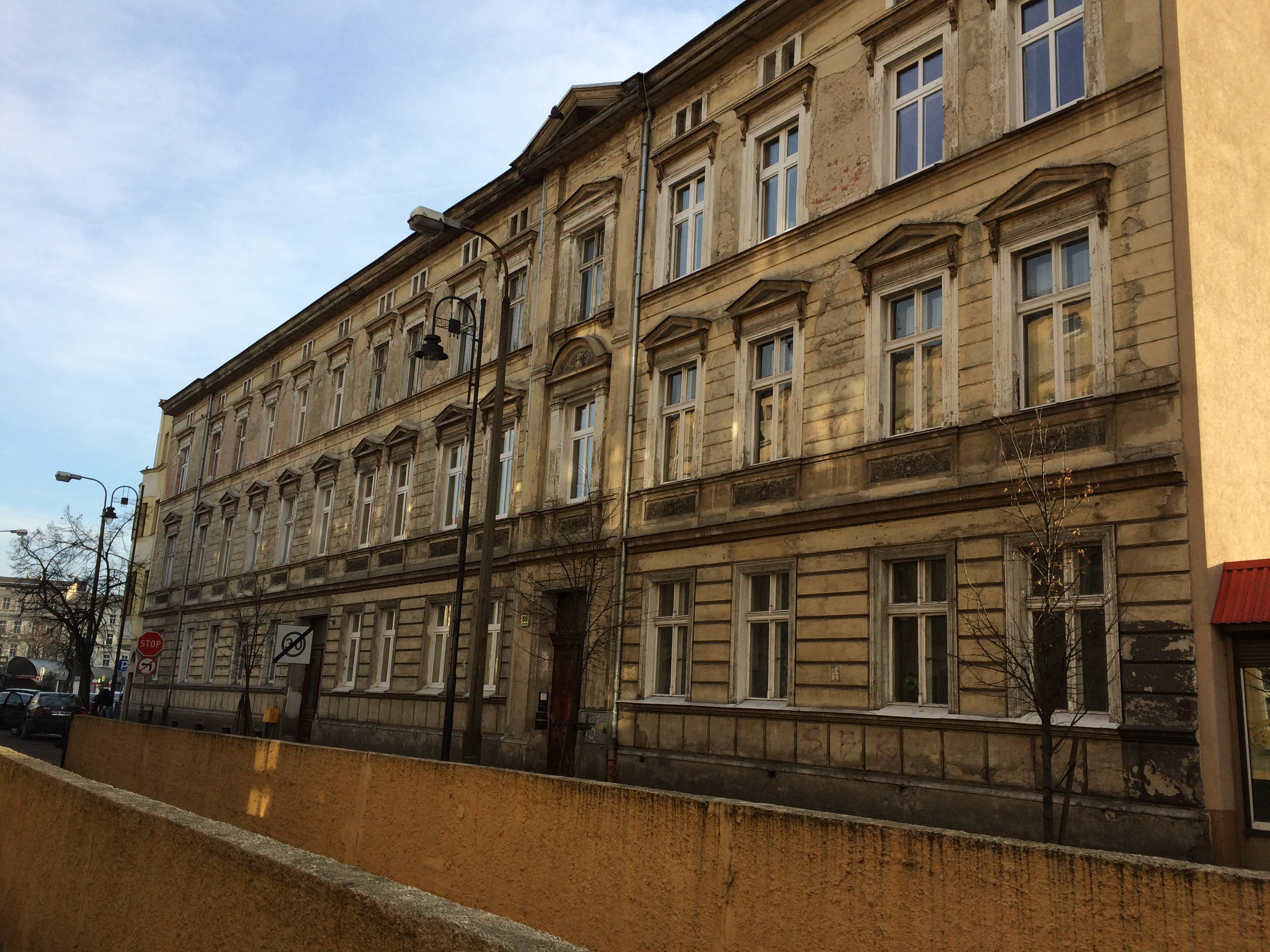
Main elevation

=== Hotel Brda ===
This building, though located in Dworcowa Street, closed Śniadecki Street axis by narrowing its northern tip. The hotel was opened on August 29, 1972. The site has always been a location for such activity, with previous "Heise's Hotel" (1889), "Hotel zur Neue Stadt" (1891) or "Hotel Nowe Miasto" (1920–1922).

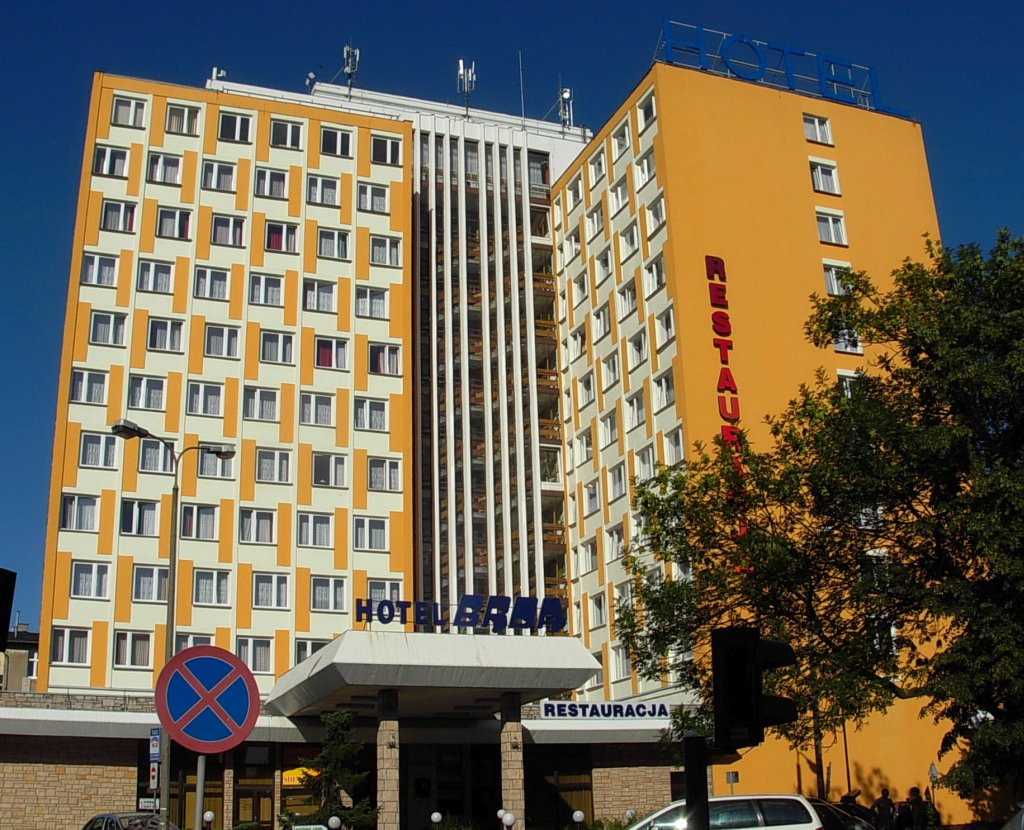
View from Dworcowa Street
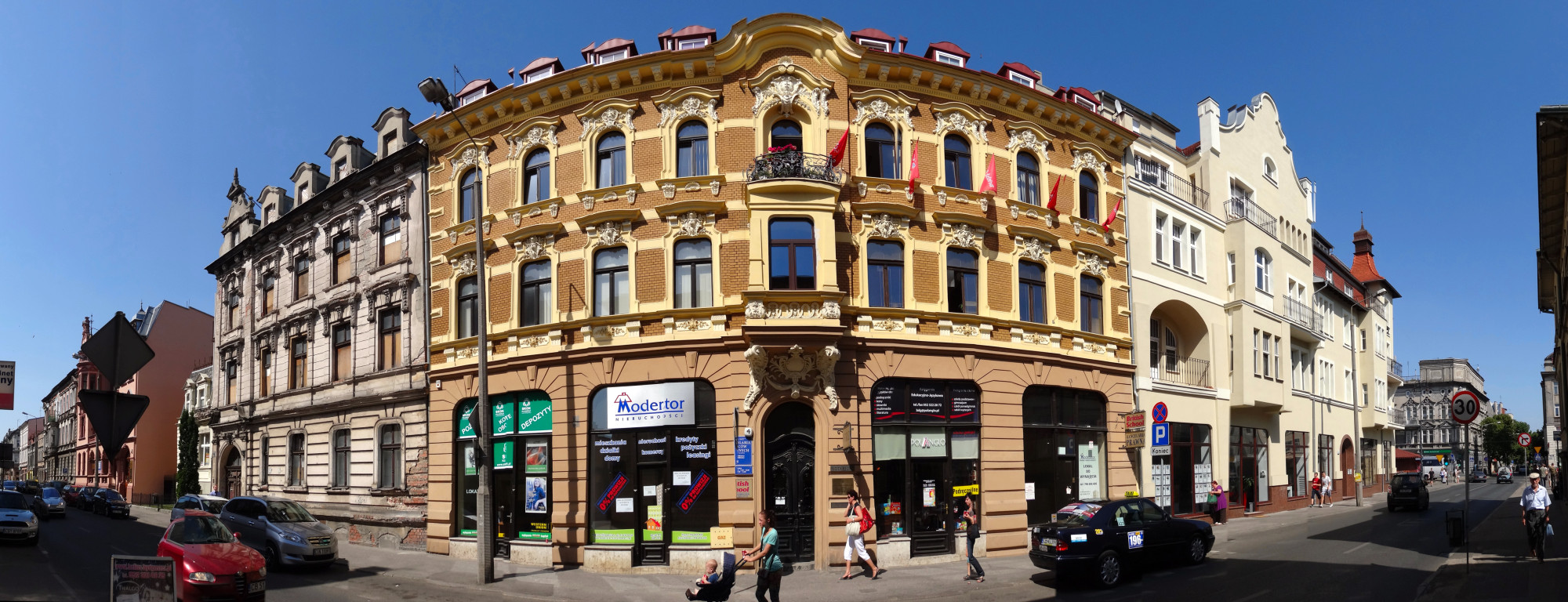
Panorama of frontages at Nr.2 (right), 4 (center) and 6 (left)

== Bibliography ==
- (in Polish) Przewodnik po Bydgoszczy. Bydgoszcz: Urząd Miasta Bydgoszczy. 2014.
- (in Polish) Jastrzębska-Puzowska, Iwona (1998). Poglądy artystyczne i twórczość bydgoskiego architekta Fritza Weidnera cz. I. Materiały do dziejów kultury i sztuki Bydgoszczy i regionu, z. 3. Bydgoszcz: Pracownia Dokumentacji i Popularyzacji Zabytków Wojewódzkiego Ośrodka Kultury w Bydgoszczy. pp. 44–55.
- (in Polish) Jastrzębska-Puzowska, Iwona (2000). Poglądy artystyczne i twórczość bydgoskiego architekta Fritza Weidnera cz. II. Materiały do dziejów kultury i sztuki Bydgoszczy i regionu, z. 5. Bydgoszcz: Pracownia Dokumentacji i Popularyzacji Zabytków Wojewódzkiego Ośrodka Kultury w Bydgoszczy. pp. 37–47.
