= Michał Łempicki =

Engineer, activist, Russia, Poland, 19th-20th century

Michał Antoni Łempicki
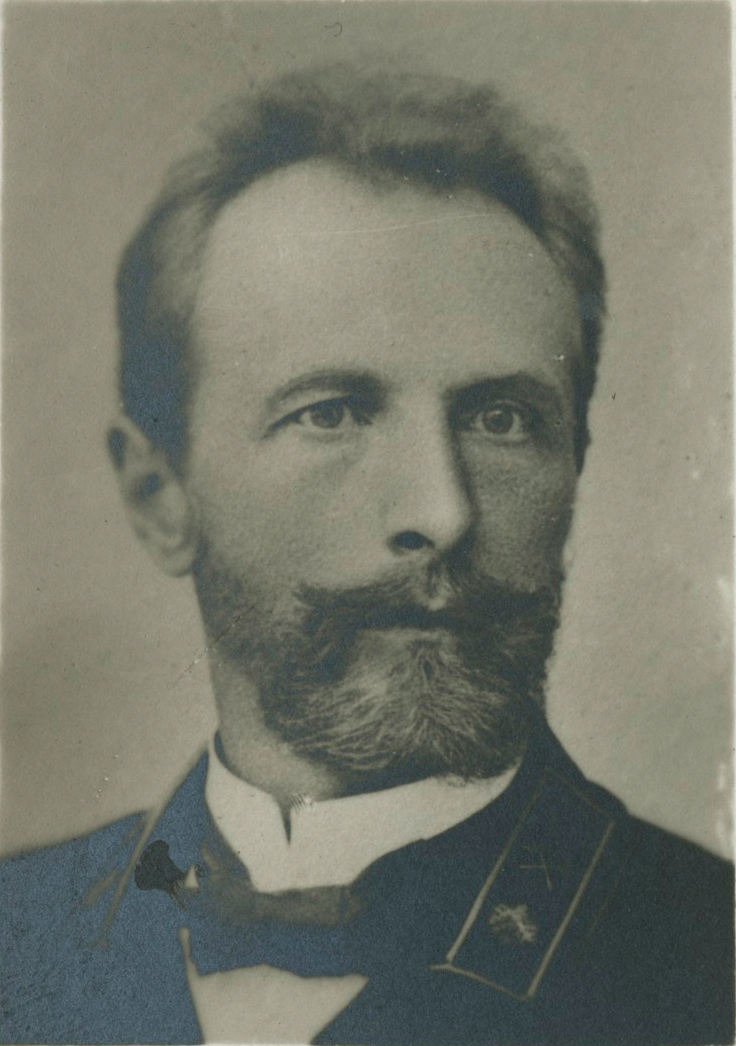
- Michał Łempicki ca 1906
- Born: 14 November 1856; Nowy Targ, Province of Prussia, Kingdom of Prussia
- Died: 29 December 1930 (aged 74); Bydgoszcz, Poland
- Resting place: Nowofarny Cemetery in Bydgoszcz
- Education: Mining engineer
- Awards: Order of Saint Anna, 3rd class Order of Saint Stanislaus, 3rd class

Michał Antoni Łempicki (Russian: Михаи́л Миха́йлович Лэмпи́цкий) (1856-1930) was a mining engineer and entrepreneur. He was a Polish public and political figure, deputy of the State Duma of the Russian Empire for the Piotrków Governorate.

== Life ==
=== Youth and studies (1856-1890) ===
Michał Łempicki was born on 14 September 1856 in Nowy Targ, Province of Prussia, Kingdom of Prussia (now in Pomeranian Voivodeship) His mother was Izabela, his father, Michał senior (1818-1895), was a nobleman from the province of Płock, then in the Congress Poland. In 1861, he was sentenced to exile to Samara. A year later, his wife Isabella was allowed to join him with their three children, Michał Antoni and his sisters. After a brief release to Saint Petersburg in 1871, the Samara exile resumed till 1886.

In 1874, the young Michał graduated from the Samara gymnasium and moved to Saint Petersburg. From 1874 to 1881, he studied at the St. Petersburg Mining Institute (Russian: Санкт-Петербургский горный институт): he was graduated both from the Institute Natural Sciences department and from the Physics-Mathematics Faculty of Saint Petersburg Imperial University.

From 1881 onwards, he served in the Mining Department as the head of the Polish mining factories transferred from Warsaw. In 1884, he conducted geological research in the provinces of Kharkiv, Yekaterinoslav and Kursk, with the civil servant rank of Titular advisor (Russian: Титулярный советник). The next year, he became the acting senior clerk of the Salt Division of the Mining Department. As such, Michał Łempicki carried out several works for the Russian Empire:

- studying salt lakes and other hydrological works in Western Siberia;
- analyzing Sloviansk mineral waters:
- performing geological researches in the Congress Poland; (e.g. developing a geological map of the Dąbrowa Basin).

=== Business manager (1890-1912) ===
In 1890, he joined the Polish Mining Plants section of the Mining Department: to this end, he left Saint Petersburg to live in the Dąbrowa Basin on Polish territory. In 1895, he became a member of the Main Mining Directorate (Russian: Главное Горное Управление - ГГУ), offering technical expertise to the mining company "Граф Ренард" ("Count Renard") in Sosnowica region; there he eventually took over the management of the society till 1901.

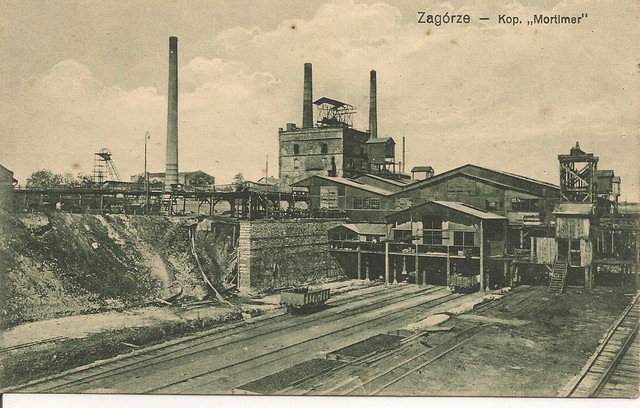
Kopalnia Mortimer Coal Mine in Sosnowiec ca 1920

In 1896, he founded the company M. Łempicki i Spółka Przedsiębiorstwo Górnicze, Wiertnicze i Hydrologiczne (English: M. Łempicki's Company of Mining, Drilling and Hydrology), based in Sosnowiec, Silesia: it operated not only in Silesia, but also in the territory of the Russian partition and in Siberia. The company is still active today under the name G-drilling- United Oilfield Services.

During the same period, Michał was an active member of various Polish industrial and scientific societies: hence in 1891 he entered the "Physiographic Commission of the Academy of Arts and Sciences", which founders originated from the Dąbrowa Basin.

From 1901 to 1906, he was the managing director of the Joint Stock Company of the Strahovitsky Mining Plants in the Radom Province. In 1906, Łempicki had gathered several positions in the mining business:

- director of the Society of Industrialists of the Provinces of the Congress Poland (till 1912);
- director of the Warsaw Society for Supervision of Steam Boilers;
- deputy chairman of the Society for the Promotion of Handicrafts in the Congress Poland.

Michał Łempicki published a number of papers related to mining exploitation. He retired in 1912 with the administrative civilian rank of State councilor.

Since 1900, he was the co-owner of a mining and drilling firm M. Łempicki and Co. in the Piotrków Governorate: it carried out large-scale drilling operations in Poland, Ukraine, Belarus and Lithuania, notably to build artesian wells. The company, which name changed over the years, had after 1905 many shareholders, in particular engineers from the Dąbrowa Basin (Józef Předpelsky, Anthony Olszewski, Stanislav Sventokhovsky, Edward Poplavsky). Local branches were established in Katowice, Warsaw and Vilnius.

Łempicki had also invested in several other business, including the Korwinów ceramic factory near Czestochowa or an agricultural machinery factory in Lublin. The amount of his assets is estimated at 500 000 Imperial rubles.

=== Political activities (1912-1930) ===
In November 1905, Michał took part in the Polish delegation appealing to the Prime Minister Sergei Witte. The goal of this petition was to ask for a reconsideration of the policy of the Russian government towards the Kingdom of Poland. He was very active among the Polish community of Saint Petersburg, becoming in March 1906, the Secretary of the Polish Central Election Committee in the Russian capital. As a matter of fact, Łempicki was harassed by the Russian authorities. Indeed, in 1907, having failed to be elected to the Second State Duma, Michał was forced to emigrate to Switzerland then Germany. Back to Poland, he continued to administer his mining companies.

On 20 October 1912 he was elected to the fourth convocation of the State Duma, as representative of the Piotrków Governorate. He then joined the "Koło Polskie" (English: Polish wheel-Russian: Польское коло), a group of Polish deputies in the State Duma of the Russian Empire. At the Duma, he was a member of the budget commission, the trade and industry commission and the labor commission.

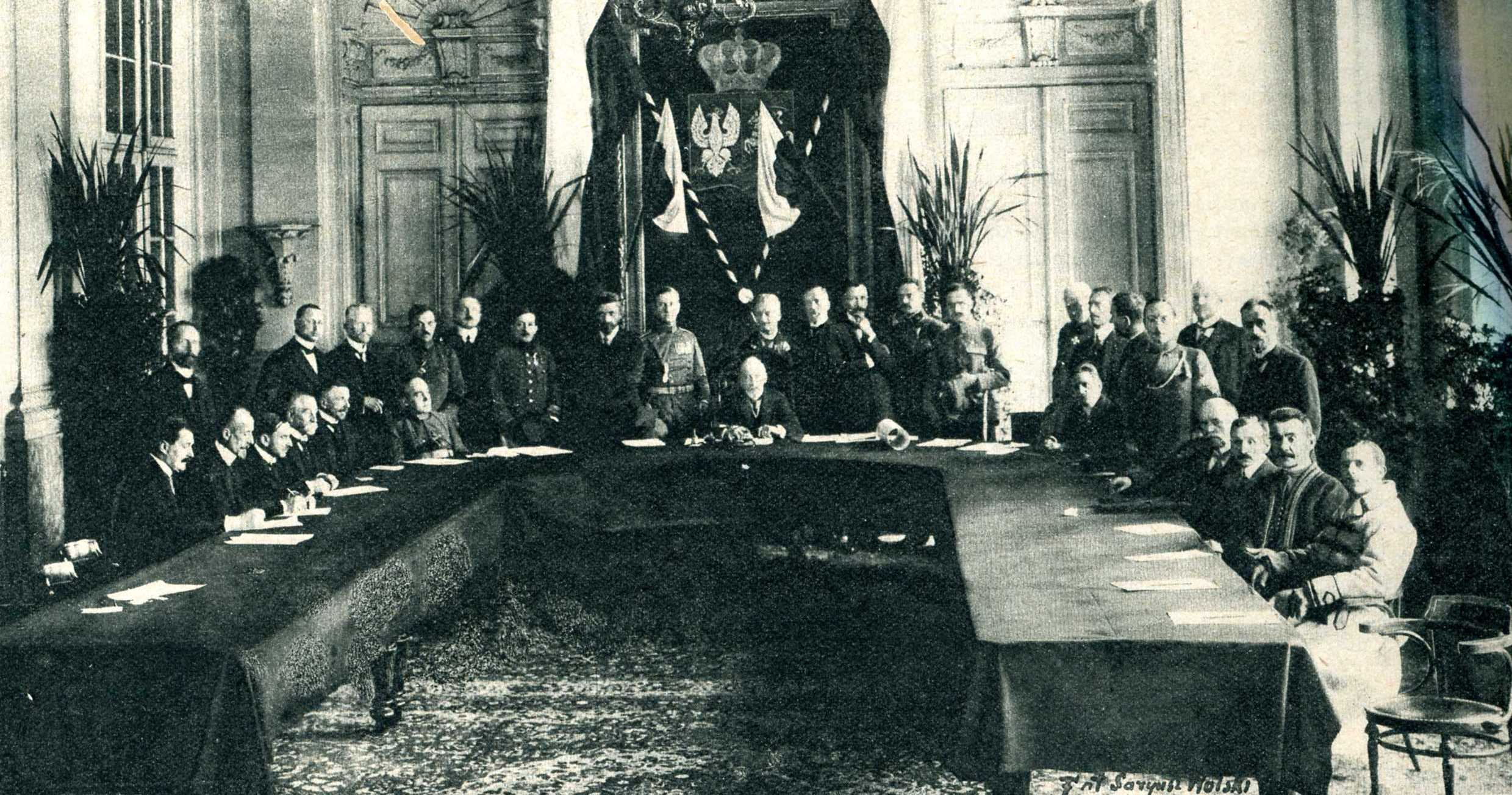
Provisional Council of State, 1917, Michał Łempicki is the second seating from the left

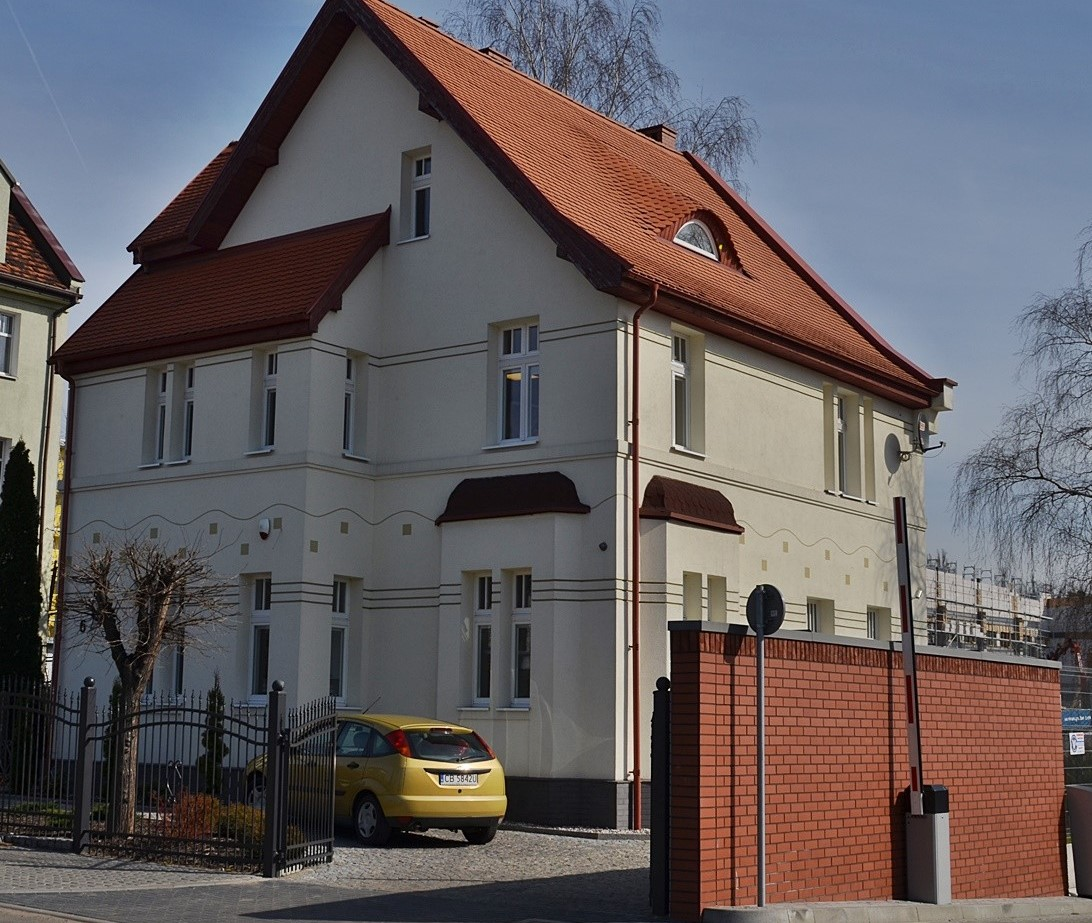
Łempicki Villa at 6 Chopina st., Bydgoszcz

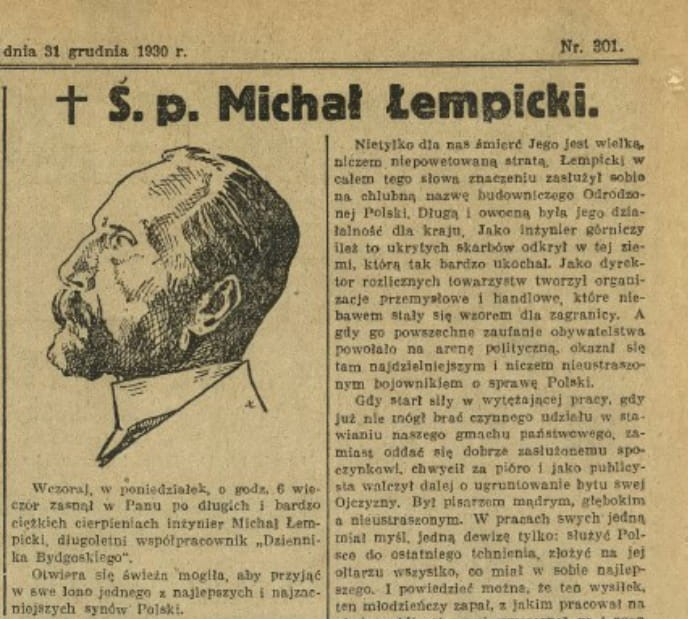
M Lempicki Obituary

On the eve of the First World War, Łempicki entered the occupied territory of Poland with an Austrian passport. According to Polish sources, he had renounced citizenship, even though he still signed his articles in the Western press as "Deputy of the Russian State Duma" (French: "député a la Douma d'Empire"). With the help of Austria-Hungary, he co-created a League of Polish Sovereignty and became its president.

His actions were utterly condemned by the Russian Duma: on 12 December 1915 he was expelled from the "Koło Polskie" for "anti-Russian activity". Following the occupation of the Congress Poland by German troops, Michał actively cooperated with the ruling administration: as a consequence, on 15 December 1916, he was deprived of his deputy mandate by a decree of the State Duma, officially for non-attendance at meetings.

From 1917 to 1919, Łempicki participated to the "Provisional Council of State" where he collaborated, inter alia, with Józef Piłsudski, Franciszek Radziwiłł or Władysław Studnicki: he chaired the Department of the Interior, which was responsible for matters related to the organization of local administration, health care and electoral law. Since 1917, he was also a member of the Military Commission established by the Provisional Council of State.

At the restoration of Poland's independence, he was appointed permanent consultant to the Ministry of Industry and Trade. In particular, he was engaged in the work organization in mines and metallurgical plants in Silesia and in the Dąbrowa Basin. He took part in the preparation of the draft law on mining and on the status of the State Geological Institute. Furthermore, he actively participated in the foundation of Polish military formations.

In 1921, Łempicki and his wife moved to Bydgoszcz, where they found here a large group of former inhabitants of the Eastern Borderlands. He knew the city after previous stays at a friend's flat at 23 Chrobrego Street. They lived in the newly built villa at 6 Chopina street. In Bydgoszcz, Michał kept contact with Warsaw institutions, where he liked to visit the Sejm and enter into political discussions with various ministries, having still many friends in this domain. Additionally, he often met with colleagues from the Society of Industrialists and was still a shareholder of many companies. He started to write articles for the daily local journal "Dziennik Bydgoski". In the 1920s, he was politically associated with the National Democratic movement.

Following the publication of own of his articles in the "Dziennik Bydgoski", "Sad Times - Sad Matters" (1924), Łempicki was accused by general Wiktor Thommee, then commander of the 15th Infantry Division, of insulting the army. After several weeks of trial which was followed with passion by the Bydgoszcz citizens, the District Court issued an acquittal on 6 December 1924.

In his villa, he had gathered a rich library, ornamented with many pictures (mainly portraits of children) by his deceased sister Leokadia Łempicka (1865–1913). He shared his passion of books with a good friend of his, Dr. Władysław Bełza.

Even before World War I, Łempicki started to cooperate with newspapers, like the Kurier Warszawski. He co-founded in 1903 the "Przegląd Górniczo-Hutniczy", a journal related to questions about mining and metallurgical industry. In Bydgoszcz, he pursued his writings (mainly political and social-oriented) for the "Dziennik Bydgoski".

He died on 29 December 1930, at the age of 74. His funeral took place on 1 January 1931: according to his will, there were neither speeches nor wreathes over the grave. Its coffin was placed in the "Missionary Fathers Church" in Ossoliński avenue. He was buried in the Nowofarny cemetery in Bydgoszcz.

Michał Łempicki bequeathed all his collections, about 800 volumes and the correspondence of his father Michał, to the city of Bydgoszcz. The donation comprised books, paintings, letters that his father once received from friends, autographs of Archbishop Zygmunt Feliński, poet Karol Baliński, historian Tadeusz Korzon, Mikhail Bakunin and writer Eliza Orzeszkowa.

== Charity and activism ==
In January 1928, on Łempicki's initiative, the "Łempicki Family Association" was established. It aimed at providing moral and material support, granting scholarships to young people in education and creating institutions of family and social benefit. Łempicki wanted also this institution to establish sheltering houses in Mazovia and in White and Red Ruthenia.

During their life, the couple made regular donations to the Kuchnia Kresowa, an association run by Poles from the Eastern Borderlands and providing food for people in the need. Likewise, they supported local orphanage, the Polish Red Cross or the charity actions conducted by the "Dziennik Bydgoski".

Michał Łempicki was one of the contributors to the construction in Bydgoszcz of the first monument to Henryk Sienkiewicz elevated in Poland. The original statue from 1927 and funded via a local committee composed led by Witold Bełza, was razed down in September 1939. The current monument was made by Horno-Popławski in 1968, is located on the very site of its predecessor, in today's Jan Kochanowski Park.

== Family ==
His wife was Józefa née Biedrzyńska (Russian: Йозефина урождённая Бичинская) from Korwin: they got married on 23 July 1889 in Kielce. She had an artistic penchant At her death, Józefina bequeathed the collections of 48 paintings by Leokadia, Michał's sister: they are now part of the collections of the Regional Museum in Bydgoszcz. The Łempicki family had no children.

His father Michał senior was sentenced two times by the tsarist regime, as an opposent to the Alexander II of Russia influenced by the anarchist theories of Mikhail Bakunin:

- He was exiled a first time to Iszy in Siberia in 1839, staying, among others, with Polish poets Karol Baliński and Gustaw Zieliński;
- The second time, he was transferred in 1861 from Saint Petersburg to Samara.

Michał Łempicki had several siblings:

- Maria, born in 1854;
- Kasylda, born in 1848;
- Leokadia (1865–1913 in Kyiv), a painter. In 1885, she came to Warsaw to study privately in the atelier of Wojciech Gerson. She also studied at the Académie Julian in Paris. In 1897, she returned to Warsaw and started teaching drawing in private painting schools and then at the "Women's Artistic School". She took an active part in exhibitions, presenting her work in the "Society for the Encouragement of Fine Arts" in Warsaw and Krakow, as well as in galleries of Vilnius and Paris. Many of her works were unfortunately lost during the revolutionary turmoil or the Second World War.

== Awards ==
While living as a citizen of the Russian Empire, Michał Łempicki received two decorations:

- Order of Saint Anna, 3rd class;
- Order of Saint Stanislaus, 3rd class.

== See also ==
- Bydgoszcz
- Chopina Street, Bydgoszcz
- List of Polish people

== Bibliography ==
- (in Russian) Боиович, M. (1913). Члены Государственной думы : (портреты и биографии) : Четвертый созыв, 1912-1917 г. Москва: РГБ. p. 412.
- (in Russian) Ольшанский (1913). 4-й созыв Государственной думы : Худож. фототип. альбом с портр. и биогр. Санкт-Петербург: РГБ. p. 113.
- (in Polish) Brzoza, Czesław (2001). Posłowie polscy w parlamencie rosyjskim 1906-1917 : słownik biograficzny. Warszawa: Wydaw. Sejmowe : Kancelaria Sejmu. p. 113.
- (in Polish) Śmiałek, Małgorzata (2001). Sosnowieckie ABC. Wydawca:Muzeum w Sosnowcu. ISBN 9788389199379.
- (in Polish) Dziennik Bydgoski. R24 n 301. Bydgoszcz: Nakł. Drukarni Bydgoskiej. 1930.
- (in Polish) Chmielewska, Gizela (2019). Zanadto wyrazistyi sztandarowy. Michał Łempicki (1856-1930). Bydgoszcz: Towarzystwo Miłosnikow Miasta Bydgoszczy - Bydgoskie Towarzystwo Naukowe. pp. 161–188.
