= Bruno Sommerfeld piano factory =

Defunct piano company, Bydgoszcz, Poland, 20th

Coordinates: 53°07′17.6″N 18°01′43.3″E

Bruno Sommerfeld's piano factory
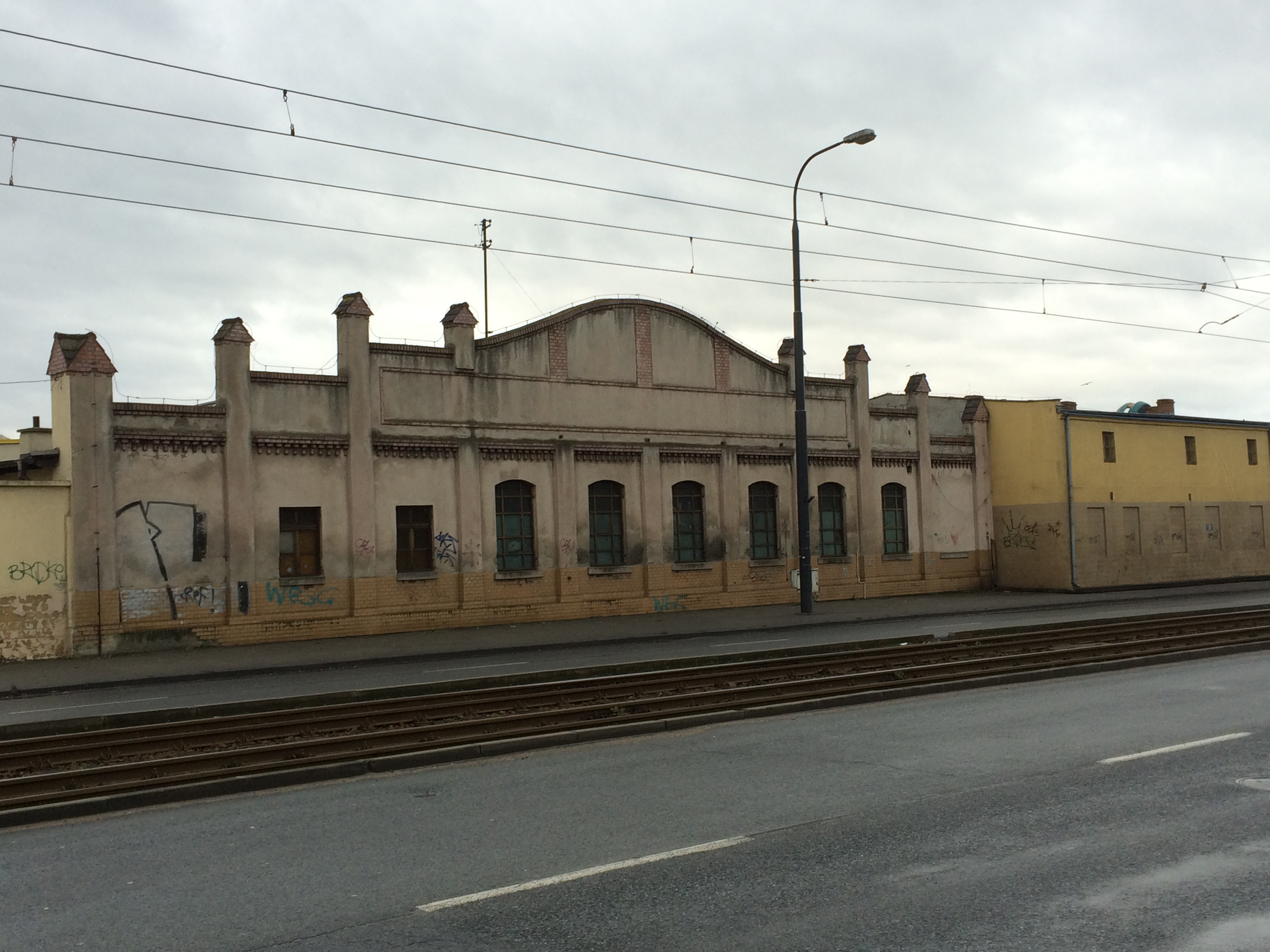
- Sommerfeld's ancient workshop in Bydgoszcz
- Native name: Fabryka Pianin i Fortepianów Brunona Sommerfelda
- Company type: Private company
- Industry: Musical instruments
- Founded: 1905, in Bydgoszcz, Poland
- Founder: Bruno Sommerfeld
- Defunct: 1945
- Fate: Bankrupt
- Headquarters: Bydgoszcz, Poland
- Area served: Poland
- Products: Pianos, grand pianos

The Bruno Sommerfeld Piano Factory (Polish: Fabryka Pianin i Fortepianów Brunona Sommerfelda) was a Polish piano manufacturing company that operated in the city of Bydgoszcz from 1905 to 1945. It was the largest piano factory in interwar Poland.

== History ==
=== Prussian period ===
Bruno Sommerfeld was born in Orneta on June 13, 1878, as the oldest of 9 children. His mother was Anna Barbara née Wagner (born 1854) and his father Joseph Sommerfeld (born October 27, 1845) was carpenter by trade.

In 1905, Sommerfeld established a small locksmith's shop which soon started repairing keyboards (German: Reparaturwerkstatt), under the name Pianoforte-Magazin at then 47a Elisabeth straße, today's 30 Śniadeckich street. In 1913, the piano workshop moved to 92 Jagiellońska Street and the showroom to 47a Elisabeth straße (2 Śniadeckich street).

Otto Sommerfeld, one of Bruno's younger brothers, died during World War I on March 7, 1915.

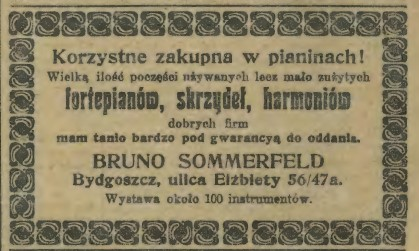
Advertising ca 1914

The factory produced grand and upright pianos as well as mouth organs. The firm was selling instruments, but also offered rental and repair services. Furthermore, it used to represent renowned German piano companies:

- Julius Blüthner;
- Feurich;
- August Förster;
- Karl Rönisch;
- Georg Schwechten;
- Wolfframm;
- Zimmermann;

and harmonica factories (Mannborg, Hofberg).

In the showroom, around 100 instruments were displayed; in addition to the above German brands, one could find pianos from Steinway & Sons based in New-York or Carl Bechstein in Berlin.

=== Interwar period ===
At the end of WWI, Sommerfeld took Polish citizenship, together with his wife Julianna Hazemann whom he married in Berlin. The couple decided to settle in Bydgoszcz. They had four children: one died at birth, Józef (1927–2011), Anna Maria (1929–1970) and Brunon Herbert Karl (born 1931).

During the interwar period, the company changed its name first to Sommerfeld Brothers (Polish: Bracia Sommerfeld) (1921–1922) associated with his brother Ernest, then to Bronisław Sommerfeld's Piano and harmoniums factory (Polish: Fabryka fortepianów i budowa organów kościelnych Bronisława Sommerfelda) in 1927.

It was at the time the largest piano factory in Poland, above the other domestic competitors such as Fabryka Fortepianów i Pianin „Calisia" from Kalisz.

In 1928, the plant employed 150 people and still 80 in 1937. In 1938, the firm opened a branche in Grudziądz and offices in Gdańsk, Katowice, Łódź, Poznań and Warsaw. From 1937, Grzegorz Kardaś, a famous Polish pianist and director of the Kuyavian-Pomeranian Radio Broadcasting Station, was the manager of the Warsaw office located at 83 Marszałkowska street.

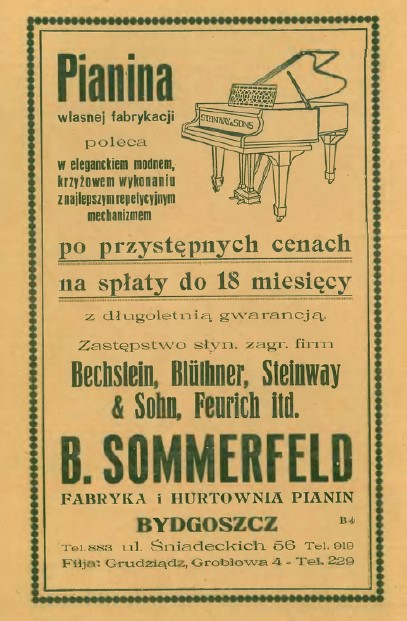
Advertising for Sommerfeld pianos ca 1927

Sommerfeld's factory regularly advertised its products in the press and participated in numerous exhibitions, where it had been rewarded:

- gold medal at the Pomeranian Exhibition in Bydgoszcz (1913 and 1927);
- Poznań (1928);
- silver medal at Vilnius exhibition (1928);
- gold medal at Katowice and Rogoźno fairs.

During the first Music Exhibition in Poland devoted to the music and radio industry (Warsaw-November 1932), the company presented in the main hall 15 models of upright pianos and grand pianos.

Recognition was also achieved in exhibitions abroad (Paris 1927, Florence 1929). In addition, Sommerfeld's pianos were promoted when rented for concerts or while played by the company's jazz band. The instruments were appreciated by famous musical figures, like Arthur Rubinstein, or Polish composer Feliks Nowowiejski, who visited the manufacture premises on March 18, 1930.

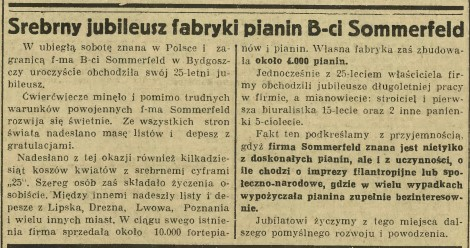
25th anniversary Sommerfeld firm, article issued 18 June 1930

From 1935, the firm exported its pianos to England, the Netherlands, France, Argentina, Palestine and Ceylon. At the end of the 1920s, 200 people had been working on the factory.

In 1938, the business was changed to Bruno Sommerfeld Spółka z o.o. – piano and upright piano factory (Polish: Brunon Sommerfeld Spółka z o.o. – fabryka fortepianów i pianin), based in Bydgoszcz. 75% of the share capital was held by the Poznański Bank dla Handlu i Przemysłu S.A and the rest by Bruno Sommerfeld himself.

During the entire interwar period, including the Great Depression, the factory produced a yearly average of 1,500 instruments till September 1939.

Sommerfeld was known to be very strict with the control quality he performed regularly himself: he did not hesitate to destroy the instruments that did not meet sound standards.

=== Second World War and occupation ===
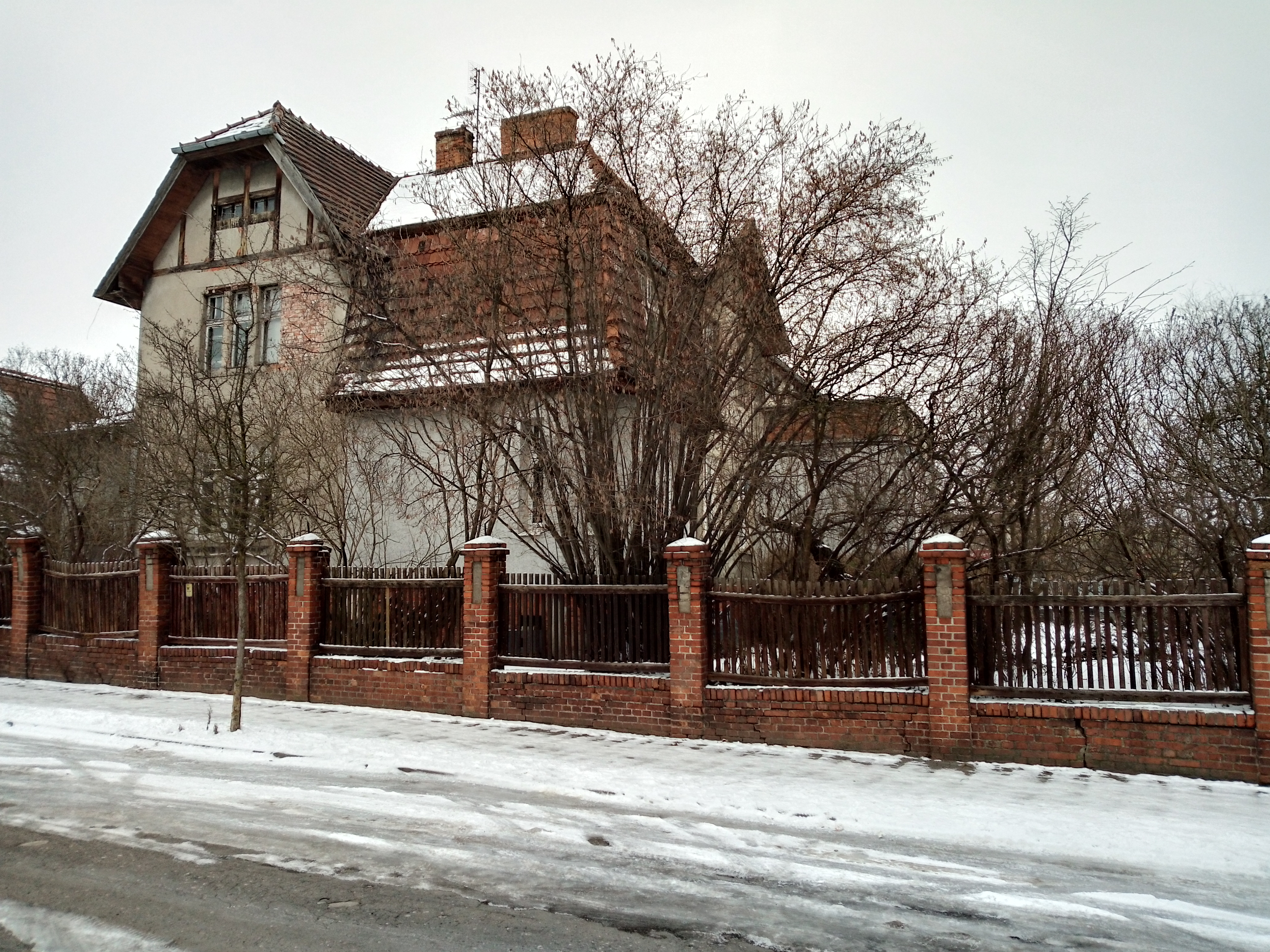
Villa Sommerfeld at 18 Chopina street

When Nazis forces occupied Bydgoszcz, the company was not expropriated because Bruno Sommerfeld could demonstrate German roots. At that time, he was living in a villa at 18 Chopina street.

In the first months, the company operated as Bruno Sommerfeld G.m.b.H. (as Sommerfeld was the sole owner of the firm from December 30, 1940) and under this name, it had branches in Bydgoszcz, Katowice, Łódź, Poznań and opened representative offices in Gdańsk, Kraków and Warsaw.

In 1942, in addition to the production of musical instruments, the factory manufactured as well office furniture, tables, wardrobes and beds. The employment dropped to 40 people, 90% of whom were Poles.

In late January 1945, during the fights for the liberation of the city, the factory equipment was completely burned down after artillery shells hit warehouses, causing a fire.

Prior to this event, Bruno Sommerfeld had left Bydgoszcz in the winter 1944–1945 with a wave of German refugees. He kept a correspondence with his former employees living in Bydgoszcz until his demise. Once in Berlin, the Sommerfeld family decided to emigrate to Canada, but Bruno stayed in Germany. He died in Berlin on June 5, 1960.

=== Post war years ===
In July 1945, the company was nationalized and its management moved to the hands of the Union of the Local Wood Industries (Polish: Zjednoczenie miejscowego przemysłu drzewnego). The union immediately stopped the piano production: as a consequence, both the ex-Sommerfeld factory and the showroom at Śniadeckich street closed.

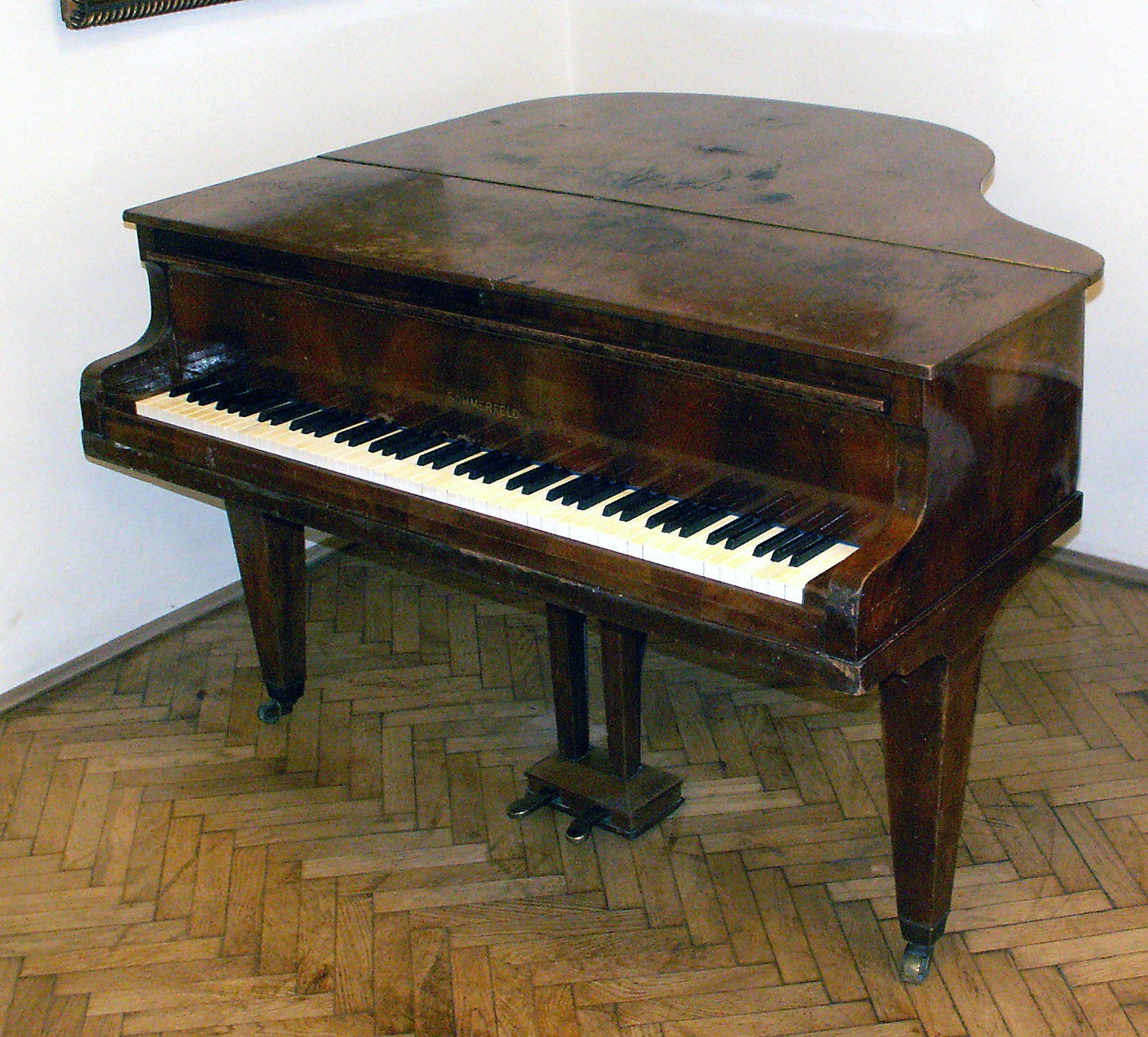
Sommerfeld piano exhibited

The only musical instruments manufacturing in Bydgoszcz that partially survived through the post war years was the Bydgoszcz Accordion Factory (Polish: Bydgoska Fabryka Akordeonów), established in 1949–1950, which ceased operating in 1972–1973.

During its existence, Sommerfeld company sold approximately 10,000 grand and upright pianos. The factory in Bydgoszcz built about 4,000 pianos.

Some of Bruno Sommerfeld's descendants now live in Canada, where his wife Julia died in 1970 (Calgary). Bruno's sister Klara Cecylia, had also moved there after WWII with her husband Theo.

== Exhibit near Bydgoszcz ==
Several pianos from Sommerfeld's factory are preserved in the Pomeranian Philharmonic collection exhibited in the Old Palace in Ostromecko, 15 km east of Bydgoszcz.

== See also ==
- Bydgoszcz
- Palaces and park ensemble in Ostromecko
- List of piano manufacturers
- Pomeranian Philharmonic
- Grzegorz Kardaś
