= Chopina Street, Bydgoszcz =

Street in Poland

Coordinates: 53°07′33″N 18°01′18″E

Chopina Street in Bydgoszcz
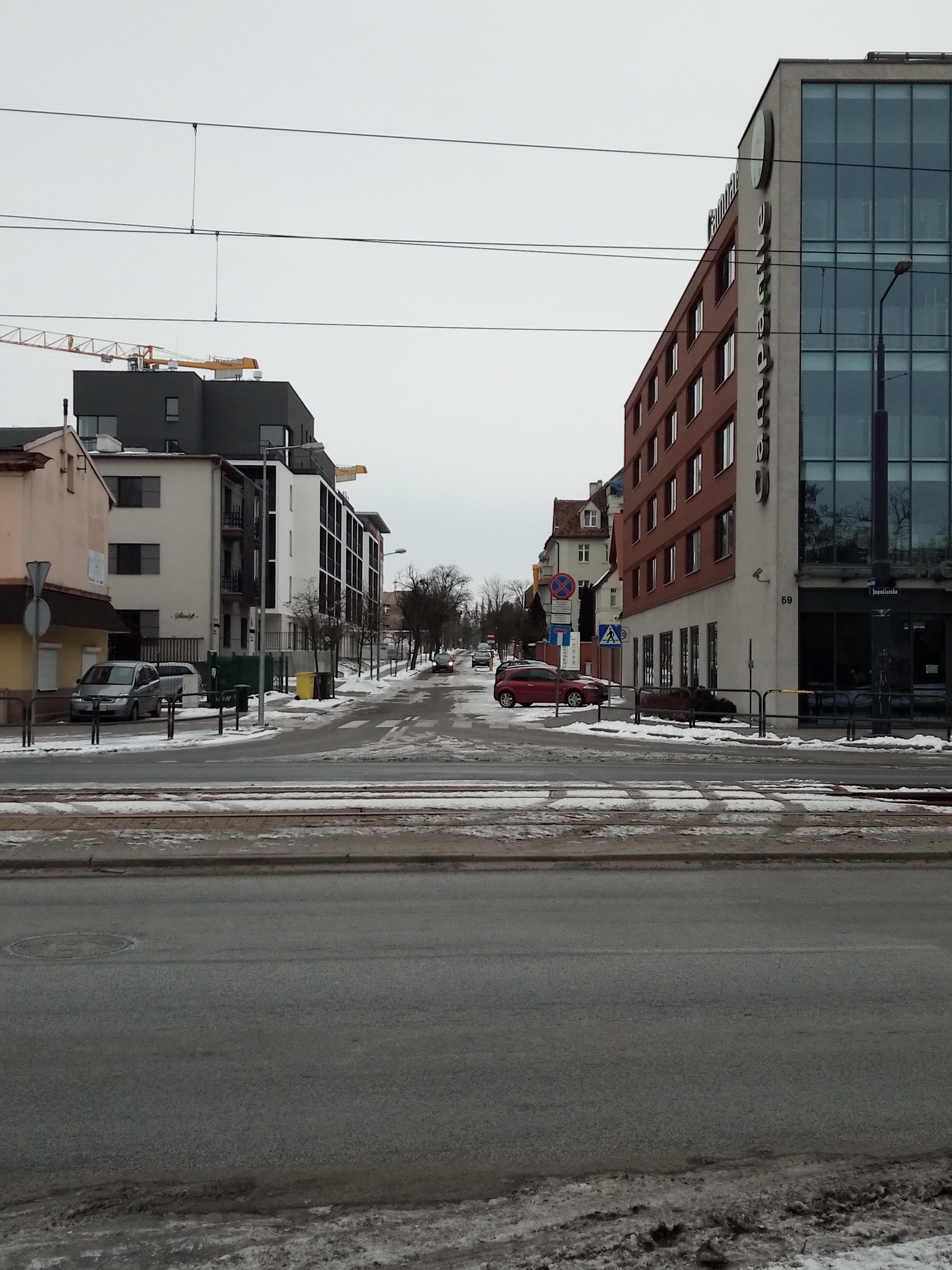
- View of the street to the north
- Interactive map of Chopina Street in Bydgoszcz
- Native name: Ulica Frederyka Chopina w Bydgoszczy (Polish)
- Former name: Zeppelin Straße
- Part of: Skrzetusko district
- Namesake: Frédéric Chopin
- Owner: City of Bydgoszcz
- Length: 500 m (1,600 ft)
- Width: ca. 10m
- Location: Bydgoszcz, Poland

Construction
- Construction start: Mid-1910s

Chopina Street is a thoroughfare close to the eastern part of Bydgoszcz downtown district. Along the path, one can notice many villas with distinctive architectural styles from the early of the 20th century. The street harboured two personages of the 1930s in Bydgoszcz, Michał Łempicki and Bruno Sommerfeld.

== Location ==
Chopina street is located on the east of downtown district, in Skrzetusko district. Along a roughly oriented south–north axis, it stems from Jagiellońska street and stretches up its half-kilometer length to the Polonia Bydgoszcz Stadium.

== History ==
The street has been laid in the mid-1910s, on a territory that was not yet part of Bromberg soil, which underwent repetitive extensions of its territory in 1920. Located in the eastern side of the city, the suburban municipality bore the name of Schröttersdorf (Polish: Szretery).

After the re-creation of Polish state following the end of WWI, Bydgoszcz city expanded its territory, hence incorporating Skrzetusko. In 1915, the axis only comprised four houses; the construction of additional edifices waited for 10 years (1926, 10 houses registered) before reaching, at the outset of WW II, the current number of plots we can notice today.

Chopina street bore the name of Zeppelin straße under the Prussian rule till 1920 and during the German occupation, in memory of the rigid airships created by count Ferdinand von Zeppelin (1838–1917).

The current naming relates to Frédéric Chopin (1810–1849), a famous Polish composer and virtuoso pianist of the Romantic era, who wrote piano solo pieces.

== Main areas and edifices ==
=== Łempicki Villa at 6 ===
1920

Late Art Nouveau

Michał Łempicki was born on September 14, 1856, near Sztum, Russian Empire (in today's Poland). His father, Michał senior, an opposent to the Alexander II of Russia was sentenced two times by the tsarist regime: the first time he was exiled to Iszy in Siberia, staying, among others, with Polish poets Karol Baliński and Gustaw Zieliński, the second period was spent in Samara, Russian Empire, on the Volga river. There, the young Michał grew up and graduated from junior high school, before going to Saint Petersburg. He gained his diploma of mining engineering at the Institute of Technology. In 1896, he founded the company M. Łempicki i Spółka Przedsiębiorstwo Górnicze, Wiertnicze i Hydrologiczne, based in Sosnowiec, Silesia: it operated not only in Silesia, but also in the territory of the Russian partition and in Siberia. The company is still active today under the name G-drilling/PRWIG. After Russia, Michał spent many years in Silesia as the director of the mines of the Renard Coal Society (Polish: Towarzystwo Węglowe Rebard), he was also the manager of the Towarzystwo Starachowickich Zakładów Górniczych SA. From 1912, he was an MP from the Piotrków Governorate at the 4th Duma (Russian parliament).

Furthermore, Łempicki joined between 1917 and 1919, the "Provisional Council of State" where he collaborated, inter alia, with Józef Piłsudski, Franciszek Radziwiłł or Władysław Studnicki: he chaired the Department of the Interior, which was responsible for matters related to the organization of local administration, health care and electoral law. At the outset of World War I, he moved to Stockholm: there, at the request of Henryk Sienkiewicz staying in Switzerland, he convinced the future saint Urszula Ledóchowska to organize in Scandinavia a fund collection for the "General Committee for Aid to War Victims" established by Sienkiewicz and Ignacy Jan Paderewski.

In 1921, Łempicki and his wife moved to Bydgoszcz, where they found here a large group of former inhabitants of the Eastern Borderlands. They lived in the newly built villa at 6 Chopina. In Bydgoszcz, he kept contact with Warsaw institutions, where he liked to visit the Sejm and enter into political discussions with various ministries, having still many friends in this domain. Additionally, he often met with colleagues from the Society of Industrialists and was also a shareholder of many companies. He started to write articles for the daily local journal "Dziennik Bydgoski"

In his villa, he had brought a rich library together with many pictures (mainly portraits of children) by his deceased sister Leokadia Łempicka (1865–1913), an artist who, at the turn of the 19th and 20th centuries, taught at the Women's Artistic School in Warsaw. The Łempicki family had no children. He shared his passion of books with a good friend of his, Dr. Władysław Bełza. Michał Łempicki died on December 29, 1930, at the age of 74. His funeral took place on January 1, 1931.

Michał Łempicki bequeathed all his collections, about 800 volumes and the correspondence of his father Michał, to the city of Bydgoszcz. The donation comprised books, paintings, letters that his father once received from friends, autographs of Archbishop Zygmunt Feliński, poet Karol Baliński, historian Tadeusz Korzon, Mikhail Bakunin and writer Eliza Orzeszkowa.

The broad villa, renovated in the late 2010s, boasts Art Nouveau elements: one can appreciate, inter alia, a nice eyelid dormer.

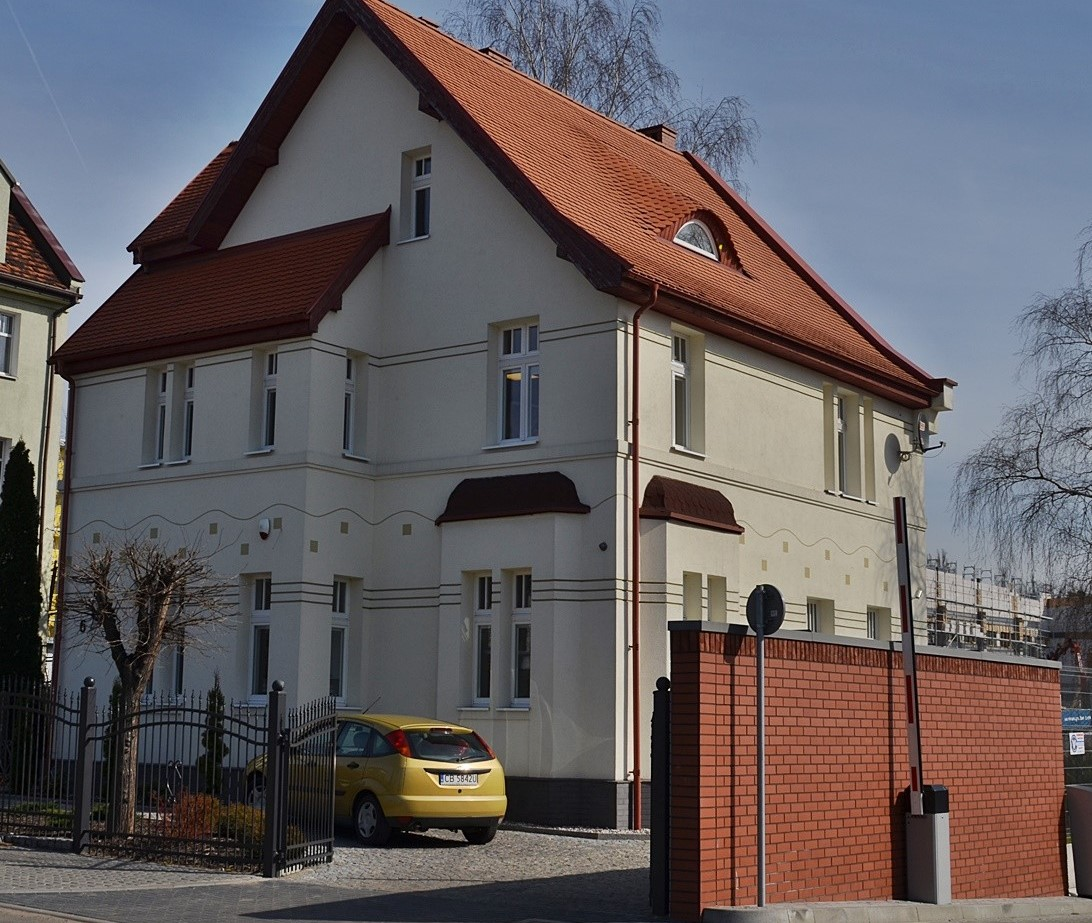
View from the street

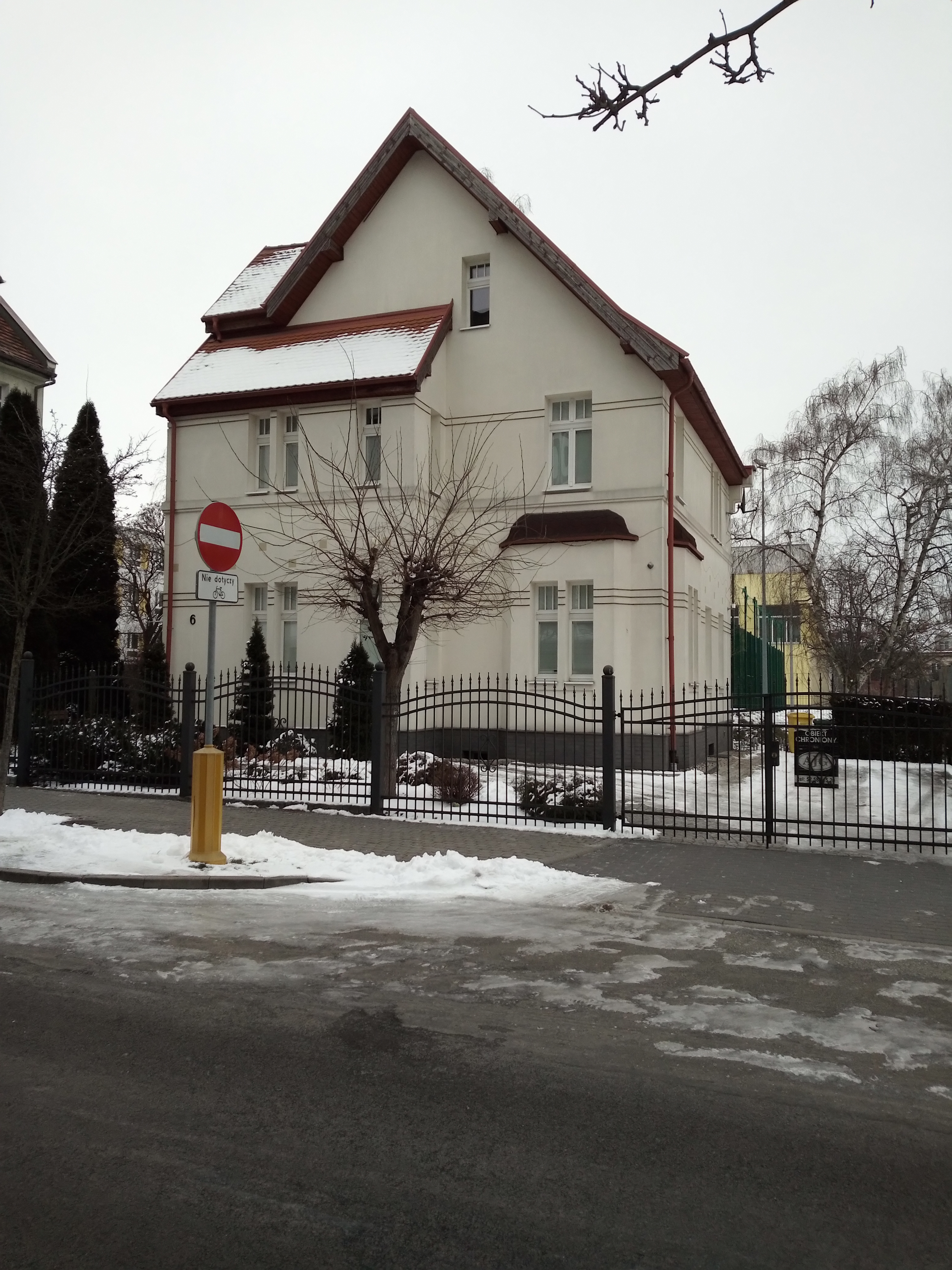
View from the street

=== Villa at 8 ===
1915

Early Modern architecture

This large edifice was one of the first to be erected on Zeppelin Straße 3. Its first owner is registered as Robert Kulmsee, an auditor. Before the end of the First World War (1917), the house was open for renting, under the name Villa Gricka. After the re-creation of the Polish state, the villa moved to the hands of the Gotard (or Gothard) family, who kept it until the start of WW II.

After a heavy fire broke out on September 19, 2020, and damage a major part of the edifice it has been under refurbishment in 2021. Its architectural style reflects the architectural characteristic of the 1910s, as far as early Modern architecture is concerned, as one can observe in some buildings of the city downtown (Otto Riedl Tenement in Bydgoszcz).

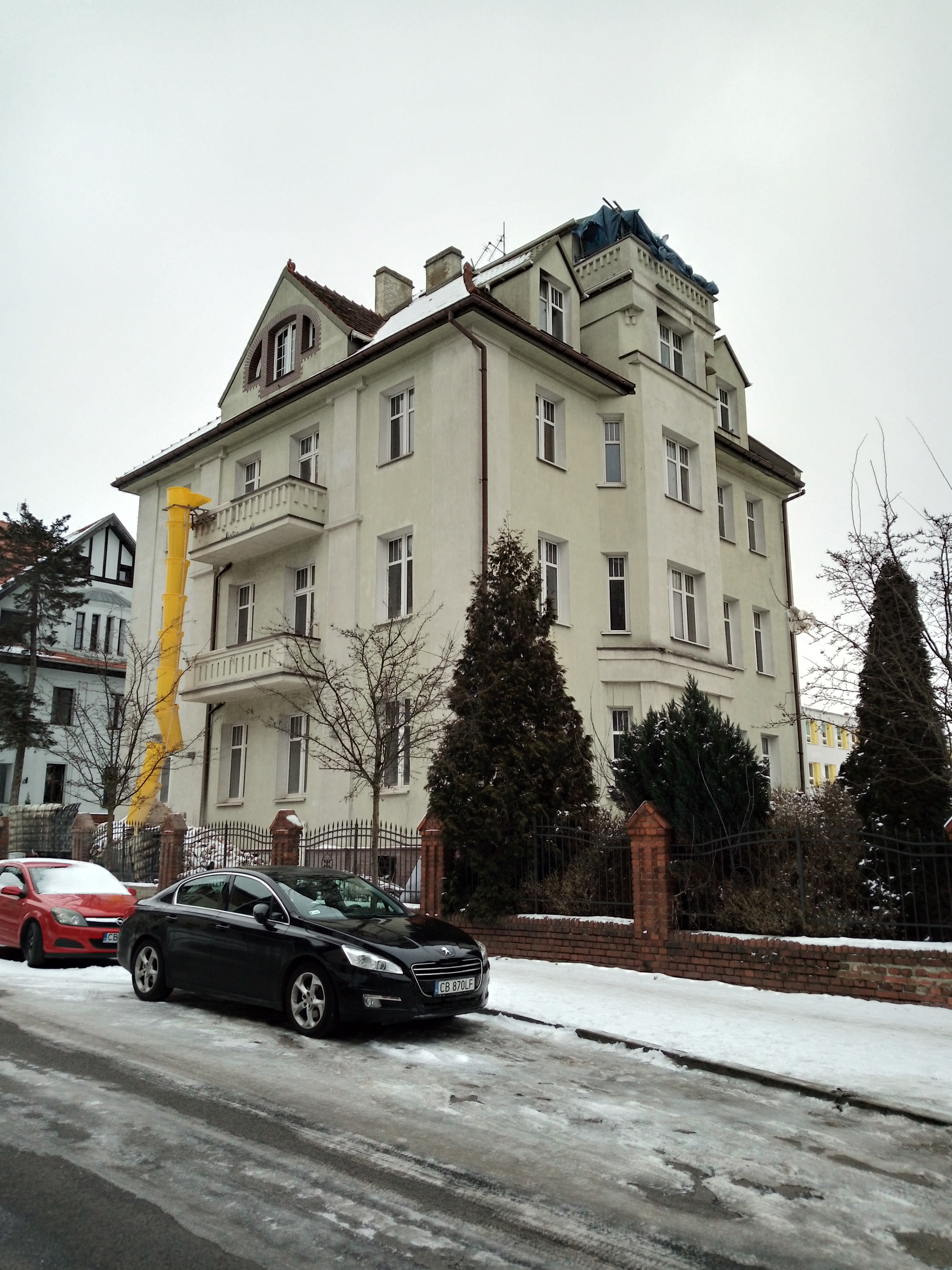
View from the street

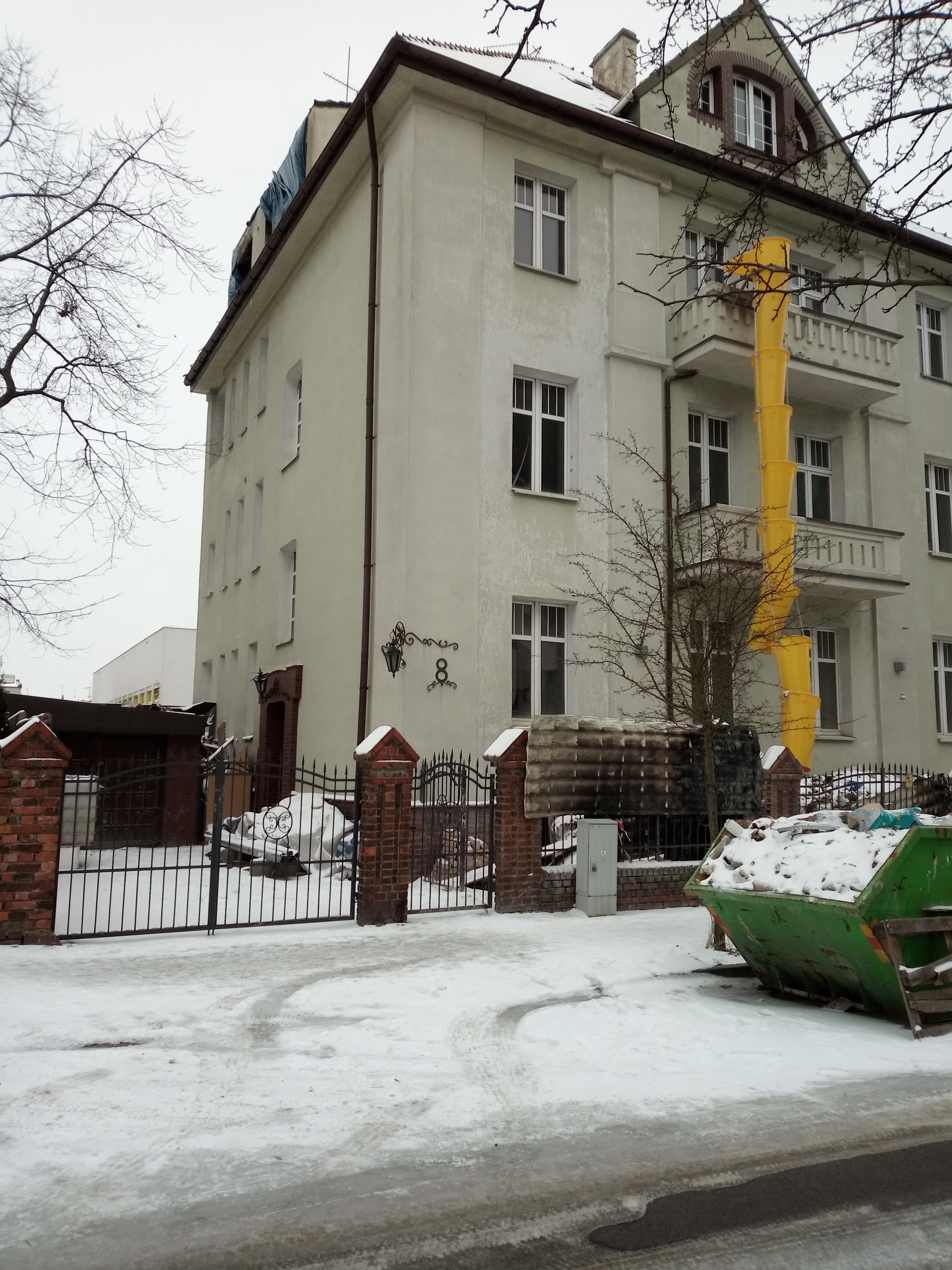
View from the street

=== Villa at 10, corner with Karłowicza street ===
1924

Early Modern architecture

This large edifice was the property of Franz Muhme, a mason, living at nearby '5 Zeppelin Straße, present day Nr.14.

The house was left in a derelict at the beginning of the 2010s. After a thorough renovation, it now houses a hotel, Hotel Chopin.

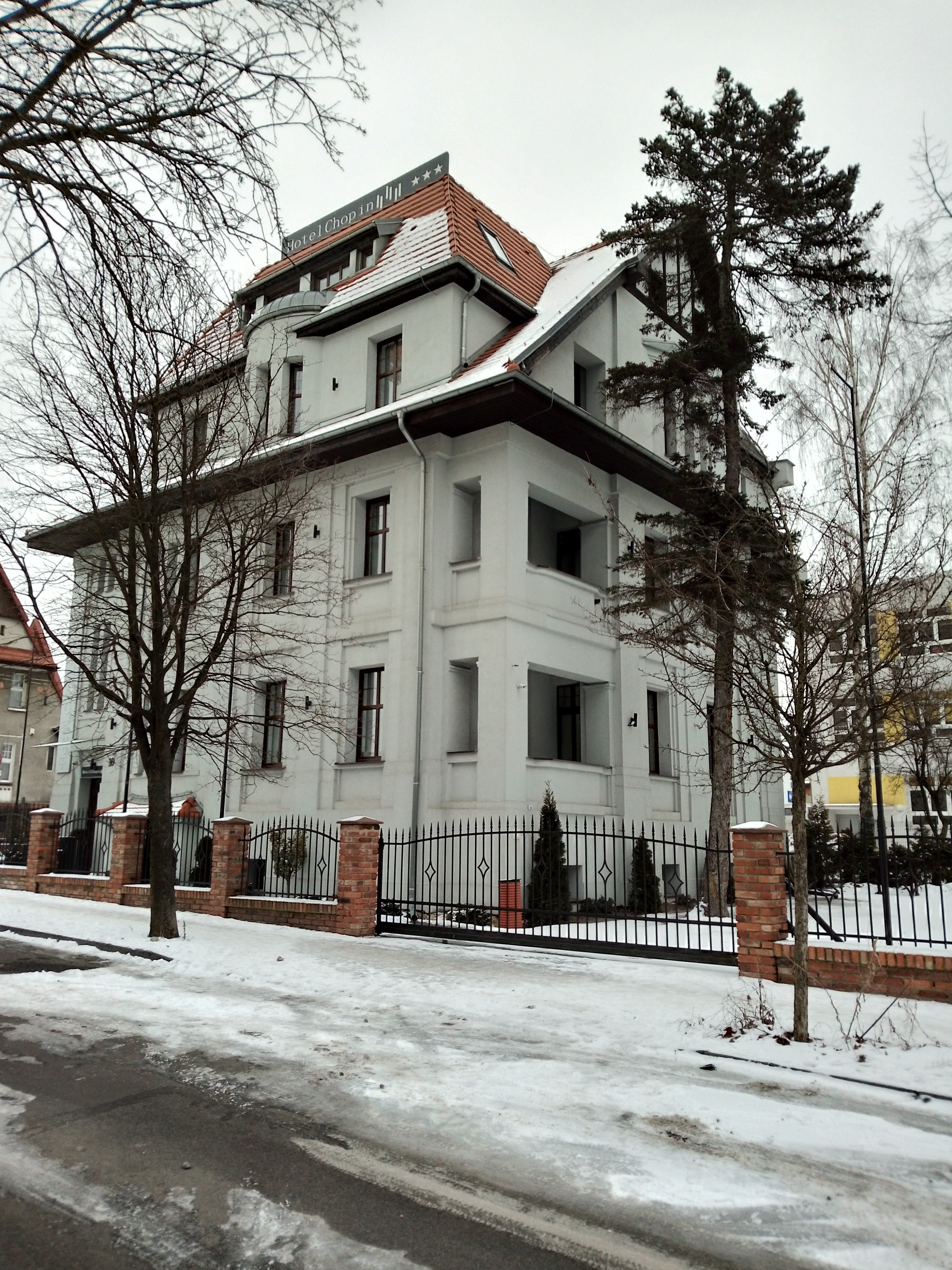
View from the street

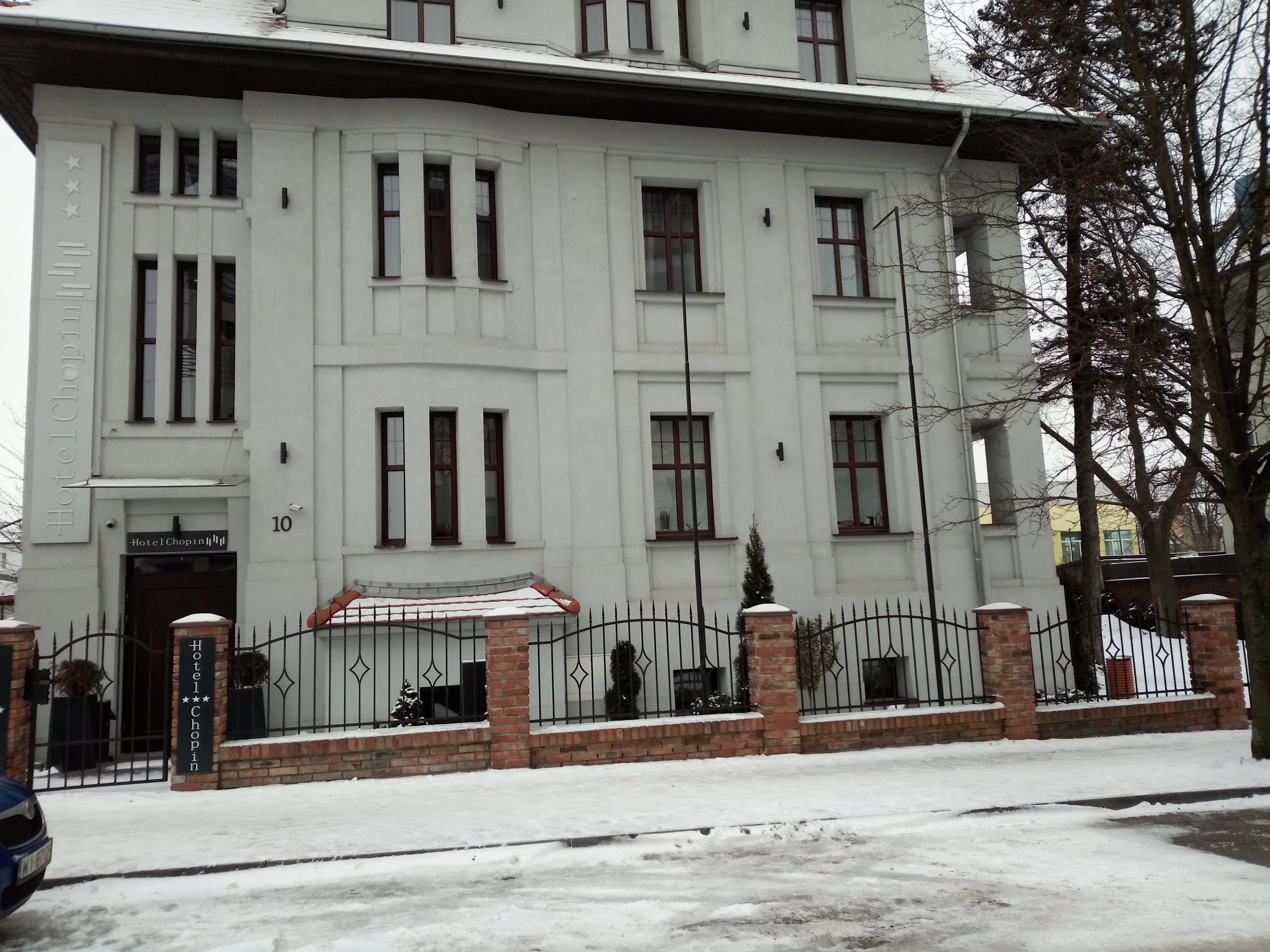
Main frontage on the street

=== Villa at 14 ===
1930s

Early Modern architecture

This large edifice was owned by Franz Muhme, a mason, also landlord at 3 Zeppelin Straße (today's Villa at 10). In the 1930s, the landlord was a painter, Leon Drapiewski, whose family kept the ownership till the Second World War.

The villa offers a bright mix of modernist frontages with wooden eaves.

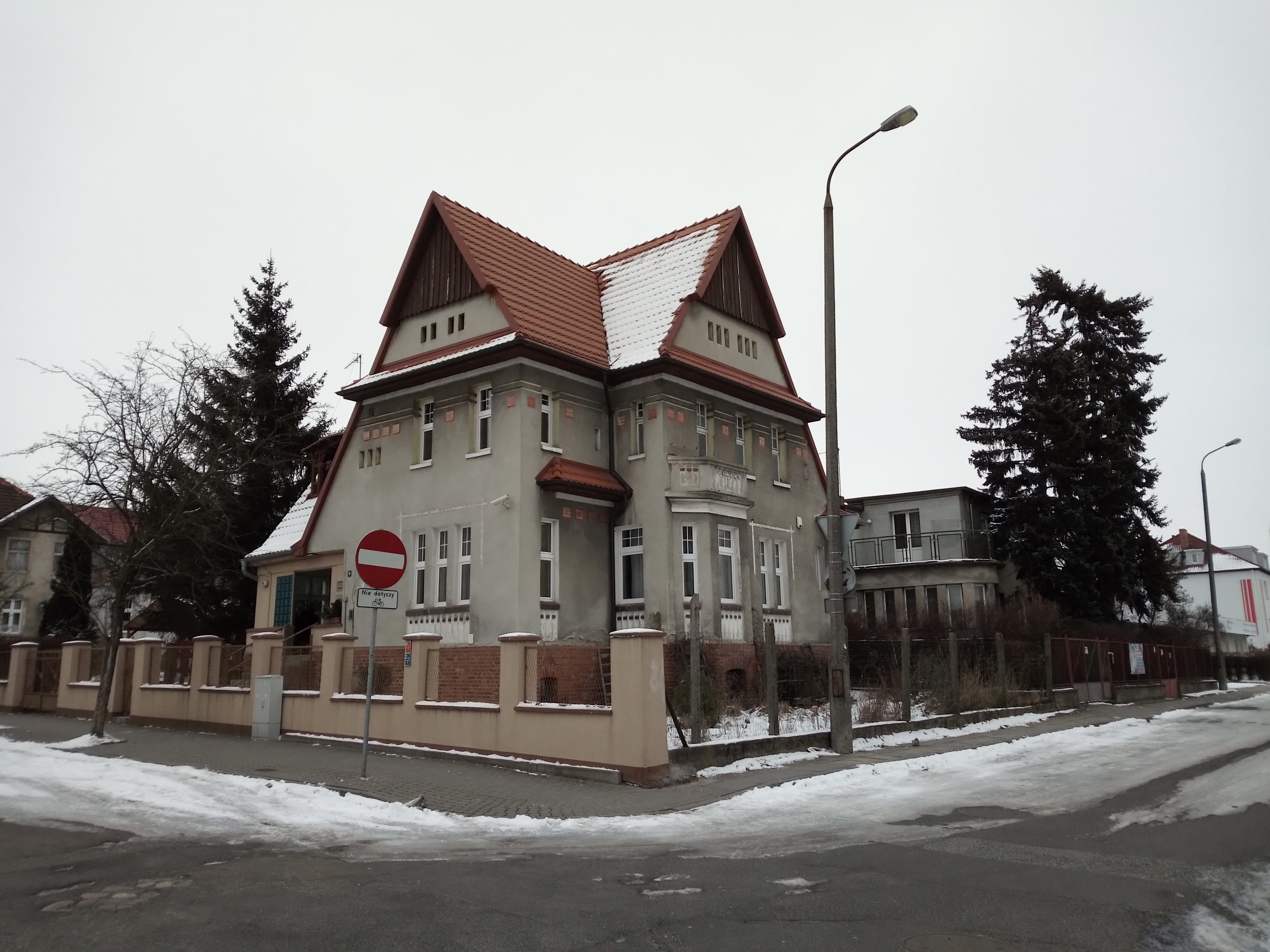
View from the street

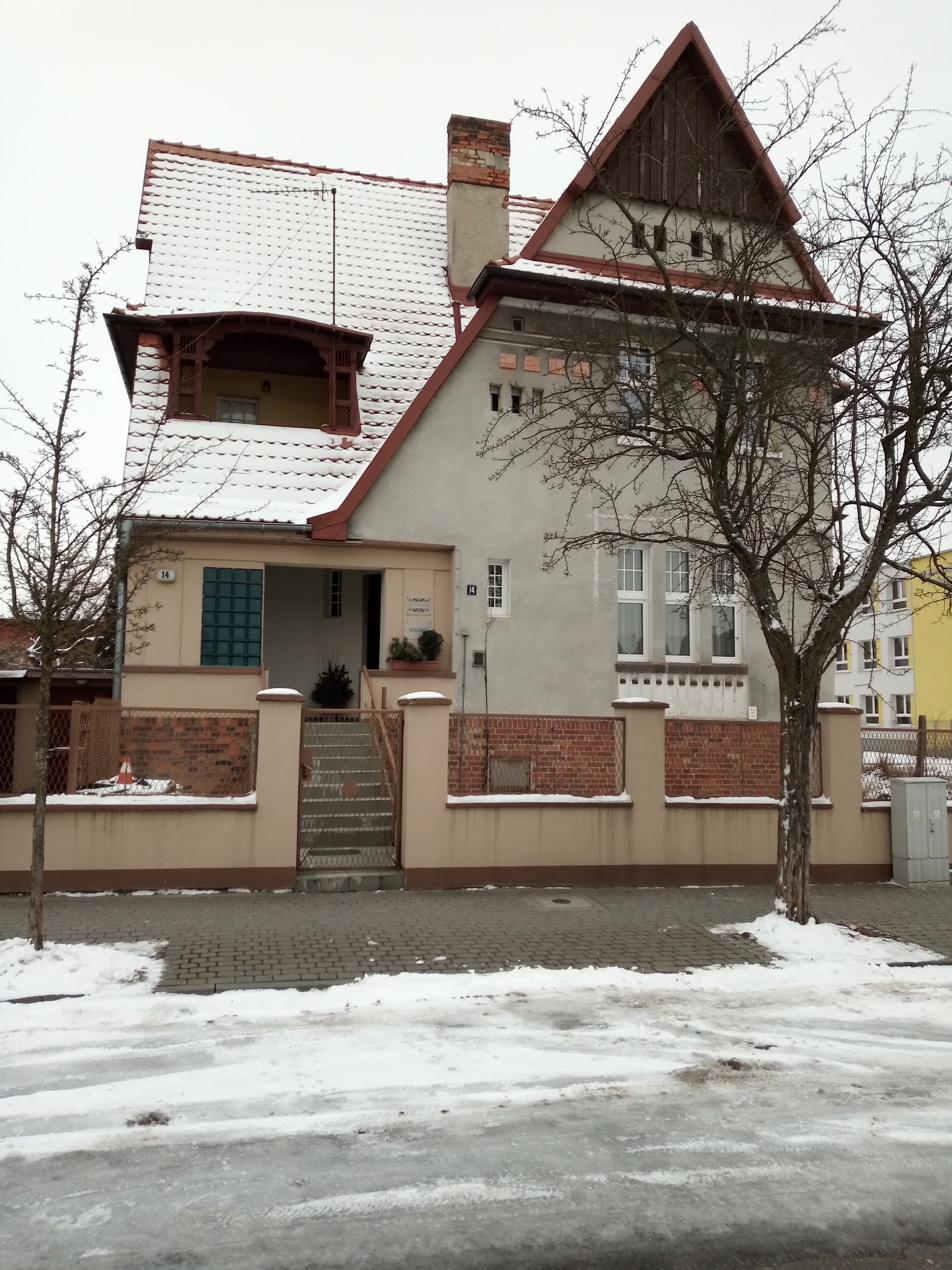
Frontage on Chopina street

=== House at 6 Moniuski street, corner with Chopina street ===
1930s

Modern architecture

This house was commissioned by Feliks Boroch, a bricklayer living at 10 Sieroca, in Szwederowo district.

The villa is characteristic of the 1930s modernist houses that mushroomed in this period in Bydgoszcz. Many of them can be found in the nearby area of Sielanka, on Ossoliński Alley or on Józef Weyssenhoff Square.

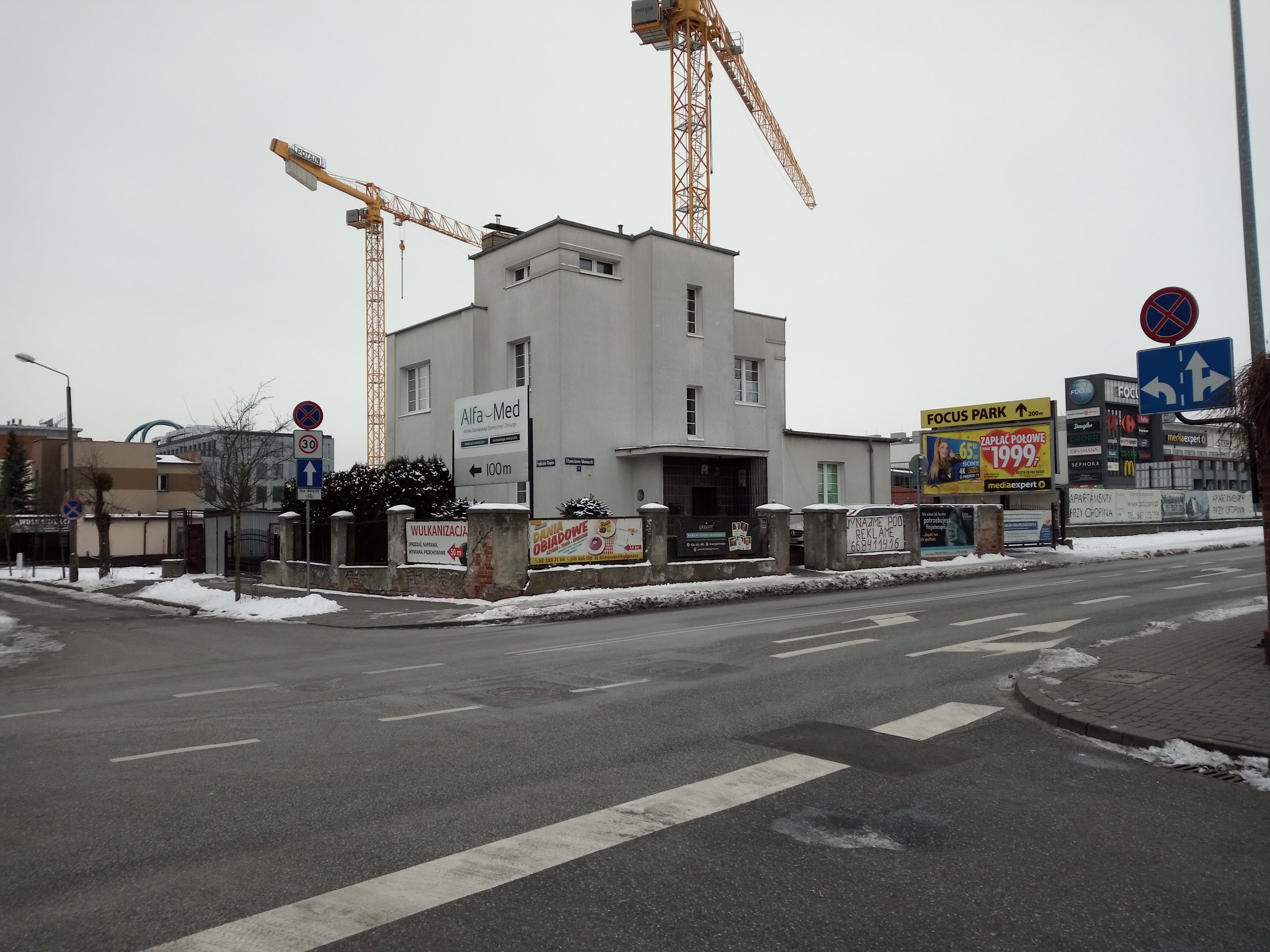
View from the street crossing

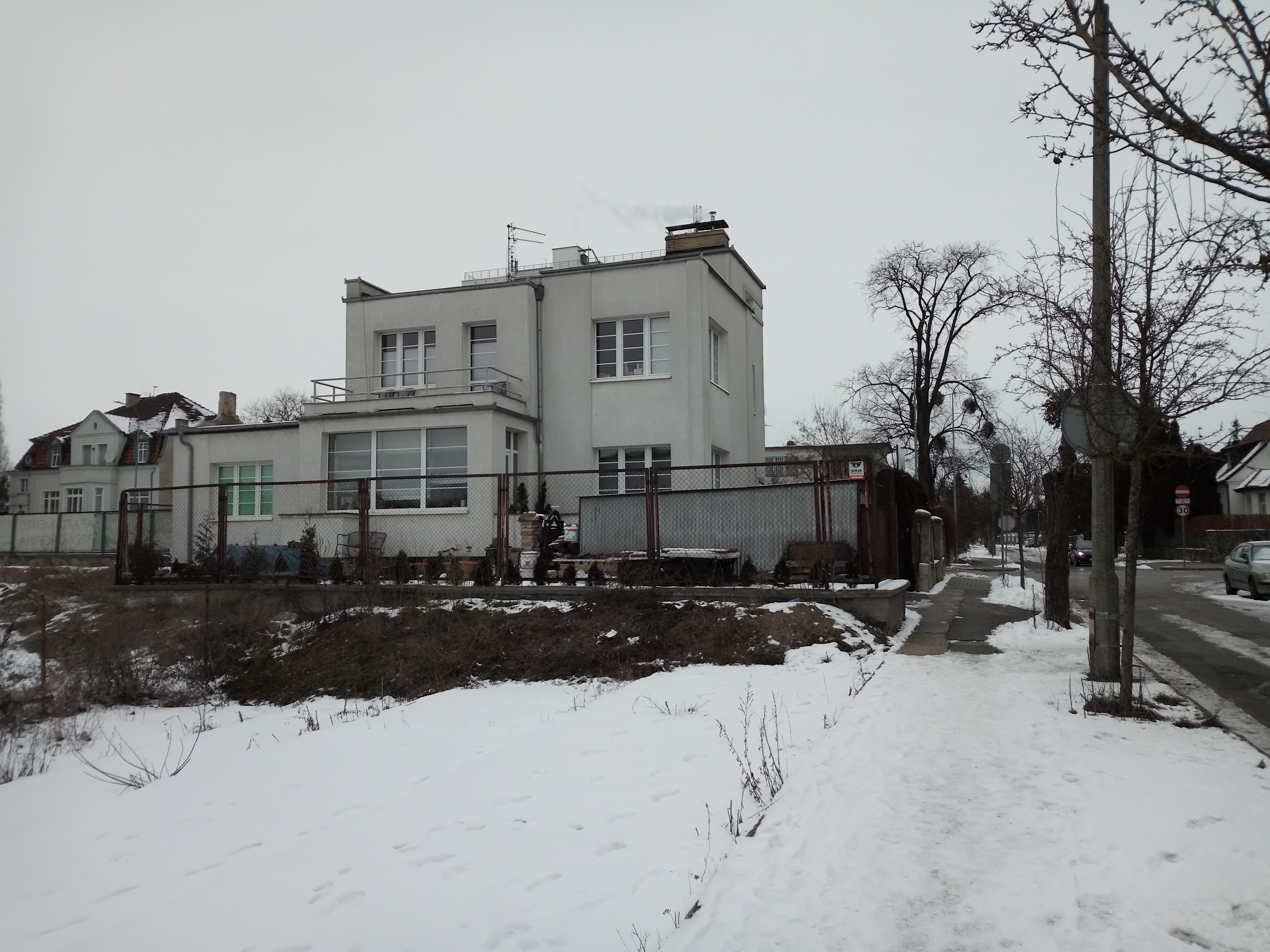
View from Chopina street

=== Bruno Sommerfeld's villa at 18 ===
1930s

Early Modern architecture

One of the original houses built in the street, it had been the property and abode of Bruno Sommerfeld (1878–1950). He was a piano maker who, from 1921 to 1945, ran a factory (at Pomorska Street, moved in 1925 to Gdańska Street) and warehouses for pianos in Bydgoszcz (at Śniadeckich Street, Jagiellońska street). The company was the largest factory of pianos and grand pianos in Polish interwar period, having around 200 employees. In 1938, it had branches in Grudziądz, Gdańsk, Katowice, Łódź, Poznań and Warsaw. In the first years of production, the firm was named Bracia Sommerfeld (Sommerfeld Brothers), owned together with Ernest, who later was the manager of the branch in Poznań.

On December 4, 1926, Bruno married Julianna née Hazemann (born 1899), who originated from Hochwald in then Prussian-occupied Alsace. They had three children, Józef (1927), Anna Maria (1929) and Bruno Herbert Karl (1931). Initially living in this villa, the family afterwards moved in turn to Jagiellońska street and Gdańska Street. Very few is known about Sommerfeld's fate after 1945: it is supposed that they fled Bydgoszcz before the end of the war and that Bruno died in the 1950s in Berlin.

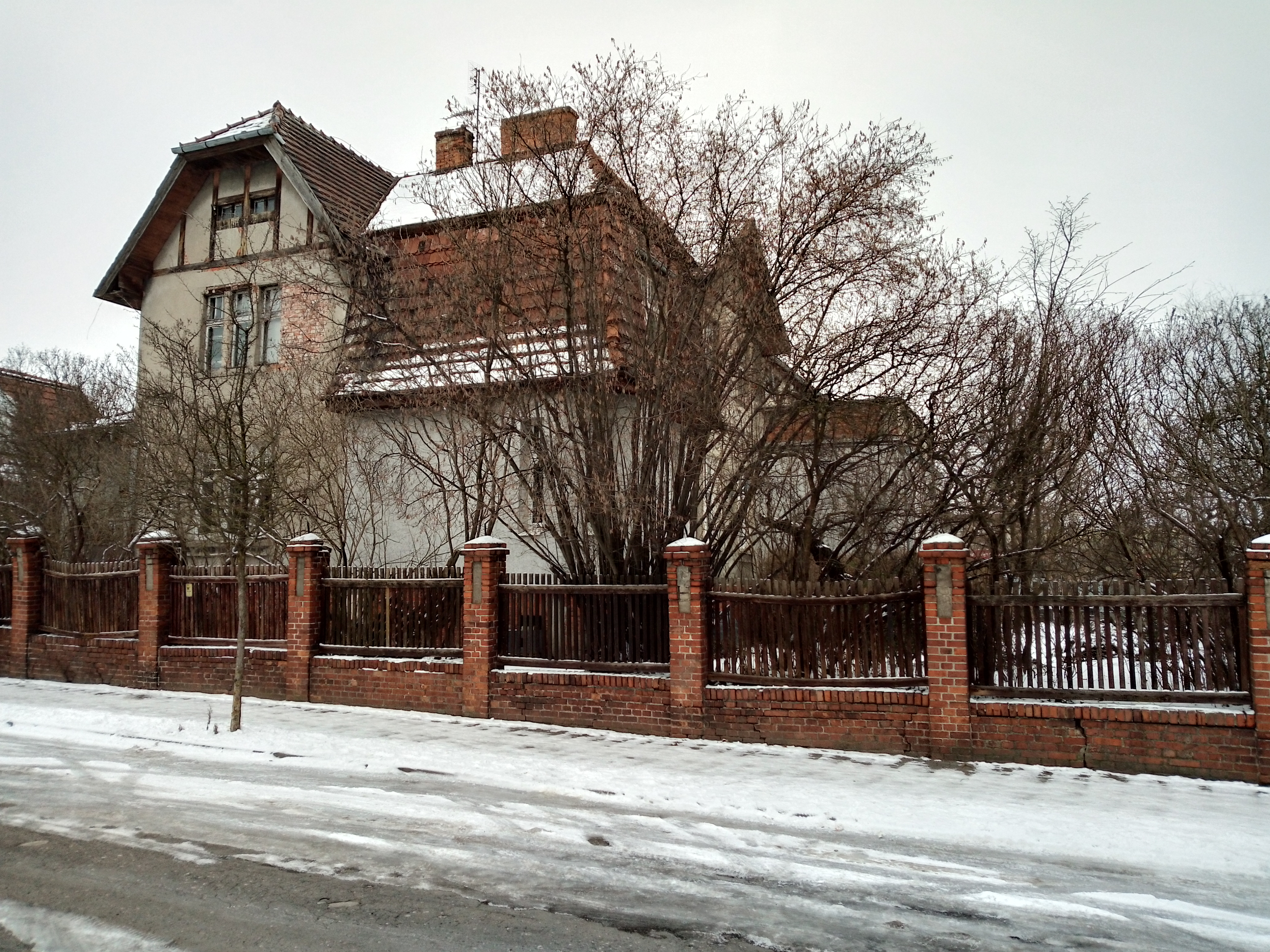
View from the street

=== Houses at 13, 17a, 26a, 28 ===
1930s

Modern architecture

These villas have been built in the late 1930s, in the wake of similar construction that occurred in the nearby area of Sielanka. They recall realizations of local architects of this period, such as Bolesław Polakiewicz or Edward Stecewicz.

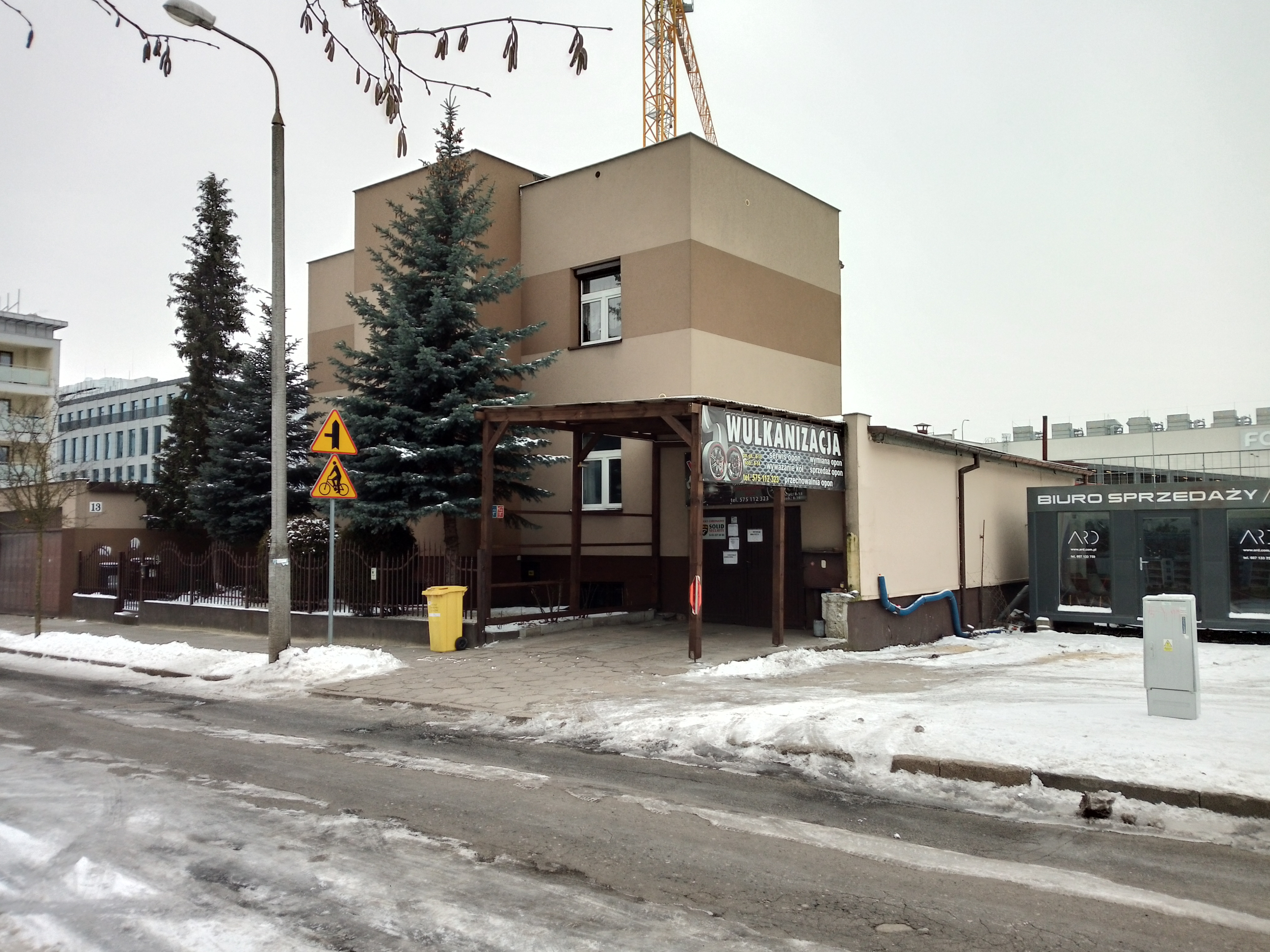
Villa at Nr.13

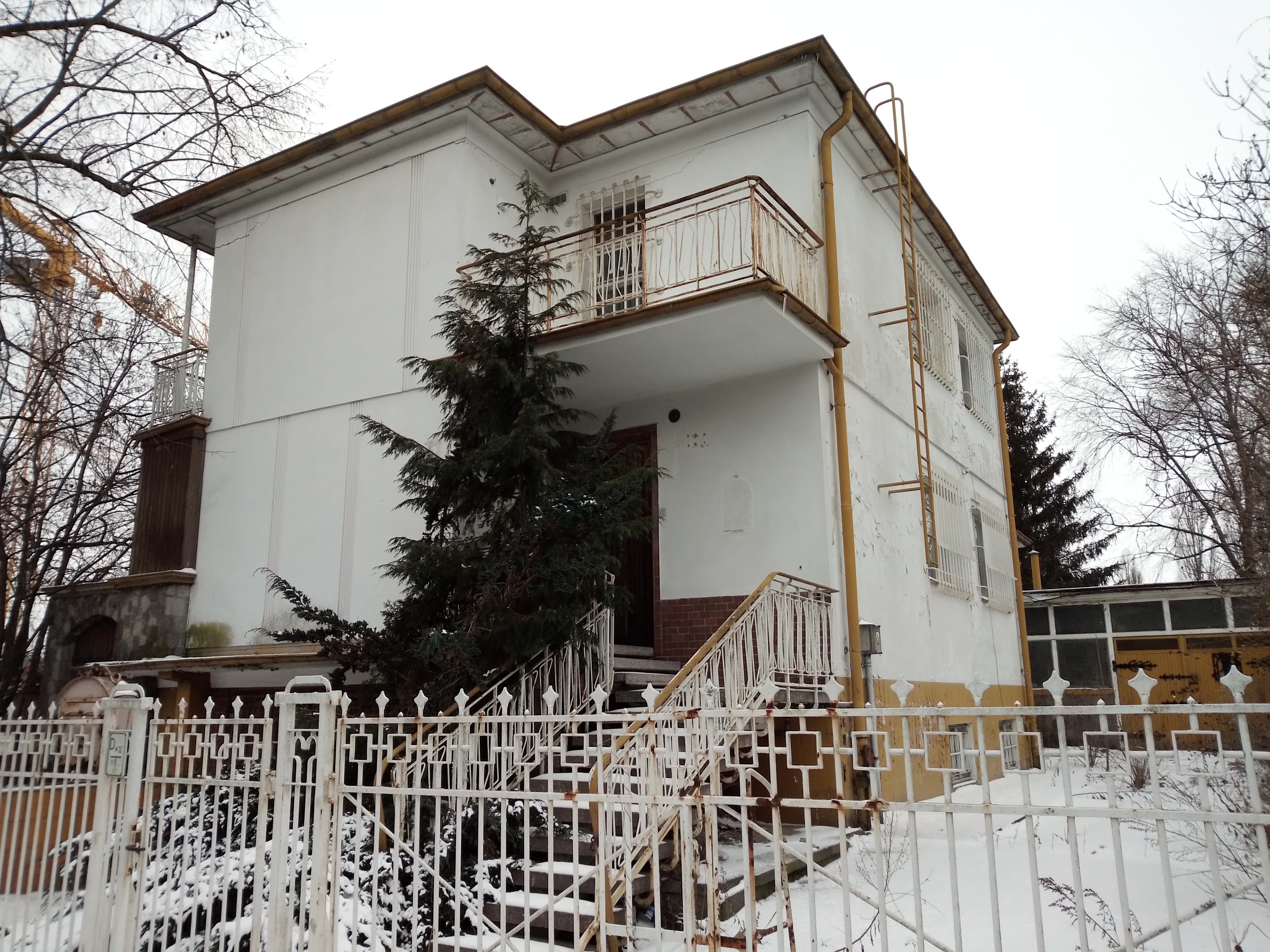
Villa at Nr.17a

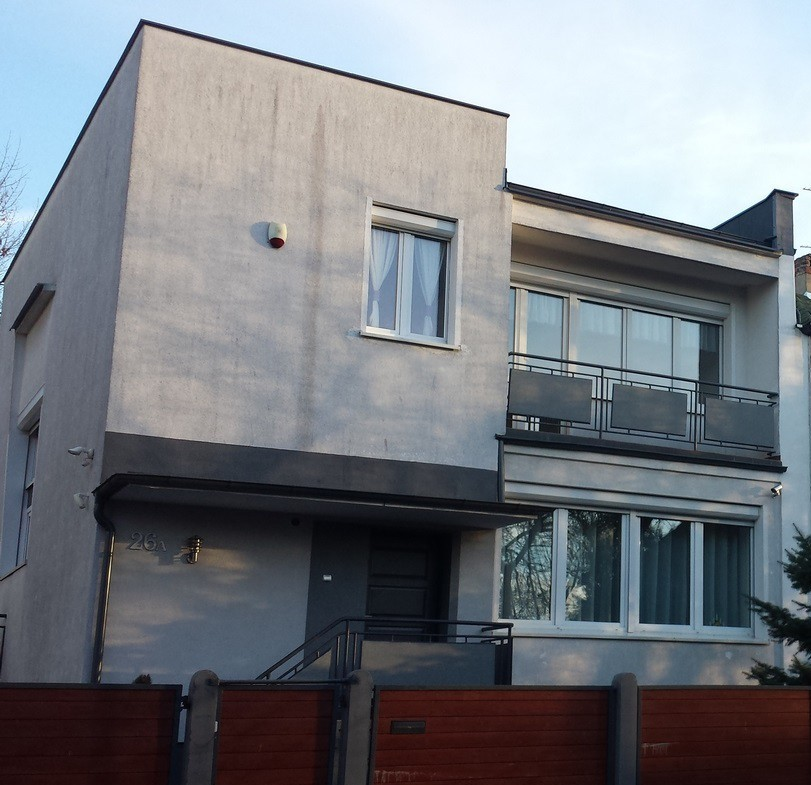
Villa at Nr.26a

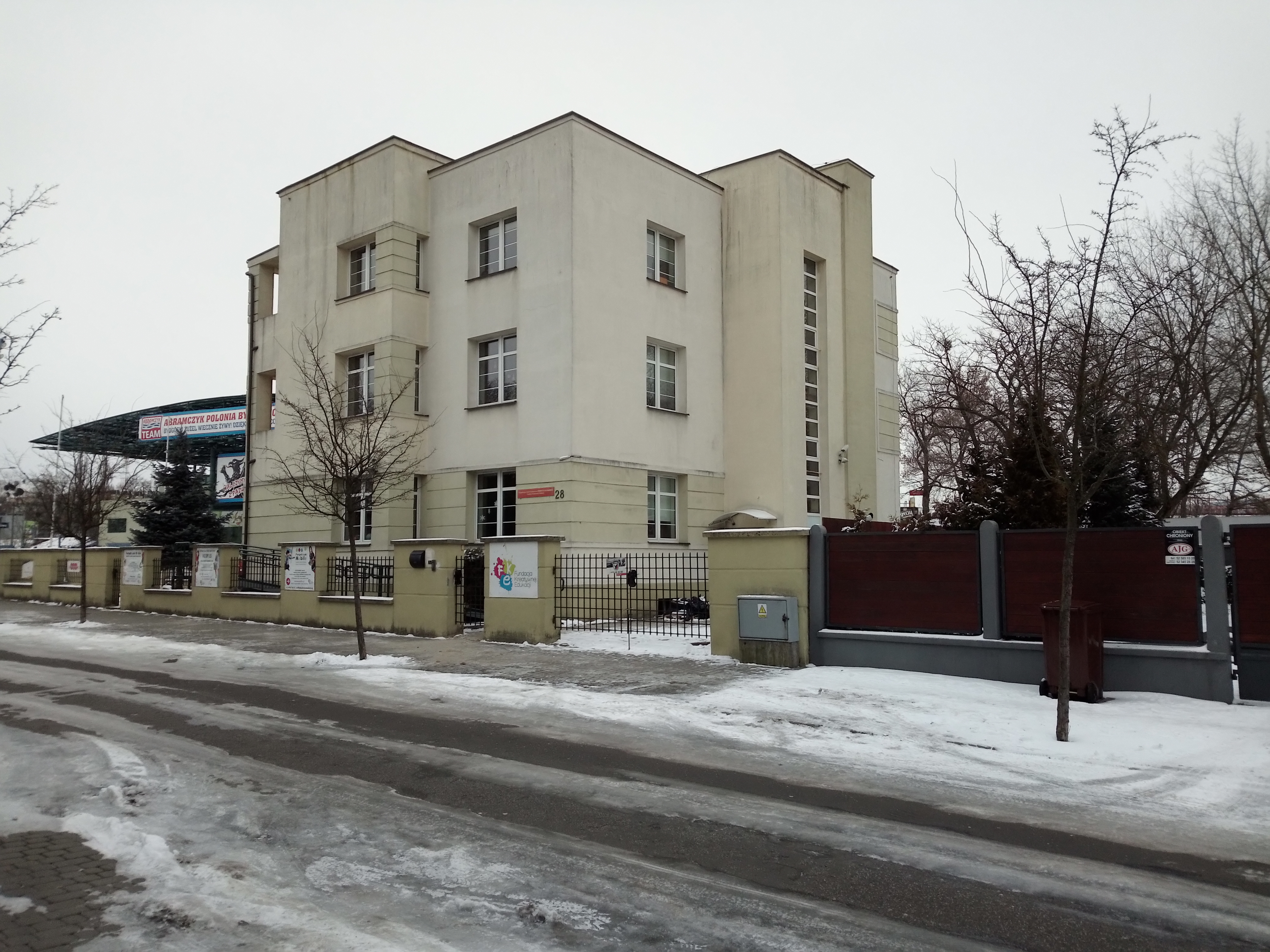
Villa at Nr.28

== See also ==
- Bydgoszcz
- Michał Łempicki
- (in Polish) Bruno Sommerfeld
- (in Polish) Bruno Sommerfeld's piano's factory
