= Grzegorz Kardaś =

Polish pianist, 20th Century

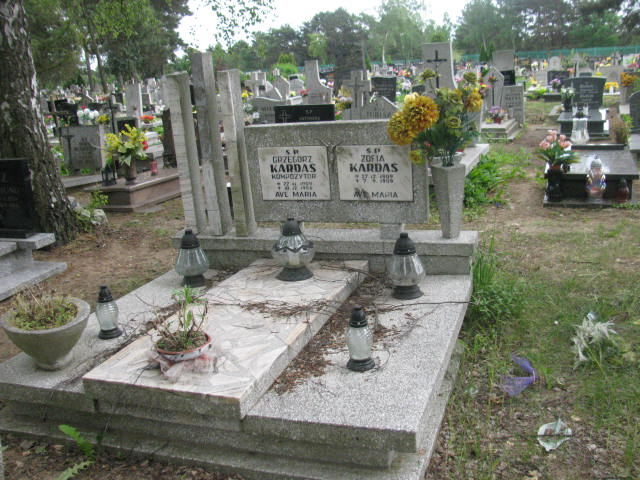

Background information
- Also known as: Grzela
- Born: November 22, 1909; Bromberg, German Empire
- Died: 10 December 1988 (aged 79) Bydgoszcz, Poland
- Genres: Classical music
- Occupations: Musician, composer, music director
- Instrument: Piano

Grzegorz Kardaś (1909–1988), was a Polish pianist, composer and music director of the Polish theatre in Bydgoszcz and several other scenes in Kuyavian-Pomeranian Voivodeship from 1948 till 1975.

== Biography ==
=== Youth and studies ===
Grzegorz Kardaś was born on 22 November 1909, in Bydgoszcz (then Bromberg), from Franciszek, a white-collar worker, and Helena née Echaust. After graduating from primary school in Bydgoszcz, he attended a Salesian High School at Aleksandrów Kujawski. There, he passed in May 1930, his secondary school-leaving examination.

He began his musical education at the Bydgoszcz Conservatory of Music, then moved to Poznań. In this city, Kardaś attended the Piotrowski Music School and initially studied law. Two years later, he changed to musicology at the Faculty of Philosophy of the Adam Mickiewicz University. In 1933, when his father became seriously ill, he was forced to interrupt his studies to take up a paid work. He became a salesman at the Poznań's branch of Bydgoszcz-based Bruno Sommerfeld piano factory.

Radio announcement, 7 June 1936

In 1934, Grzegorz began his artistic career by giving a concert on Radio Merkury, future Radio Poznań, now a regional station of Polskie Radio. The program included a duet with Stanisław Dzięgielewski, performed from Tadeusz Hernes's Stratosfera cabaret. Tadeusz Zygmunt Hernes (1906, Borzykowo – 1940, Katyn) was a journalist, satirist, and humorist, who founded and chaired the literary and artistic club Stratosfera, regularly collaborating with local papers and radio stations.

In 1937, after his graduation, Kardaś transferred to Warsaw to become the manager of Bruno Sommerfeld's local branch of pianos and grand pianos. At the same period, he started working with the national Polish Radio as a soloist.

=== Second World War ===
During the German occupation, Grzegorz stayed in the Polish capital, earning a living by playing in cabarets and giving concerts with, among others, conductor Jerzy Stefan or pianist Irena Kurpisz-Stefanowa. He stayed active in an underground radio station. At the end of the Warsaw Uprising in 1944, he was deported to Częstochowa and worked as a glazier in Stępniewski's company.

In March 1945, he returned to his hometown to take a position at the Bydgoszcz regional station of the Polish Radio as a pianist, improviser, accompanist, and composer. He created several radio programs: one of the most popular was Pokrzywy nad Brdą (Nettles on the Brda river), produced in collaboration with Jeremi Przybora, the first regular satirical program in post-war Polish radio. He also worked as a pianist at the Pomeranian Arts House on Gdańska Street. He additionally also worked as a pianist at the Ul café located on 20 May Avenue (present day Gdańsk Street).

=== Post-war years activity ===
Between 1948 and 1949, Kardaś was the music director at the Polish Theatre in Bydgoszcz, renamed State Theatre of the Pomeranian Region after the reorganization of the newly state-owned scenes. At the end of 1975, he retired from the position after more than 25 years of service.

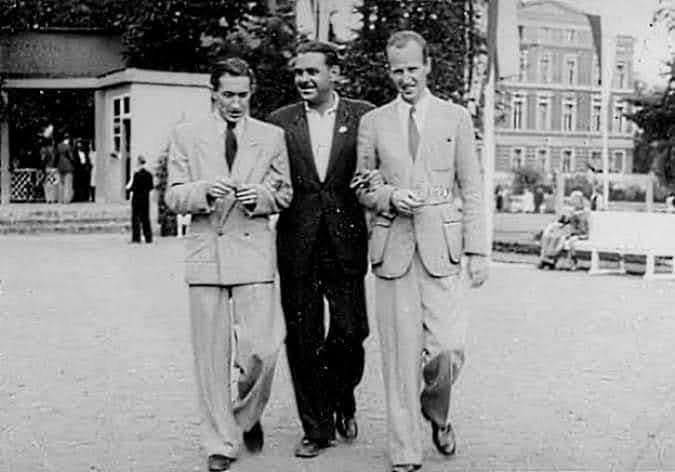
Grzegorz Kardaś (middle) in 1946

He composed and arranged music for numerous theatrical productions. Many of his musical creations gained fame beyond Pomeranian and Kuyavian theatres. Hence Ludmila Legut's play Kłopoty zbója Madeja (The Troubles of the Robber Madej), featuring his songs, was performed in ten theaters, including Warsaw. Furthermore, the television adaption of Eugène Labiche's comedy Always Together (Zawsze we troje) gathered a wide audience, thanks to Kardaś's songs performed by a first-rate cast of actors.

Kardaś was also the music director of other scenes:

- Toruń stage (1949 to 1959);
- Olsztyn and Elbląg together with Janusz Maćkowiak (1973/74 and 1974/75).

Later in his life, he was often invited to work back with these city theatres. Furthermore, Grzegorz collaborated, mainly as a composer, with most of the dramatic theatres in the country: Szczecin (1952, 1968), Kalisz (1955, 1968), Rzeszów (1958, 1983), Białystok (1960), Zielona Góra (1963), Katowice (1964), Częstochowa (1966, 1978), Poznań (1968, 1982), Tarnów (1969), Bielsko-Biała (1971), Kielce (1975), Wrocław (1978) or Grudziądz (between 1955 and 1975).

He also composed for Bydgoszcz cabaret groups (Wróbelek,O-Wady), radio entertainment programs and individual solo singers:

- Ola Obarska;
- Krystyna Wodnicka;
- Jerzy Bekker;
- Leonard Milczyński;
- Zdzisław Pruss.

His creations turned as well towards classic poets (Konstanty Gałczyński, Julian Tuwim, Jan Lechoń).

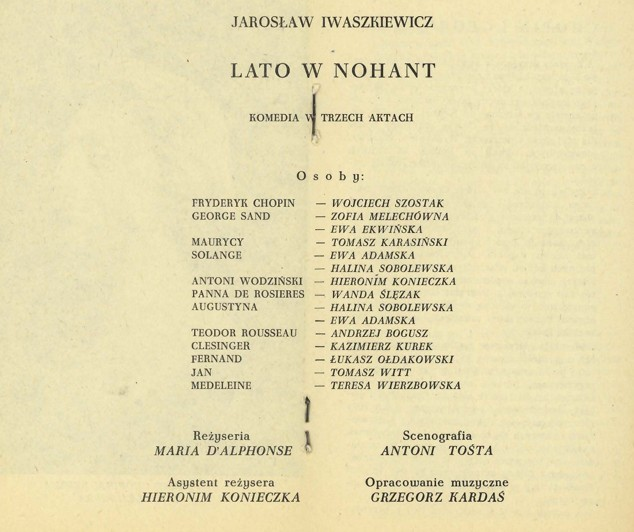
Lato w Nohant libretto, music by Kardaś, 1971

Kardaś's song Deszczowy Chłopak (The Rainy Boy), with lyrics by Jerzy Bekker and performed by Grażyna Czarnecka, received an honorable mention at the 1966 National Festival of Polish Song in Opole.

Grzegorz was an expert in piano improvisations and interludes, especially between successive radio studio broadcast. His abilities originated from his youthful fascination with jazz. Andrzej Trzaskowski (1933–1998), a famed Polish jazz musician, ranked Grzegorz Kardaś amongst the six most outstanding Polish jazz musicians from the post-war pioneering period, alongside Jan Cajmer, Jerzy Harald, Władysław Szpilman or Waldemar Maciszewski.

During his retirement, he continued to work part-time at the Polish Theatre. He was also active in community activities: ZAiKS Association of Polish Authors, Musicians' Union and the Trade Union of Culture and Art Workers.

Grzegorz Kardaś died on 10 December 1988. He was buried at the Bydgoszcz municipal cemetery on Wiślana Street.

== Personal life ==
His musical talents were matched by his character: kindness, conversational brilliance and sense of humor.

He was married to Zofia Aleksandra née Blizińska. They had a son, Andrzej Ryszard, born on 11 March 1939 in Warsaw.

== Awards and decorations ==
Kardaś was awarded the following awards:

- Polish Gold Cross of Merit in 1970;
- Badge of Honor – Bydgoszcz – Meritorious Citizen in 1975;
- Bydgoszcz Cultural Information badge.

== Selection of works ==
- Pokrzywy nad Brdą (Nettles on the Brda river), radio program, 1948 (music);
- Piosenki o Bydgoszczy, song by Jan Wojakiewicz, 1946 (music);
- Deszczowy Chłopak (The Rainy Boy), lyrics by Jerzy Bekker, performed by Grażyna Czarnecka, 1966 (music);
- Zawsze we troje (Always Together), E. Labiche play, 1969 (music);
- Kłopoty zbója Madeja (The Troubles of the Robber Madej), play by Ludmila Legut, 1977 (songs);
- Popas Króla Jegomości (His Majesty's King's Pasture), play by Adam Adam Grzymała-Siedlecki, December 1978 (music);
- Piosenki pana Grzegorza (Songs of Mr Grzegorz), 1980, celebrating Grzegorz Kardaś's artistic career 45th anniversary.

== See also ==
- Bydgoszcz
- List of Polish people
- Bydgoszcz Music Academy - "Feliks Nowowiejski"
- Pomeranian Philharmonic
- Music Schools Group in Bydgoszcz

== Bibliography ==
- Adamus-Szymborska, Ewa; Pruss, Zdzisław; Pietrzak, Zbigniew (2000). Bydgoski leksykon teatralny [Bydgoszcz Theatre Lexicon] (in Polish). Bydgoszcz: Kujawsko-Pomorskie Towarzystwo Kulturalne. pp. 200–202. ISBN 8385327592.
- Błażejewski, Stanisław; Kutta, Janusz; Romaniuk, Marek (2000). Bydgoski Słownik Biograficzny [Bydgoszcz Biographical Dictionary] (in Polish). Bydgoszcz: Kujawsko-Pomorskie Towarzystwo Kulturalne. p. 46. ISBN 8385327584.
- Weber, Alicja; Pruss, Zdzisław; Kuczma, Rajmund (2004). Bydgoski leksykon muzyczny [Bydgoszcz Musical Lexicon] (in Polish). Bydgoszcz: Kujawsko-Pomorskie Towarzystwo Kulturalne. pp. 254–255. ISBN 9788389734150.
