= Georg Schwechten =

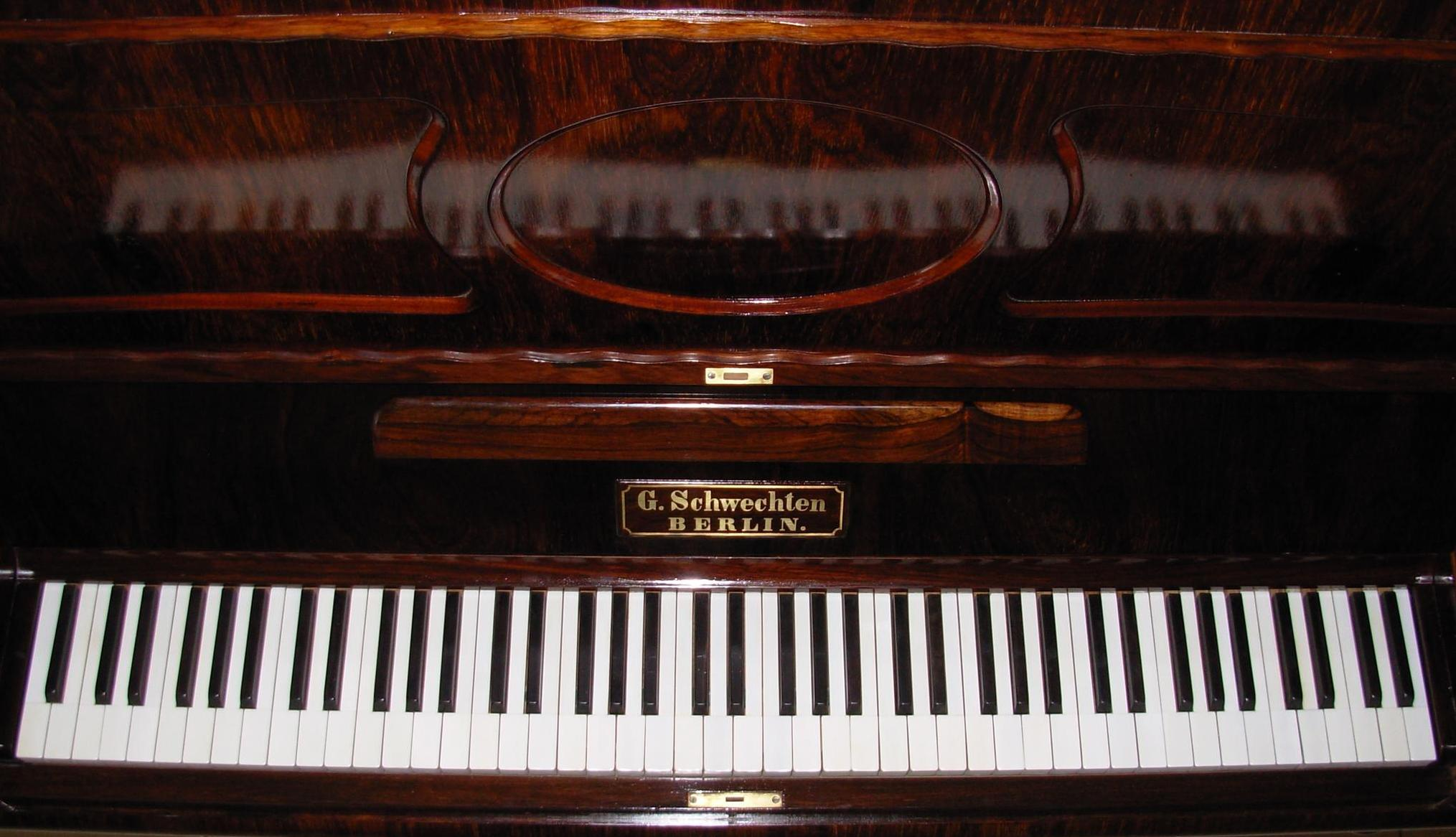
Ivory keyboard of G. Schwechten Piano series No. 6171, made before 1870.

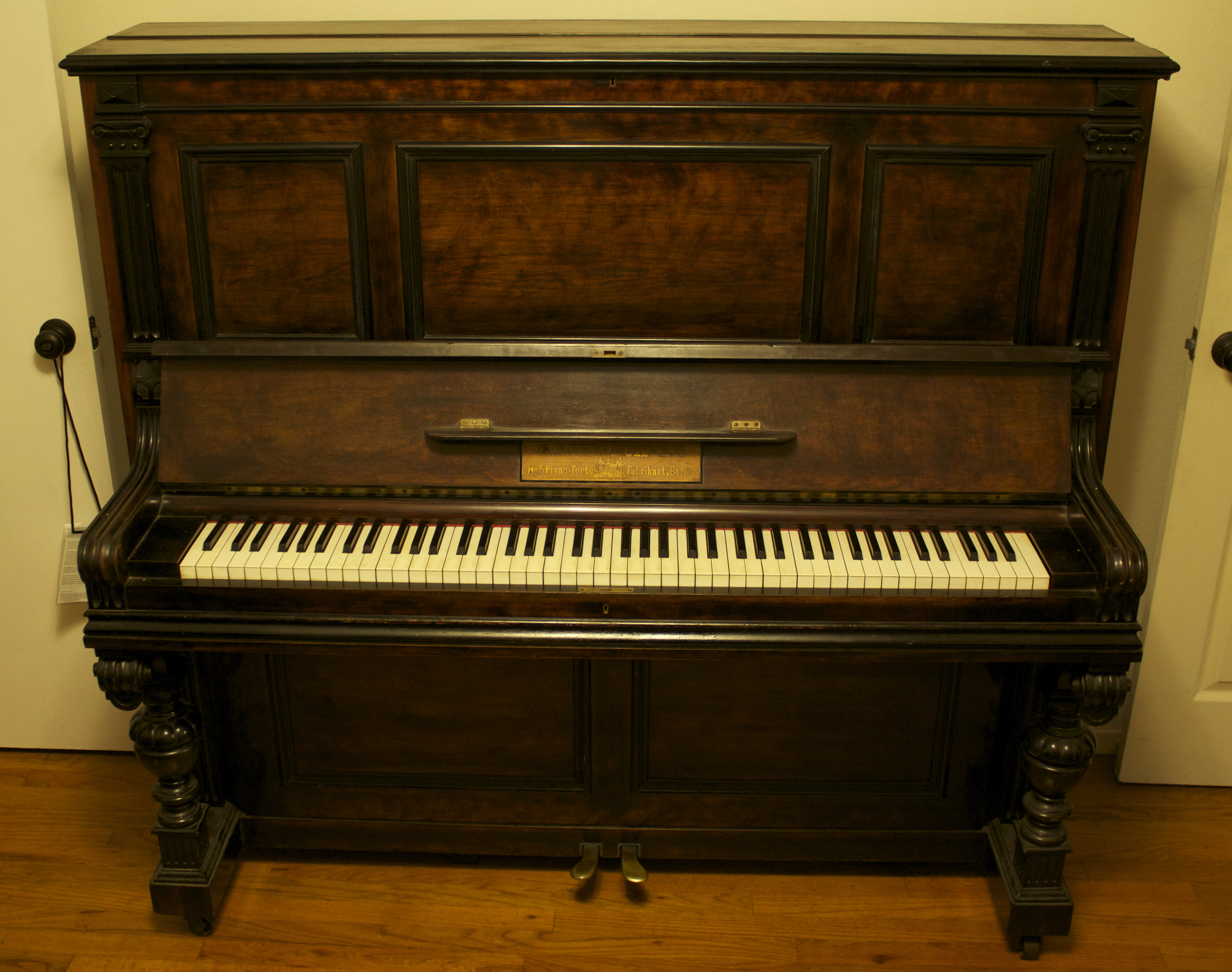

Georg Schwechten was a Berlin-based manufacturer of fine pianos.

== History ==
In his book "A Dictionary of Pianists and Composers for the Pianoforte" by Ernst Pauer, he lists these details about the company: "Schwechten, G., of Berlin, manufacturer to the Court. Founded 1854, and employs at present 120 workmen. The specialty is uprights, of which (1893) not less than 22,000 have been sold. Medals have been awarded in London, Paris, Vienna, Philadelphia, Melbourne, &c."

Production began in 1854 and continued up through 1925.

According to Christopher and Anne Acker, Schwechten pianos are, "Extremely rare, no finer pianos have ever been made than those of the house of Schwechten. Based in Berlin, Schwechten pianos are prime examples of the top quality work that came out of some very small shops in Germany and Austria in the 19th century. The Schwechten line of pianos began with his elder brother Heinrich's shop in 1839. Georg Schwechten established his shop in Berlin in 1853 and specialized in exquisite hand crafted pianos such as this one. This fabulous line of instruments ended with Georg, who died in 1902."
