= Wolfframm =

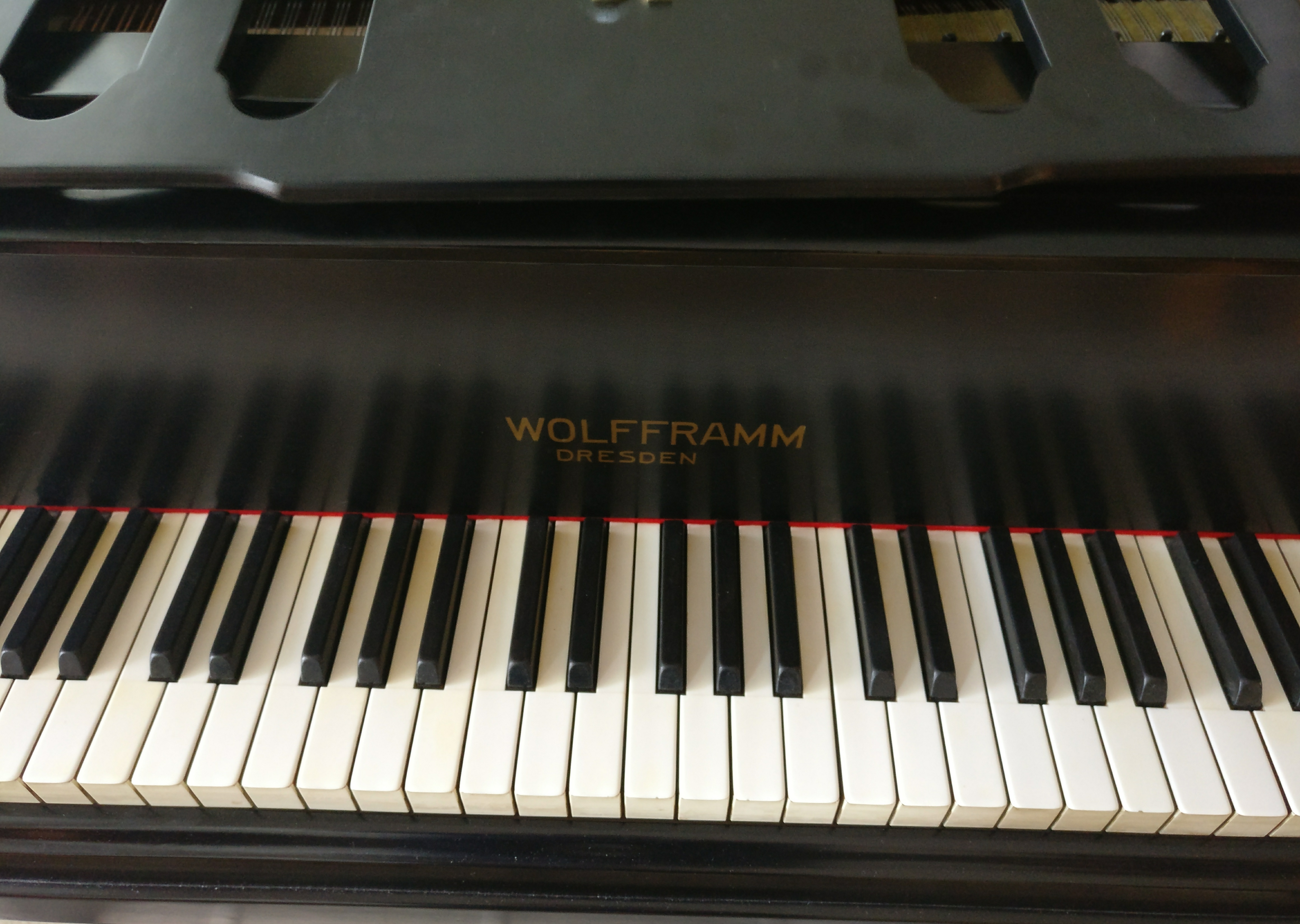
Branding on Wolfframm Dresden grand piano

Wolfframm was a German manufacturer of pianos and grand pianos, based in Dresden. The company was founded in 1872 and initially produced music instruments under brand name "Apollo", but in 1935 changed the name to "Ernst Rosenkranz". Manufacturing ceased in the mid-20th century and most Wolfframm pianos today have been reconditioned. A Wolfframm grand piano in good condition today may sell for thousands of euros.
