= Nowy Targ, Pomeranian Voivodeship =

Nowy Targ
- Village
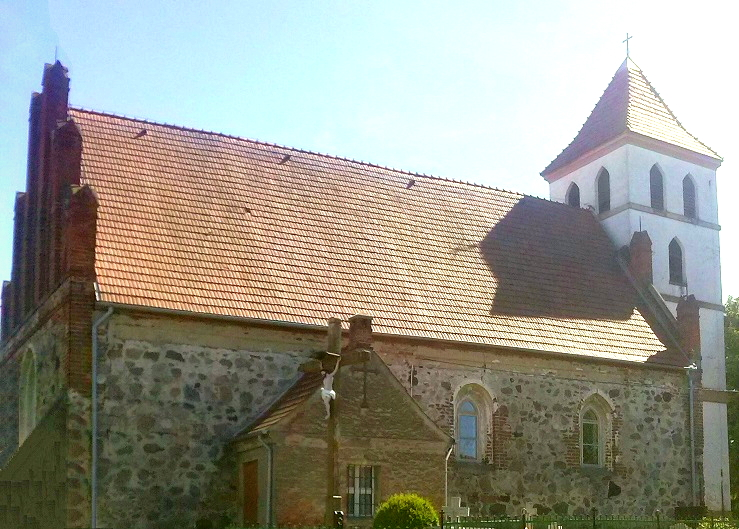
- Church of Saint Roch

- Location within Poland
- Coordinates: 53°53′53″N 19°11′7″E
- Country: Poland
- Voivodeship: Pomeranian
- County: Sztum
- Gmina: Stary Targ

Population
  - Total: 471

Nowy Targ [ˈnɔvɨ ˈtark] ("New Market") is a village in the administrative district of Gmina Stary Targ, within Sztum County, Pomeranian Voivodeship, in northern Poland.

== See also ==
- History of Pomerania
