= Karol Baliński =

- Born: 21 May 1817; Dzierzkowice
- Died: 10 January 1864 (aged 46); Lviv
- Resting place: Lychakiv Cemetery
- Occupations: Poet, revolutionary activist
- Writing career
- Language: Polish

Karol Baliński (born 21 May 1817 in Dzierzkowice, Lublin region of Poland – 10 January 1864 in Lwów Poland), also known by his pseudonym Karol z Jarosławca, was a Polish poet, revolutionary activist, and member of radical national liberation groups such as Stowarzyszenie Ludu Polskiego.

== Biography ==
His father was Tomasz Baliński – a legionary of General Jan Henryk Dąbrowski and a doctor in the Napoleonic Wars, his mother was Maria Anna Orian – born in Madrid, Spain. He graduated from elementary school in Hrubieszów and the Liceum in Warsaw.

== Career ==
He was an activist in post-revolutionist and pro-independence Polish-oriented organizations. In 1839, he was exiled to the Kazah Steppe in Siberia (initially sentenced to death), where he met Gustaw Zieliński and Adolf Januszkiewicz. Released after three years in 1842, he was arrested again in 1846 and released in April 1847, on the basis of a medical declaration of imminent death. Then he went to Eastern Lesser Poland, where he took an active part in the Spring of Nations in the Polish lands in Lwów. In 1849 he went to Poznań in Greater Poland, where he continued publishing his poems and, together with Ewaryst Estkowski, edited the weekly Krzyż i miecz. In 1851, he emigrated to Belgium and France, where he personally met Adam Mickiewicz and entered the Koło Sprawy Bożej (Circle of God's Cause).

Thought to have spent time in Jersey where in 1854 his work Myśli serdeczne (Warm thoughts) was published, also resident in Jersey was Polish exile Roch Rupniewski who wrote about Baliński in his work Niezabudki Jerseyskie 1854. In 1863 he came to the country to take part in the January Uprising, however his state of health prevented him from doing so.

He died in Lwów and was buried in the Lychakiv Cemetery, under the cross there was an inscription on the grave: Orphanage – prison, Exile – hunger. This is the path of the Polish poet Karol Baliński to this last resting place.

== Selected works ==
- Kilka prac literackich Karola Balińskiego (1845)
- Pisma Karola Balińskiego (1849)
- Grosz wdowi. Kolęda (1851)
- Myśli serdeczne Karola Balińskiego (1854)
- Śpiewakowi Mohorta bratnie słowo (1856)
- Ustęp z pieśni do Bogarodzicy (1861)
- Głos ludu polskiego w tysiącletnią rocznicę zgonu Piasta (1861)
- Mądrość polska (1861)
- Męczeństwo Zbawiciela (1863)
- Hasło polskie (1862)
- Niewierny Tomasz jak przymierzył, to uwierzył (1911)
- Kolenda polskich bojowników
- Do piewcy
- Farys-wieszcz
- Requiem staremu światu

Baliński has also published Kochankowie nieba – translation of Certamen de amor y celos (1640), originally written by Spanish dramatist Pedro Calderón de la Barca.
