= Władysław Bełza =

Polish poet (1847–1913)

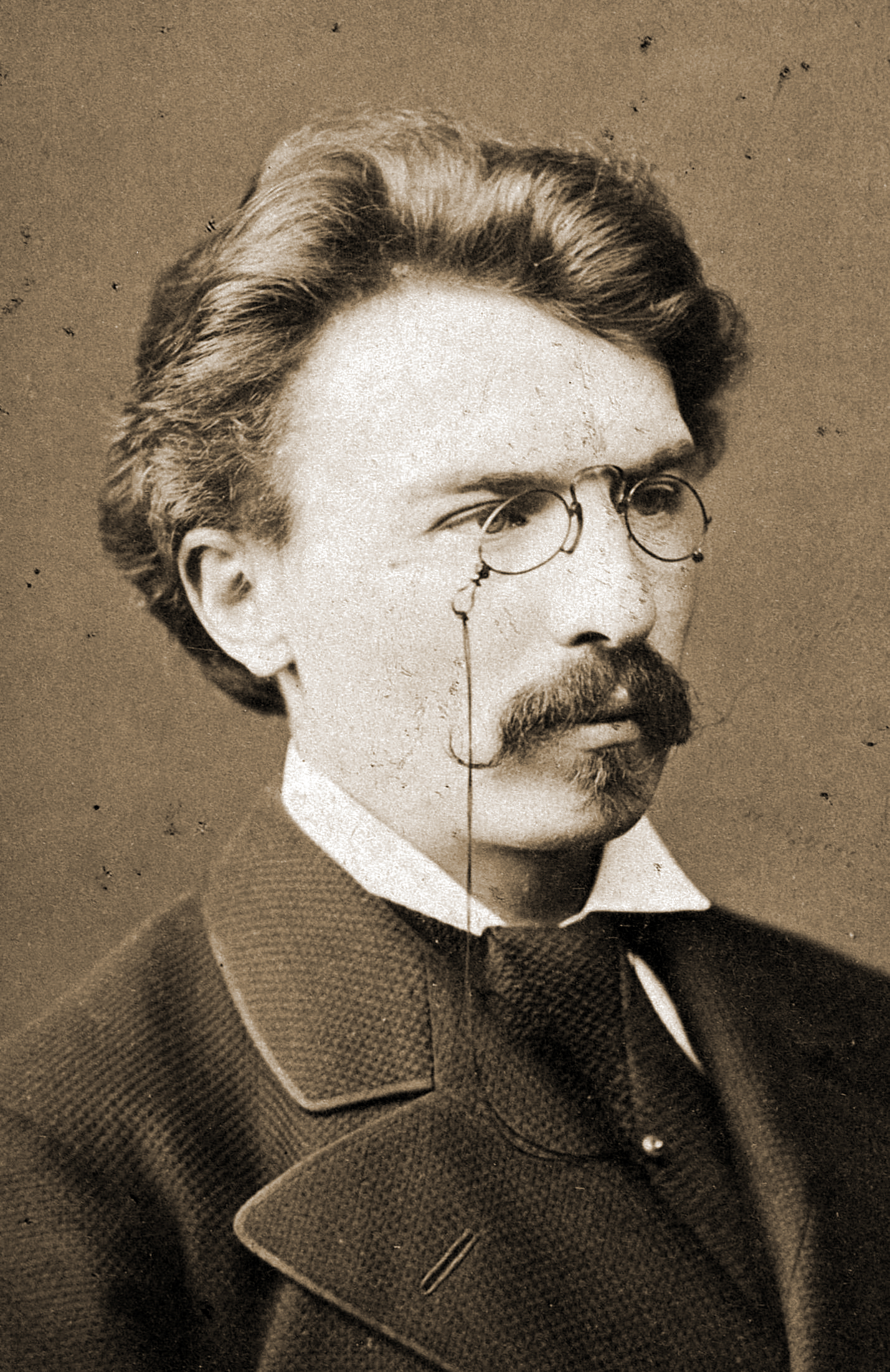
Wladyslaw Belza

Wladyslaw Belza (17 October 1847 - 29 January 1913) was a Polish poet. He was born in Warsaw.

== Works ==
- Katechizm Polskiego Dziecka (Polish Child’s Catechism), 1900
- Kto ty jesteś? Polak mały. Jaki znak twój? Orzeł biały (poem) (Who are you? I’m a young Pole. What’s your symbol? The white eagle.)
