= Henryka Sienkiewicza Street =

Street, Bydgoszcz, Poland, 19th-20th century

Coordinates: 53°07′54″N 18°00′06″E

Henryka Sienkiewicza Street, Bydgoszcz
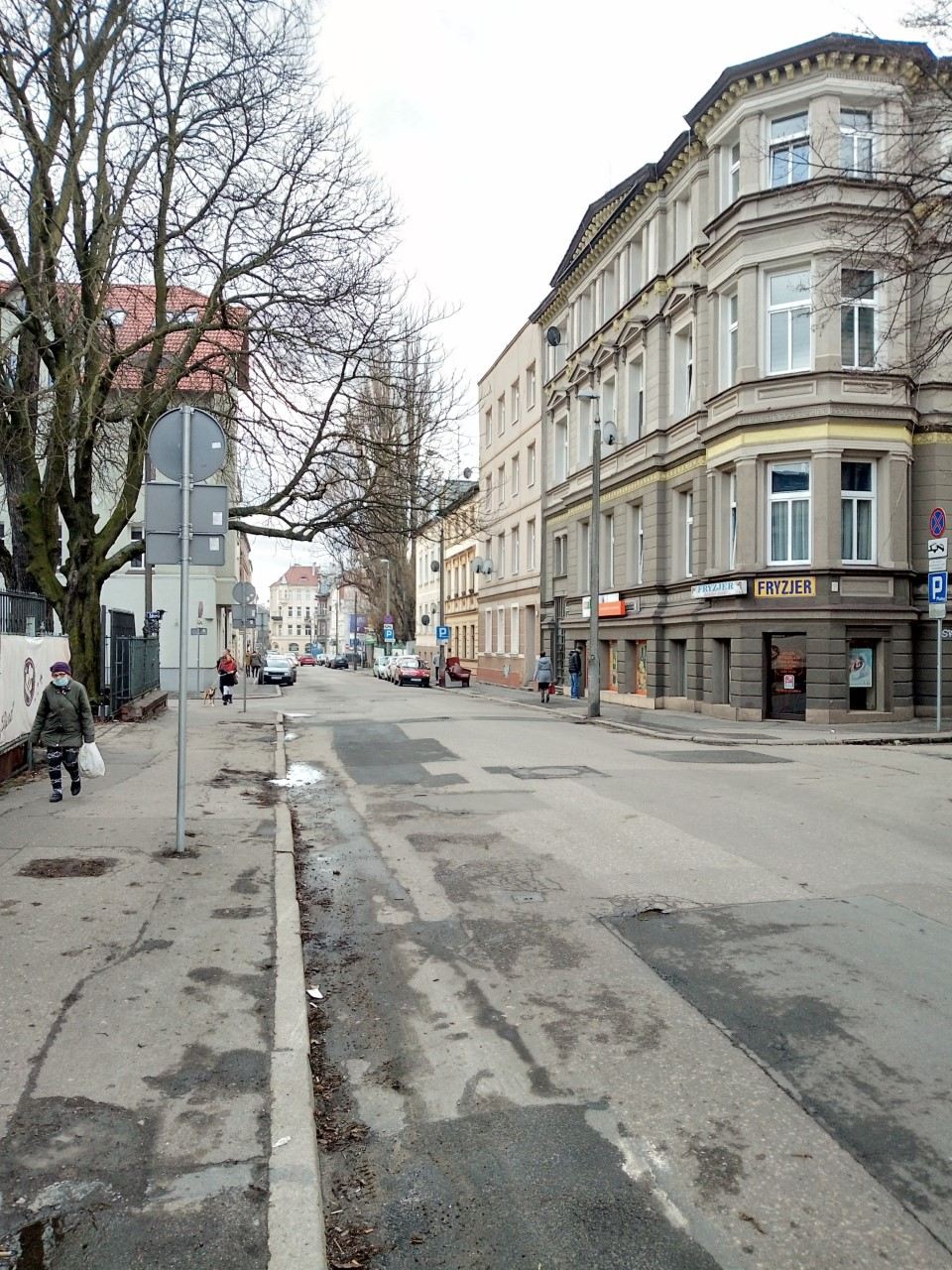
- View of the street to the south

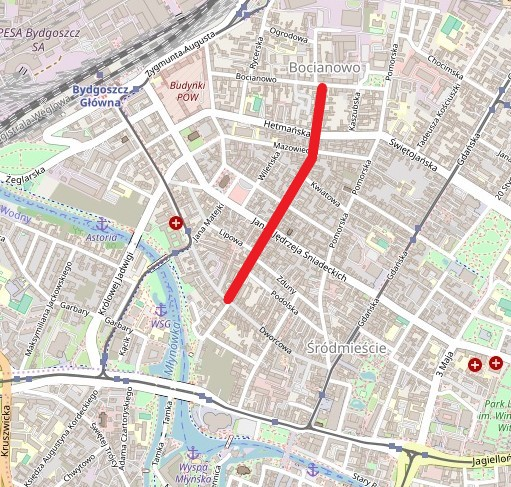
- Sienkiewicza street highlighted on a map
- Native name: Ulica Henryka Sienkiewicza w Bydgoszczy (Polish)
- Former names: Mittelstraße, Fischerstraße
- Part of: Śródmieście and Bocianowo districts
- Namesake: Henryk Sienkiewicz
- Owner: City of Bydgoszcz
- Length: 850 m (2,790 ft)
- Width: ca. 10m
- Location: Bydgoszcz, Poland

Construction
- Construction start: End of the 1860s

Sienkiewicza Street is a long thoroughfare laid in the mid-1860s in downtown Bydgoszcz. Its frontage carries several tenements which have kept their original architectural features and their historical importance.

== Location ==
The lane runs on an approximate north–south path in the west of downtown district. Stemming in the south from Dworcowa Street, its course crosses numerous other streets on the route: Podolska, Zduny, Lipowa, Śniadeckich, Chrobrego, Kwiatowa, Mazowiecka, Hetmańska and ends at Bocianowo street.

== History ==
The first documents referring to Mittelstraße date back to 1869, as an address book registers some practitioners in this lane. Furthermore, the following issues (1872, 1876) list the houses in the street, i.e. 14 dwellings.

The street appears on map of Bromberg dated 1876, but its northern part is not completed, being laid in the Brenkenhof district (today's Bocianowo).

During its existence, the thoroughfare bore the following names:

- till 1920, Mittelstraße (Middle street);
- 1920–1939, Ulica Henryka Sienkiewicza;
- 1939–1945, Fischerstraße;
- Since 1945, Ulica Henryka Sienkiewicza.

The current name refers to Henryk Adam Aleksander Pius Sienkiewicz (1846–1916), a famous Polish journalist, novelist and Nobel Prize laureate in 1905.

Within time, the house numbering in the street evolved, either to account for the extension of the axis (in the mid-1880s and in 1900) or adapt the horse shoe system to the Polish rule (in 1920).

== Main areas and edifices ==
=== Tenement at 48 Dworcowa Street, corner with Sienkiewicza street ===
1875-1900

Eclecticism

Bahnhoffstraße 74 was built in the early 1880s for Rob. Tuchscher, a pharmacist. He opened his pharmacy Kronen Apotheke there, which was one of few in the city at that time. A new pharmacist, Emil Affeldt, took over the firm at the same location from 1900 till the end of the 1920s.

The corner tenement was restored in 2018, and displays two symmetric facades with a neo-classic style and a wrought iron balcony on its corner.

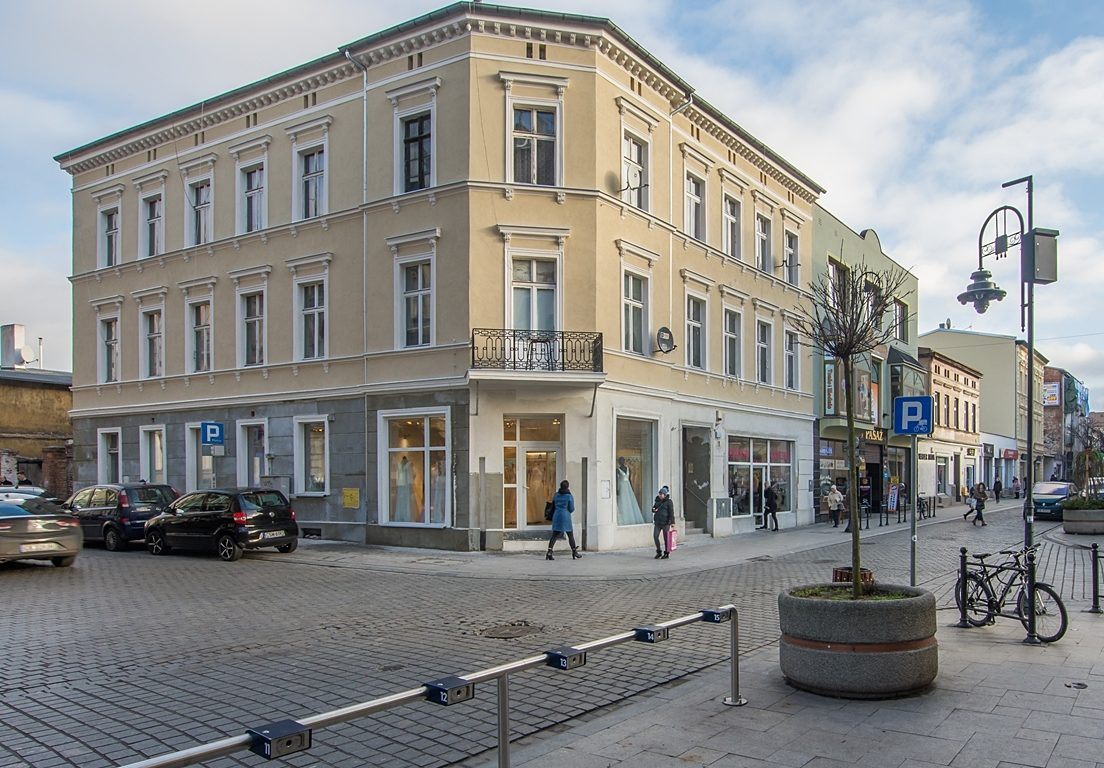
Renovated facade on Dworcowa and Sienkiewicza Streets

=== Tenement at 50 Dworcowa Street, corner with Sienkiewicza street ===
1895

Neo-Renaissance

Christian Teodor Hinß opened a coach workshop (German: Wagenfabrikant) at this location in 1880. His widow Minna lived there till the outbreak of WWI.

The building's facades display a northern Neo-Renaissance style with elaborate ornament and scrollwork (on pediments, cartouches), balustrades, pinnacles, together with stone blocks imitation, bay windows and a mansard roof.

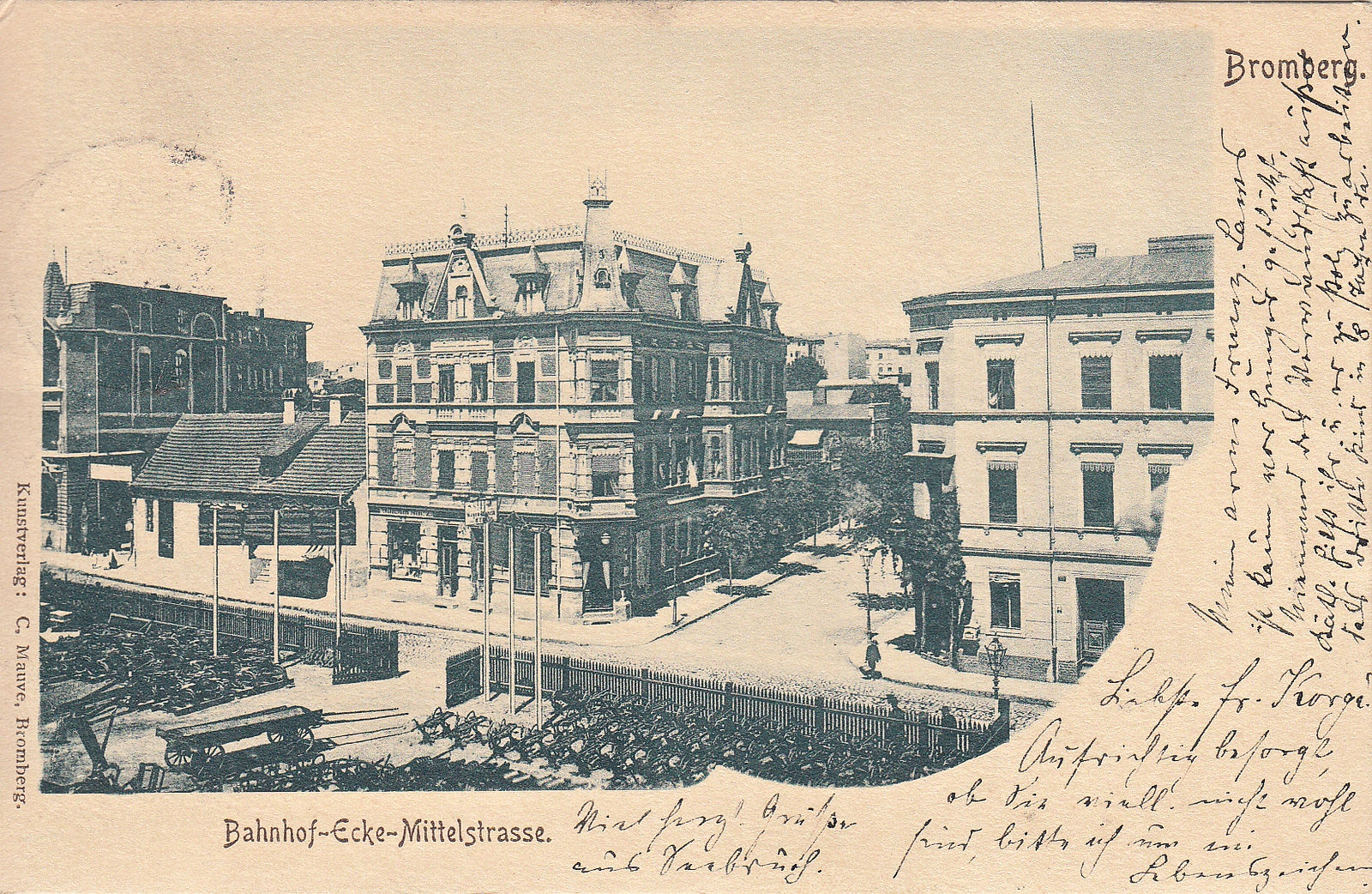
1900 postcard view

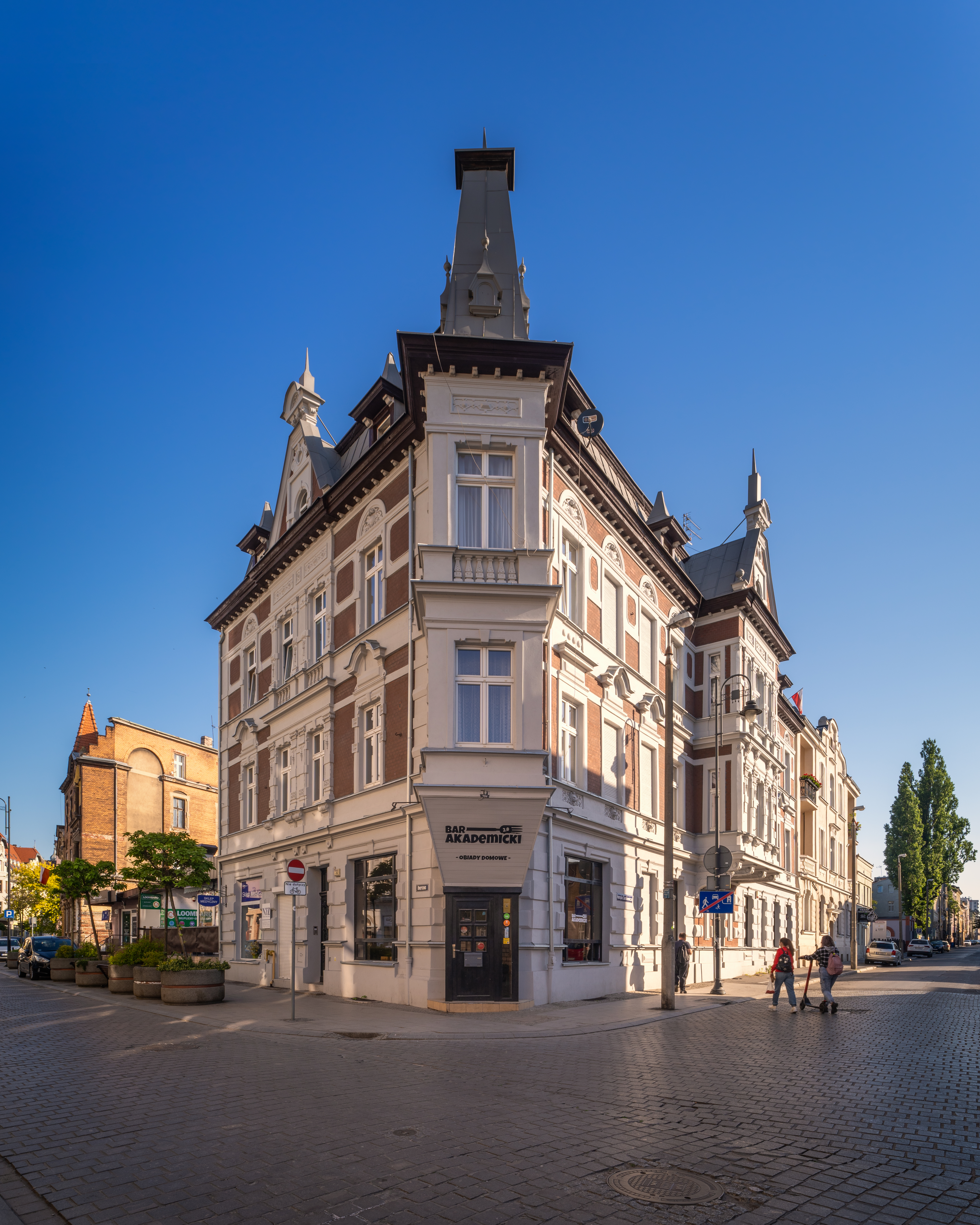
Facades on Dworcowa and Sienkiewicza Streets

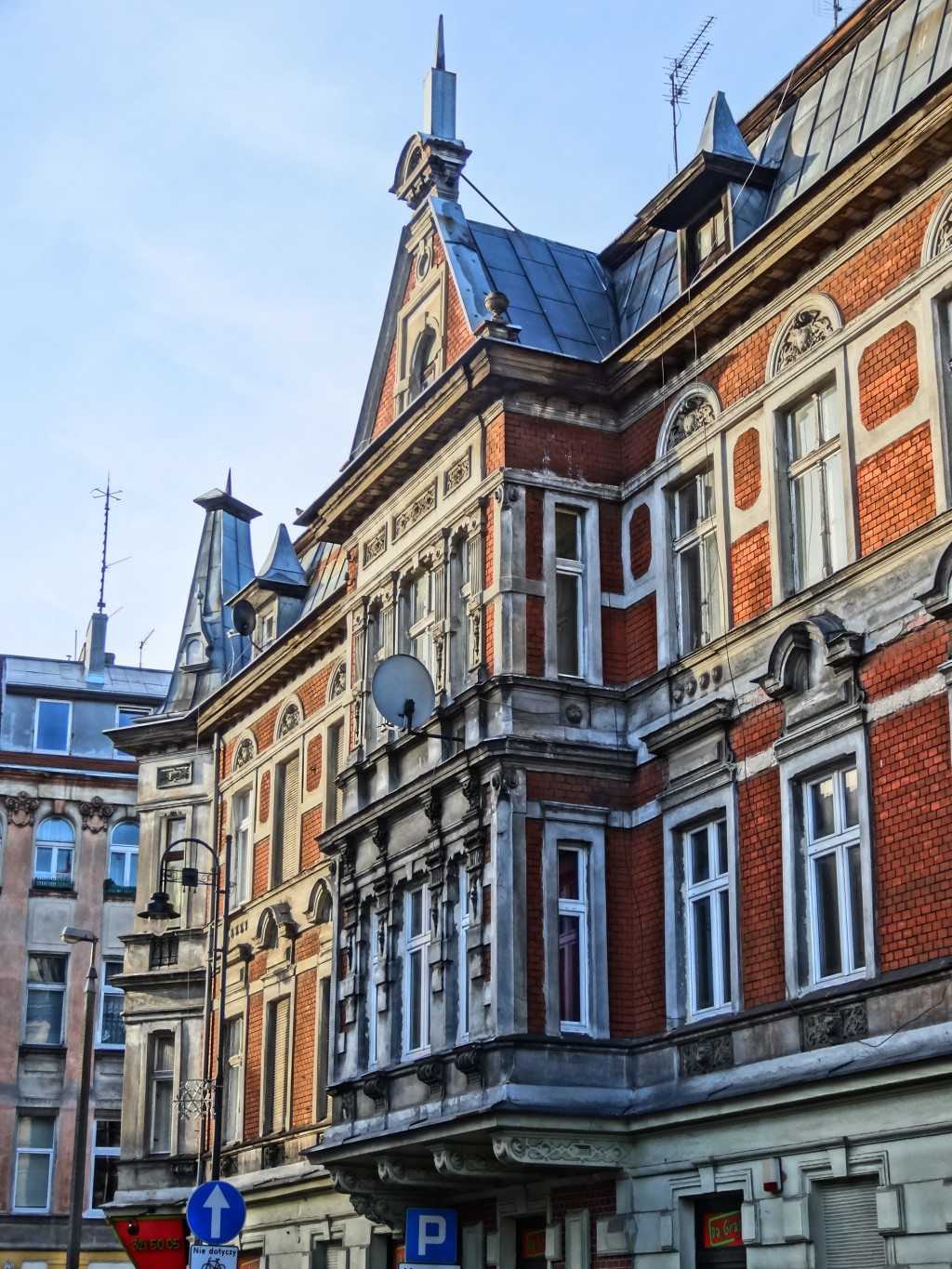
Facade on Sienkiewicza Street

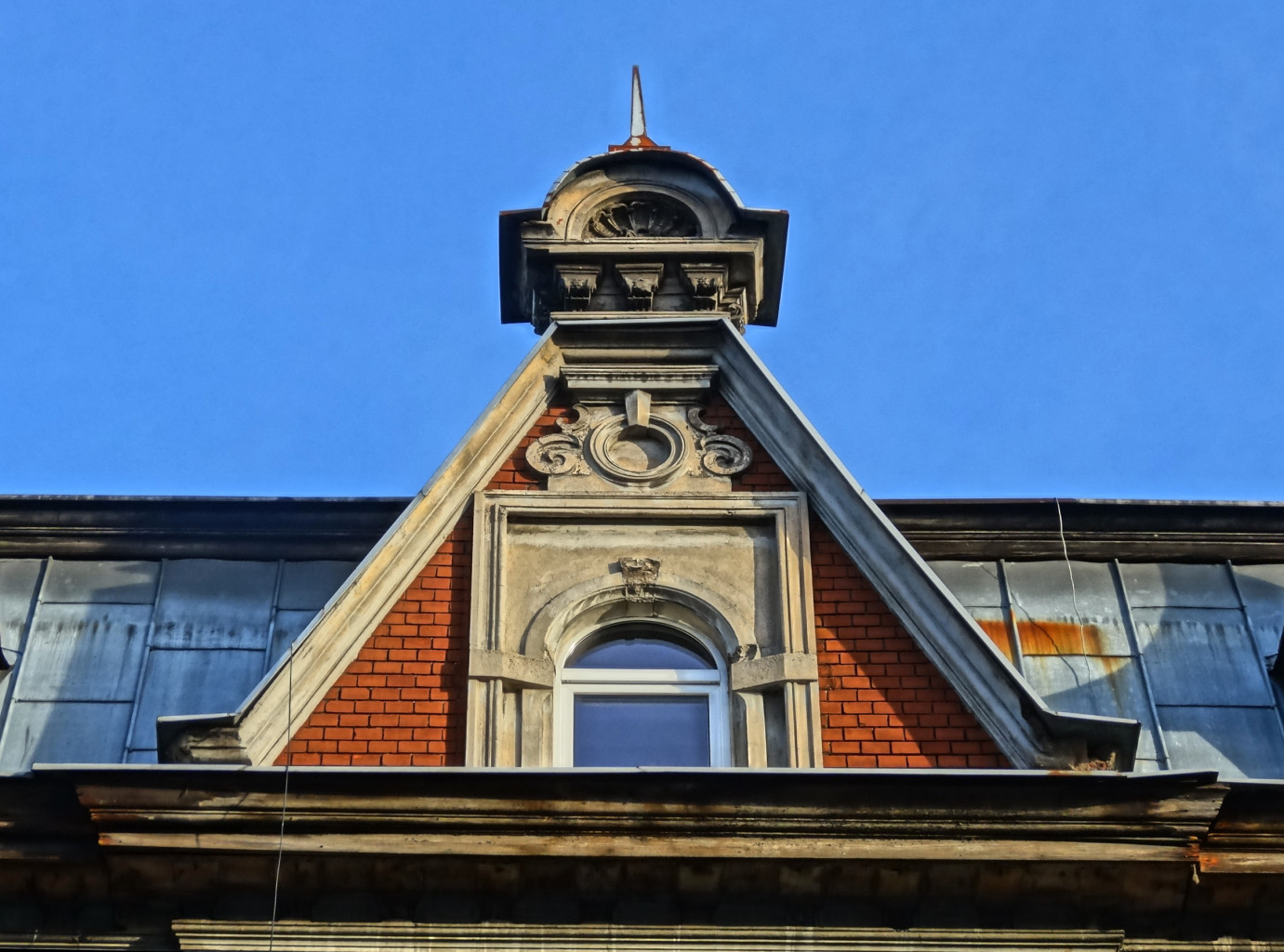
Gable dormer

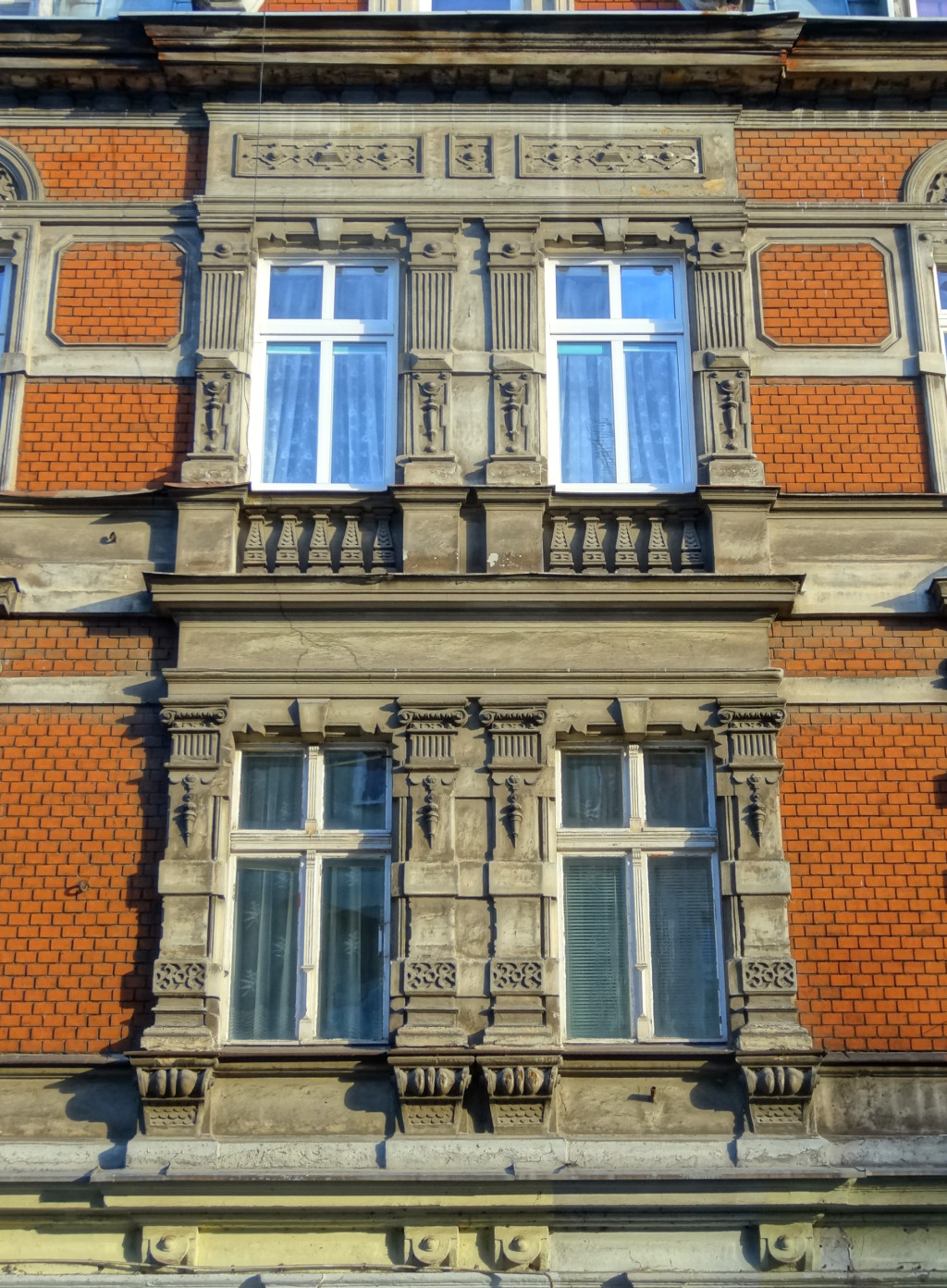
Windows decoration

=== Tenement at 1 ===
1912

Art Nouveau

This tenement, erected in 1890, was revamped in the early 1910s. At that time, Minna Hinß, the widow of Teodor, was the landlord and lived at the corner of Dworcowa (then Banhoffstraße).

Renovated in 2017, the facade displays some Art Nouveau motifs, such as a mascaron on the lintel of a first floor window. In addition, preserved elements are visible on the ground floor, where both carved wooden doors exhibit transom light, adorned in one case with stained glass.

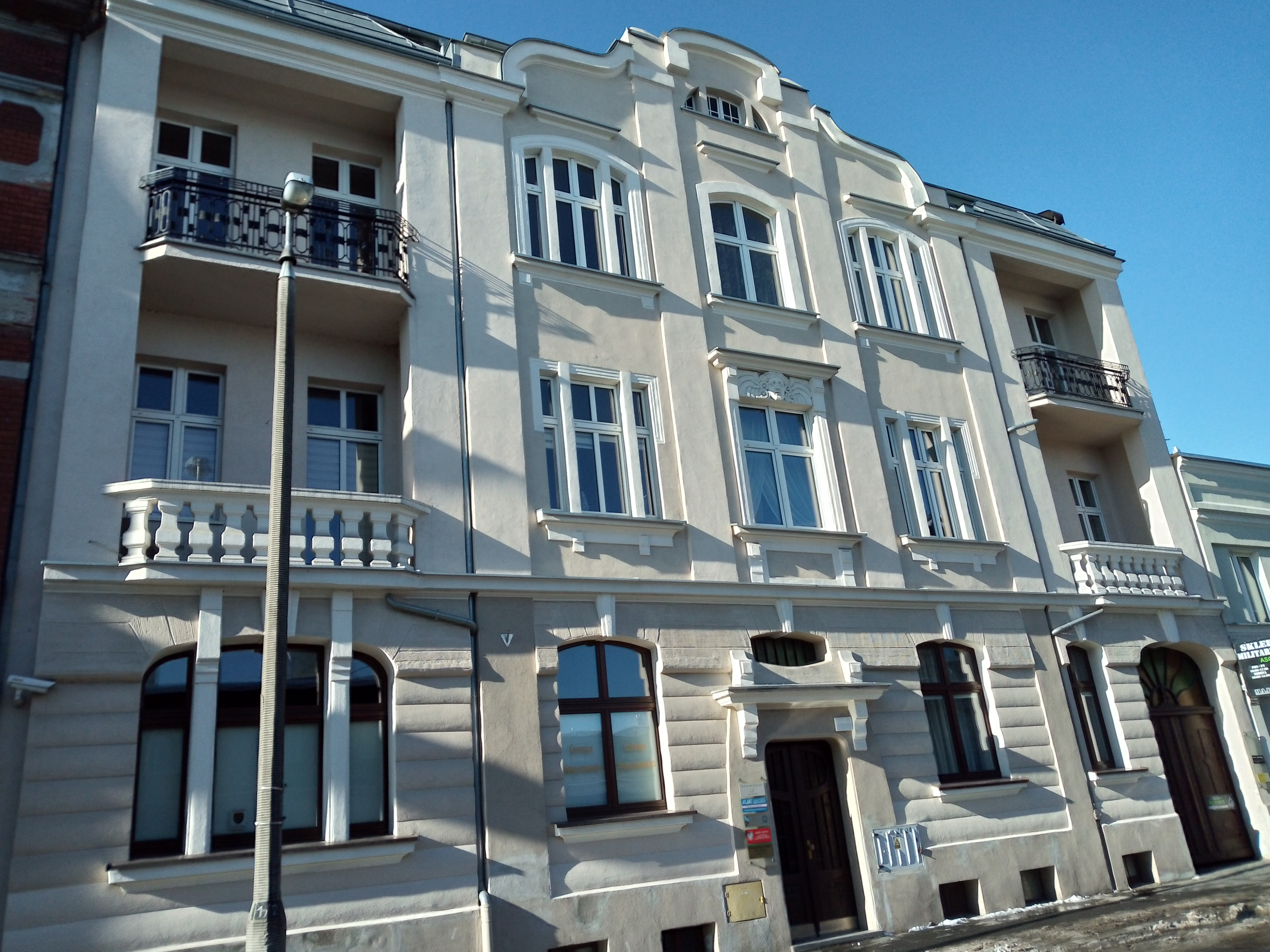
Main elevation

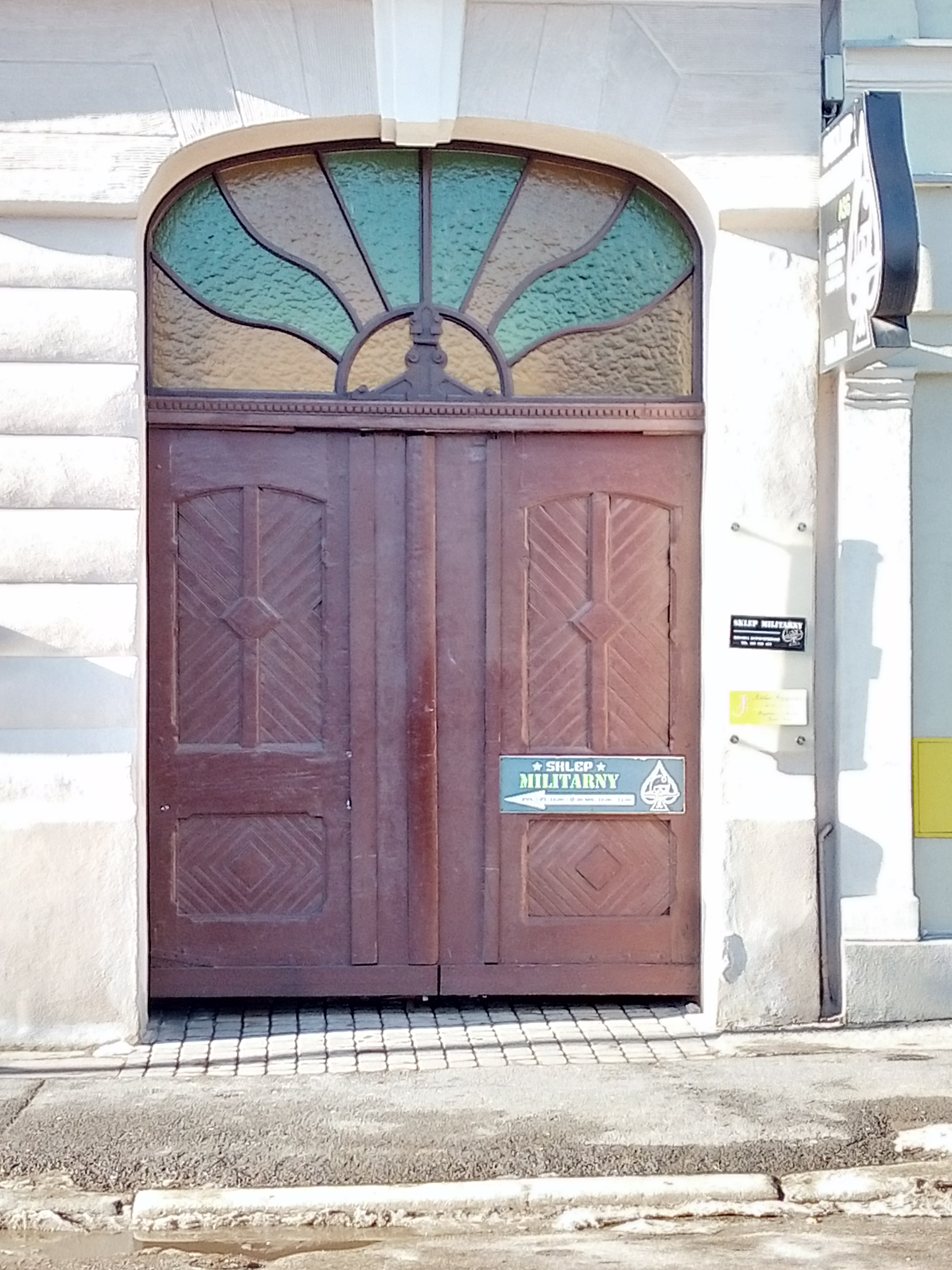
Main entrance

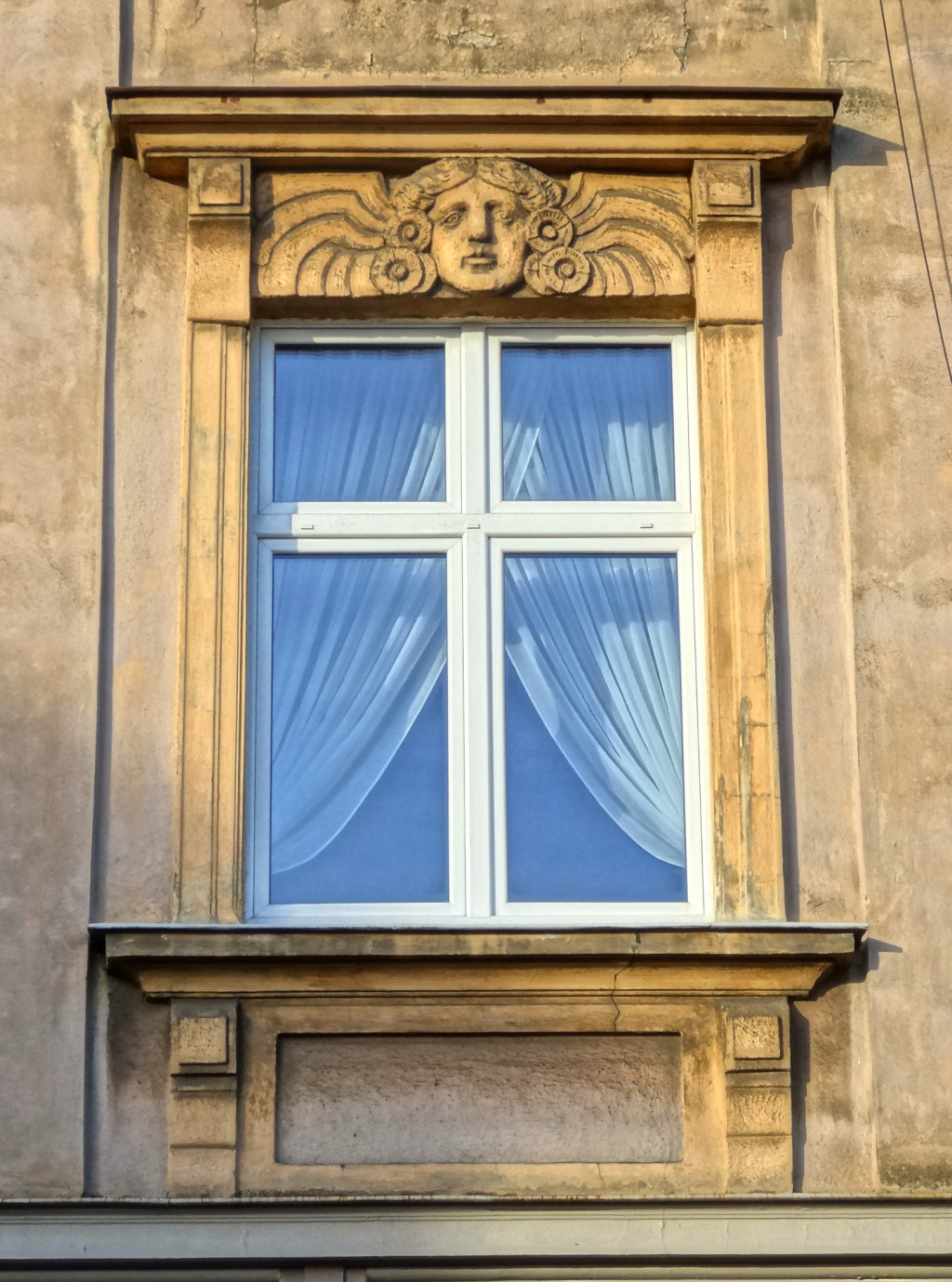
Windows decoration

=== Building at 3 ===
1885

Warehouse

This edifice was used for storage purposes, in particular after 1920, when it served as a granary for the firm "RAWA" till the start of WWII. Today, it houses a shop of metal and non-metal tools.

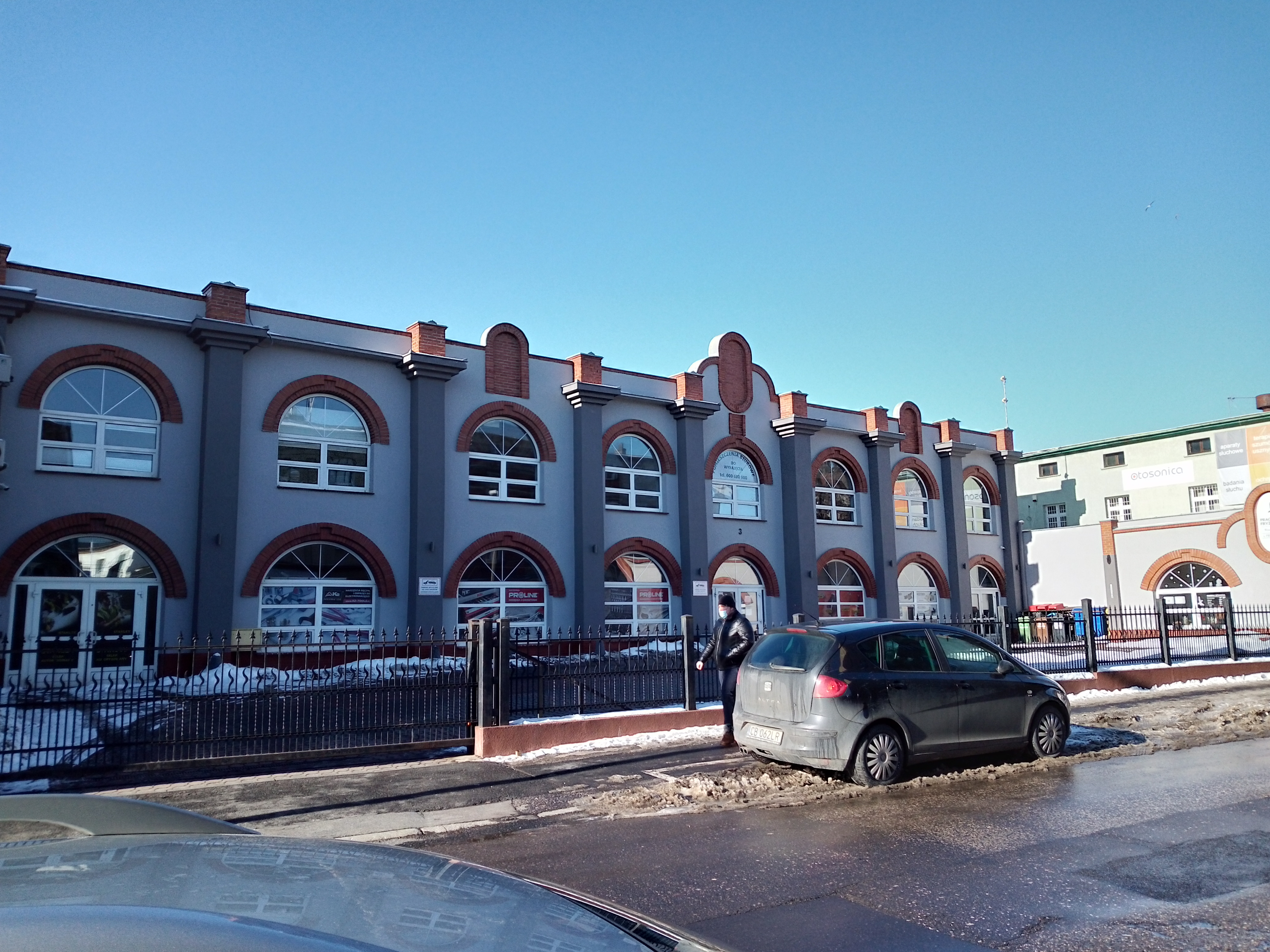
Main building

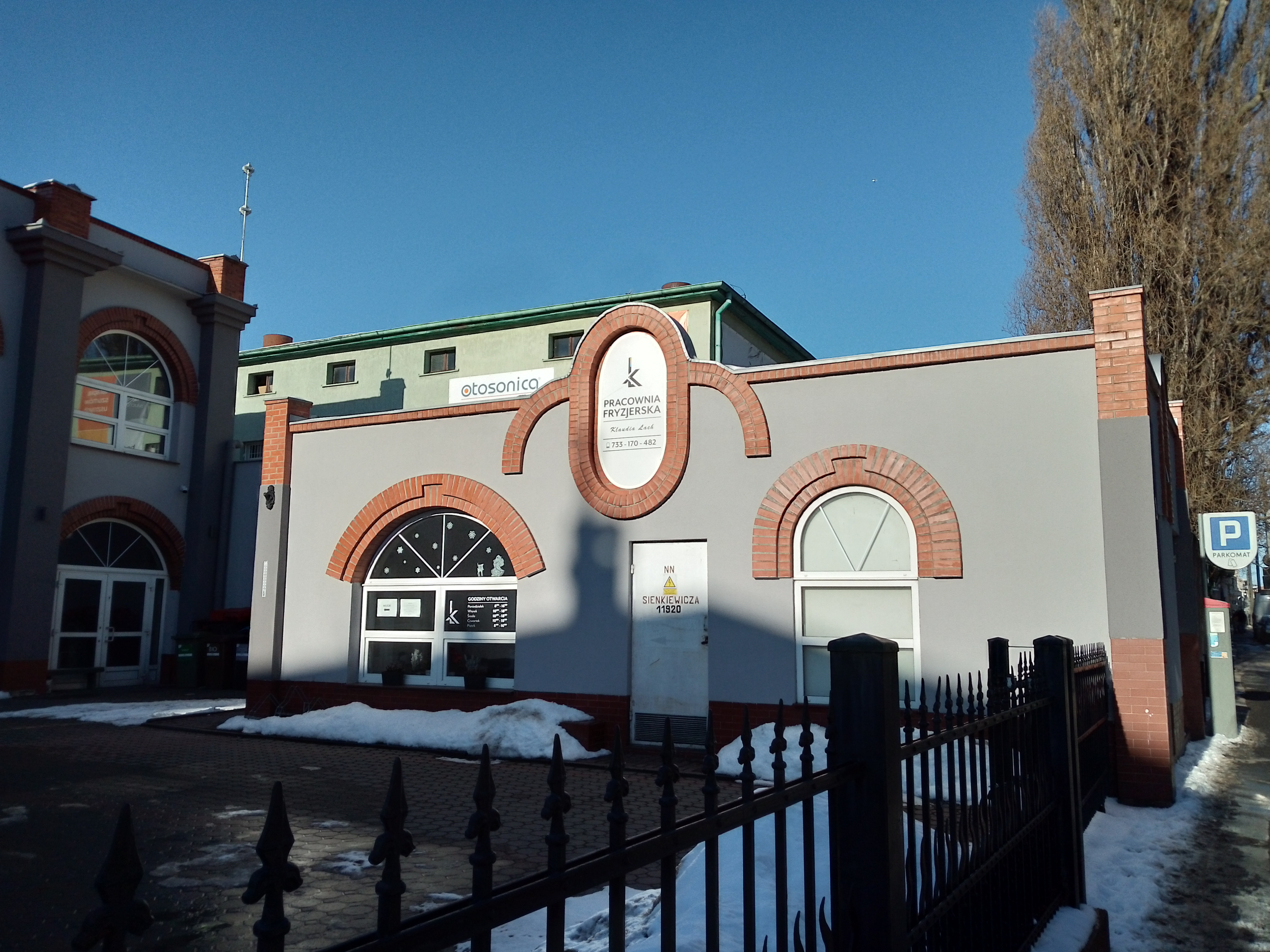
Side building

=== Tenement at 4 ===
1910

Early Modern architecture

After a long period during which its plot remained a garden, this tenement was commissioned by Eugen Steinborn, a master locksmith.

From 1920 to 1929, the site housed a joint US-Polish company, AMPOL, which produced incandescent light bulbs. The firm had been established by Polish emigrants to the US, Stefan Daszewski and Rafał Kukliński.

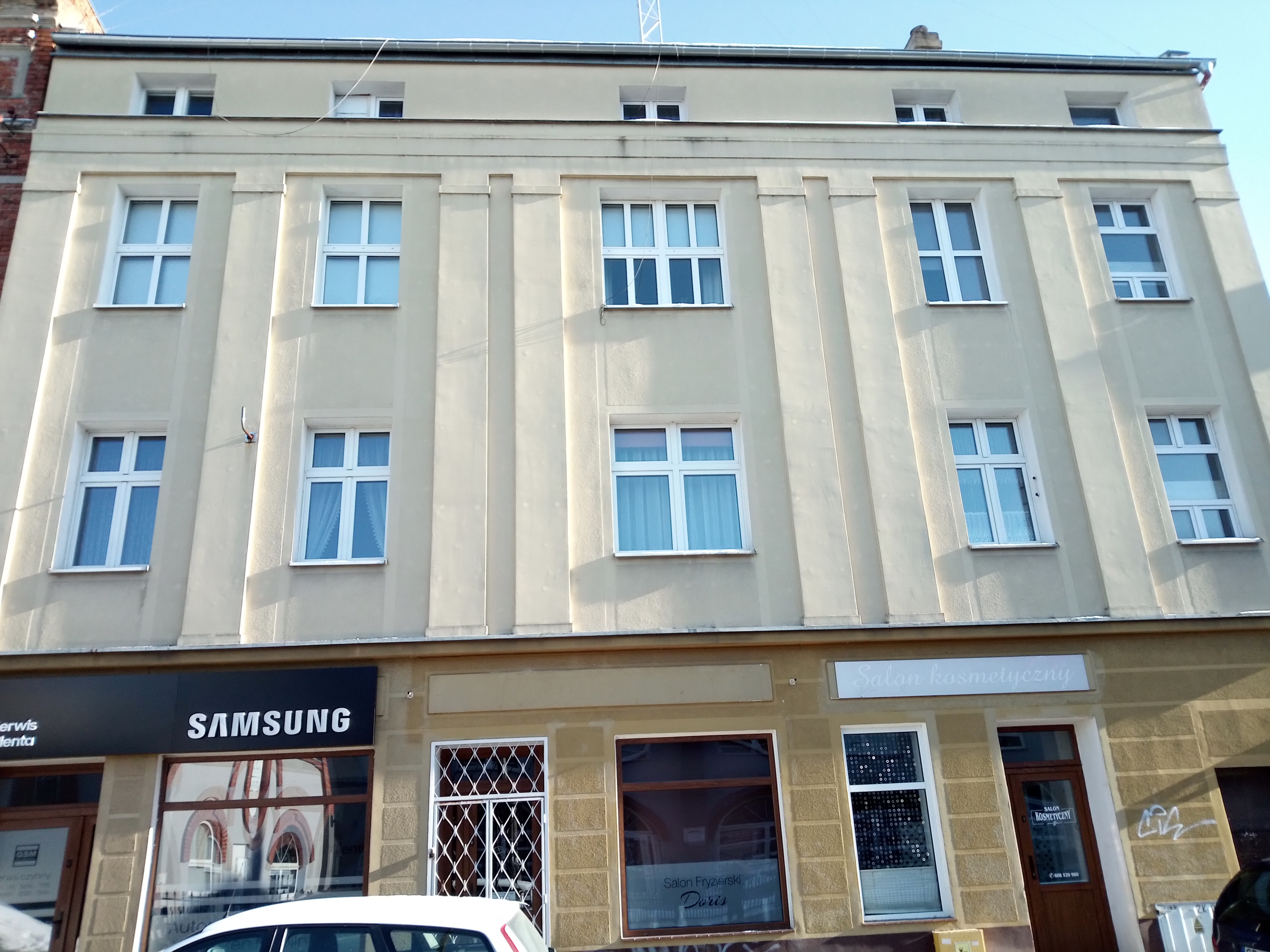
Main elevation

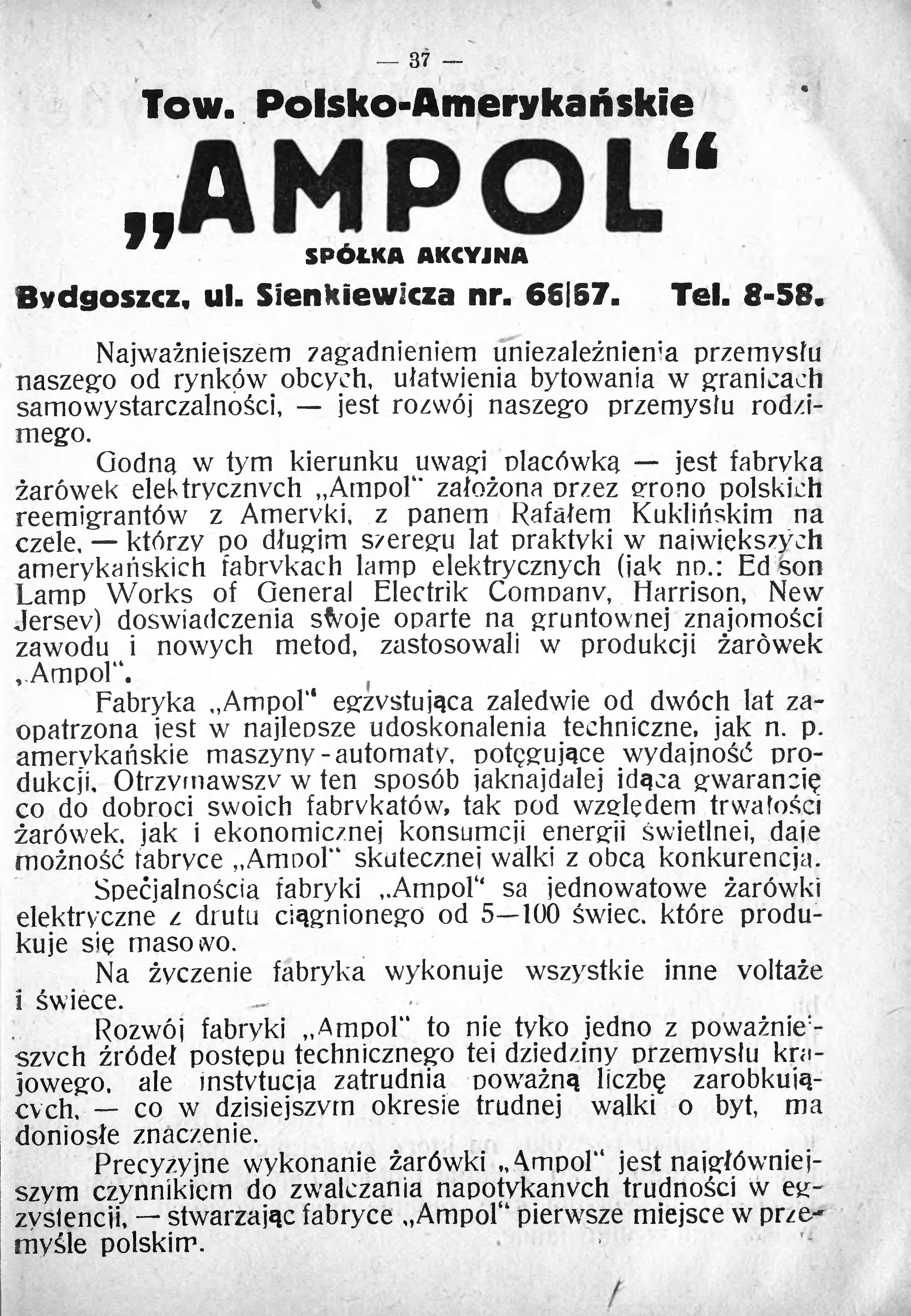
Article about "AMPOL", 1924

=== Plot at 5 ===
1870s

This plot was one of the first where an edifice was erected in the early 1870s. For several decades until the First World War began, a furniture factory established by Julius Grünenwald stood at this address (then 3 Mittelstraße). In the 1960s and 1970s, the area hosted a pharmaceutic drug factory.

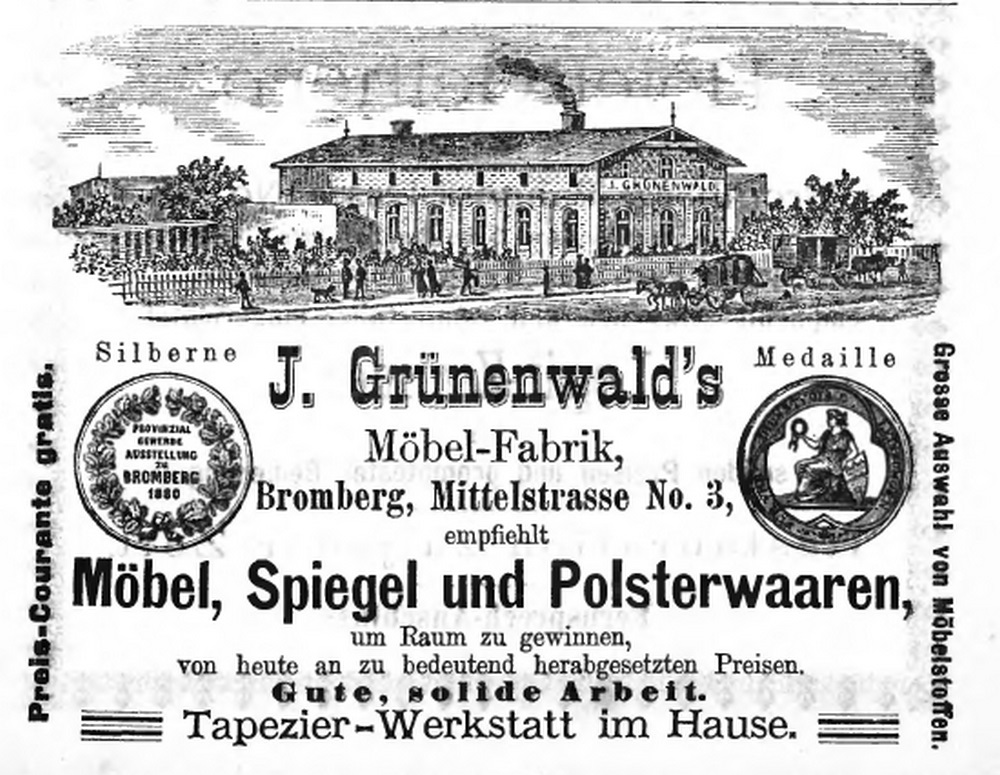
Advertising for the Grünenwald factory, ca 1888

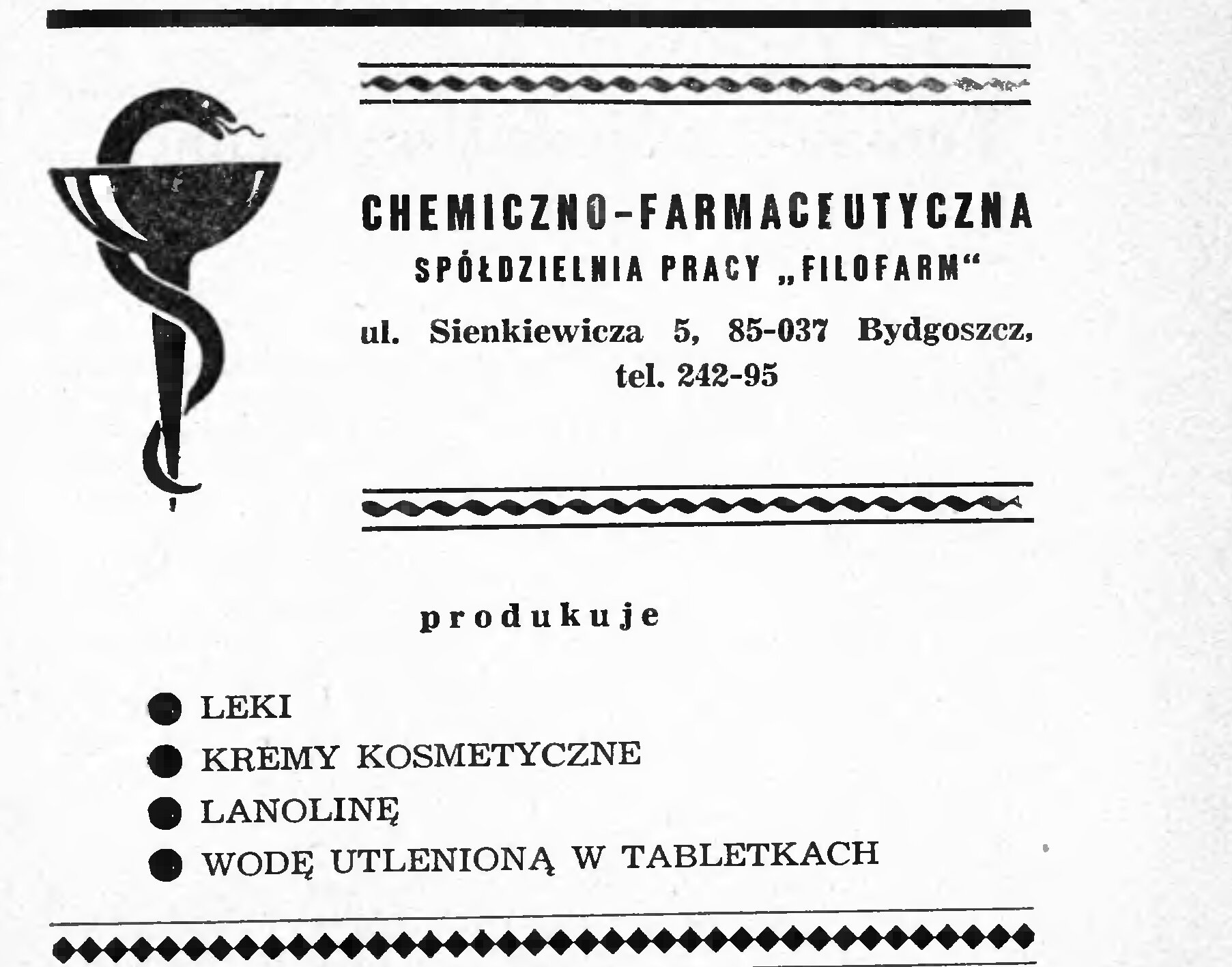
Advertising for the drug factory in 1975

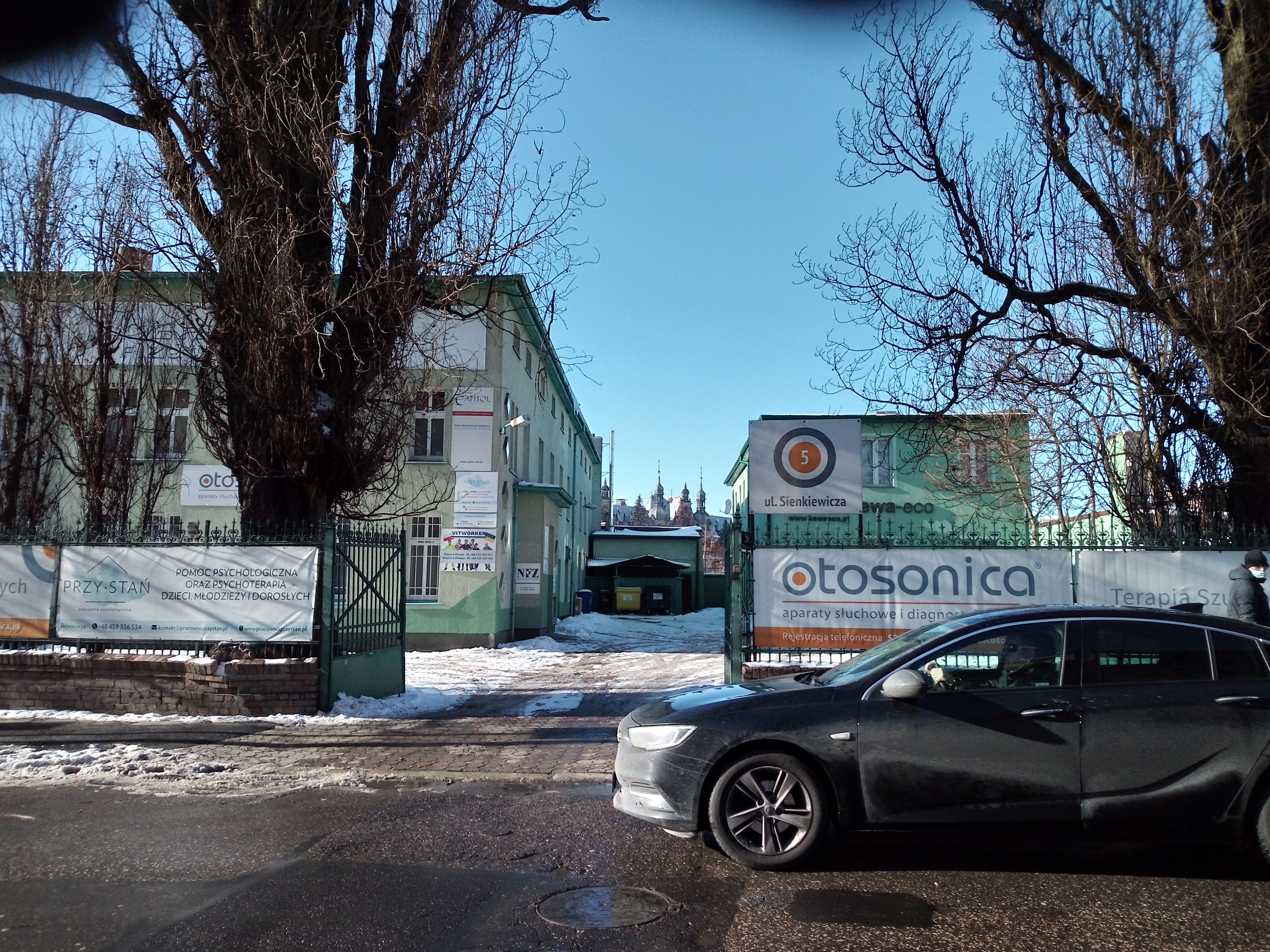
The site today

=== Tenement at 6, corner with Podolska street ===
1900s

Eclecticism

Carl Schultz, the first owner of this tenement, ran a restaurant from the location until the early 1930s.

The now-deteriorated building still displays decorated window sills, lesenes on the sides, garnished lintels, and transom lighted entrance doors. Both facades now possess empty niches where they once held statues.

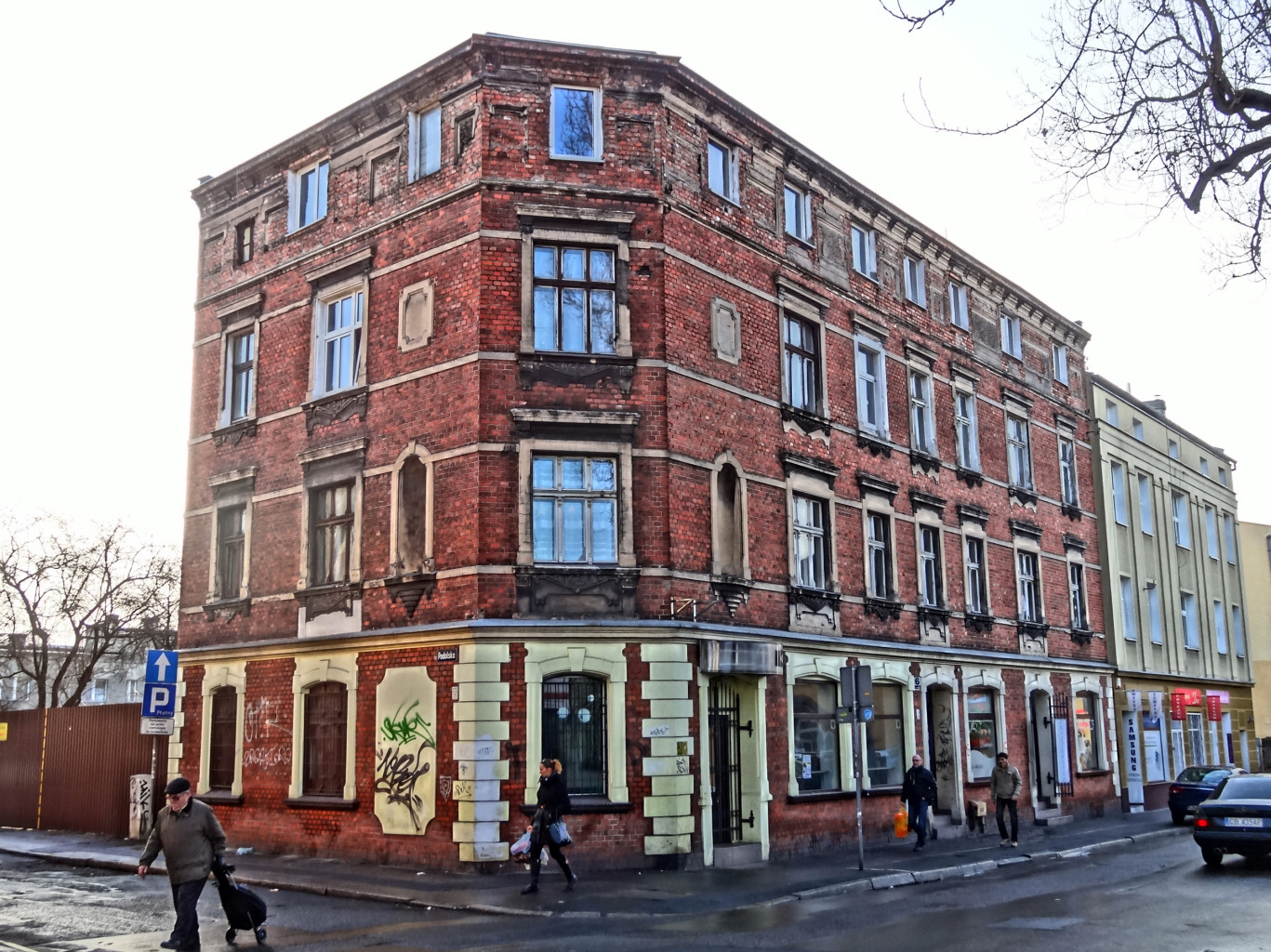
Corner view

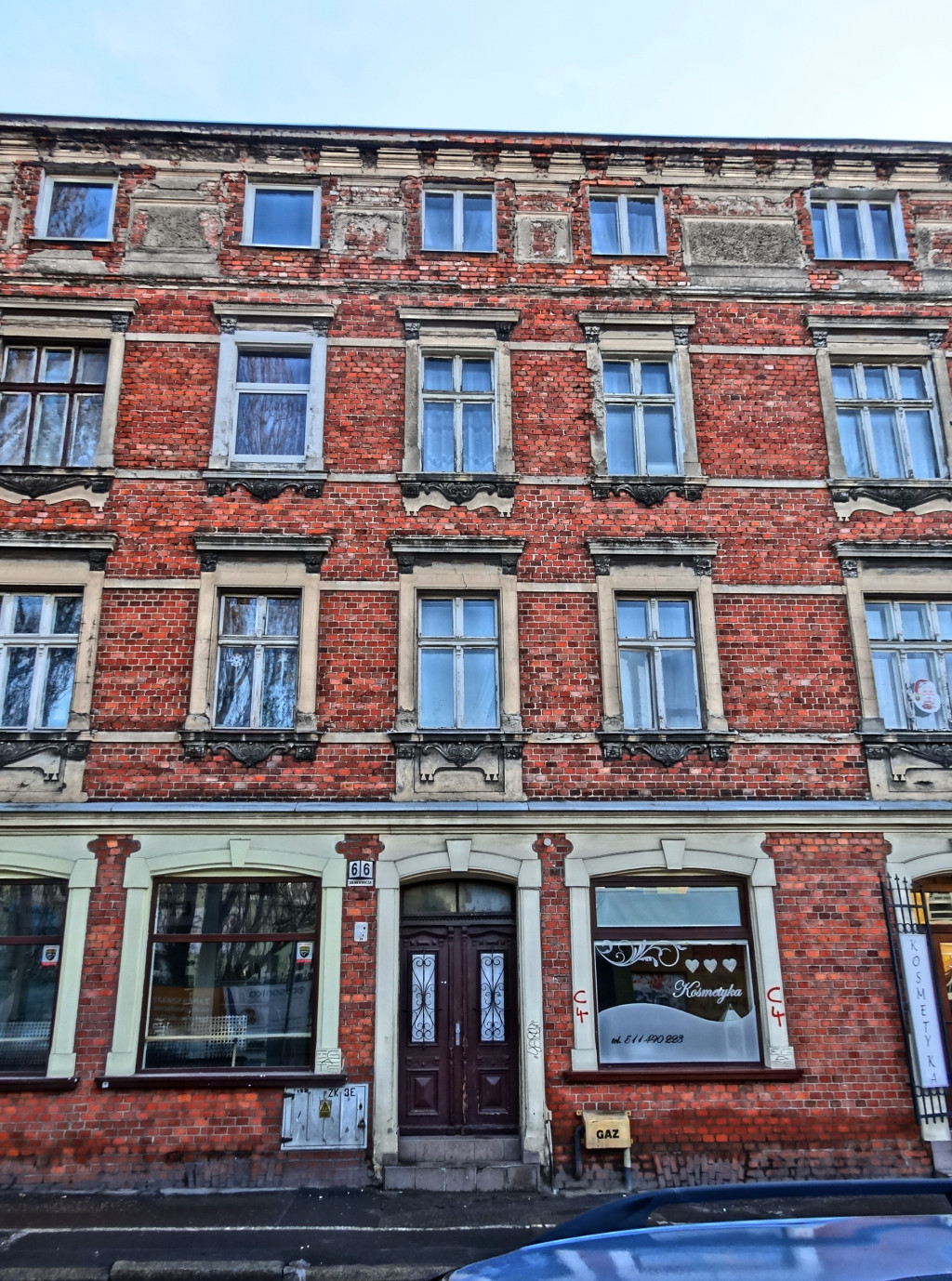
Frontage on Sienkiewicza street

=== Tenements at 7/7a ===
1880s and 1900

Eclecticism

The first building erected here in the early 1880s was registered with only one street number. At the time, the landlord was Hermann Klessen (or Kleßen).

At the turn of the 20th century, this plot was recorded as two separate houses, "4 and 4a Mittelstraße": these had the same owner, Carl Kästner, a railway administrative assistant, who inhabited 4a (present day 7a).

In terms of frontages, the present day 7a building maintained better architectural motifs than its neighbour (floral design cartouches and adorned lintel). The house at 7, however, still boasts an original wrought iron fencing and a wood awning at the side entrance.

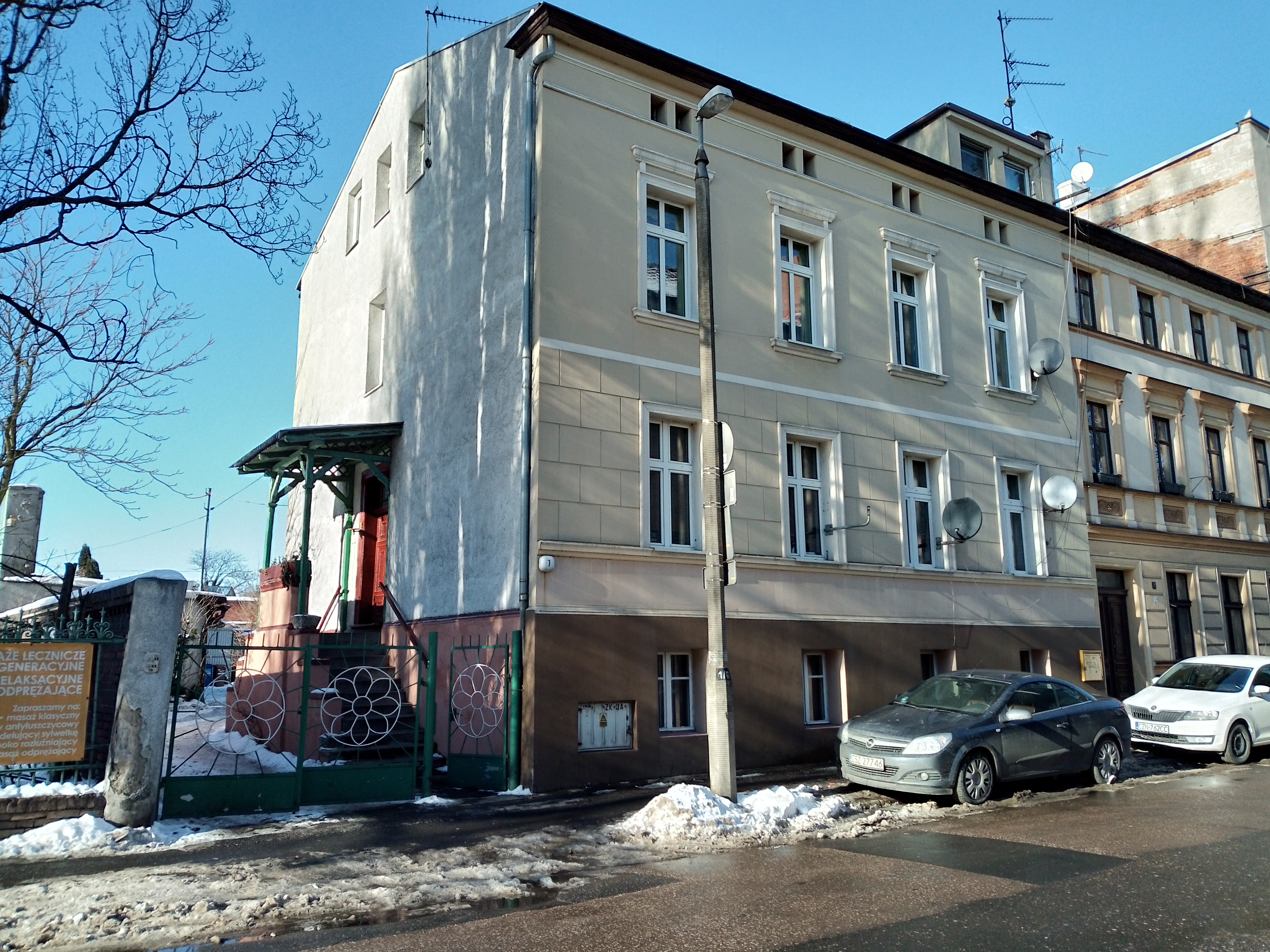
Tenement at 7

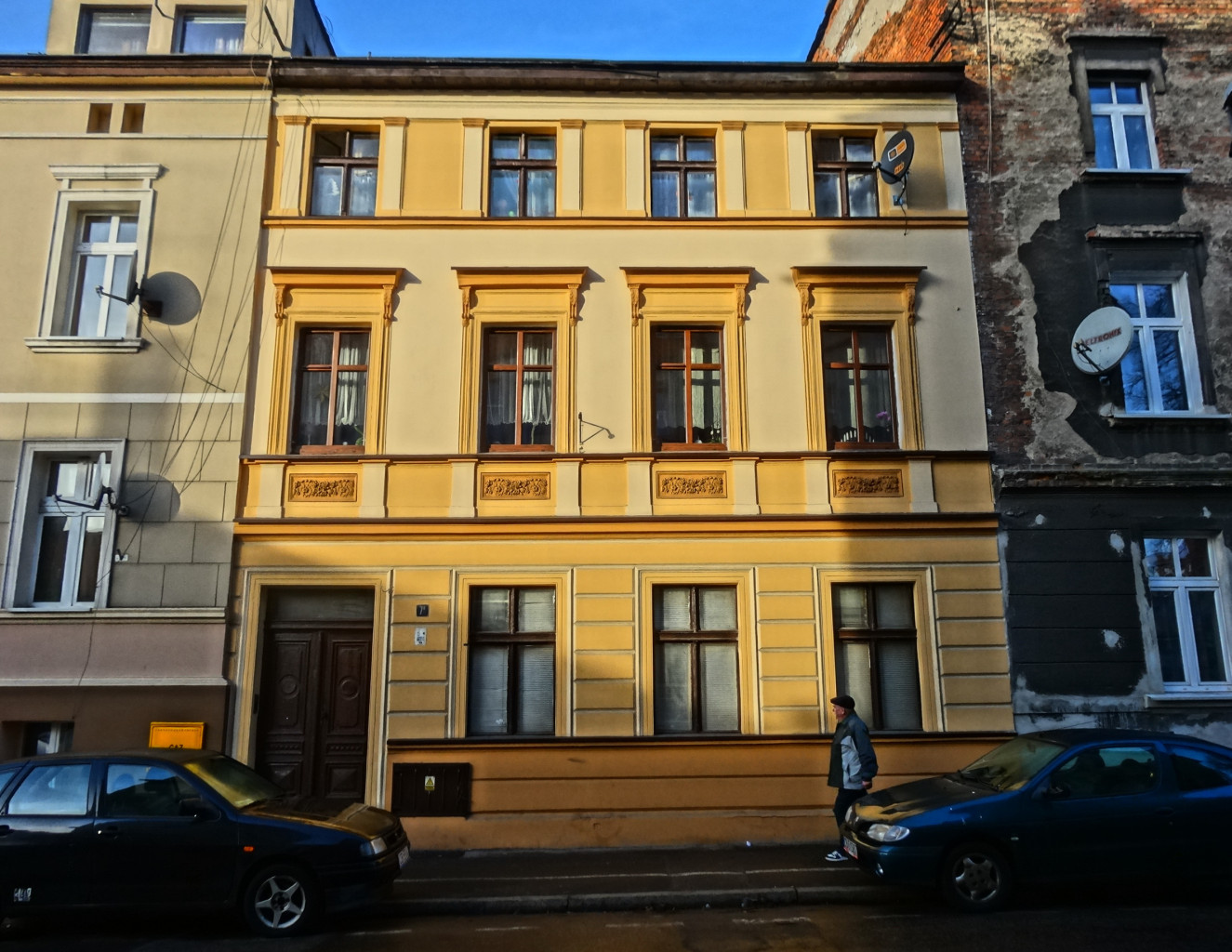
Frontage at 7a

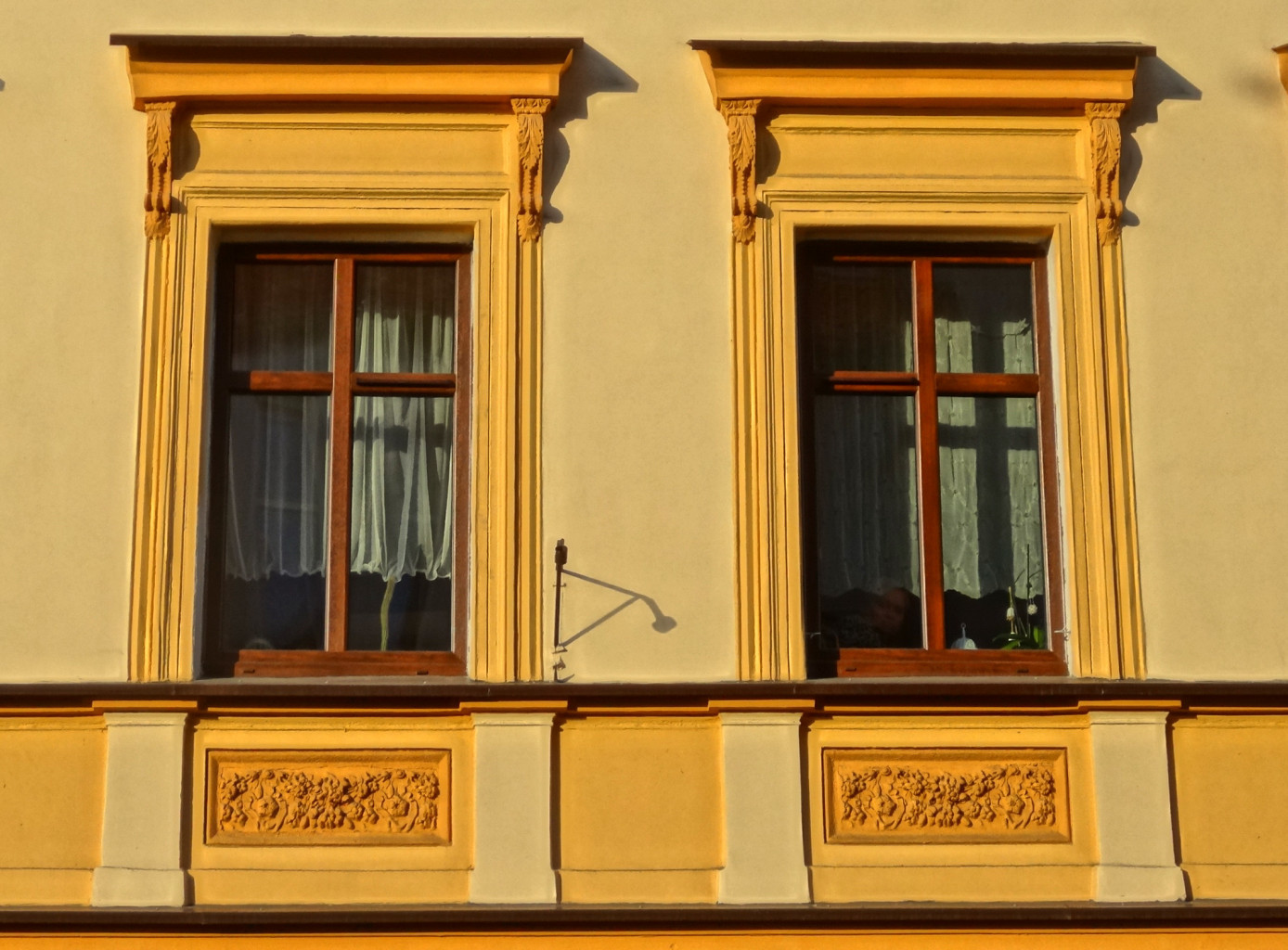
Details of the window ornament

=== Tenement at 9 ===
1890s

Eclecticism

This house and the neighbouring one at 11 were owned by Amalie Grundtmann, a rentier. She was listed as owner of this building till the end of the 19th century.

The building was renovated in 2020.

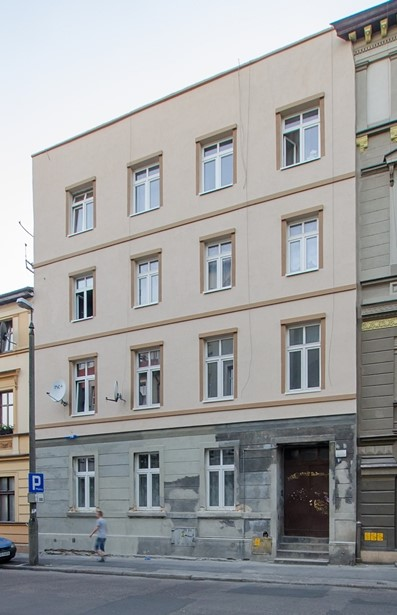
Frontage at Nr.9

=== Tenement at 10, corner with Zduny street ===
1910

Early Modern architecture, German Historicism

This building's previous edifice from the 19th century was rebuilt in the early 1910s by its new owner, Franz Salewski, a plumber.

The tenement presents some hints of historicist style, especially in the round shaped bay windows on both facades combined with the upper wooden loggia on Zduny frontage.

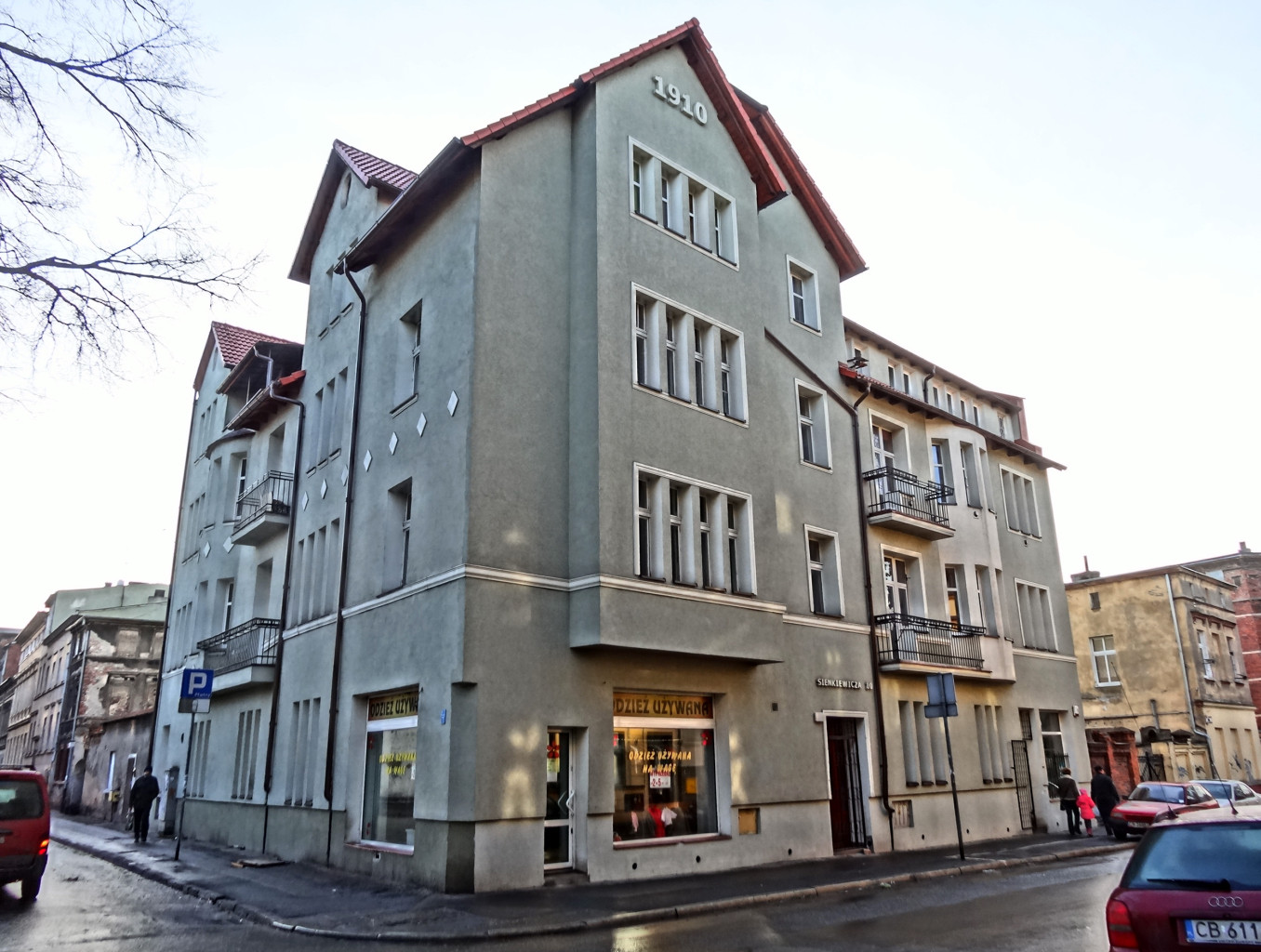
Corner view

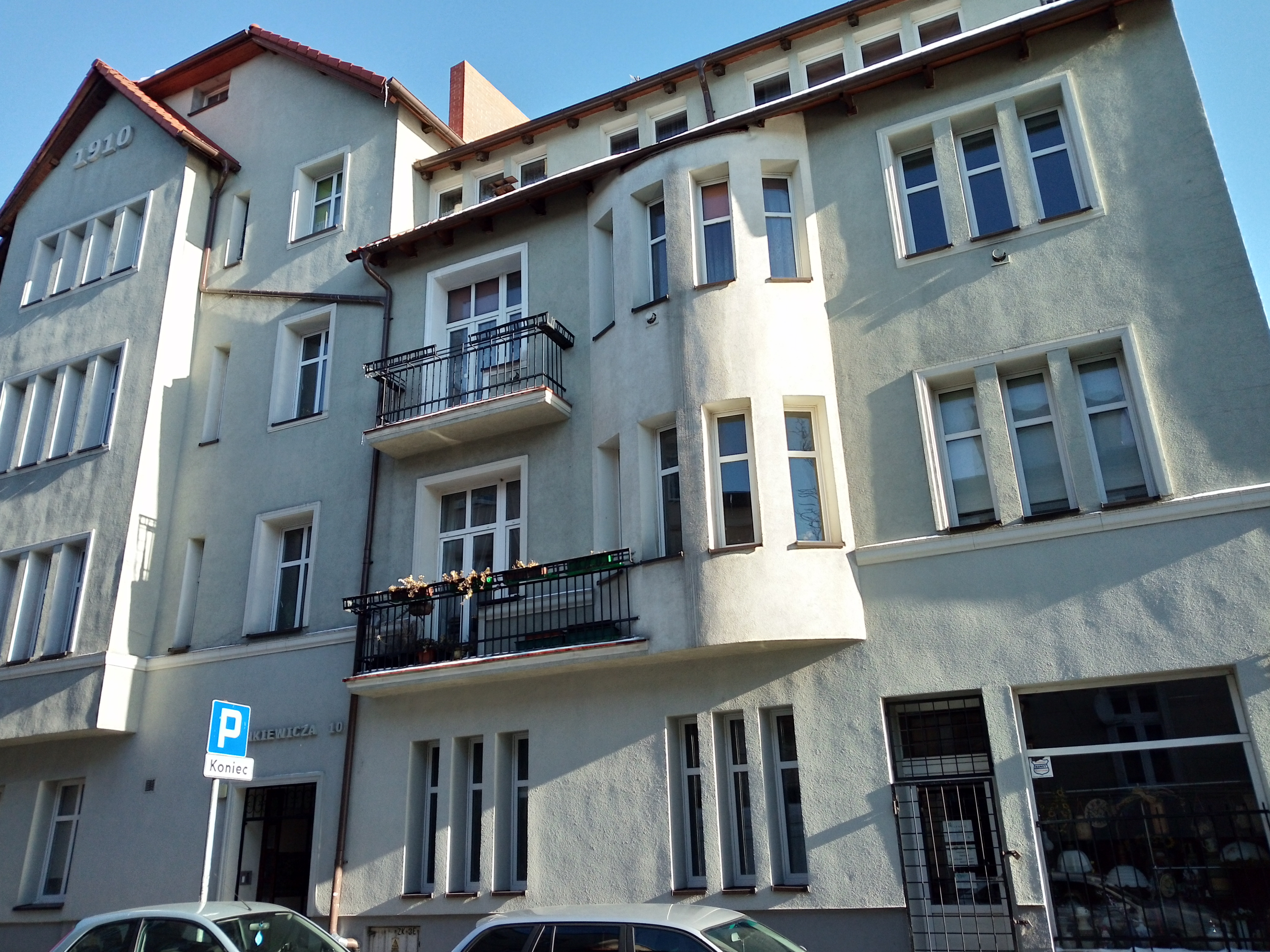
Elevation on Sienkiewicza street

=== Building at 10a, corner with Zduny street ===
Post WWII

This area remained unbuilt during most of the street's history of development. Registered at "62 Mittelstraße", it was mentioned during the interwar as a "building site", before hosting a wine shop. In the 1960s, a confectionery, MALTA, was set up there, but was replaced after 1995 by a clothing shop. Today, the site hosts a bakery run by Rafał Przybylski.

The plot preserved its tall workshop chimney in the backyard.

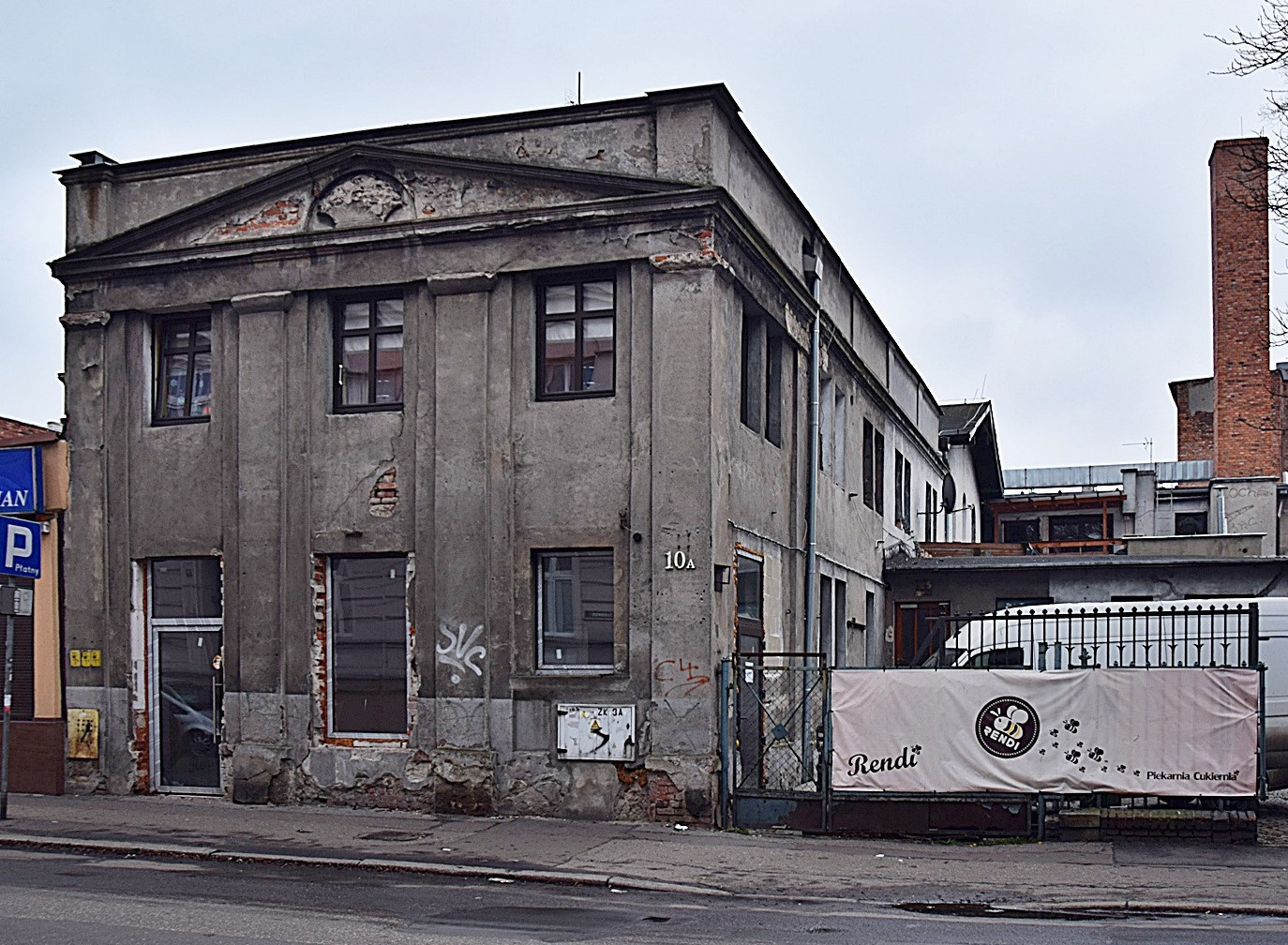
View from the street

=== Grundtmann's tenement at 11, corner with Lipowa street ===
1890s

Eclecticism

This building had Emmy Grundtmann, a rentier, as its initial landlord. She also owned the neighbouring building at 9. Emmy Grundtmann, née Hempel, was living at the time at "56 Wilhemstraße" (today nonexistent, at the corner of Jagiellońska and Bernardyńska streets). At the turn of the 20th century, the tenement was purchased by Albin Cohnfeld, sitting at "22 Bahoffstraße" (50 Dworcowa Street).

In the aftermath of WWI, the building sheltered orphan boys (grades I-III) from the Eastern Borderlands, while older students where housed at 20 Gdańska street. These children were all gathered in March 1921 to the city orphanage at 32 Chodkiewicza street.

After its restoration, the tenement exhibits bossage design, a double frieze running on both frontages, pediments on second floor windows and lesenes flanking openings on the upper floor. It features a series of eaves on the top levels, as well as a super wrought iron entrance door featuring rosettes, flowers and a dragon-shaped handle.

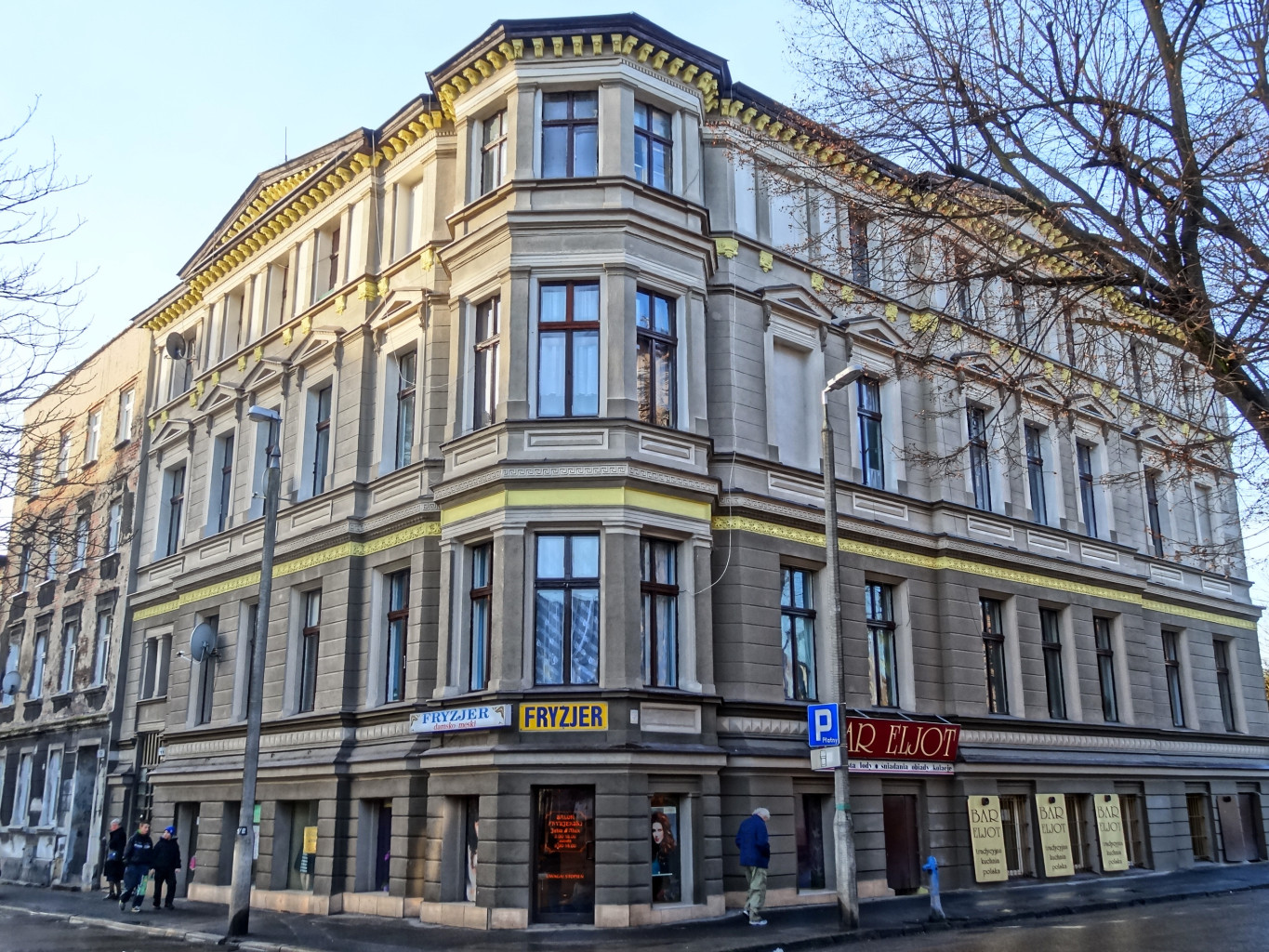
Corner view

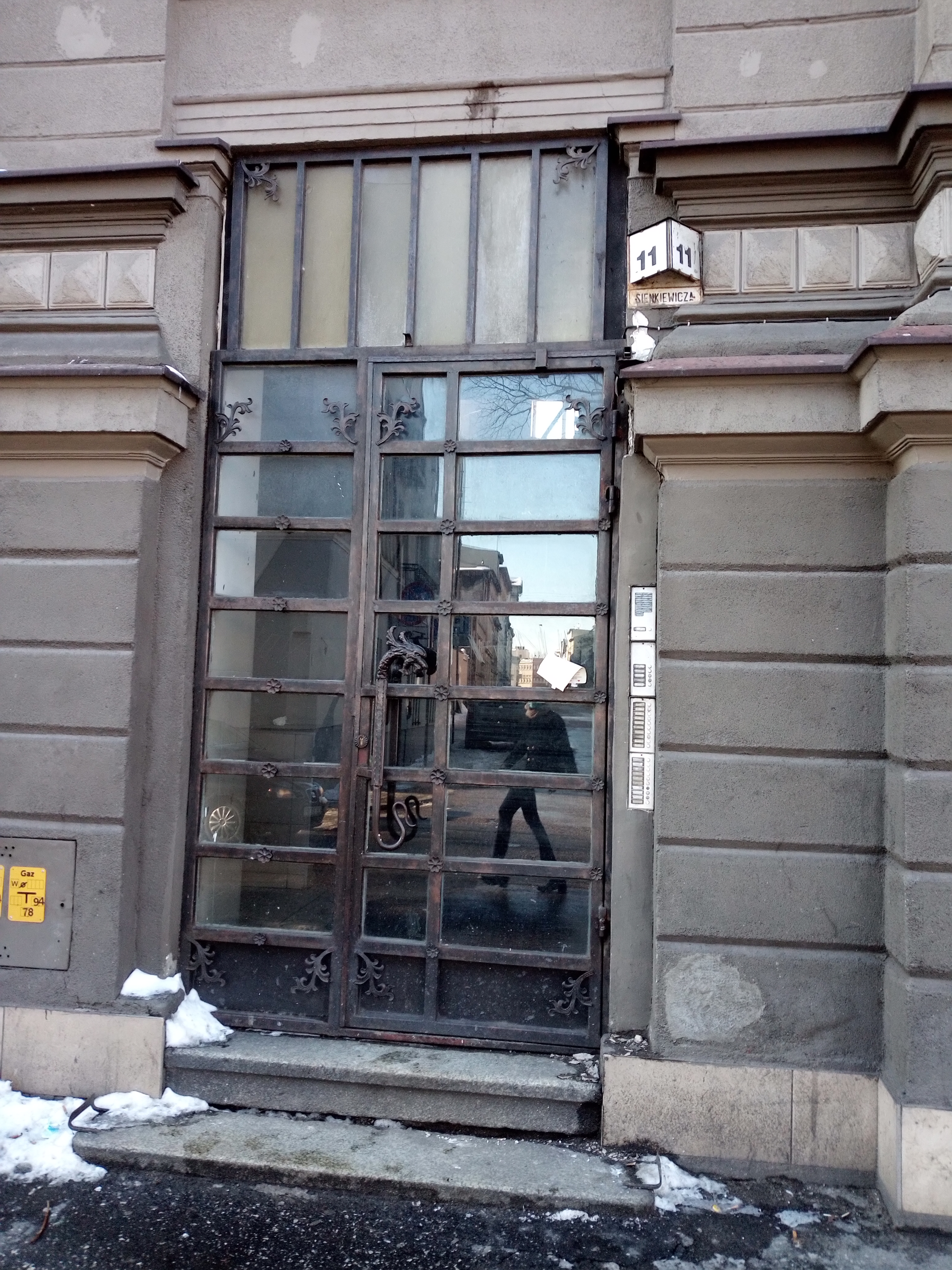
Wrought iron crafted door

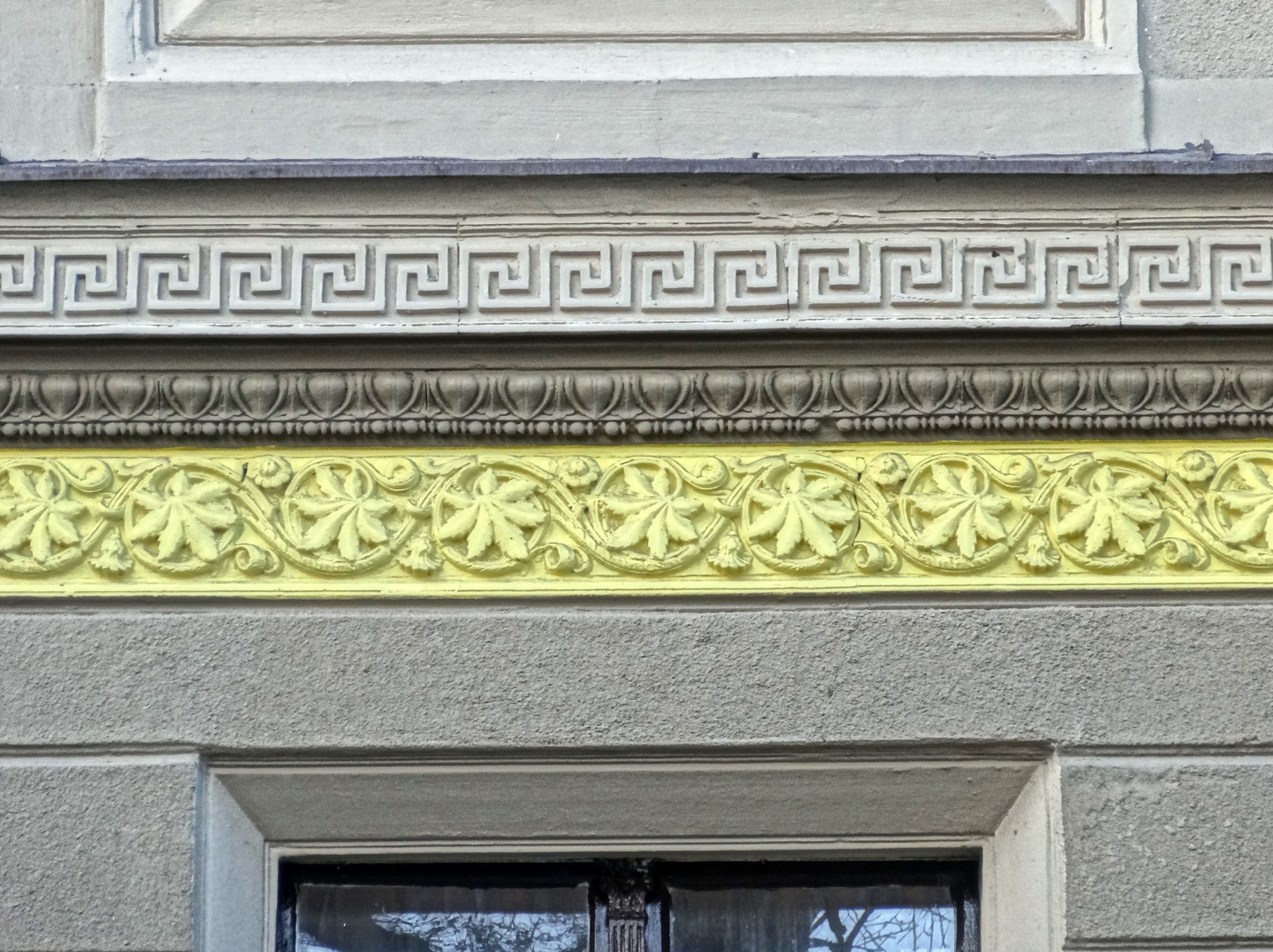
Frieze detail

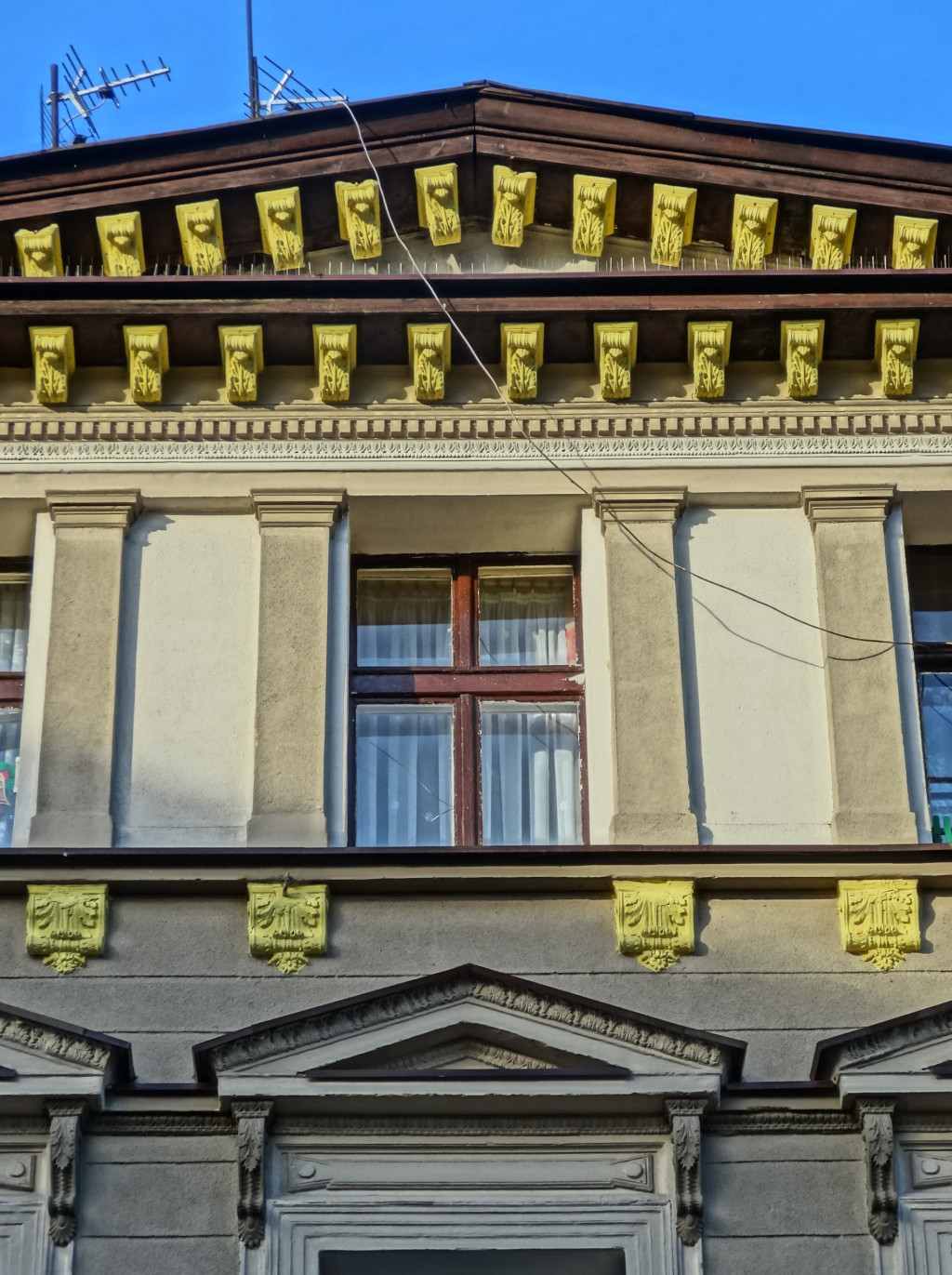
Eaves detail

=== Kayser's villa at 12 ===
1860s

Eclecticism

This house is one of the first edifices built on the street. Previously located at "61 Mittelstraße", it was the property of Robert Kayser, a paymaster. The villa changed addresses four times, thanks to the successive house numbering rules from its erection until the Second World War.

The façade is unfortunately not well-preserved. However, the quality of the original wrought iron fencing is preserved, portraying curved and floral motifs.

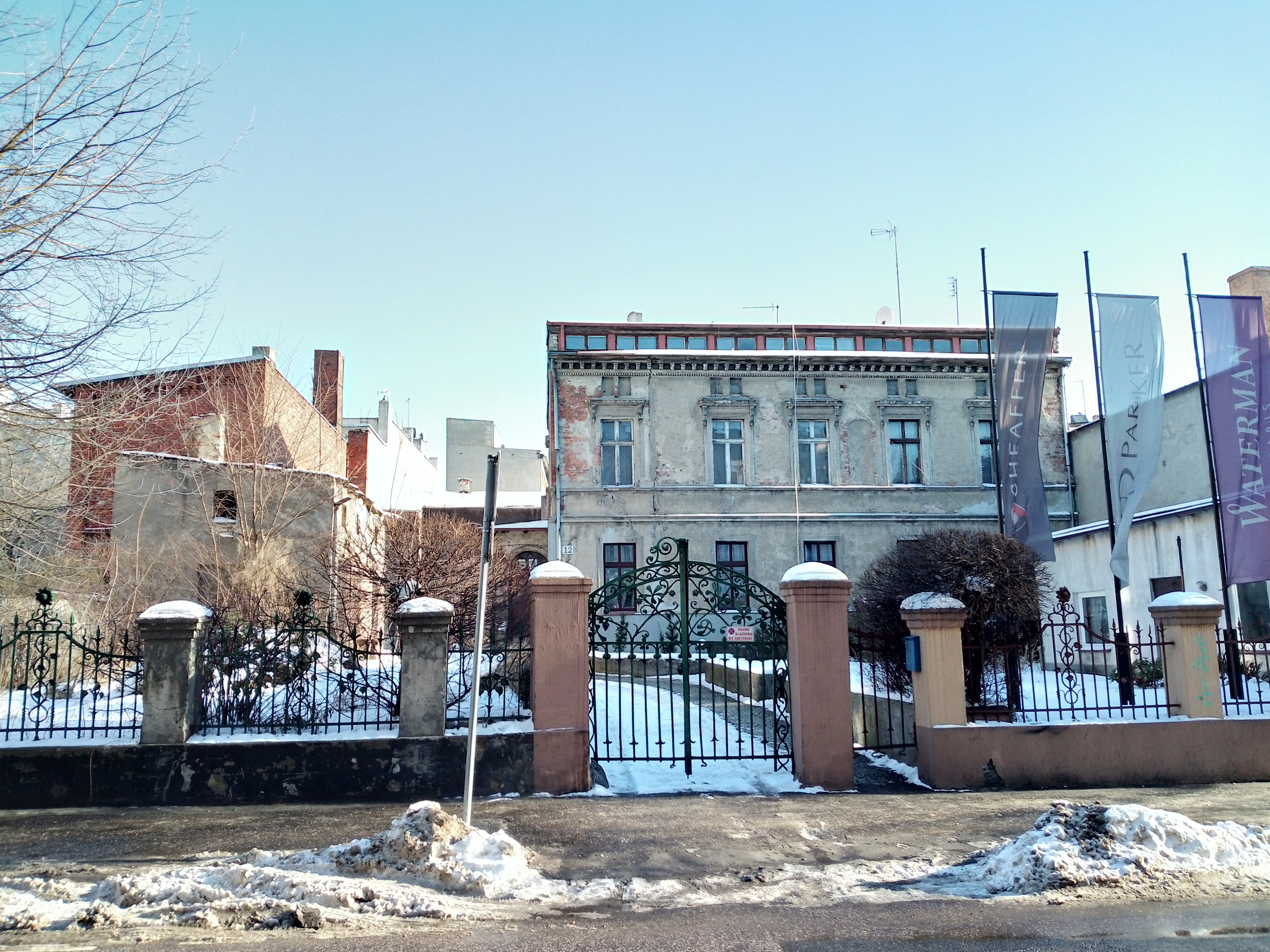
View from the street

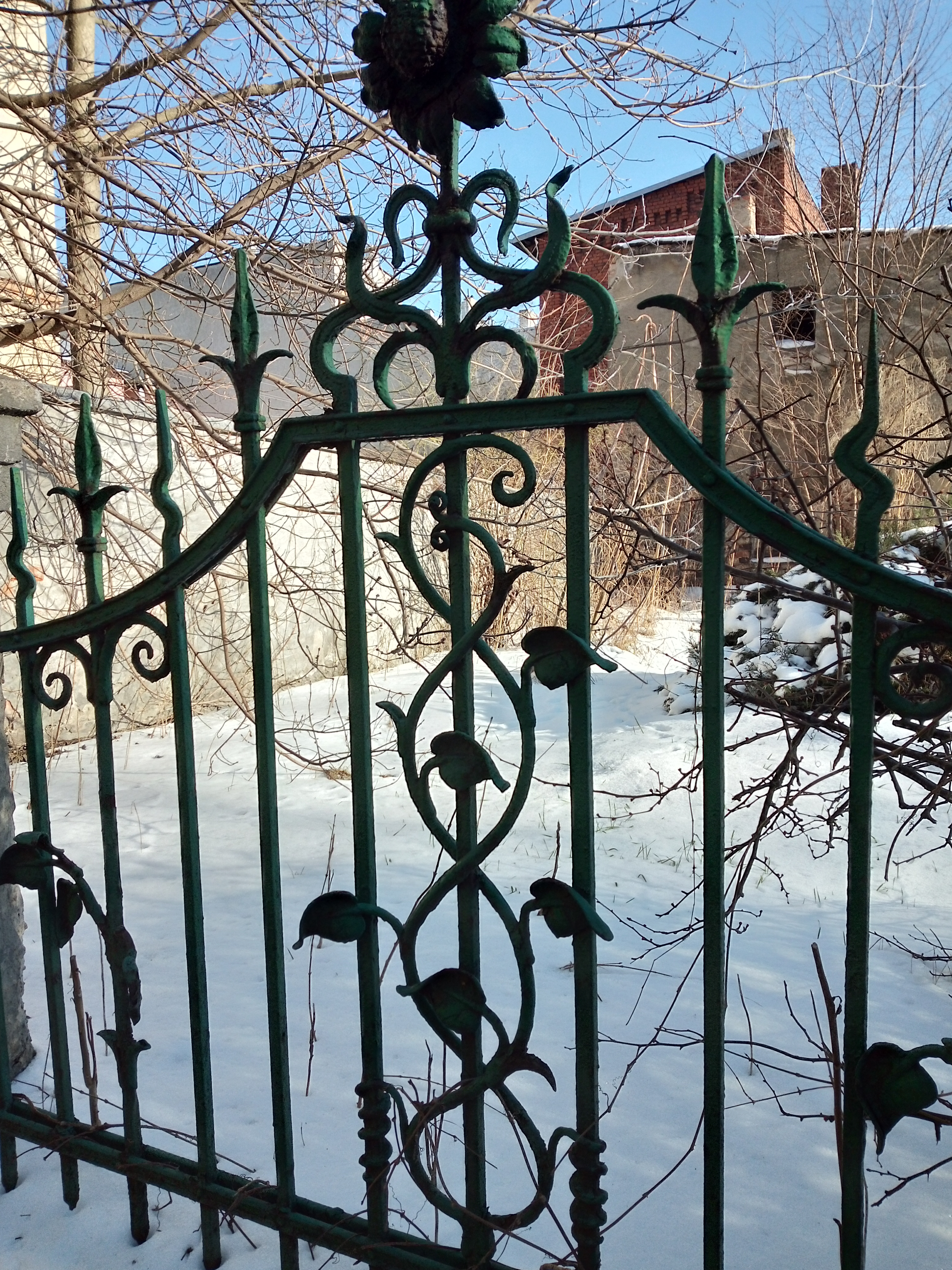
Detail of the wrought iron fencing

=== Tenement at 13, corner with Lipowa street ===
1883

Eclecticism

Nr.13, like Nr.15, belonged initially to the same person, Wilhelm Schmidt, a restaurateur at "12 Wilhelmstraße" (16 Focha street). At the start of the 20th century, he moved to live there, as a rentier, till the late 1920s.

Thoroughly refurbished in 2020, the building displays a plethora of architectural details, among others: an adorned corner bay window supported by stucco crafted corbels, round pediments with stuccoed motifs, a transom stained glass window above the entrance door and a wooden corbel table topping both elevations.

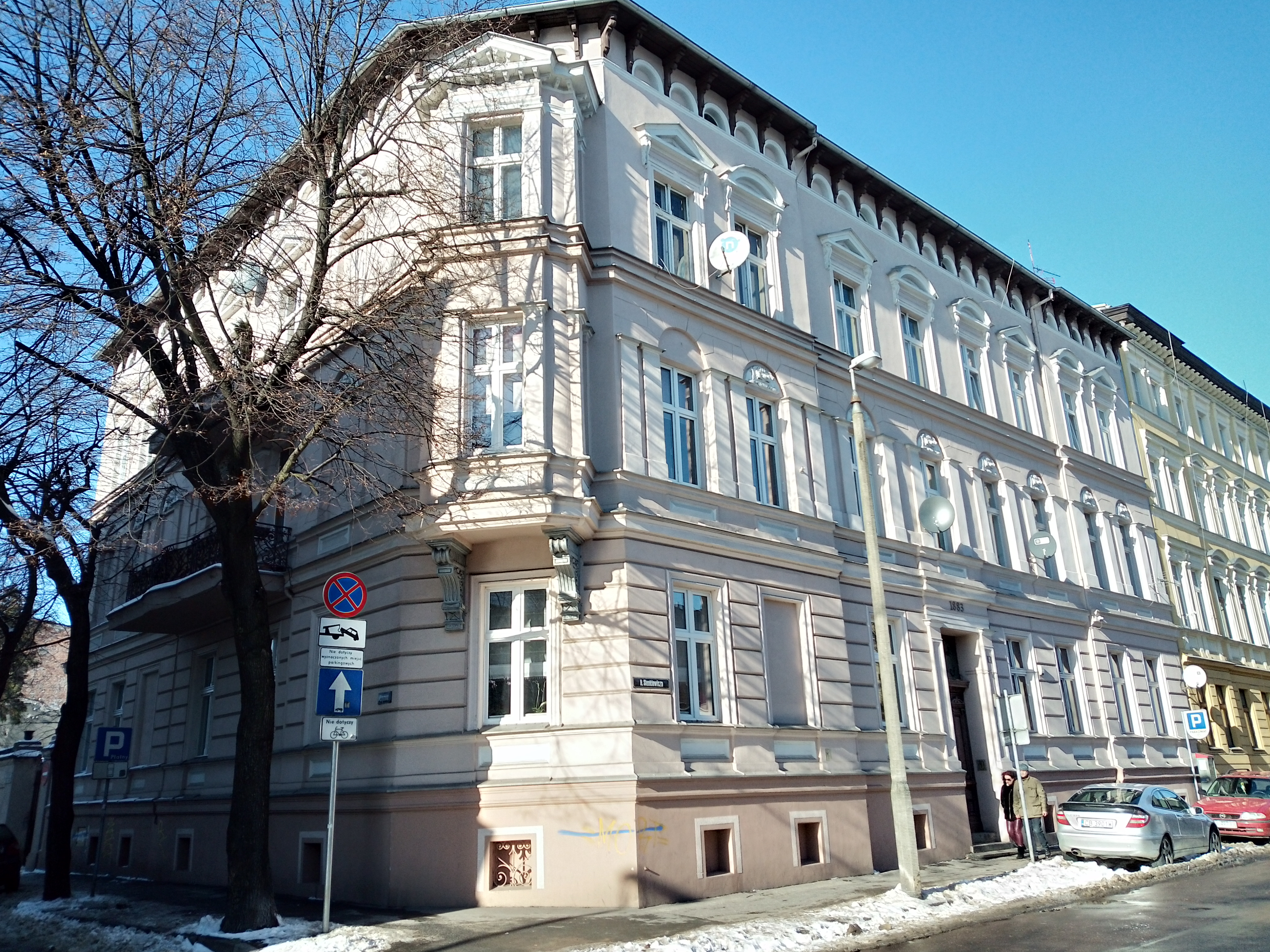
Corner view

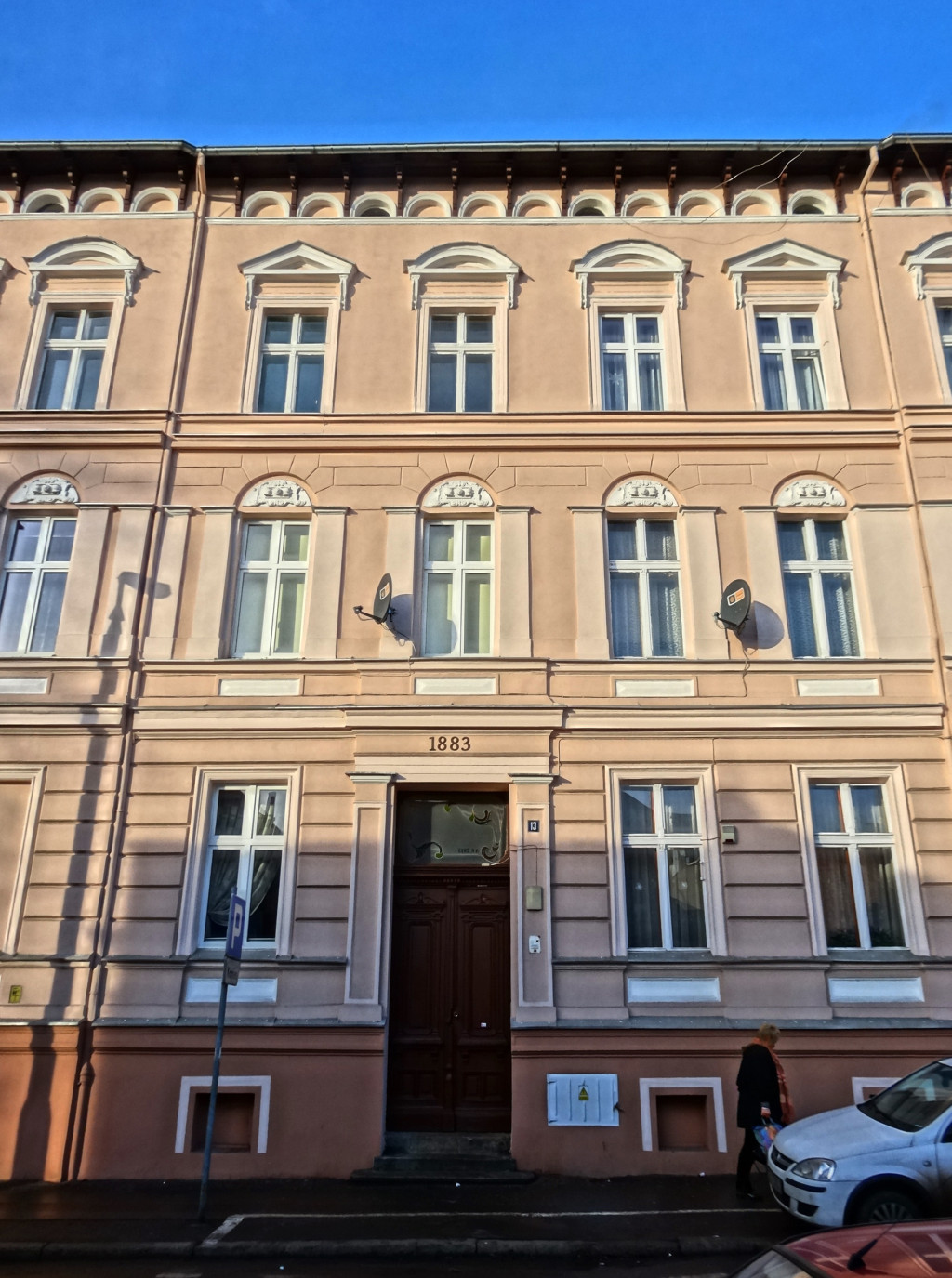
Elevation on Sienkiewicza street

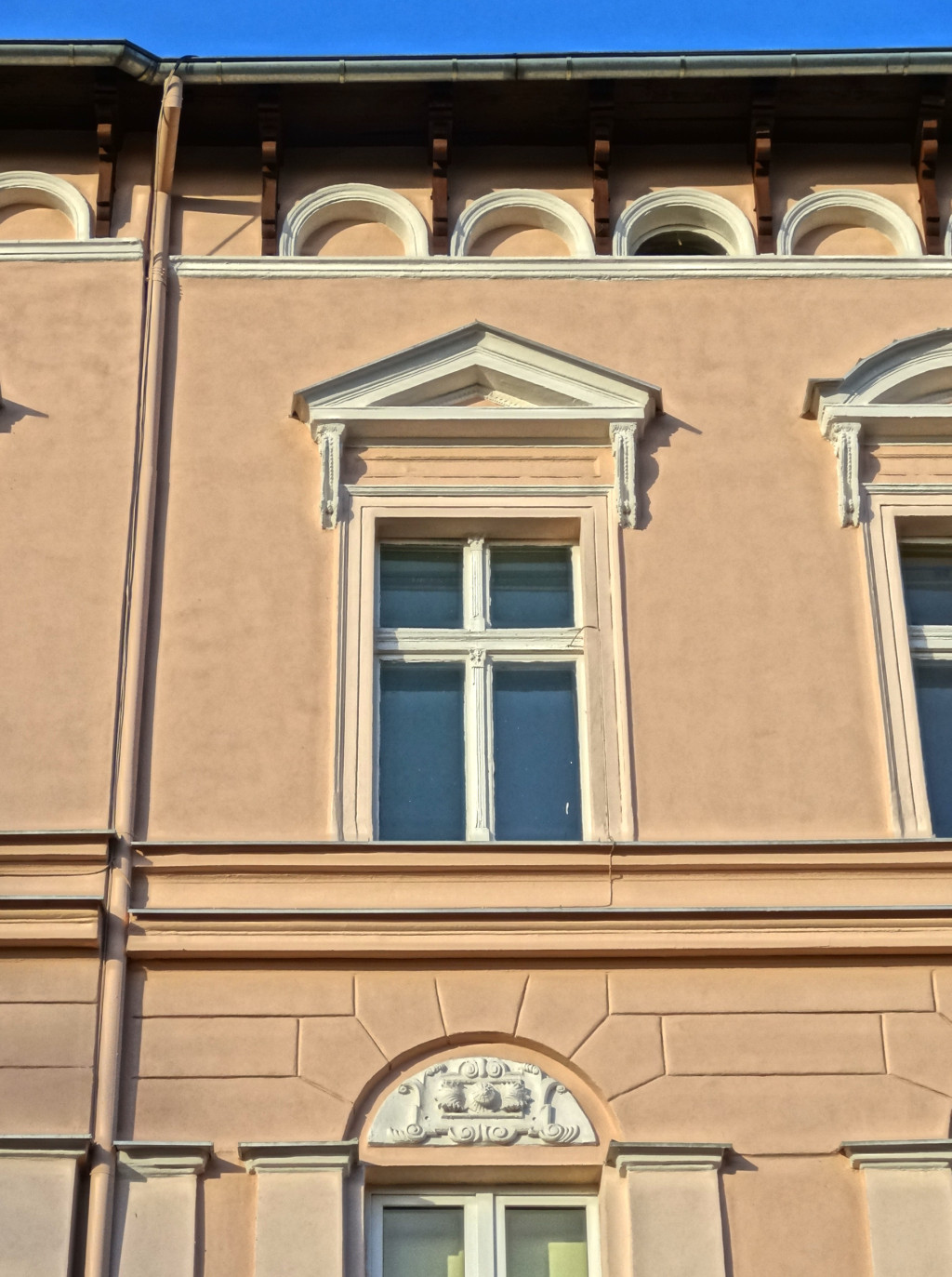
Decoration detail

=== Tenement at 14 ===
1890s

Eclecticism

This tenement was commissioned by Gustav Röscke, a baker living at "88 Bahnoffstraße" (today's 18 Dworcowa Street).

The following decoration elements are visible on the main elevation of the second and third floor: pilasters with Corinthian order capitals, delicately crafted plastered corbels and corbel tables.

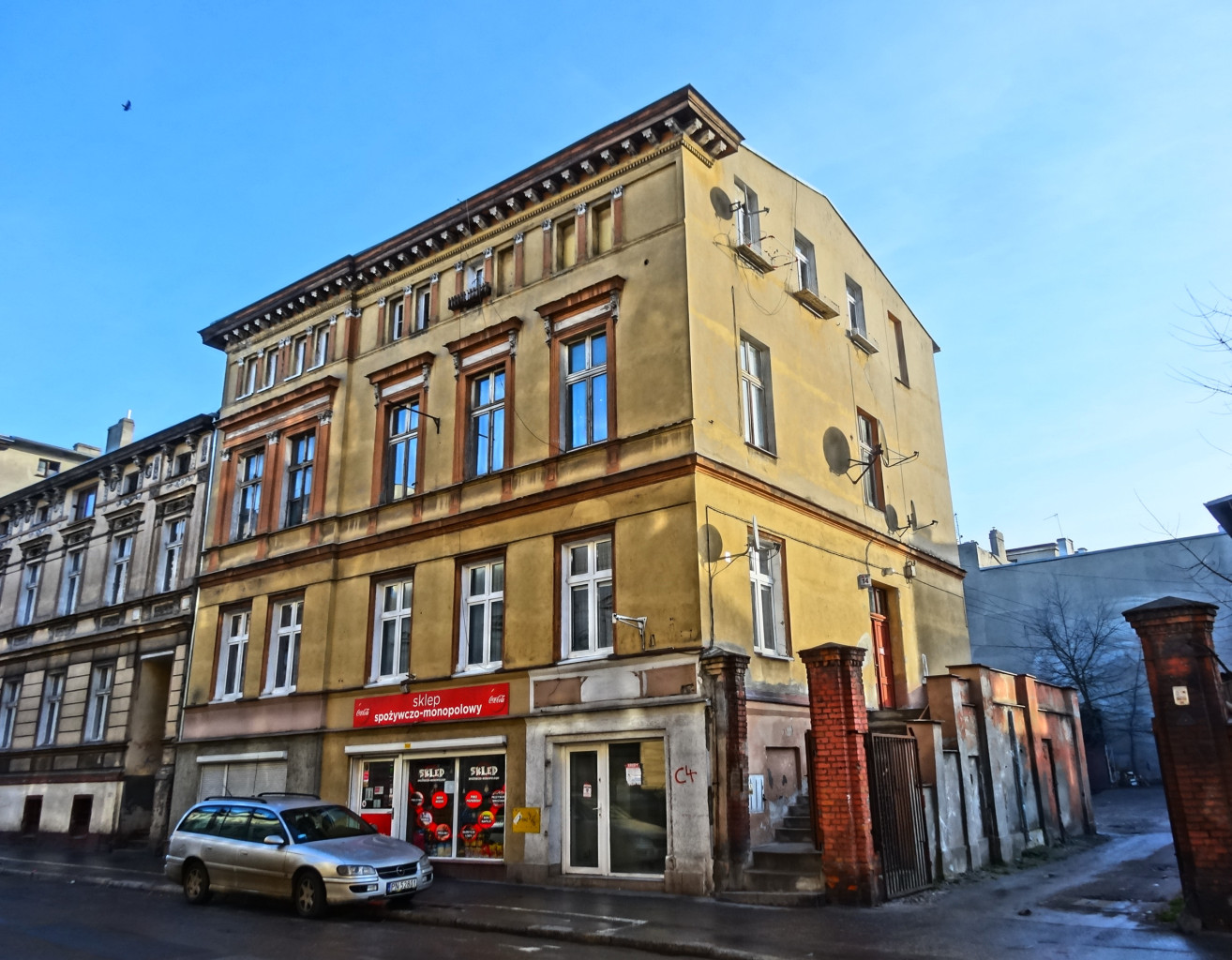
View from the street

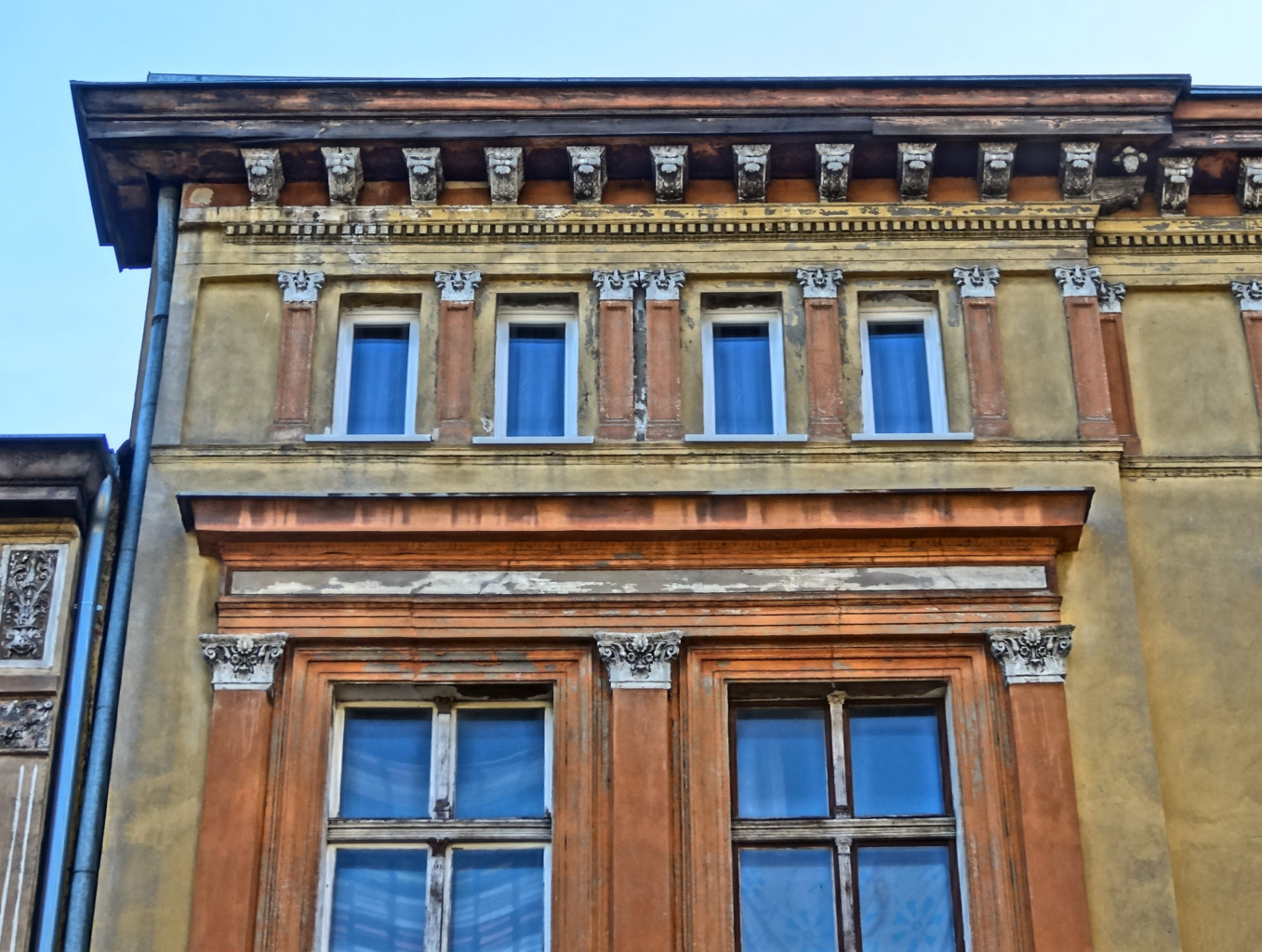
Facade detail

=== Tenement at 15 ===
1890s

Eclecticism

Nr.15, like Nr.13, belonged initially to the same person, Wilhelm Schmidt, a restaurateur at "12 Wilhelmstraße" (16 Focha street). In 1900, it changed hands: its new owner was Gustav Schmidt, another restaurateur living at nearby "18 Elisabethstaße" (35 Śniadeckich street).

Renovated in the late 2010s, the facade displays plastered pediments above the openings and corbel tables beneath the eaves.

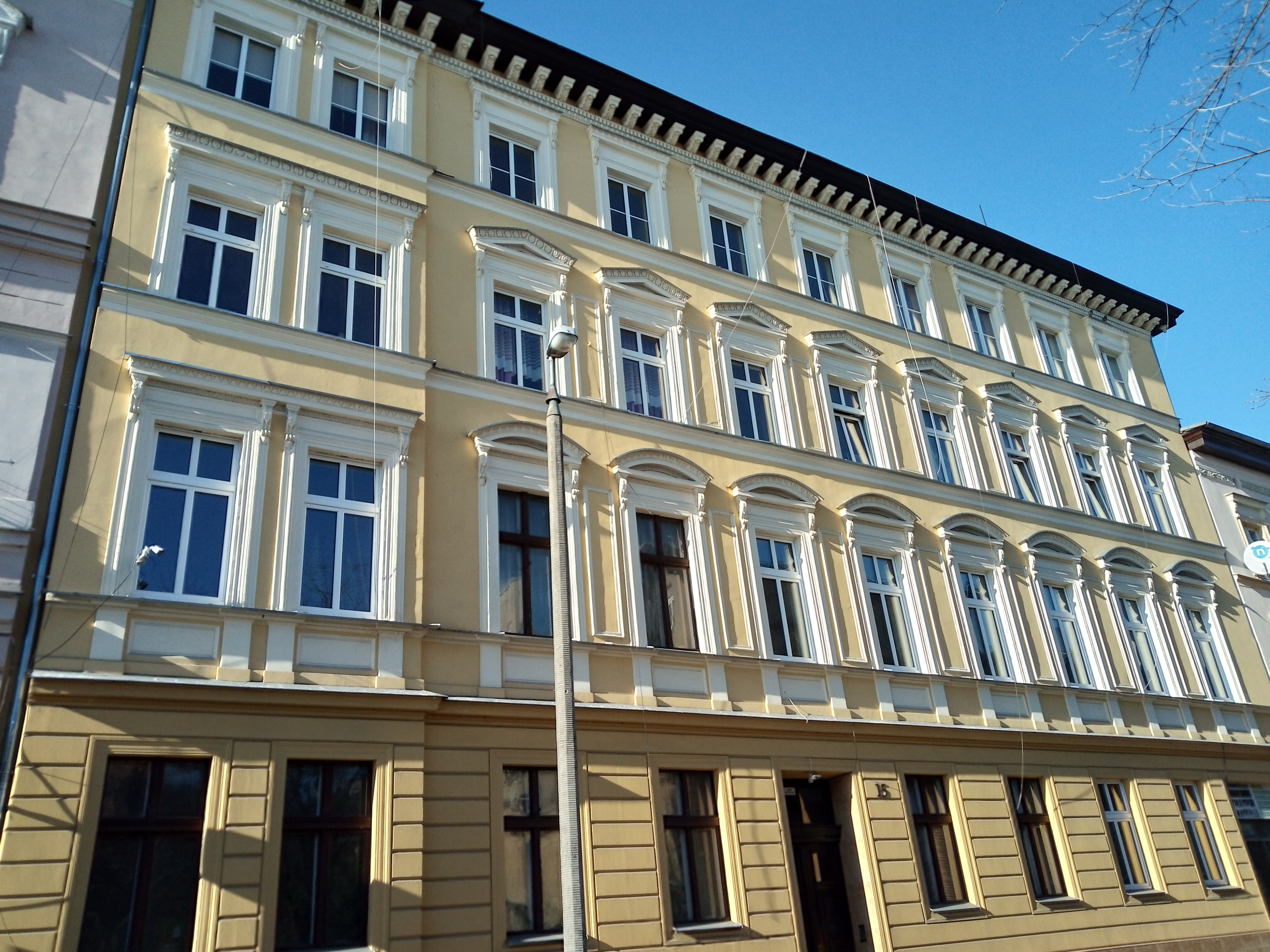
Main frontage

=== ßausebad tenement at 16 ===
1870

Eclecticism

Akin to Nr.12, this building was erected in the early days of the street, and registered as "22 Mittelstraße". It was then possessed by a master bookbinder, Otto ßausebad. In 1900, this address changed to "57 Mittelstraße" while retaining the same owner.

Refitted in the 2010s, the Mansard roofed tenement displays architectural details, notably stuccoed cartouches as well as embellished window framing (lintel, pediments).

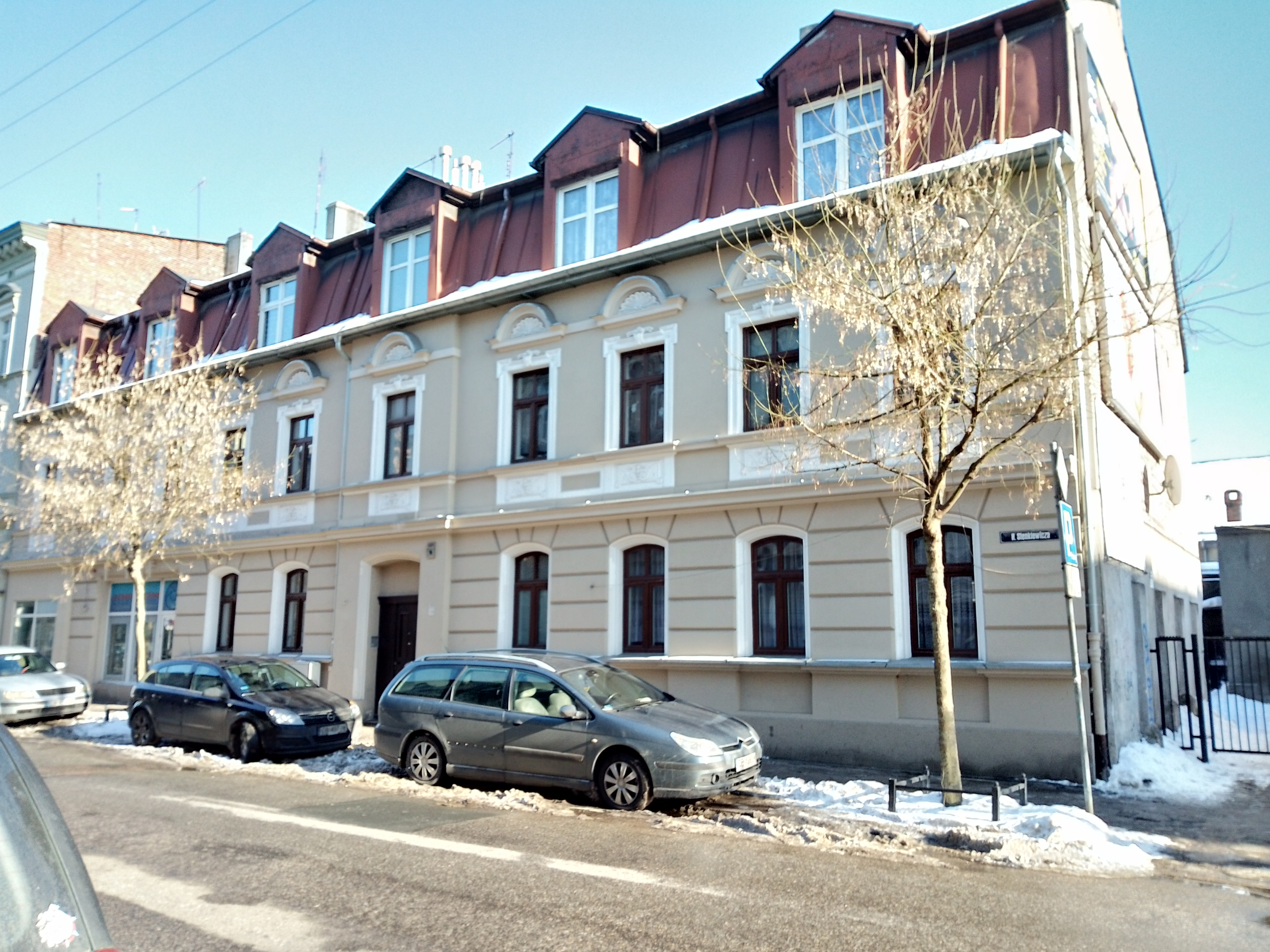
Main elevation

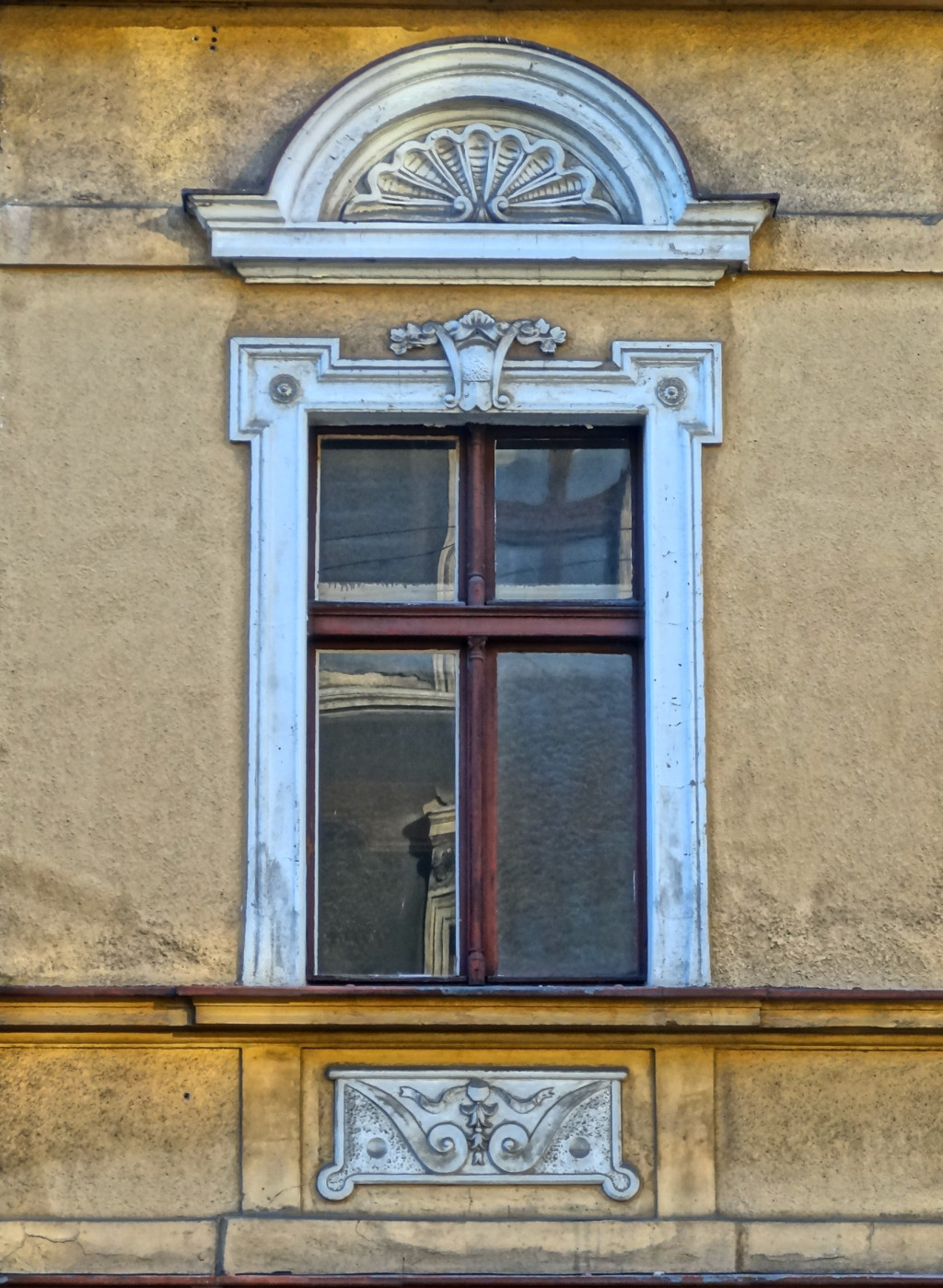
Decoration details before renovation

=== Tenement at 17 ===
1879, by Anton Hoffmann

Eclecticism

Successive landlords were the Schmidts, Wilhelm then Gustav, both restaurateurs.

The initial design is the work of the local architect Anton Hoffmann, father-in-law of another building designer in the city, Józef Święcicki.

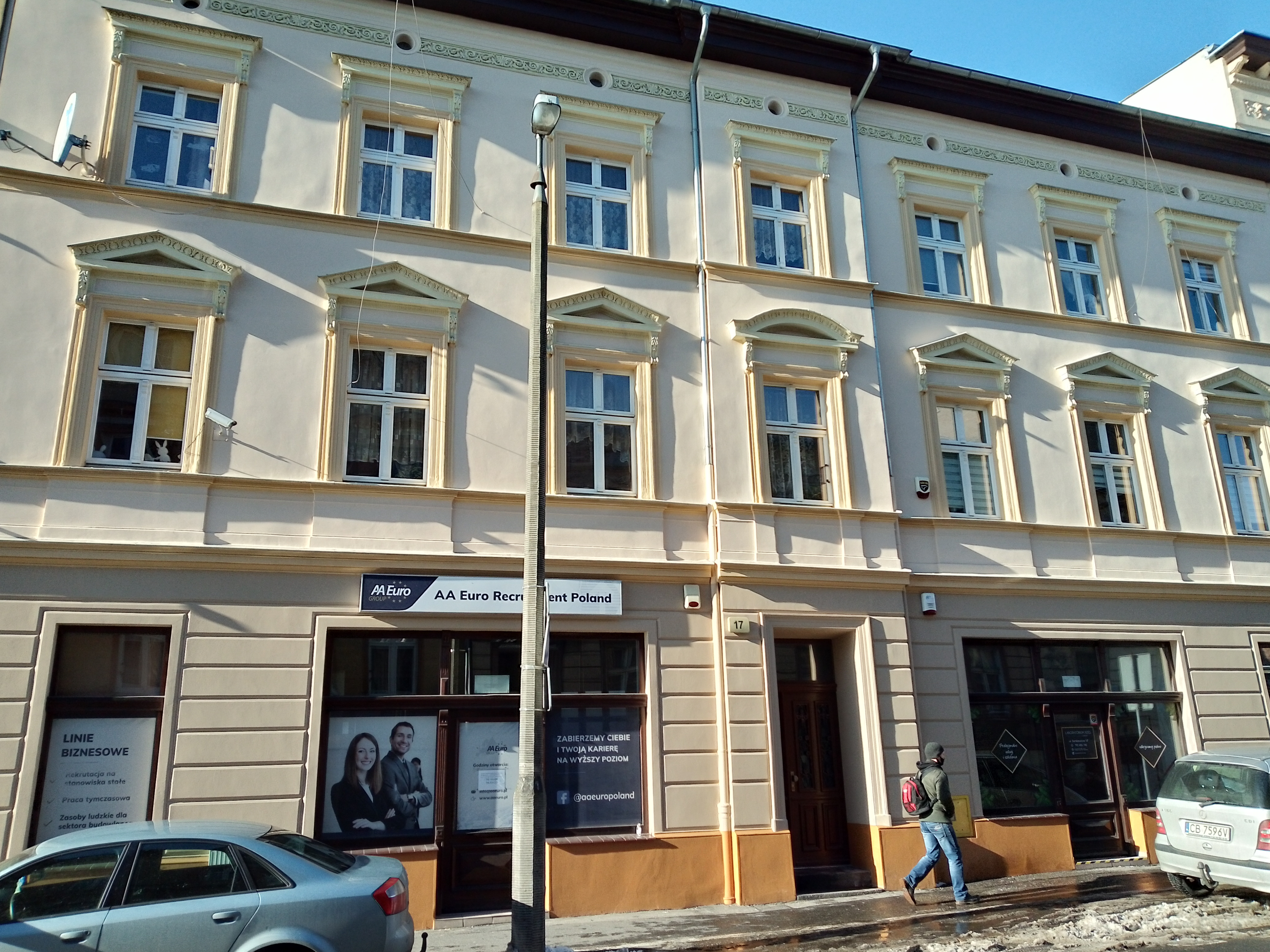
Facade on the street

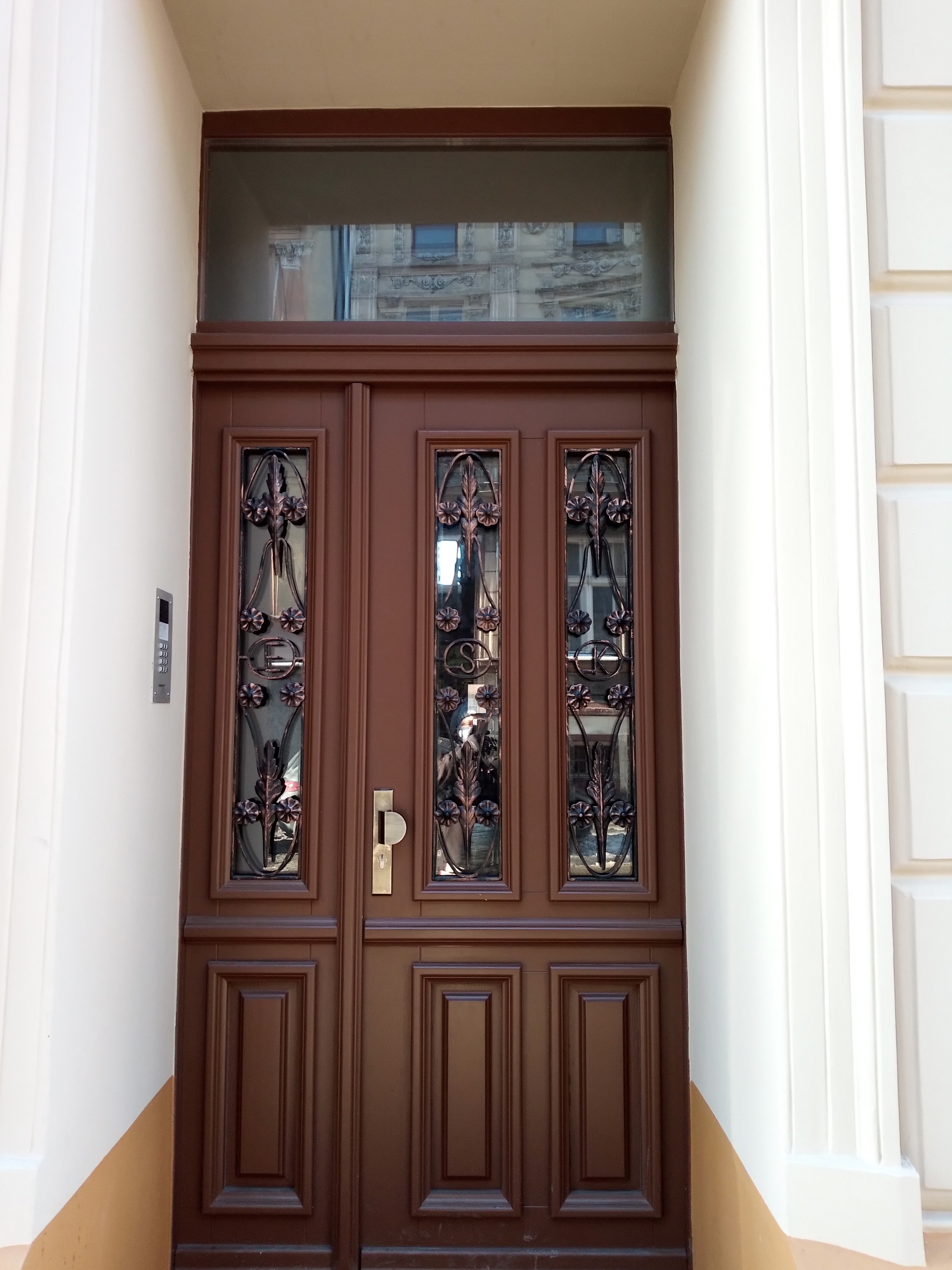
Main entrance door

=== Tenement at 35 Śniadeckich street, corner with Sienkiewicza street ===
1894

Eclecticism

The first landlord of this building at then Elisabethstraße 18 was Gustav Schmidt, a restaurateur who lived there until the beginning of World War I. He was also the owner of the building at Nr.15.

This tenement is particularly noticeable by its grand bay window overhanging the corner. The first floor is adorned with columns, rosettes on the lintel and a triangular pediment, and second displays pilasters crowned by a tented roof. The facade on Śniadecki Street is similarly ornamented, in addition to two large wrought iron balconies.

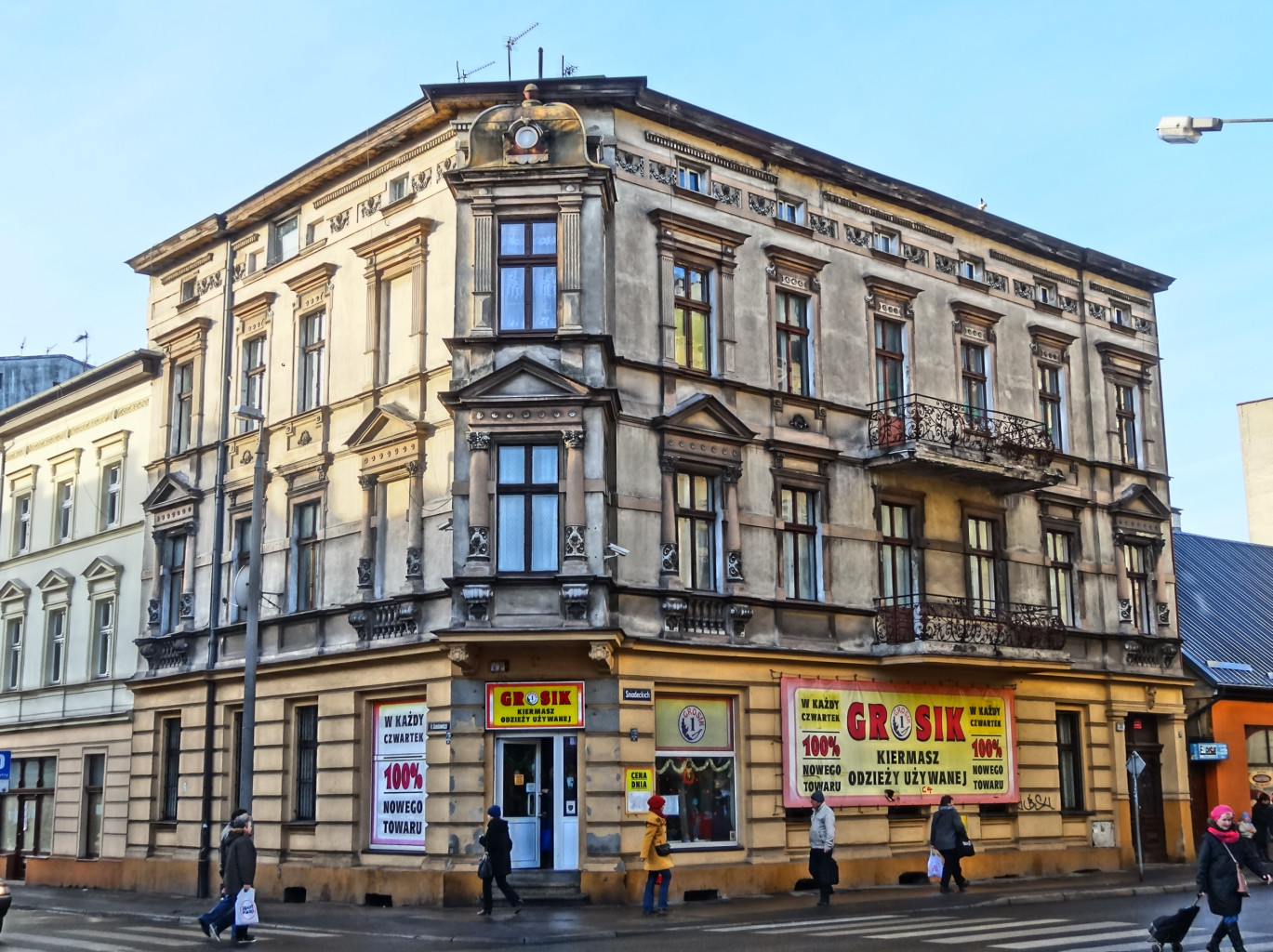
Corner view

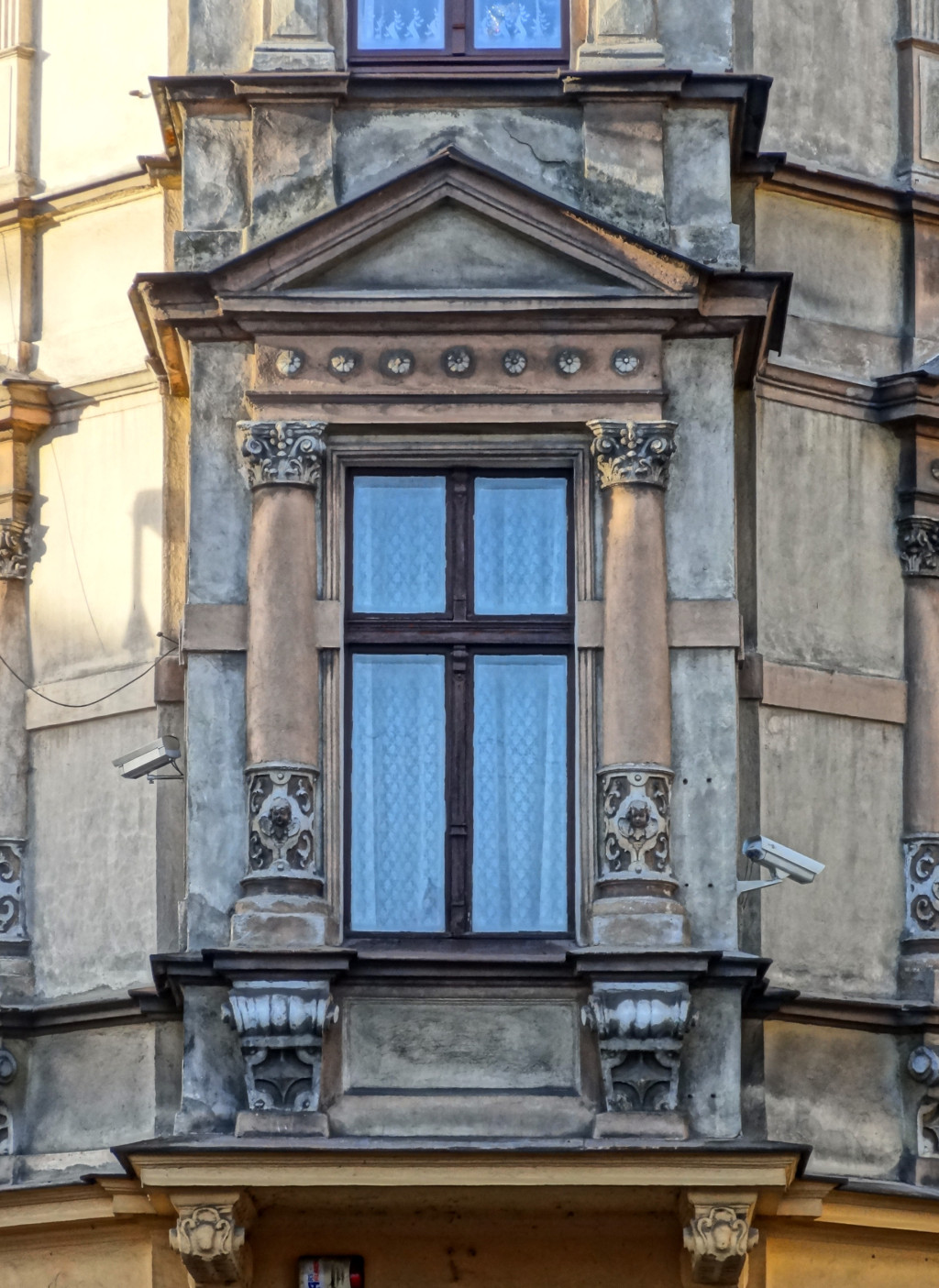
Bay window first floor window

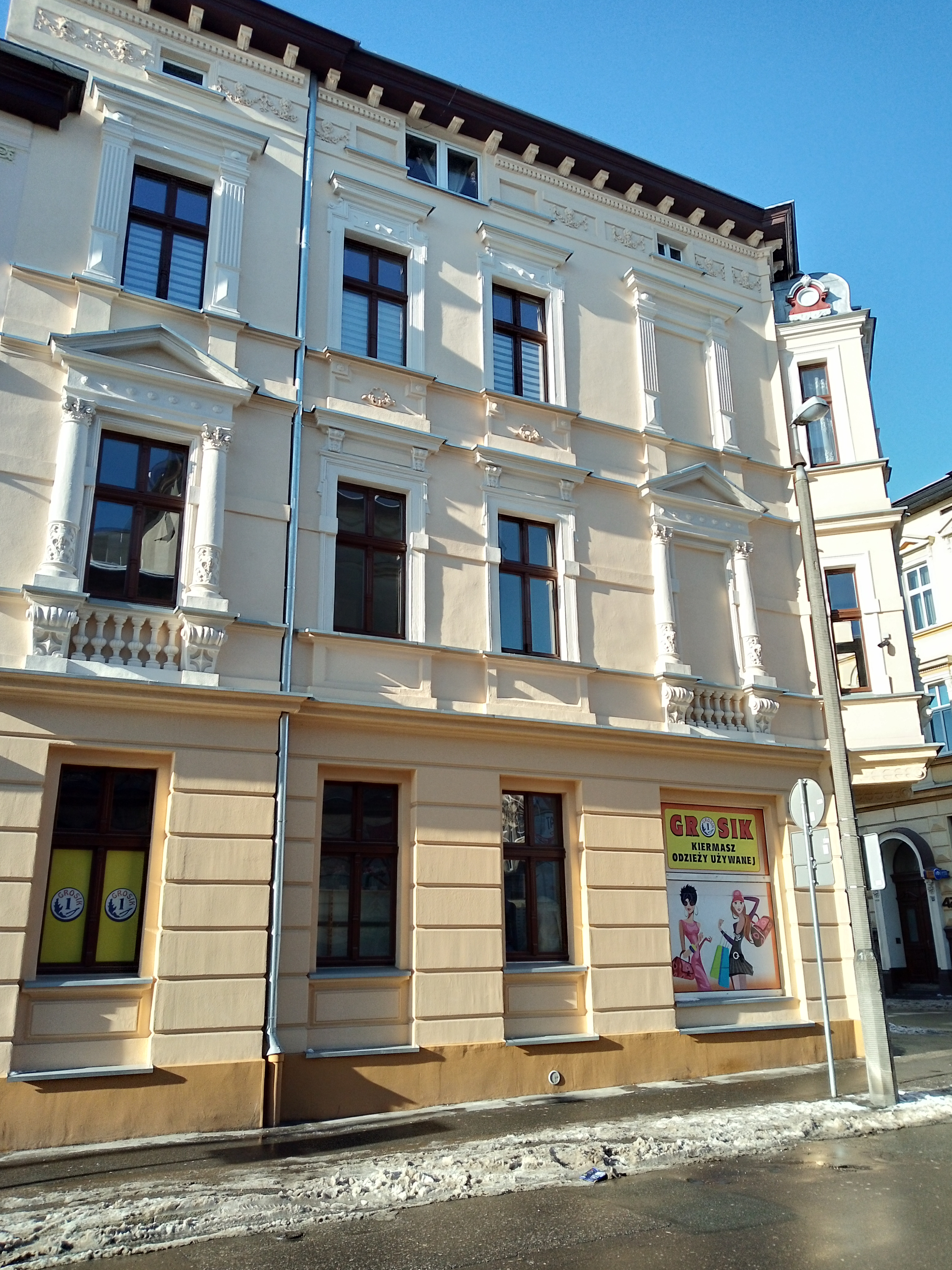
Renovated elevation on Sienkiewicza street

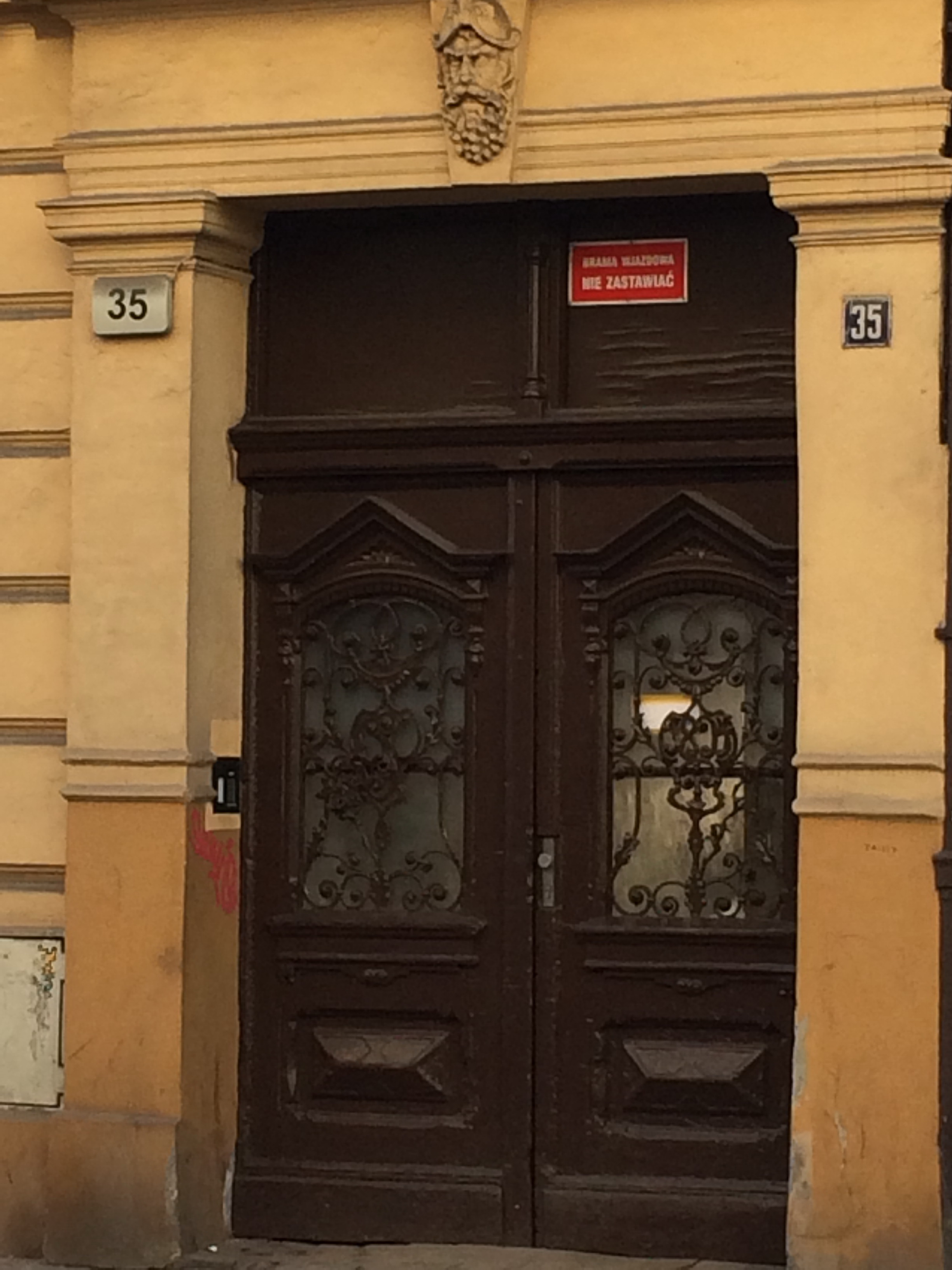
Gate on Śniadecki Street

=== Max Schmidt tenement at 42 Śniadeckich street, corner Sienkiewicza ===
1882–1883, by Józef Święcicki and Anton Hoffmann

Neo-Renaissance

The building, then at Elisabethstraße 42a, was a commission from Max Schmidt, a teacher. It was one of the first realizations of Józef Święcicki together with his stepfather, Anton Hoffman, a master bricklayer.

Recently renovated, the elevation boasts neo-Renaissance forms inspired by the Italian Cinquecento, including bossages and motifs. In the corner facing both streets is a bay window on two levels, flanked at each floor by lean columns. In his next works, Józef Święcicki would elaborate further on this architectural style, as seen in the buildings at Tenement at Freedom Square 1 (1896) or at 1/3 Stary Port (1893–1905).

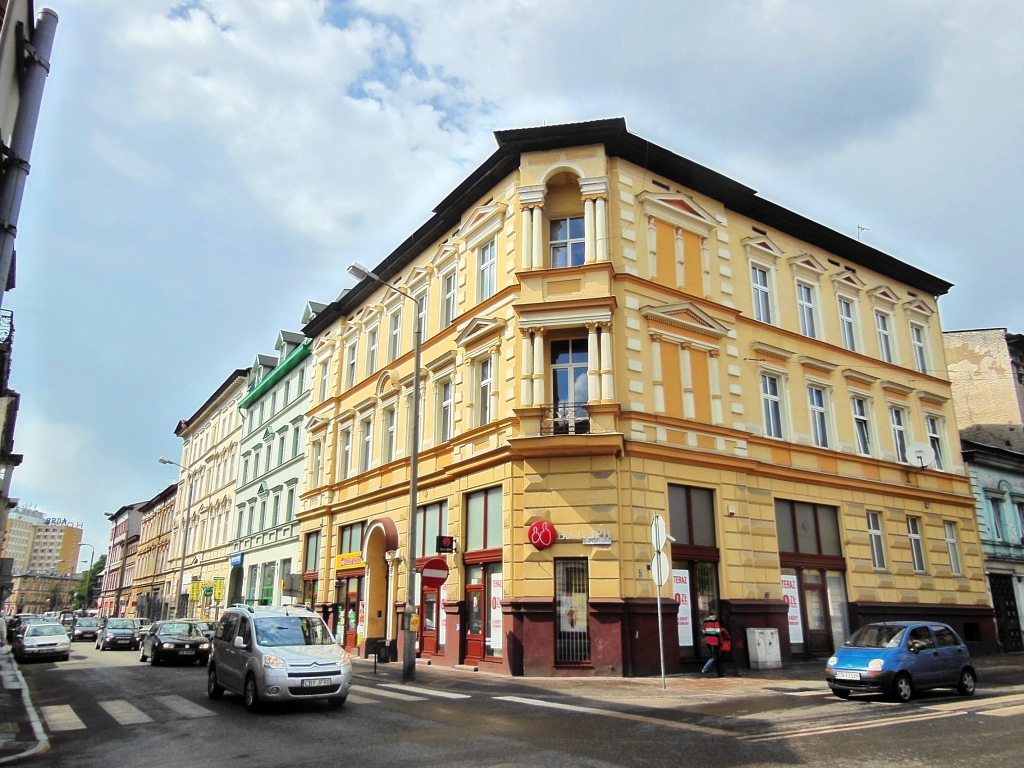
View from streets crossing

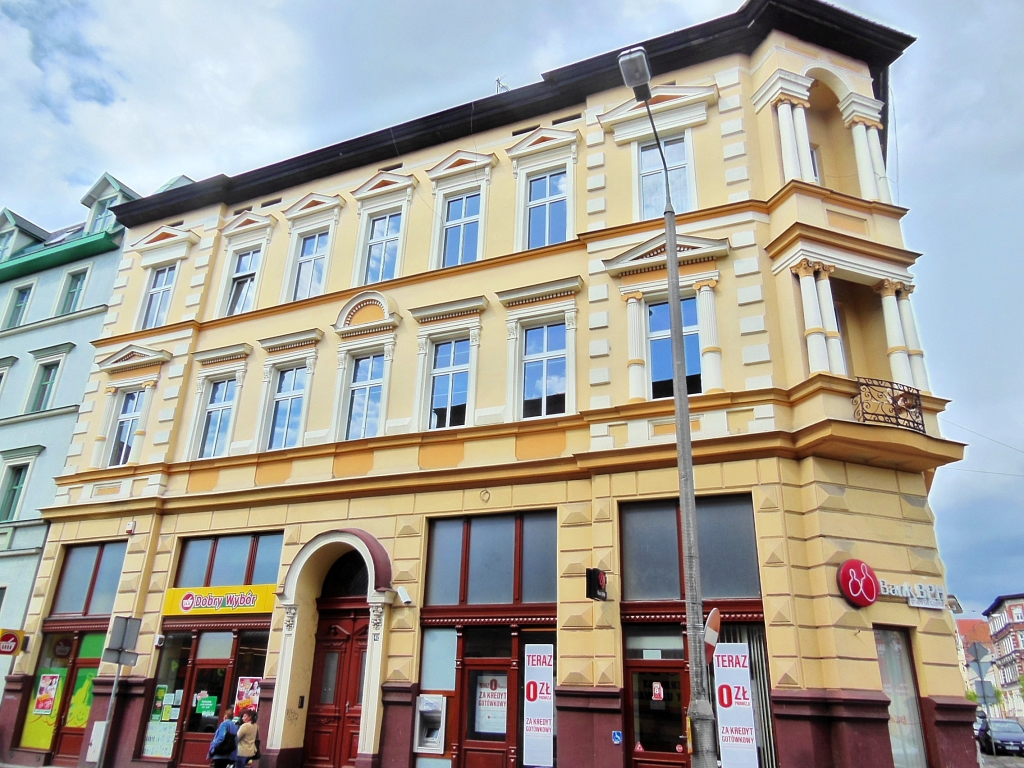
Facade onto Śniadecki street

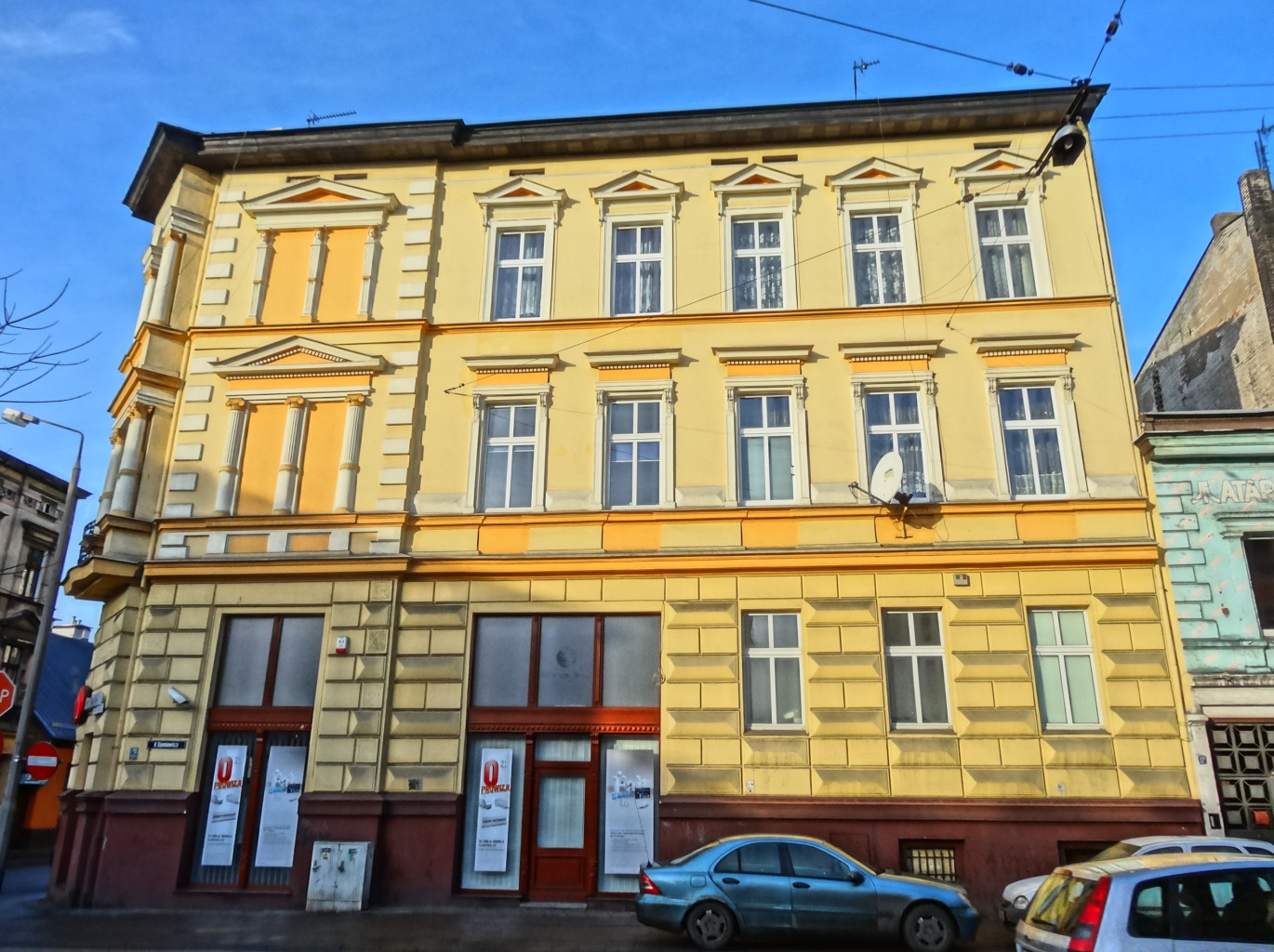
Facede onto Sienkiewicza street

=== Tenement at 17a ===
1892

Eclecticism

This small building appeared under construction in 1892, then was listed under different numberings (10, 10a or 11) in Mittelstraße. Its first landlord was Max Schmidt, a teacher, living at "43 Elisabethstraße" (40 Śniadeckich street, now nonexistent).

Wedged between two large tenements, this one-story building displays plastered motifs, bossages, corbel tables and a wrought iron grille.

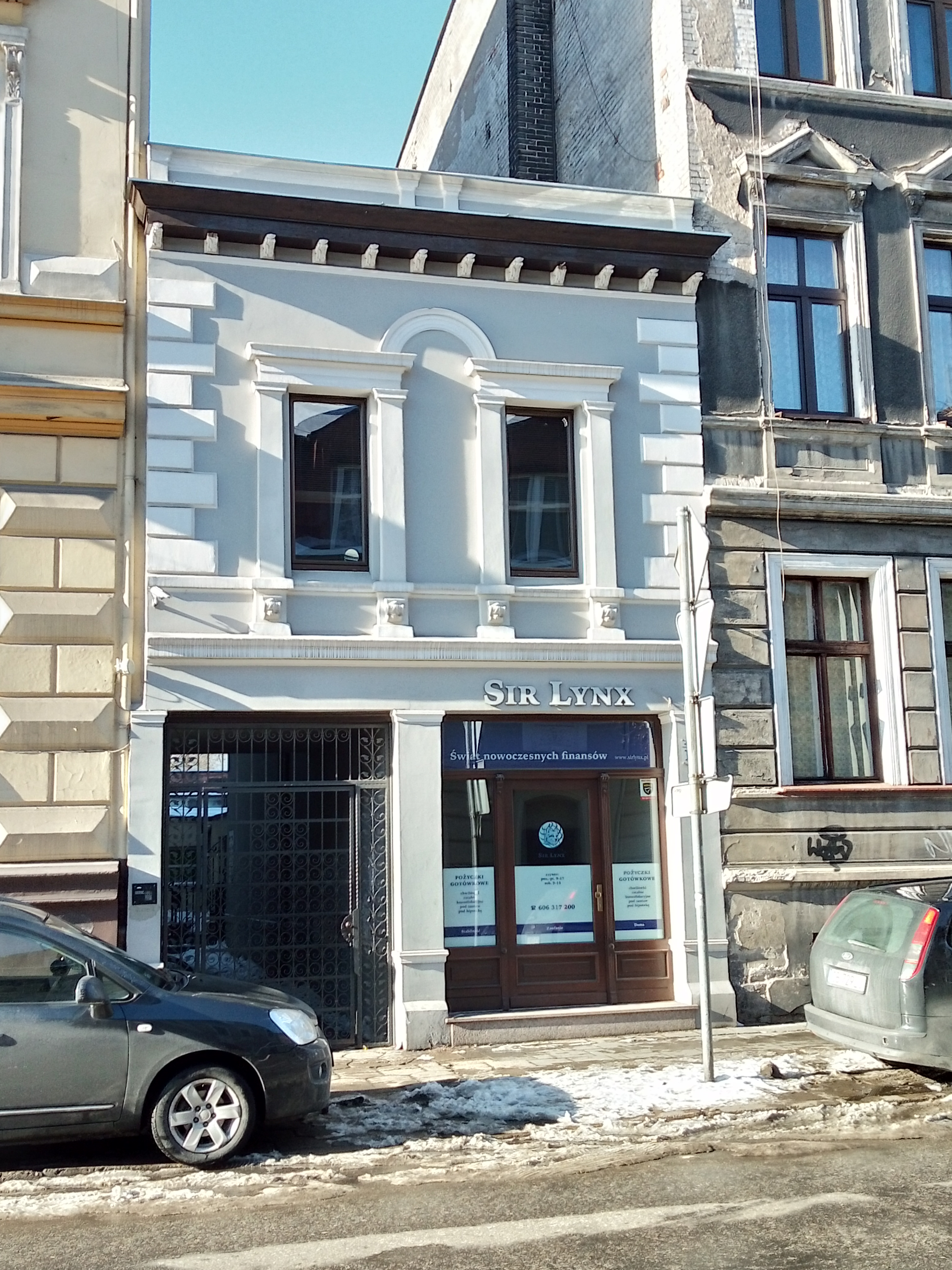
Facade on the street

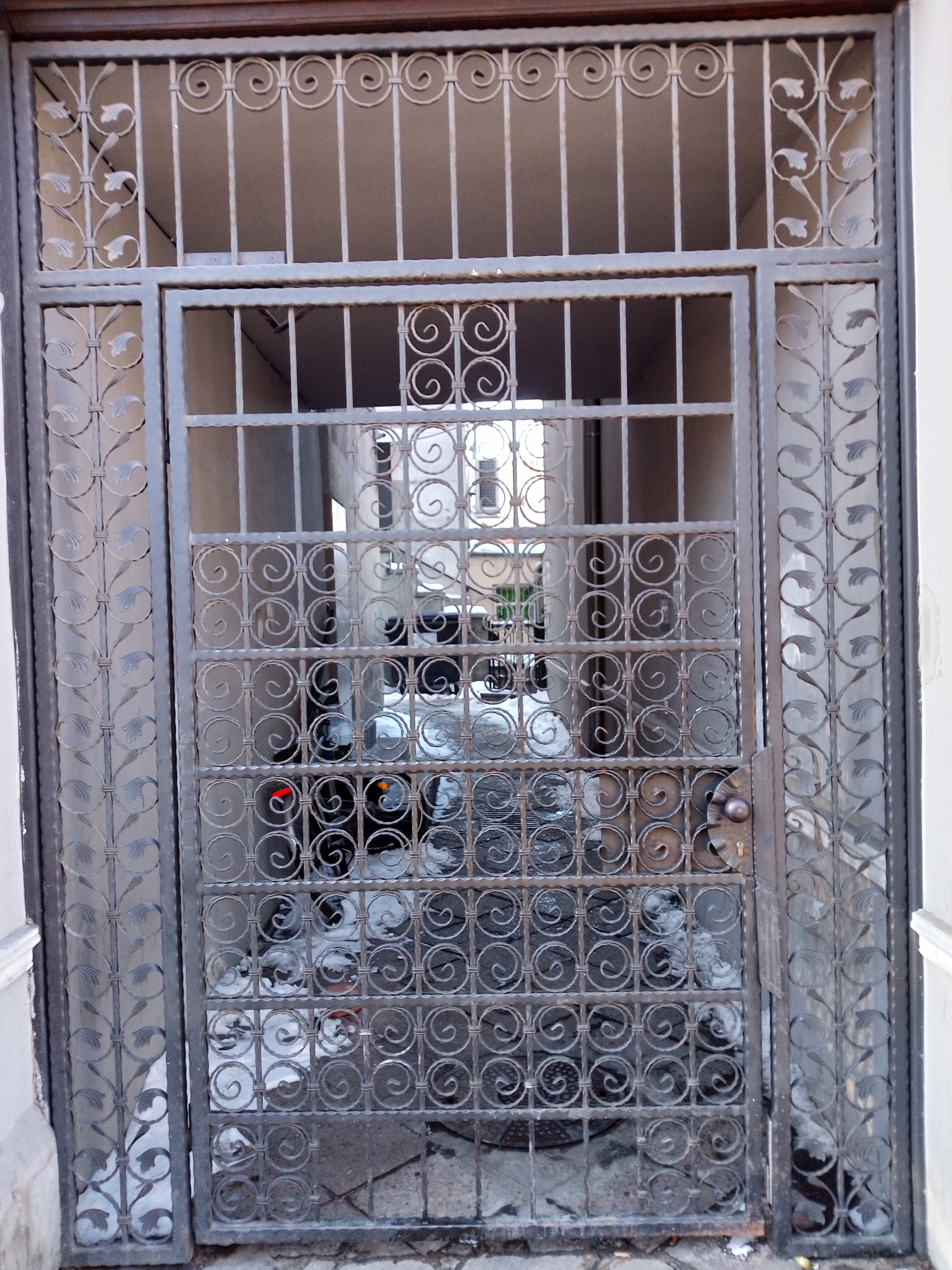
Entrance grille

=== Tenement at 18 ===
1887-188

Eclecticism

The first owner was registered as Constantia Bordanowicz, married to a butcher. At its erection, the address was "34a Mittelstraße".

On the renovated elevation, one can highlight the large wooden door, pedimented openings with stuccoed cartouches beneath and corbel tables.

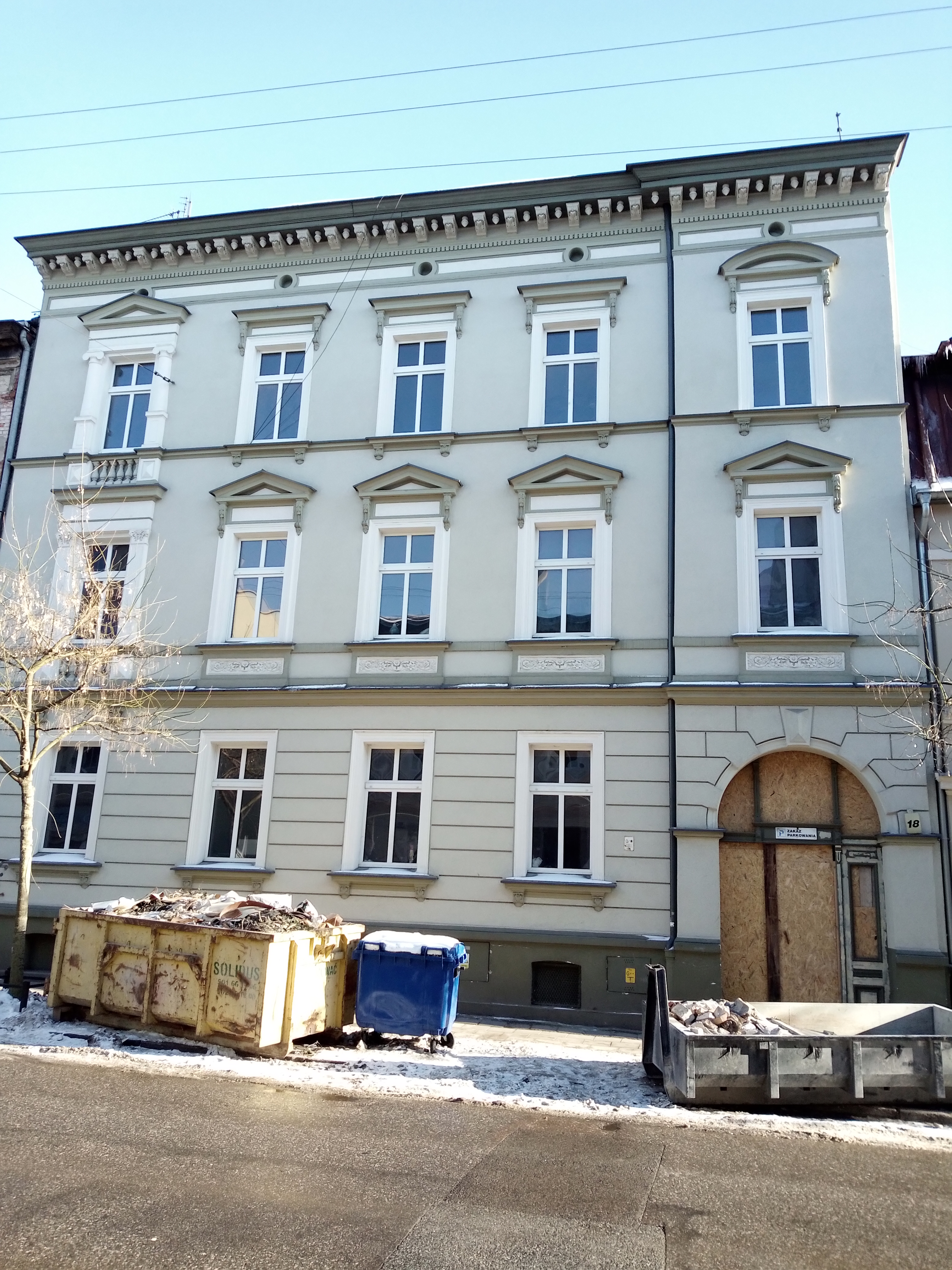
Main elevation

=== Tenement at 19 ===
1890s

Eclecticism

Max Schmidt, a teacher living at "43 Elisabethstraße" (40 Śniadeckich street, now nonexistent) owned this building alongside the one at 17a.

The elevation, marked by time, still exhibits its former painted numbering, 11a. One can make out pediments and a few lesenes flanking the windows.

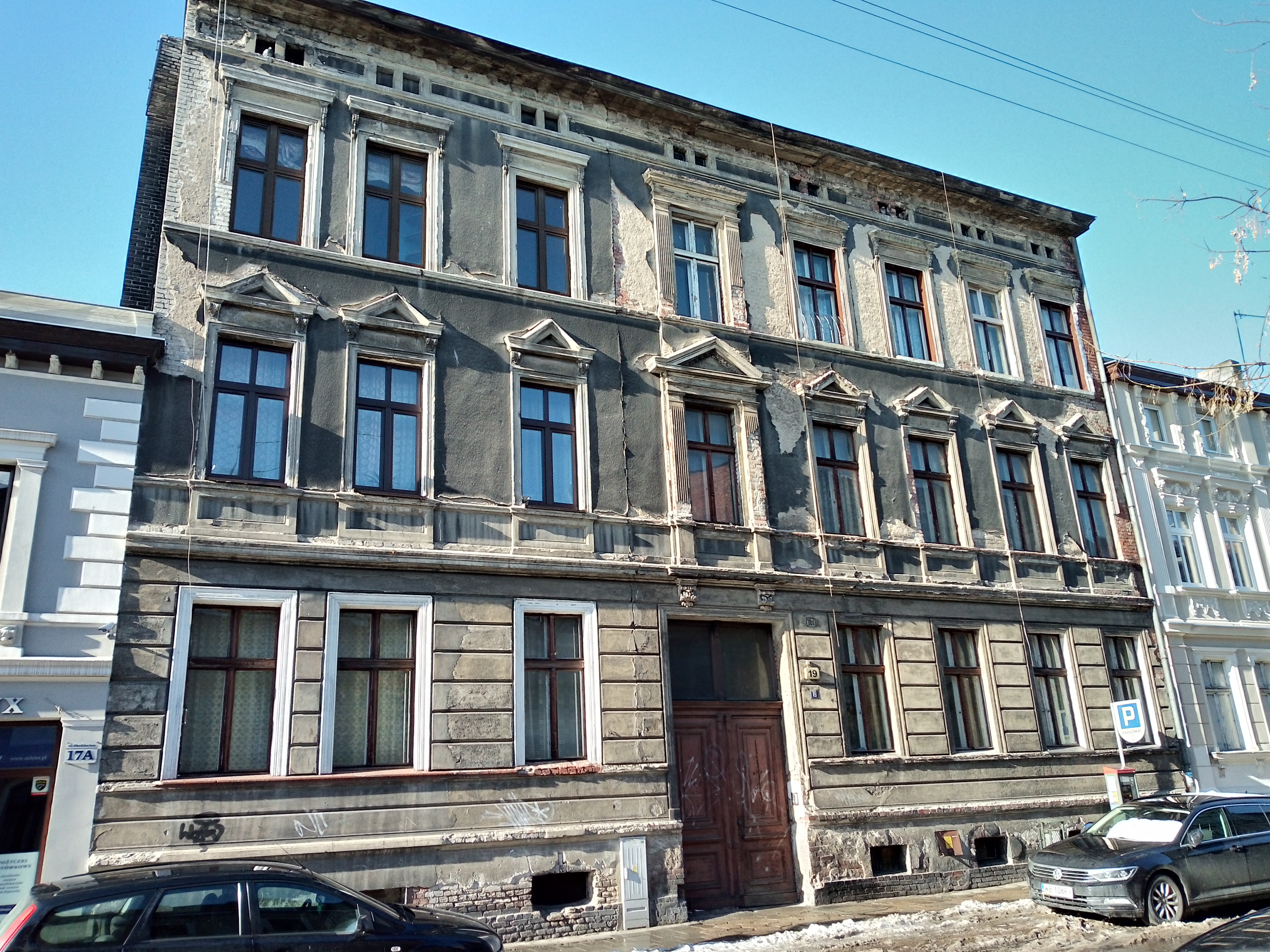
Facade on the street

=== Tenement at 21 ===
1860s

Eclecticism

August Kapelski, a shoemaker, was the first owner of this tenement, then at "8 Mittelstraße". This building was the oldest one registered in the street, at the end of the 1860s.

Its present-day facade is refurbished, with stuccoed festoons on the window sills or on the lintels, pilasters or motifs on the lesenes of the last floor.

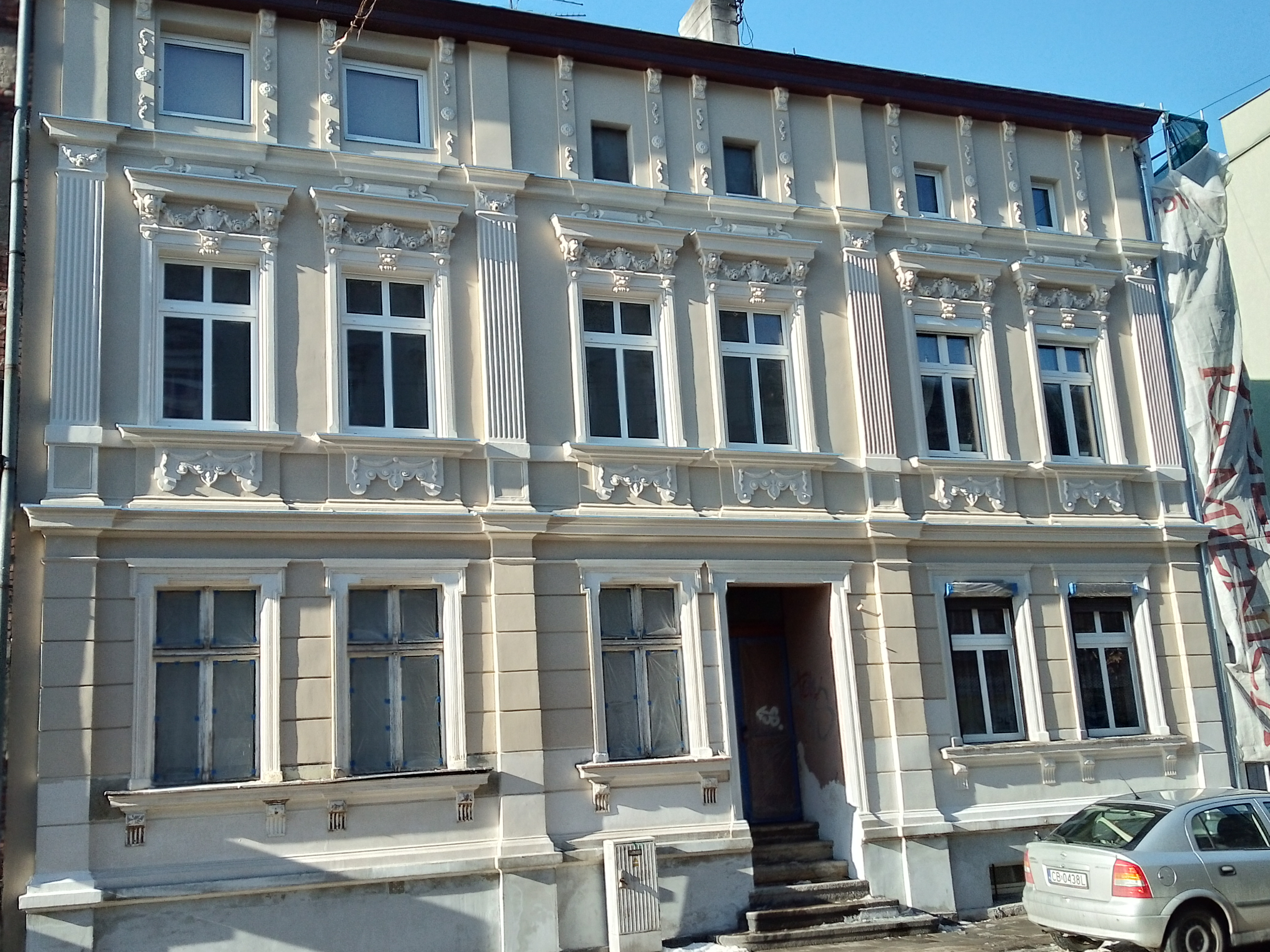
Frontage after renovation

=== Tenement at 23, corner with Chrobrego street ===
1890s, by H. Brennecke

Neo-Renaissance

Teophil Tucholski, a locomotive driver, was the landlord at the construction of this building.

Cartouches are visible on the first floor of both facades.

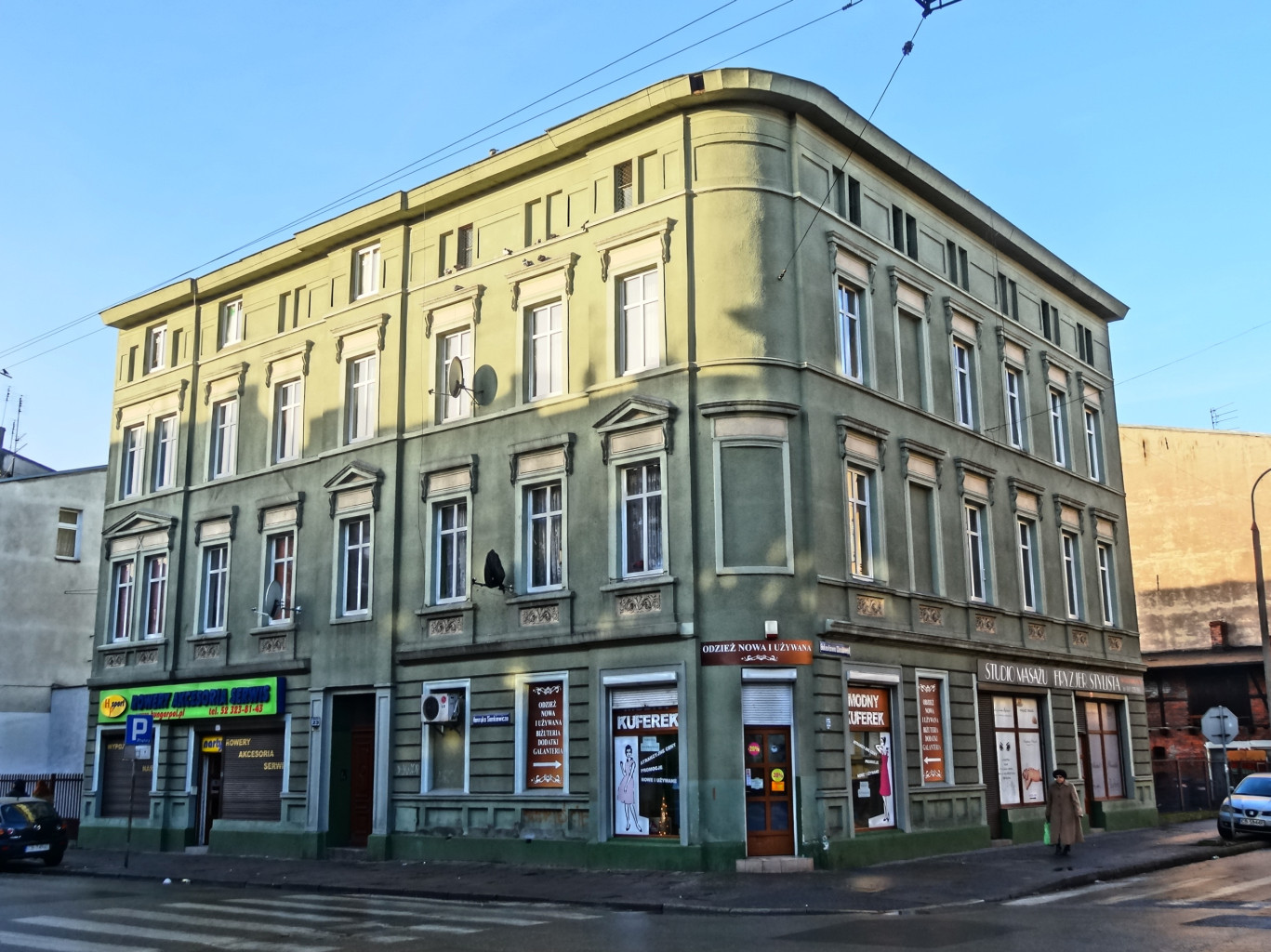
Corner view

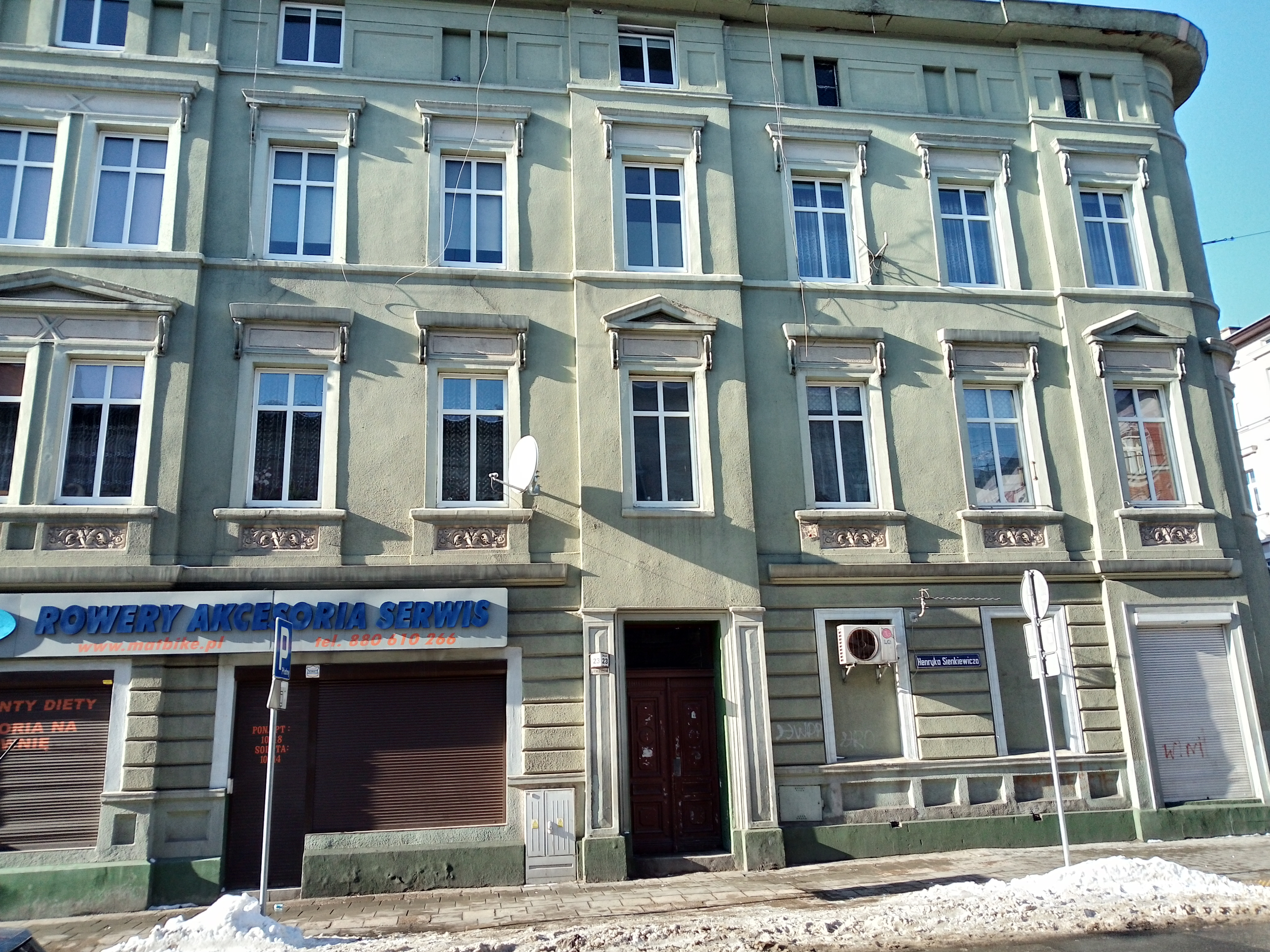
Detail of the elevation on Sienkiewicza street

=== August Jordan tenement at 24, corner with 18 Chrobrego street ===
Registered on Kuyavian-Pomeranian Voivodeship heritage list, Nr.787208, A/1626 issued on February 6, 2013

1891-1892

Eclecticism

This tenement was commissioned by August Jordan, a raft builder. He lived there until the start of the 20th century.

The building, renovated in 2019, is unique in its mix of plain brick and bossage elements. Furthermore, all the windows on the first floor have pediments, while the second story displays floral decoration in cartouches.

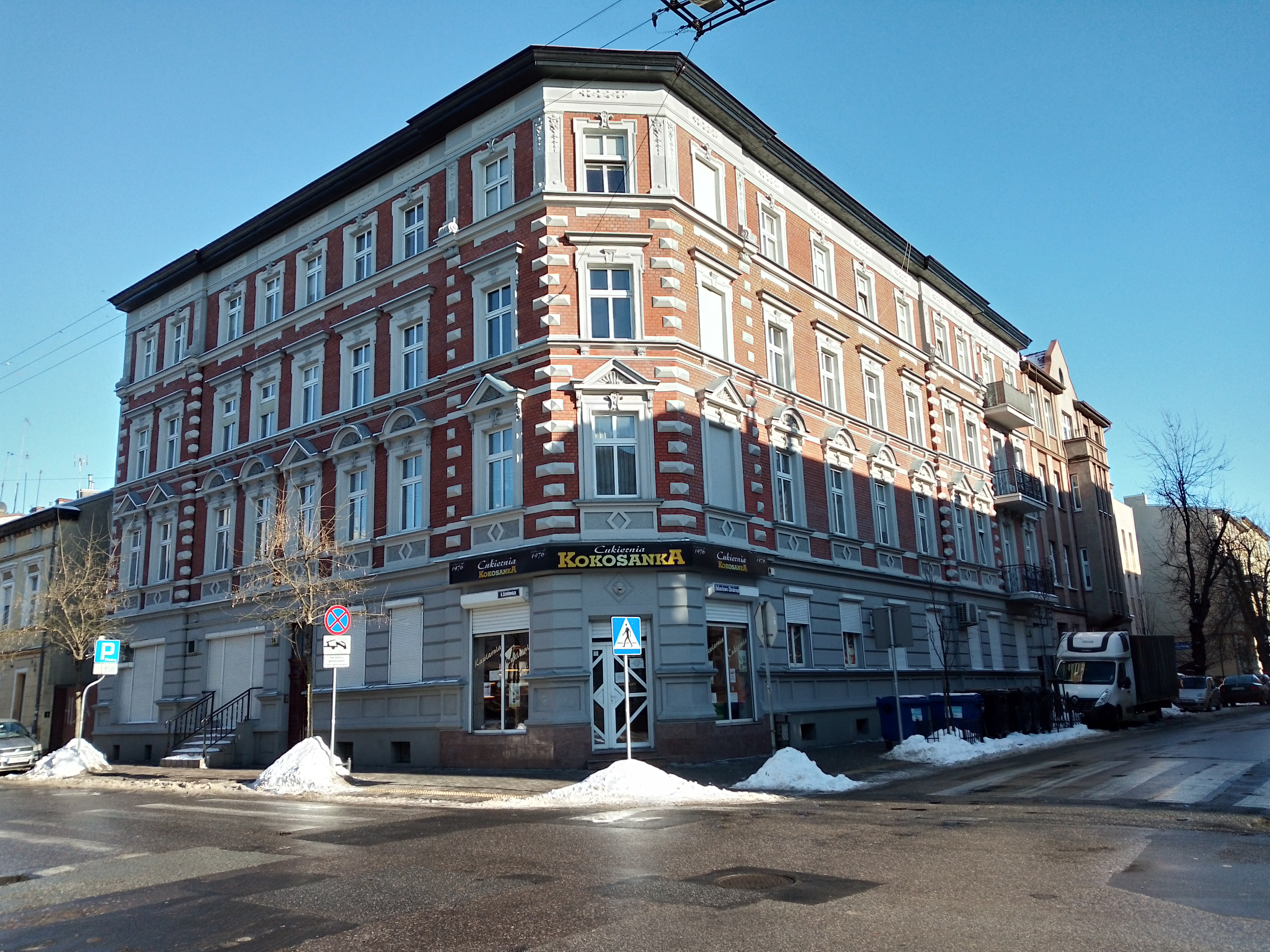
Corner view

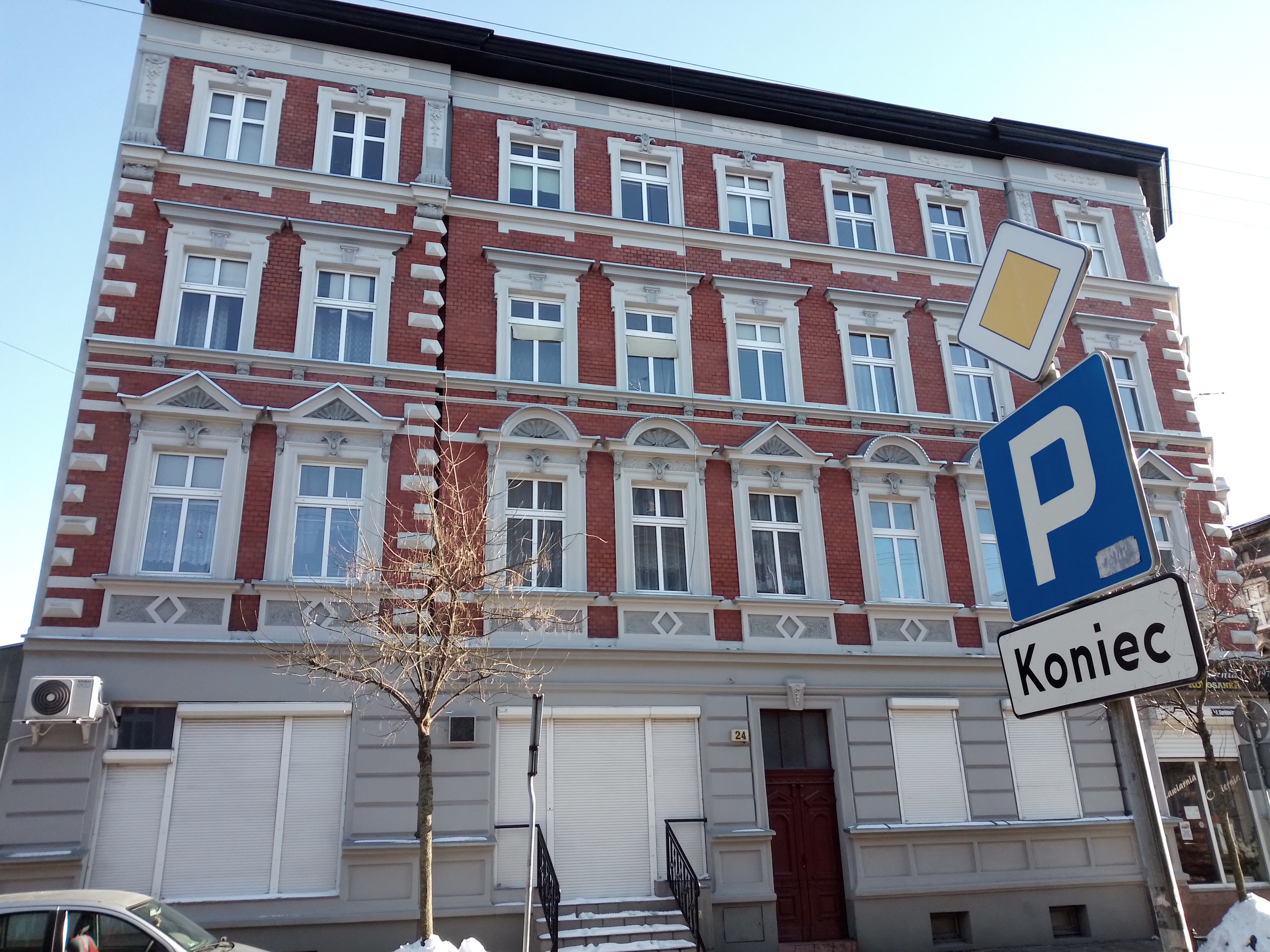
Elevation on Sienkiewicza street

=== Tenement at 20 Chrobrego street, corner with Sienkiewicza street ===
1895-1896

Eclecticism

Carl Juncker, a rentier, was listed as the first landlord of this corner building.

Restored in 2020, its features now include a corner pediment with an adorned tympanum, various other pediments, balustrades, festoons and two superb balconies on Sienkiewicza street.

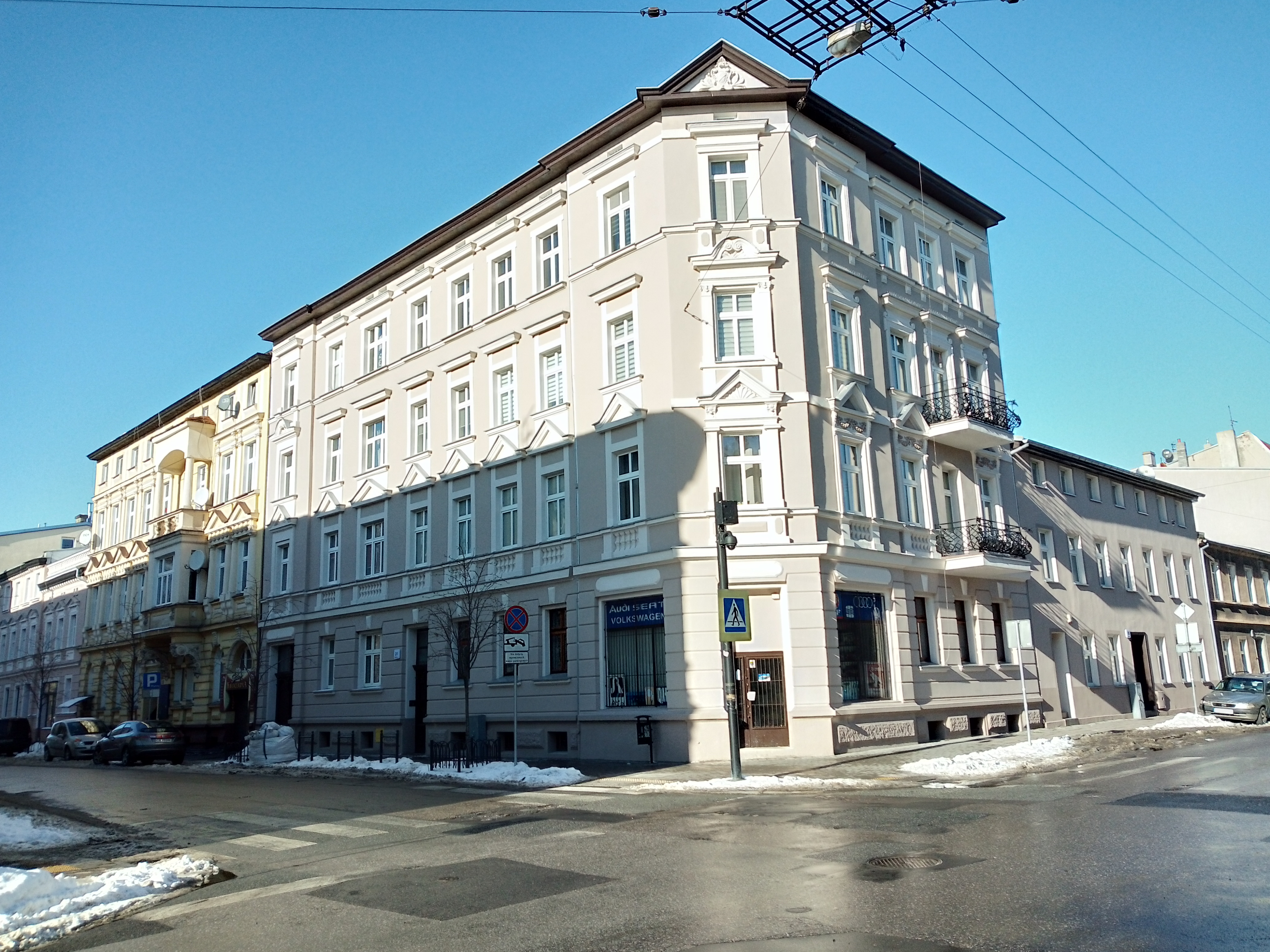
Elevation on both streets after refurbishing

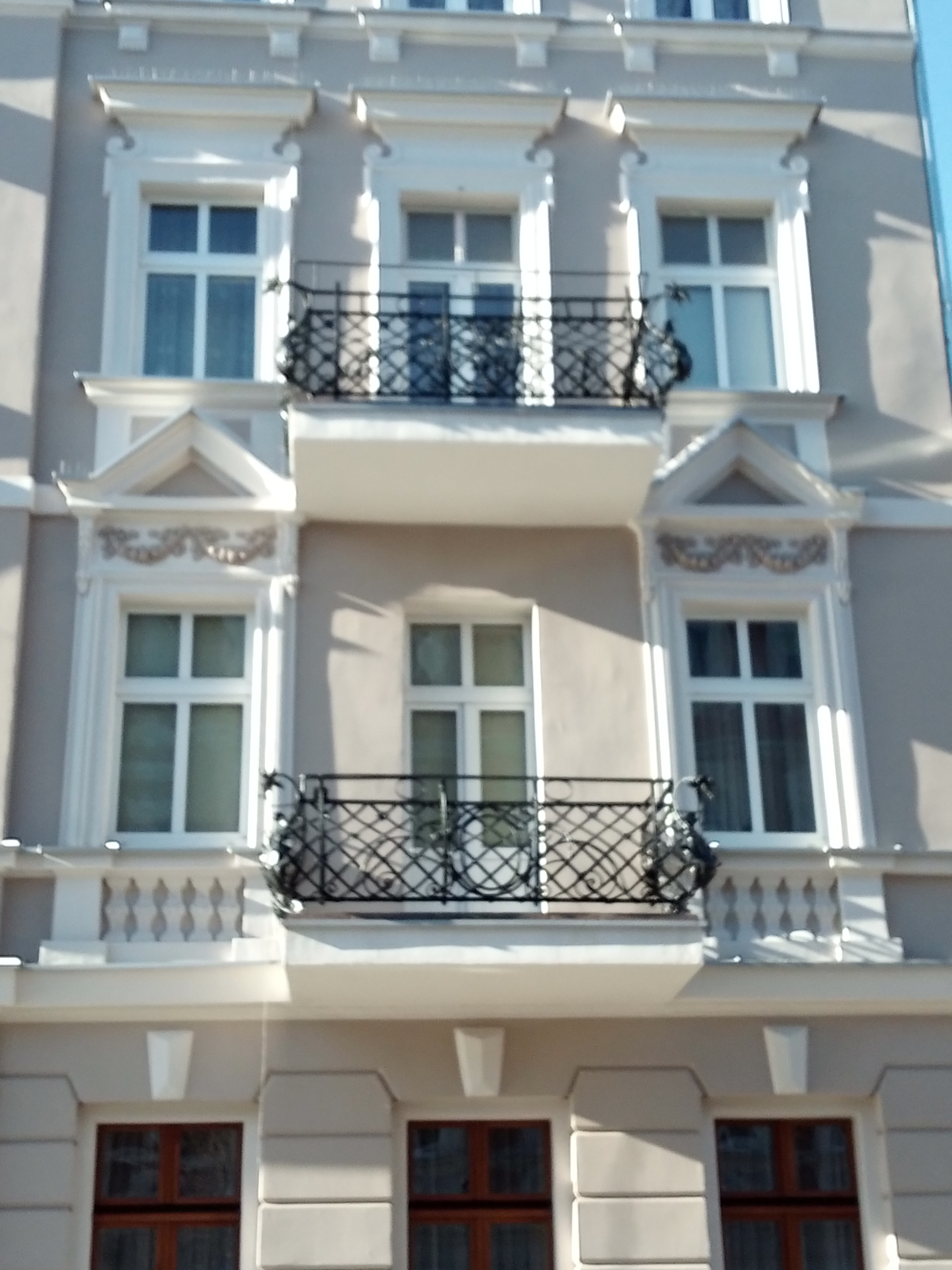
Detail of the balconies

=== Tenement at 29 ===
1875-1900

Eclecticism

The tenement then at "16 Mittelstraße" was first owned by Franz Kretschmer, living at "3 Gammstraße" (now 5 Warmińskiego street).

The facade has lost most of its ornamention.

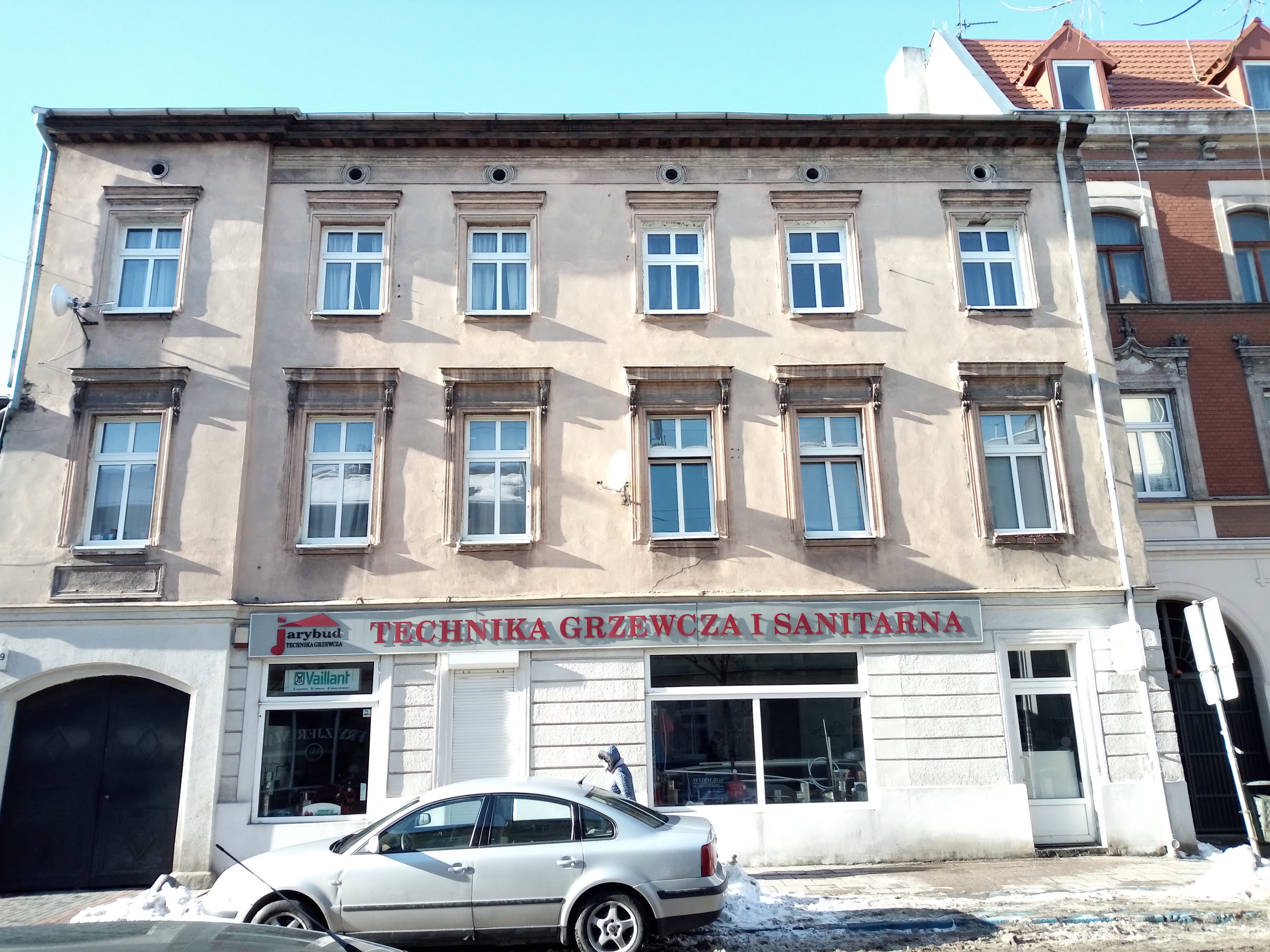
Main elevation

=== Donovang tenement at 30 ===
1911–1912, by Georg Baesler

Art Nouveau, Landhaus architecture

Benno Donovang was an administrative agent and first owner of this tenement at "49/50 Mittelstraße".

The ornamention of the facade displays late Art Nouveau-early modernism characteristics: on one hand, a carved entrance door with a transom light, a cartouche with floral motifs, on the other hand, the use of geometric shapes and long vertical lines.

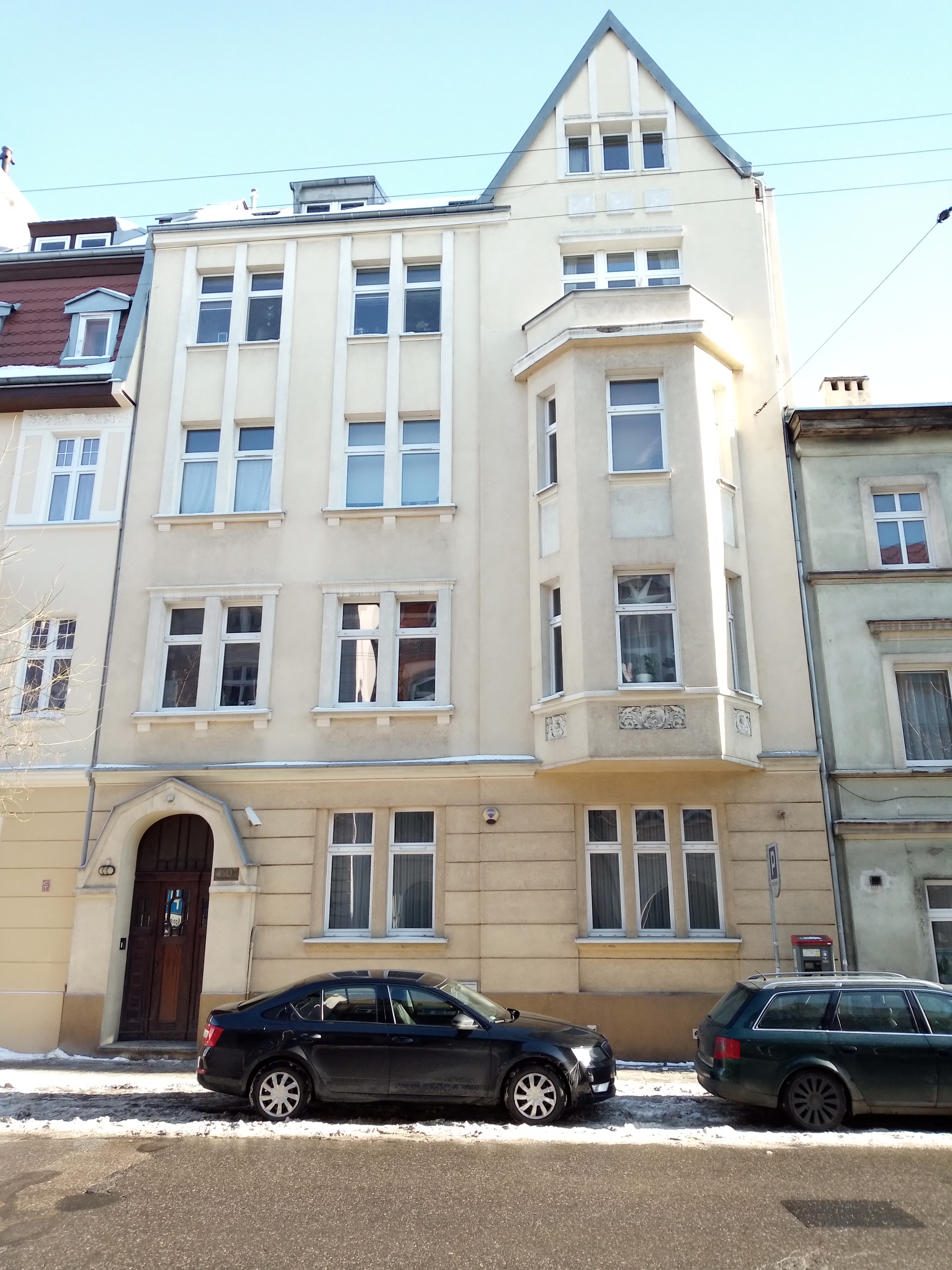
Main elevation

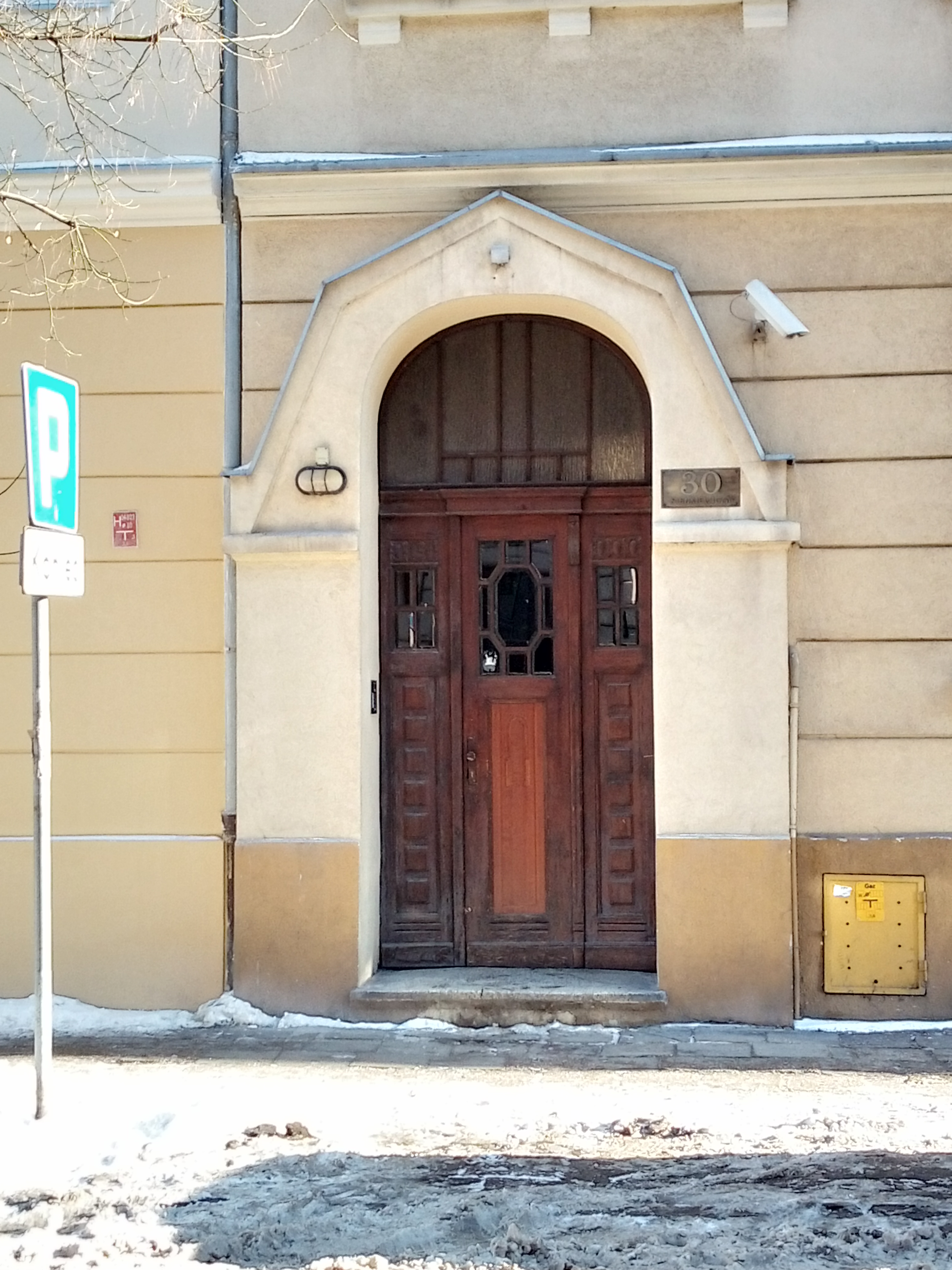
Main door

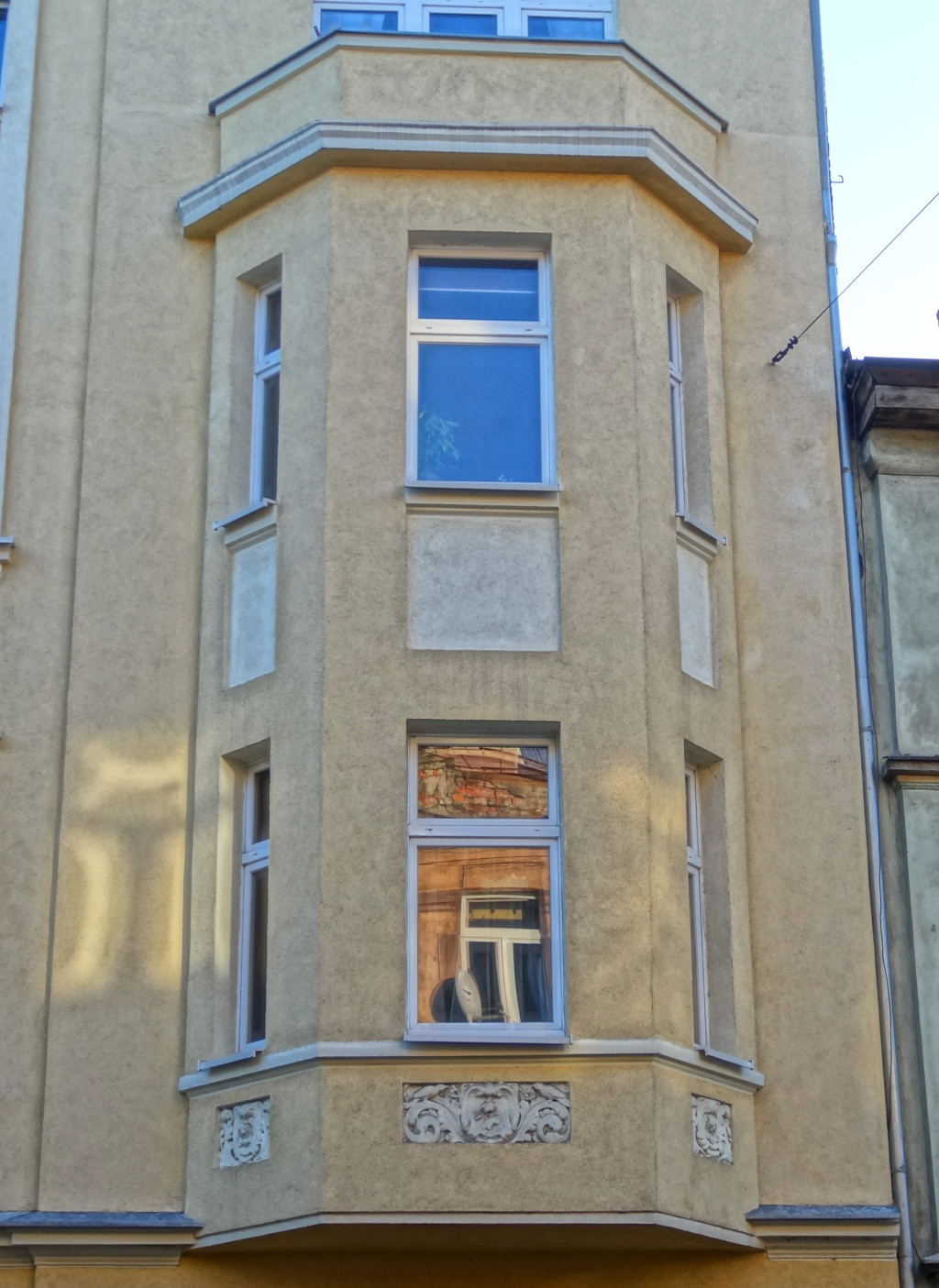
Bay window

=== Building at 31 ===
1875-1900

Eclecticism, German Historicism

The initial landlord was August Dräger, a locksmith.

This tenement stands out among the neighbouring facades by its shape and decoration. The grand avant-corps housing the loggia-entrance with its vaulted shapes is one element of this. Looking closely, one can also make out on the sides an ornamentation of the window lintels and the finials topping the wall gable above the avant-corps.

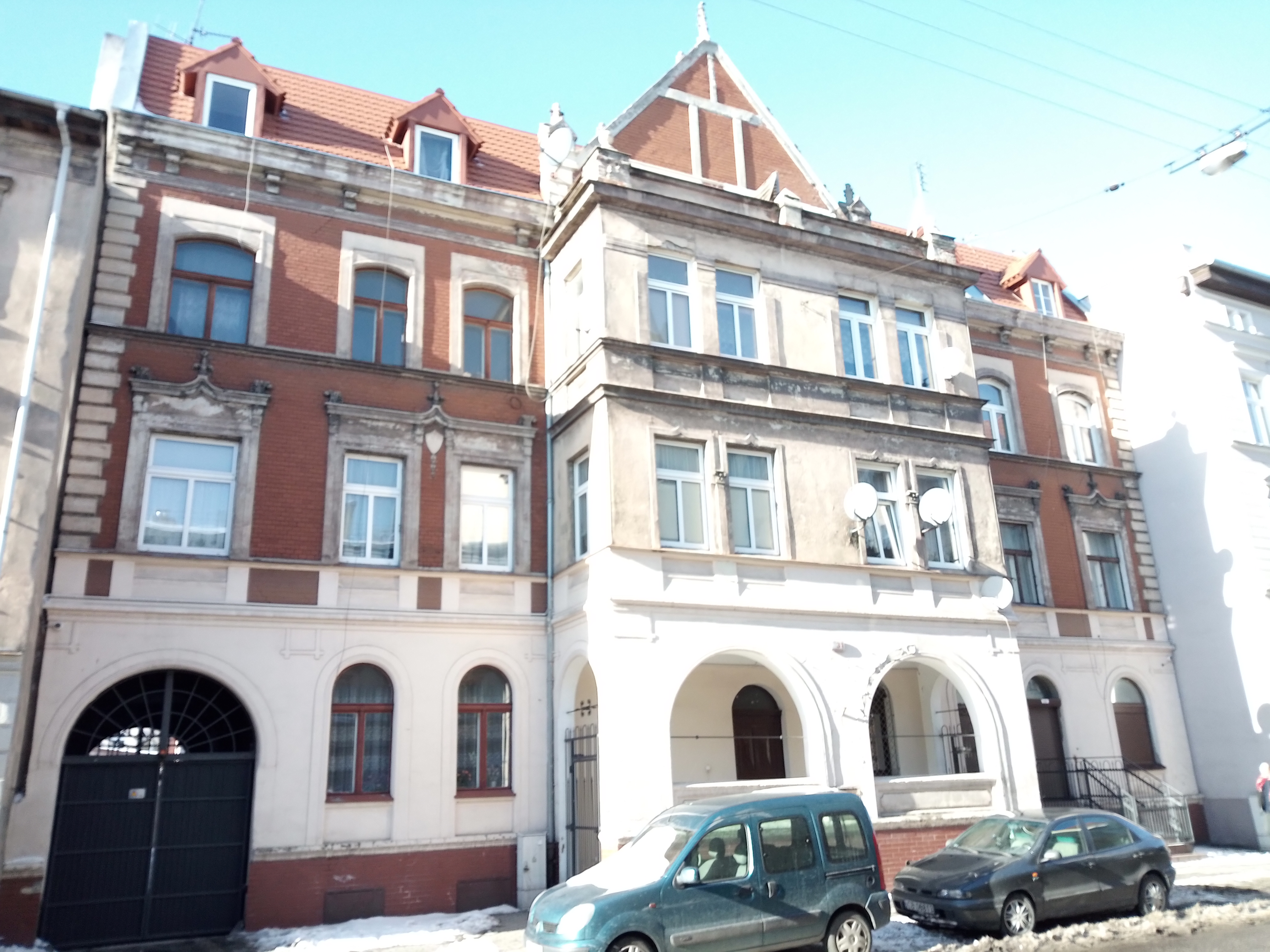
Facade from the street

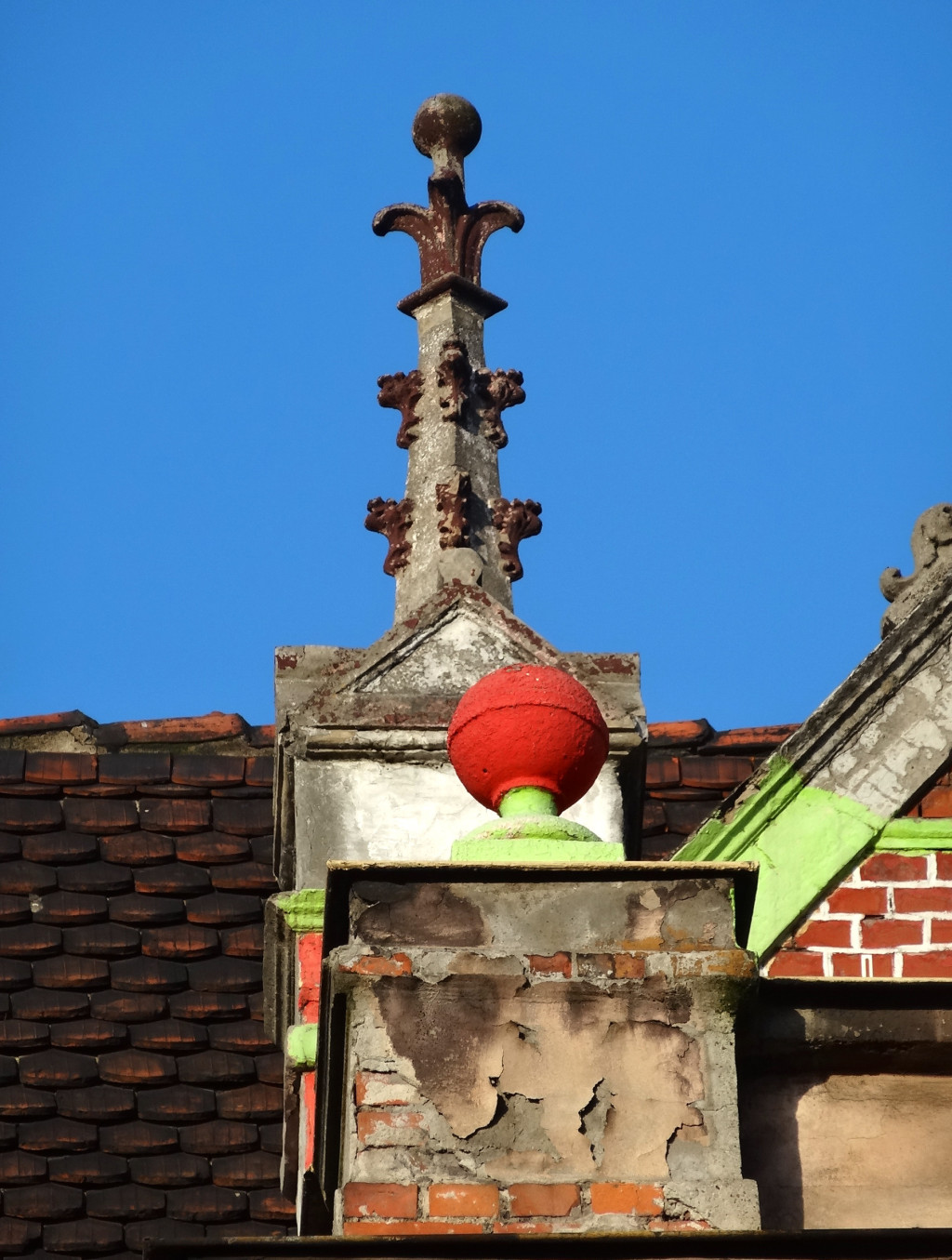
Finial

=== Tenement at 17 Kwiatowa street, corner with Sienkiewicza street ===
1911-1912

Art Nouveau, early Modern architecture

The commissioner of this building was Anton Grabowski, a master metalworker, living at "14 Blumenstraße" (today's 2 Kwiatowa street, house nonexistent).

Renovated in 2020, the building features a bartizan overhanging at the corner, bay windows and numerous stuccoed motifs present in cartouches or on vertical friezes.

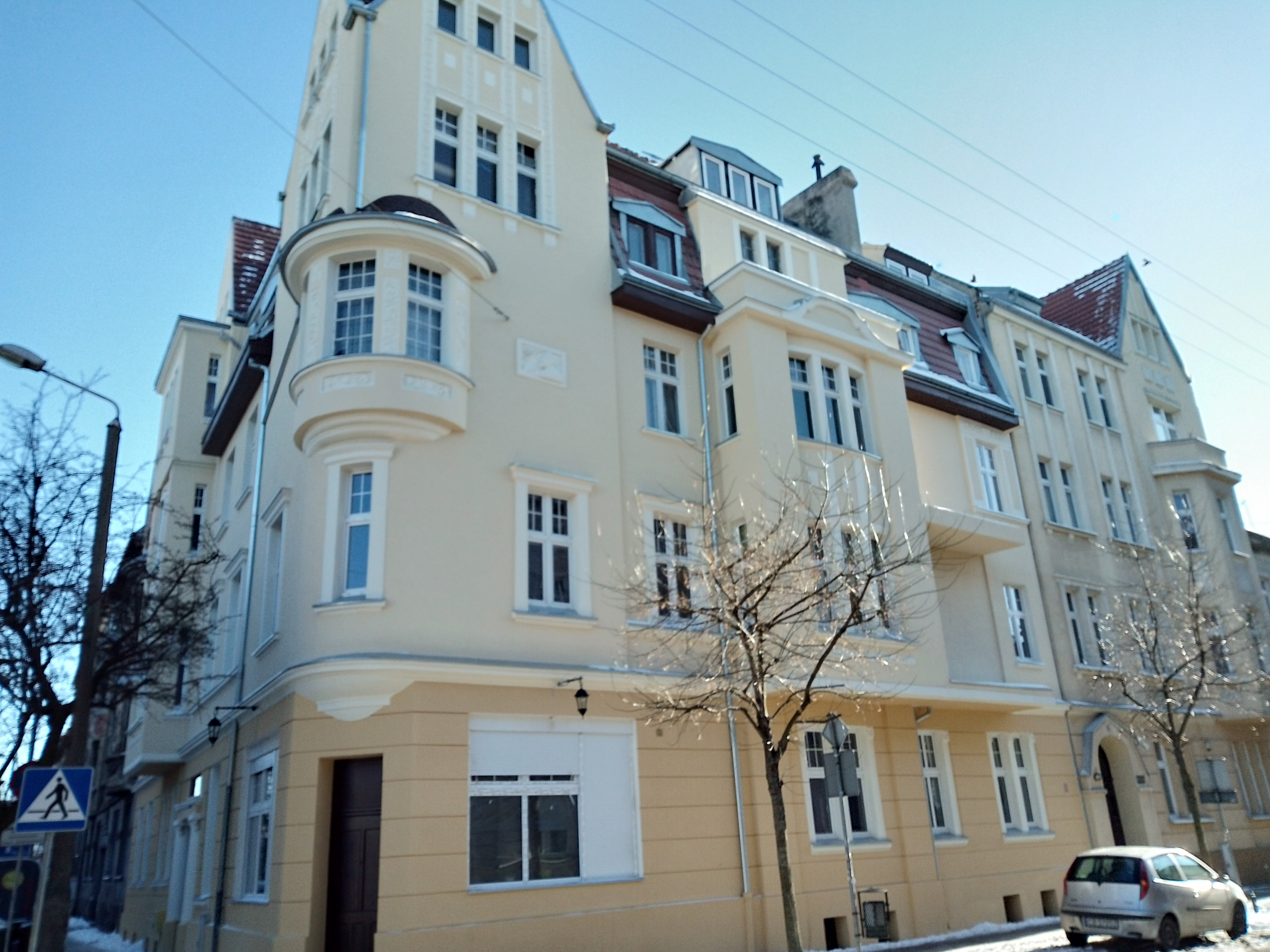
Elevation Sienkiewicza street after refurbishing

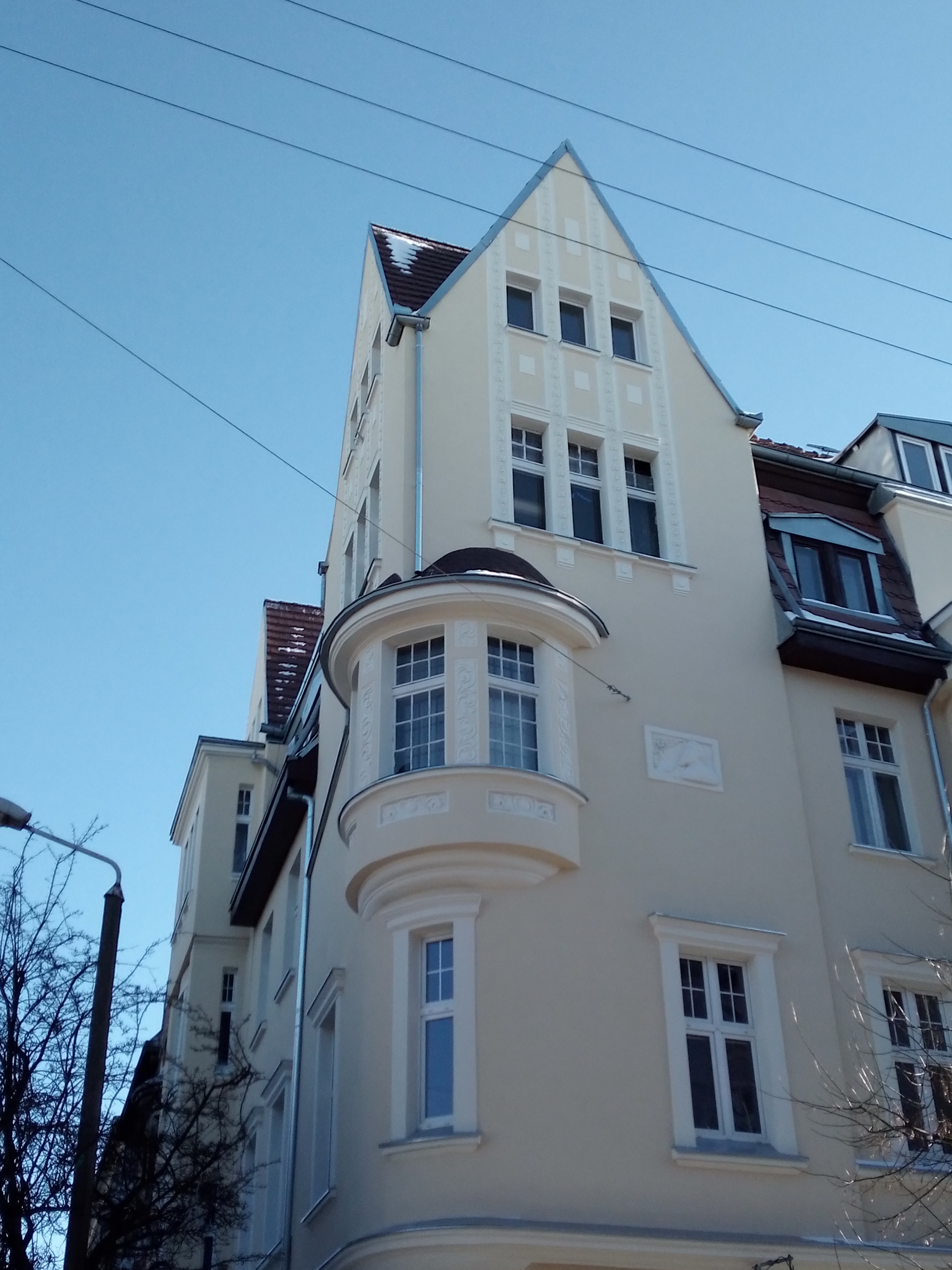
Detail of the bartizan

=== Building at 32, corner with Kwiatowa street ===
1883

Eclecticism

The first landlord was identified as Rudolf Duda, working in the railway business. The house numbering of this plot changed four times: "25 Mittelstraße" (1885), "28 Mittelstraße" (1900), "48 Mittelstraße" (1915) and today's "32 Sienkiewicza street".

A refurbishment completed in 2020 salvaged the elevation, which was in poor technical condition. Furthermore, the facade probably lost its architectural details in the course of earlier works.

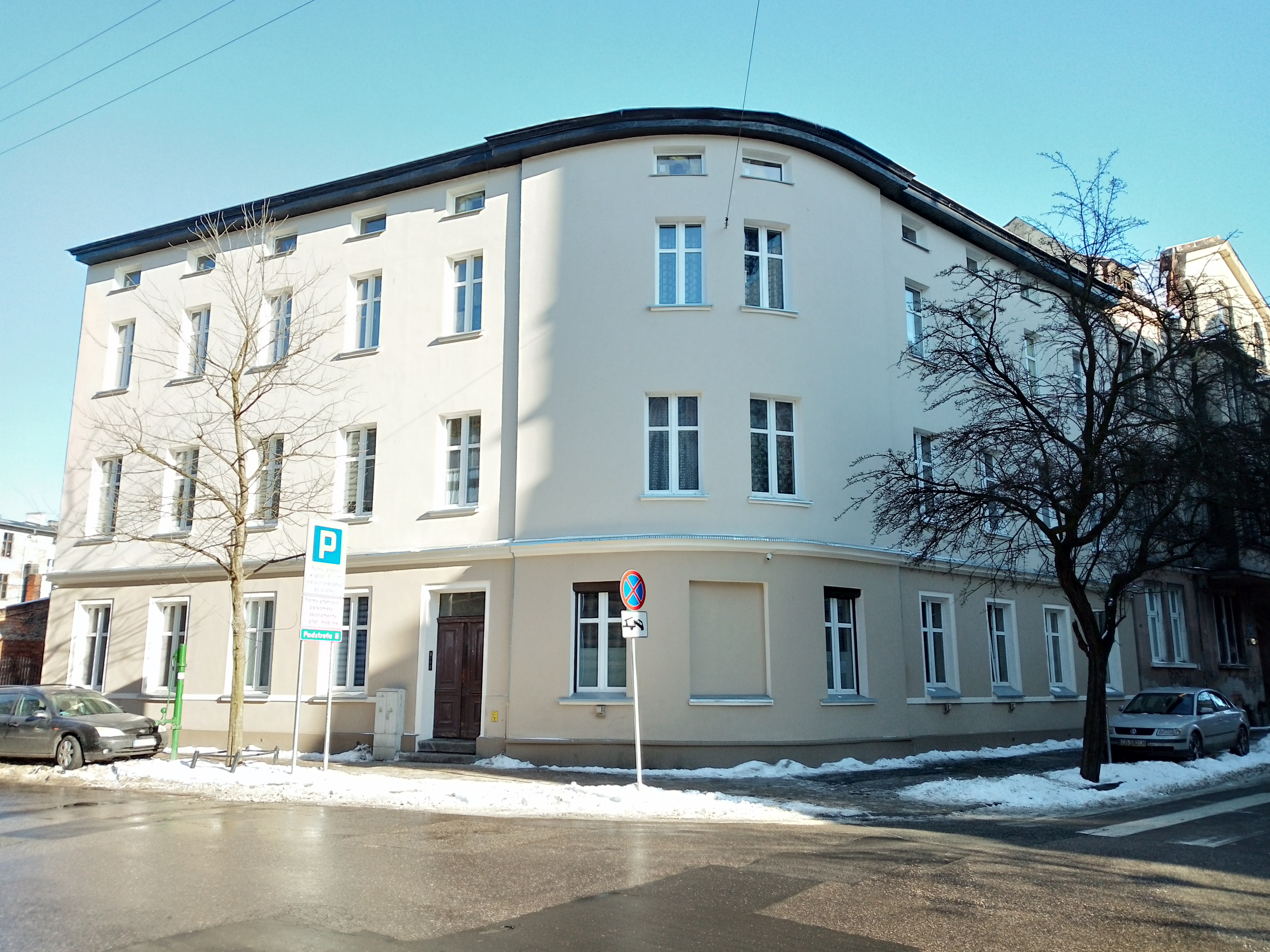
View from the street crossing

=== Building at 33 ===
1890s

Eclecticism

This building was commissioned by Reinhold Wollenberg, working in the trade of timber.

Refit in 2020, the facade exhibits a classical style, reinforced by the presence of two large balconies at each story over the entrance.

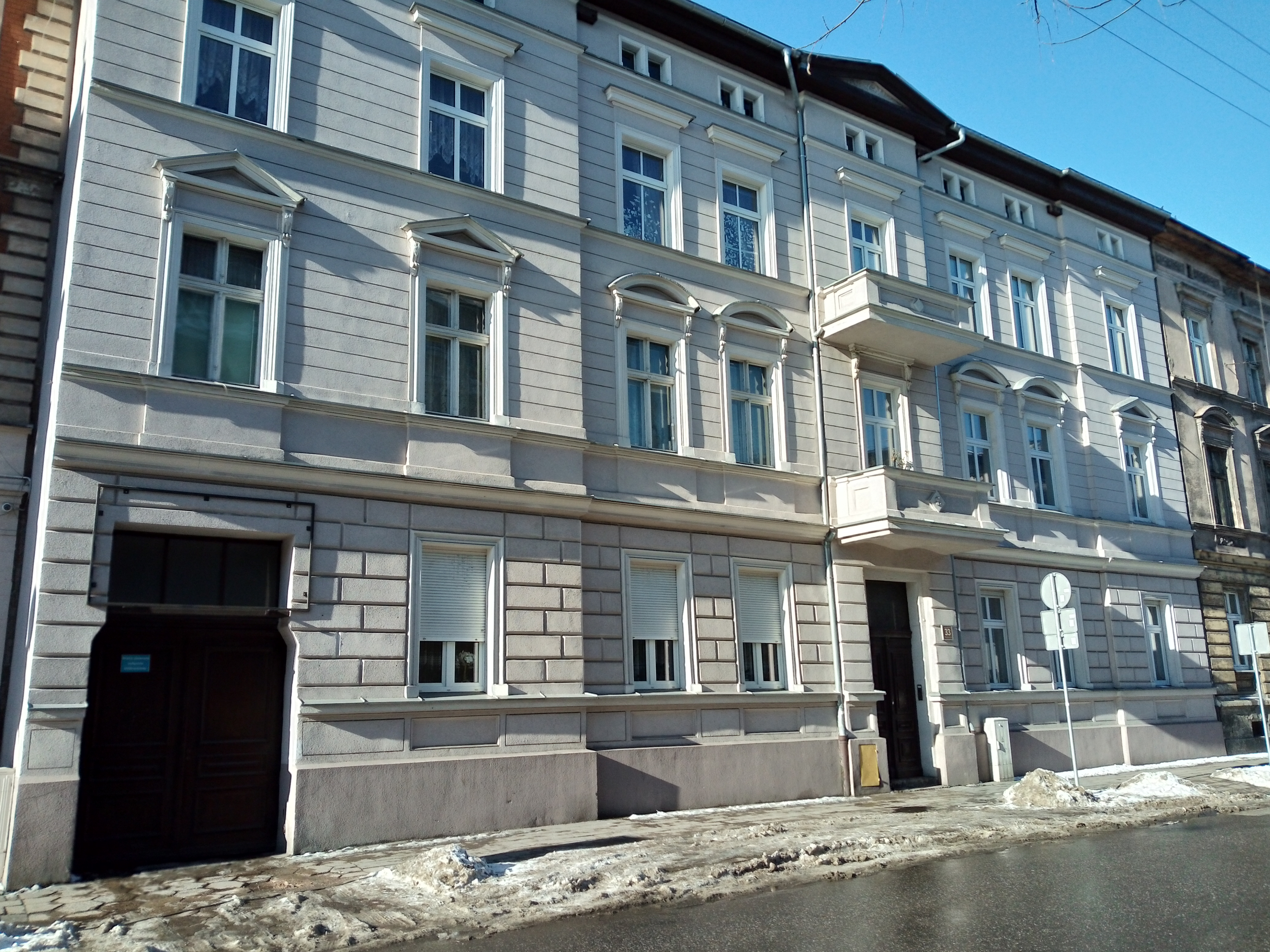
View of the main elevation on the street

=== Building at 35 ===
1890s

Eclecticism

The building at then "19 Mittelstraße" was the propriety of a telegraph assistant, Hermann Thomas.

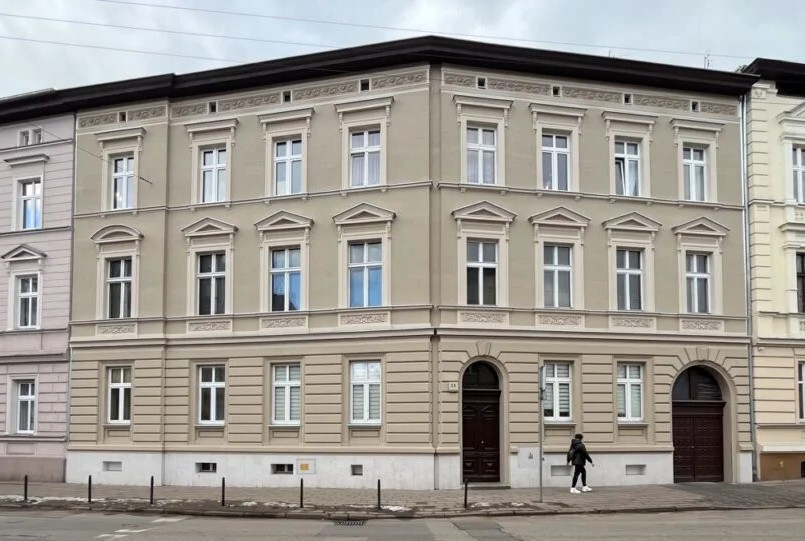
View of both elevations on the street

=== Building at 36 ===
1890

Eclecticism

Registered in 1890 at "26 Mittelstraße", the owner was listed as Mrs Stepanski or Szczepanski, a widow.

The plain brick elevation on the street has kept many original details, from the mascaron above the entrance to the stucco-adorned openings or the decorated cartouches.

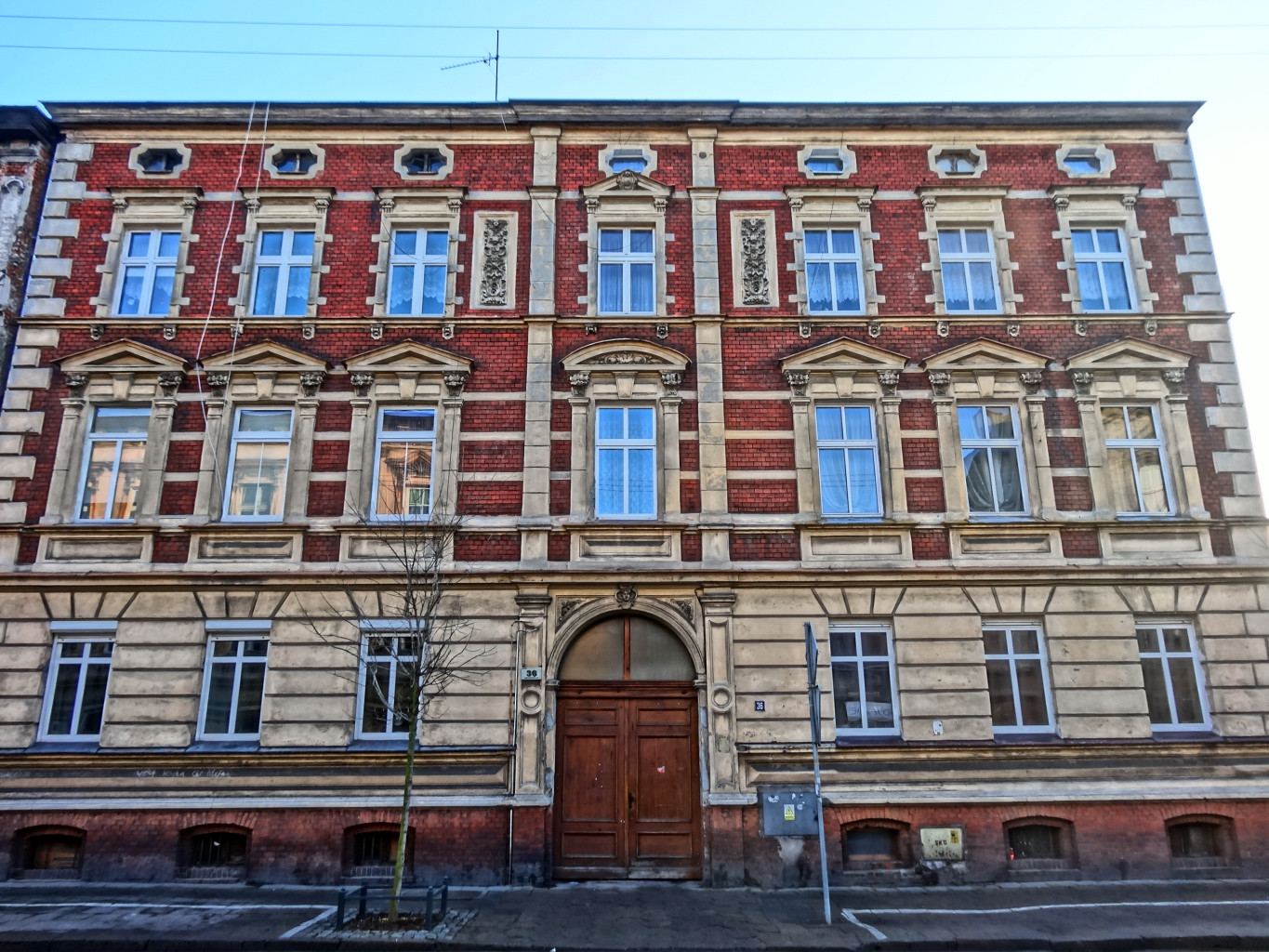
Main elevation

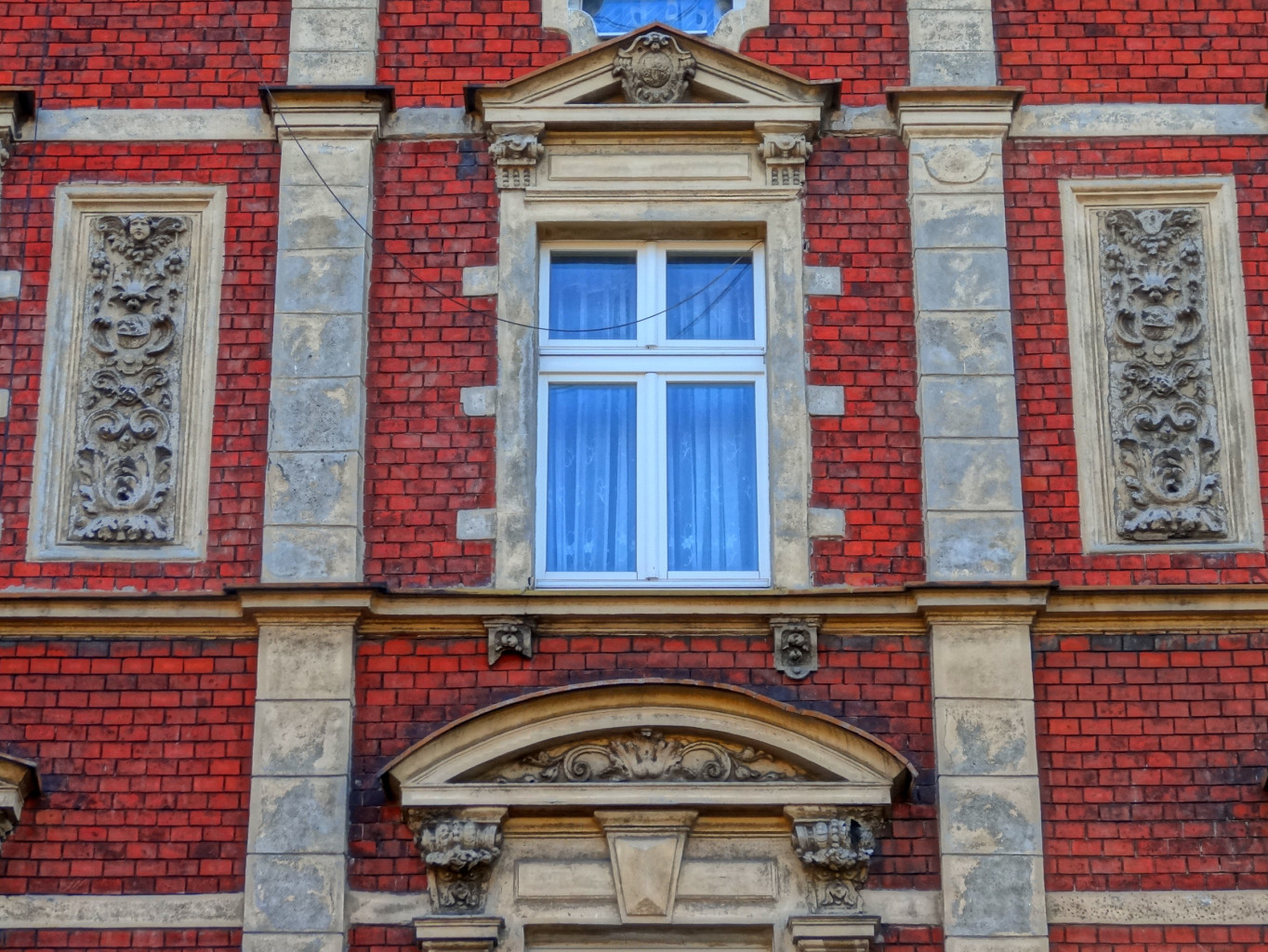
Decoration details

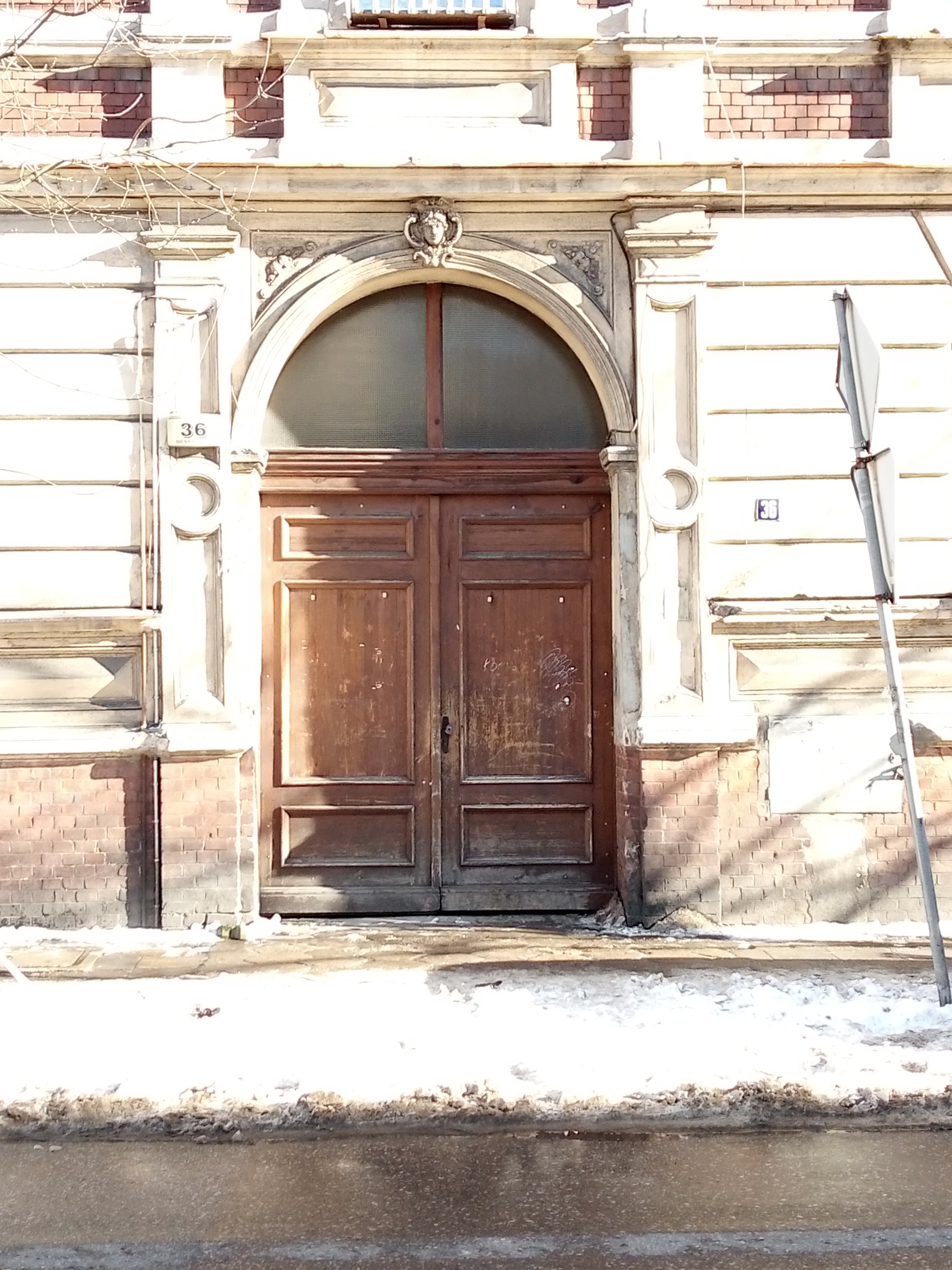
Street entrance door

=== Friedrich Lork tenement at 37 ===
1880s

Eclecticism

Friedrich Lork rented out rooms in this building. His family kept ownership of this tenement till the start of the second world war.

Similar to the building at Nr.35, the facade draws attention due to its portal, topped by a decorated oeil-de-boeuf.

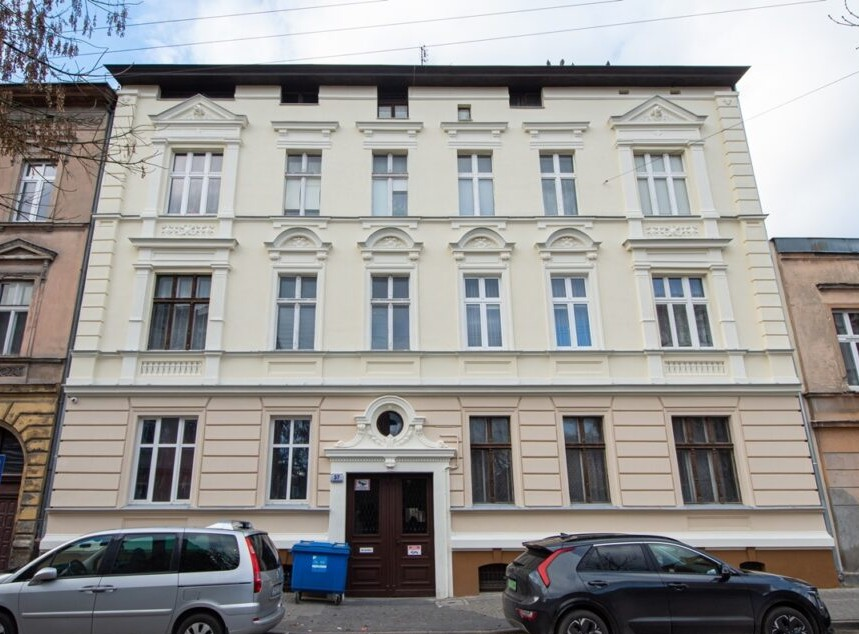
Frontage on the street

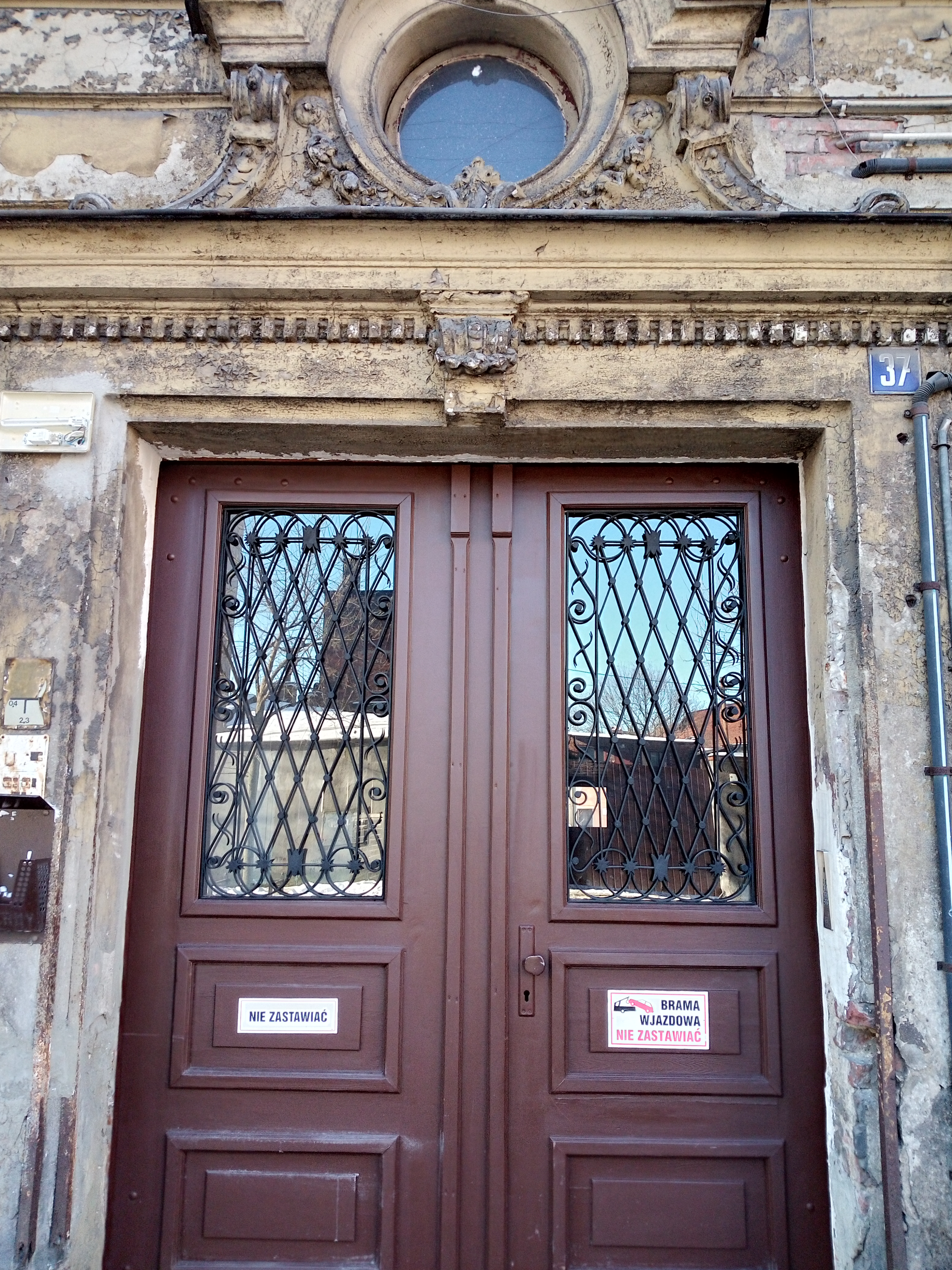
Street entrance door

=== Building at 38, corner with 17 Mazowiecka street ===
1890s

Eclecticism

Marian Rudnicki, a merchant, commissioned this tenement. Its plot received three different house numberings: "25 Mittelstraße" in the 1890s, "45 Mittelstraße" (1915) and "38 Sienkiewicza street" in the present.

The corner building, in need of restoration, still possesses entrance door decoration, with pilasters flanking the side and a triangular pediment filled with plastered floral motifs and a smiling figure head. This ensemble is replicated on the door opening on Mazowiecka street.

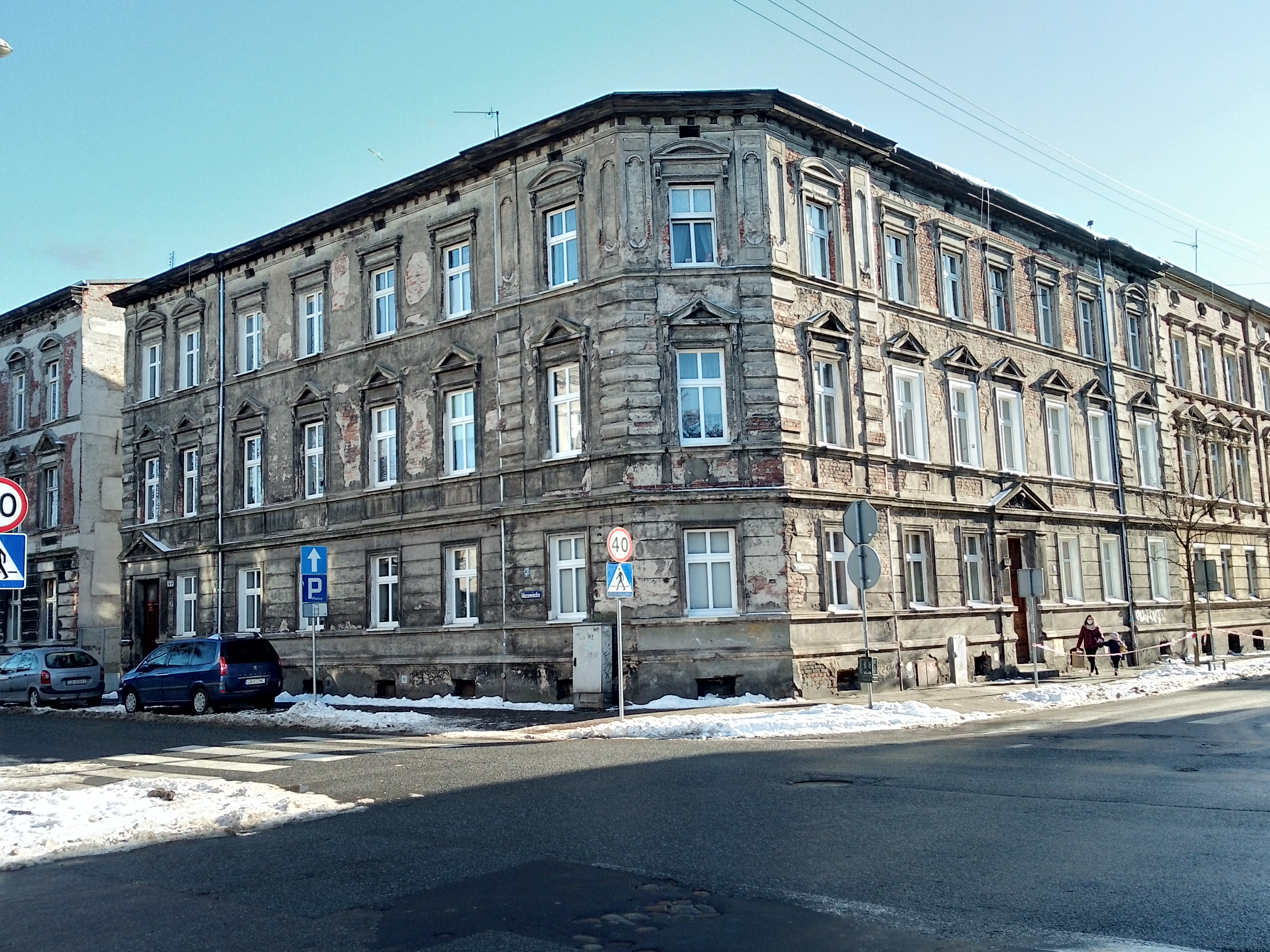
View of both facades

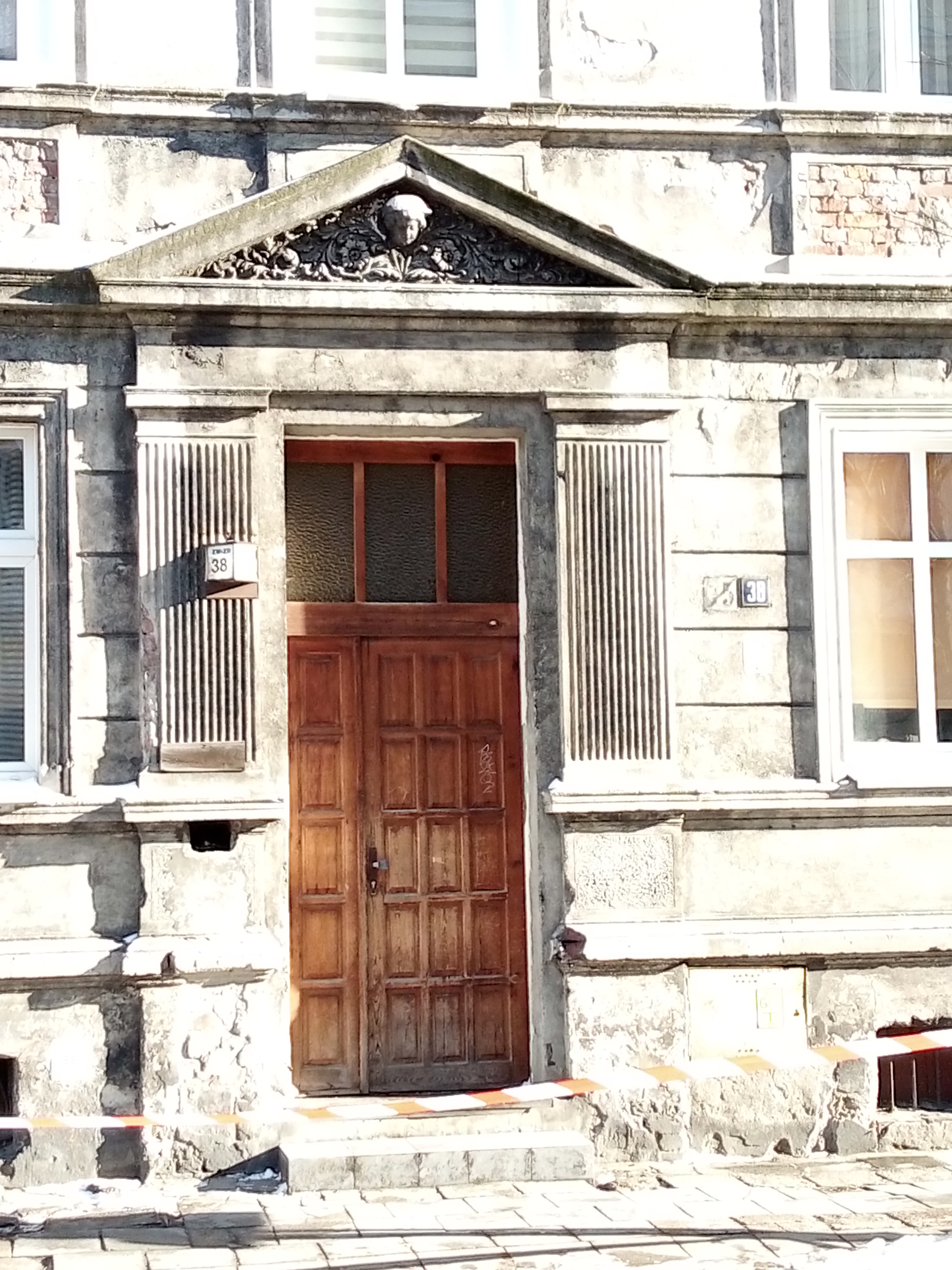
Detail of the door adornment.

=== Building at 40, corner with Mazowiecka street ===
1890

Eclecticism

Carl Heller, a butcher, was the registered landlord of this tenement at its construction.

The house, renovated in the 2010s, exhibits a balcony on the corner narrow facade. There are also stucooed corbels on the window lintel and the corbel table running beneath the roof.

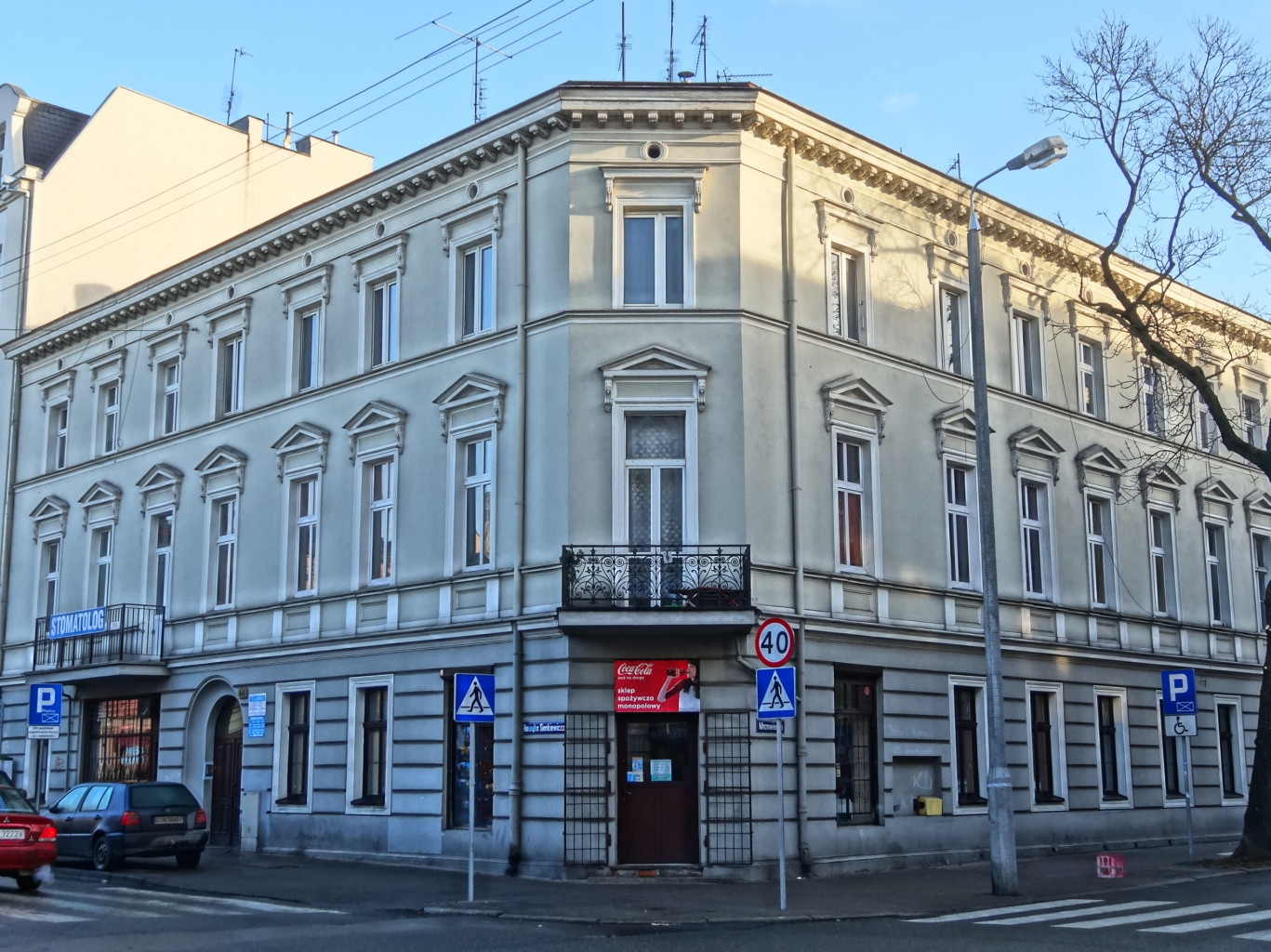
View of both facades

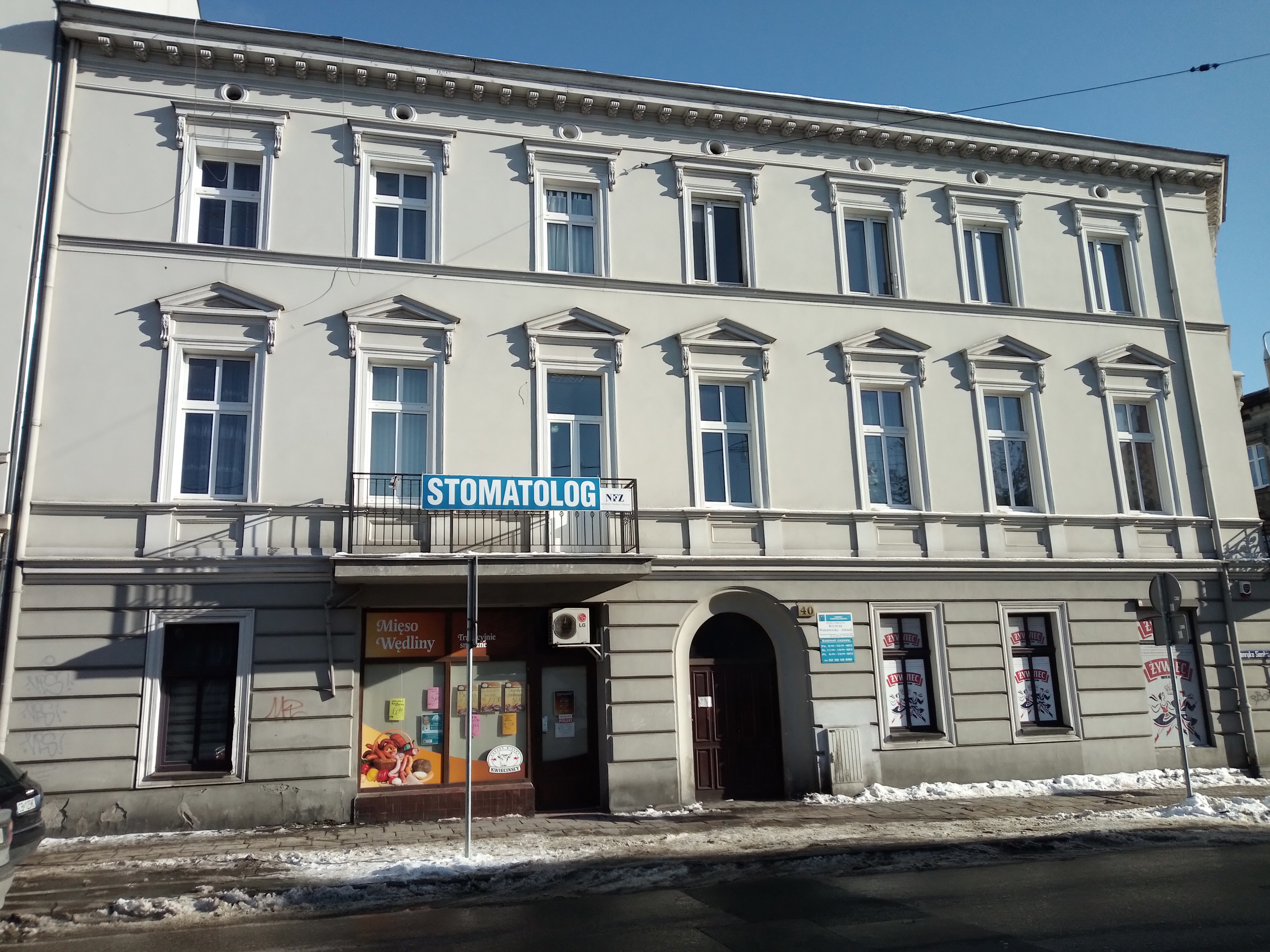
Elevation on Sienkiewicza

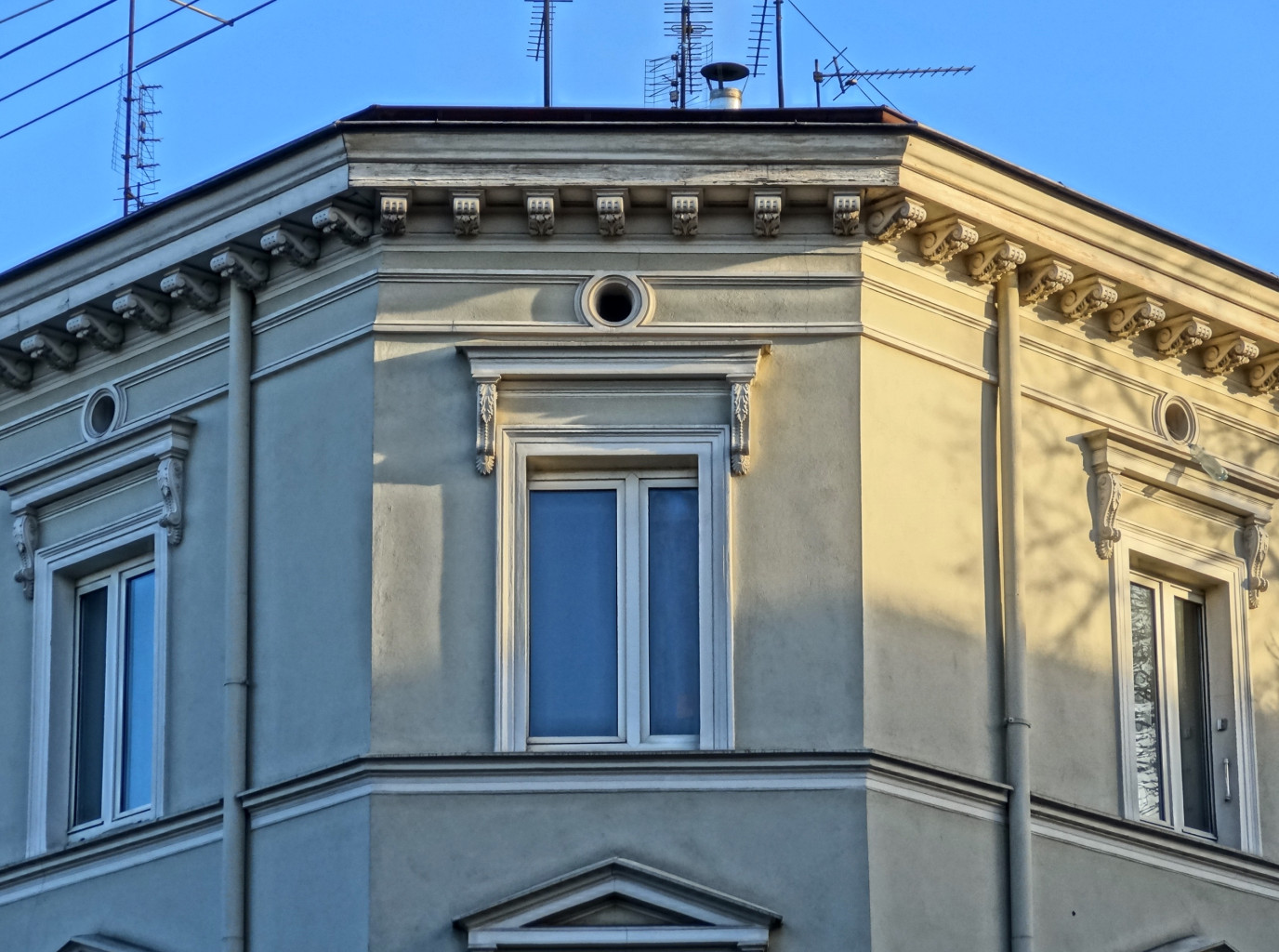
Corbel table

=== Building at 41, corner with 19 Mazowiecka street ===
1885

Eclecticism

Hugo Hecht, a merchant, commissioned this house. He was an important investor in the city: at the end of the 19th century, in addition to this tenement, he owned three other buildings in Gdańska Street, at 88/90, 92/94 and 96. Hecht was living at "30 Wilhelmstraße" (nonexistent today, in Jagiellońska street).

The renovation carried out in 2020 reinforced the design of its facade. The stories are separated by cornices, the roof is supported by consoles and pediments are incorporated above the windows. Massive balconies are decorated with balustrades and the side garage entrance displays a large wrought iron fence.

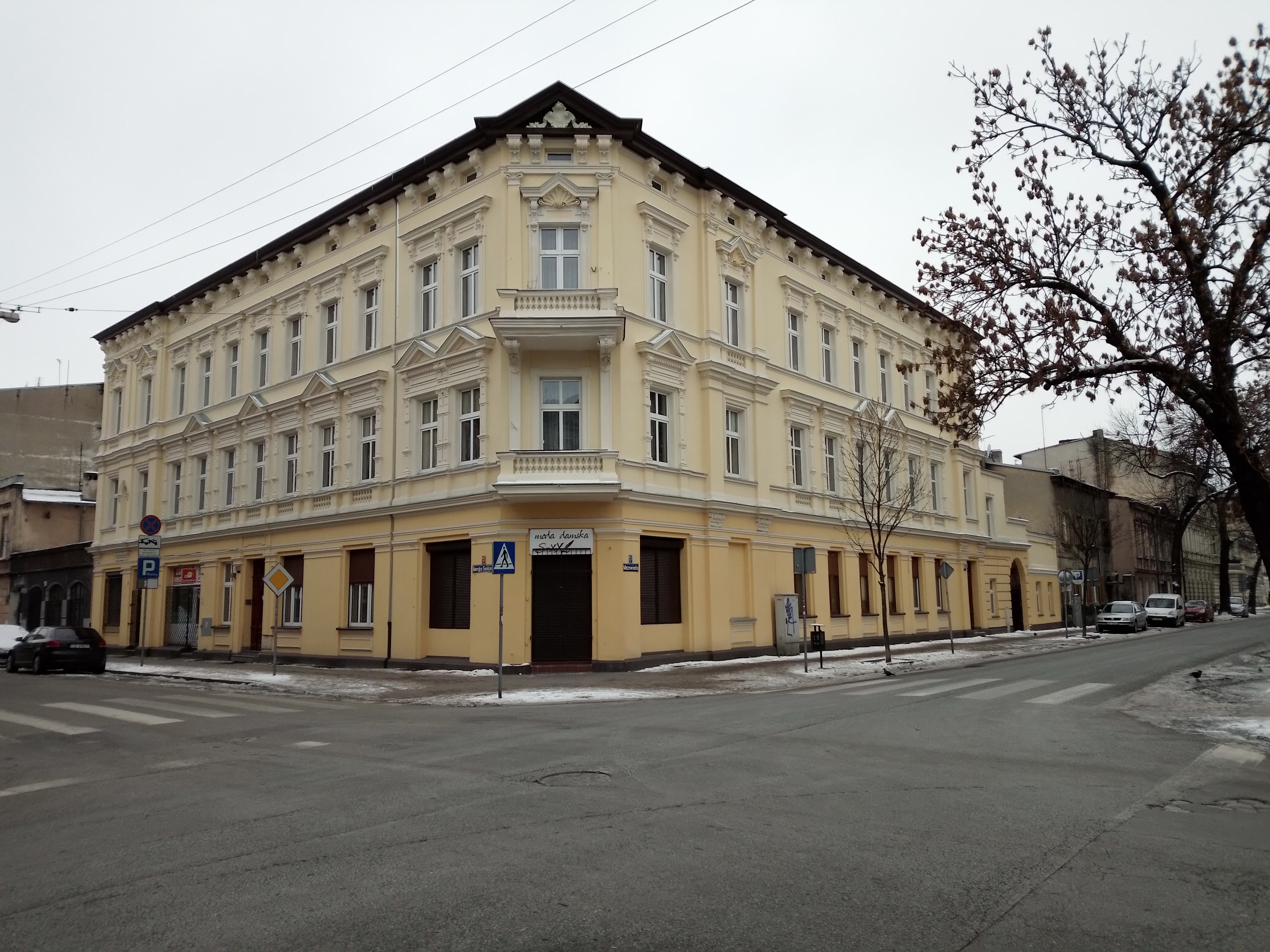
View from street crossing

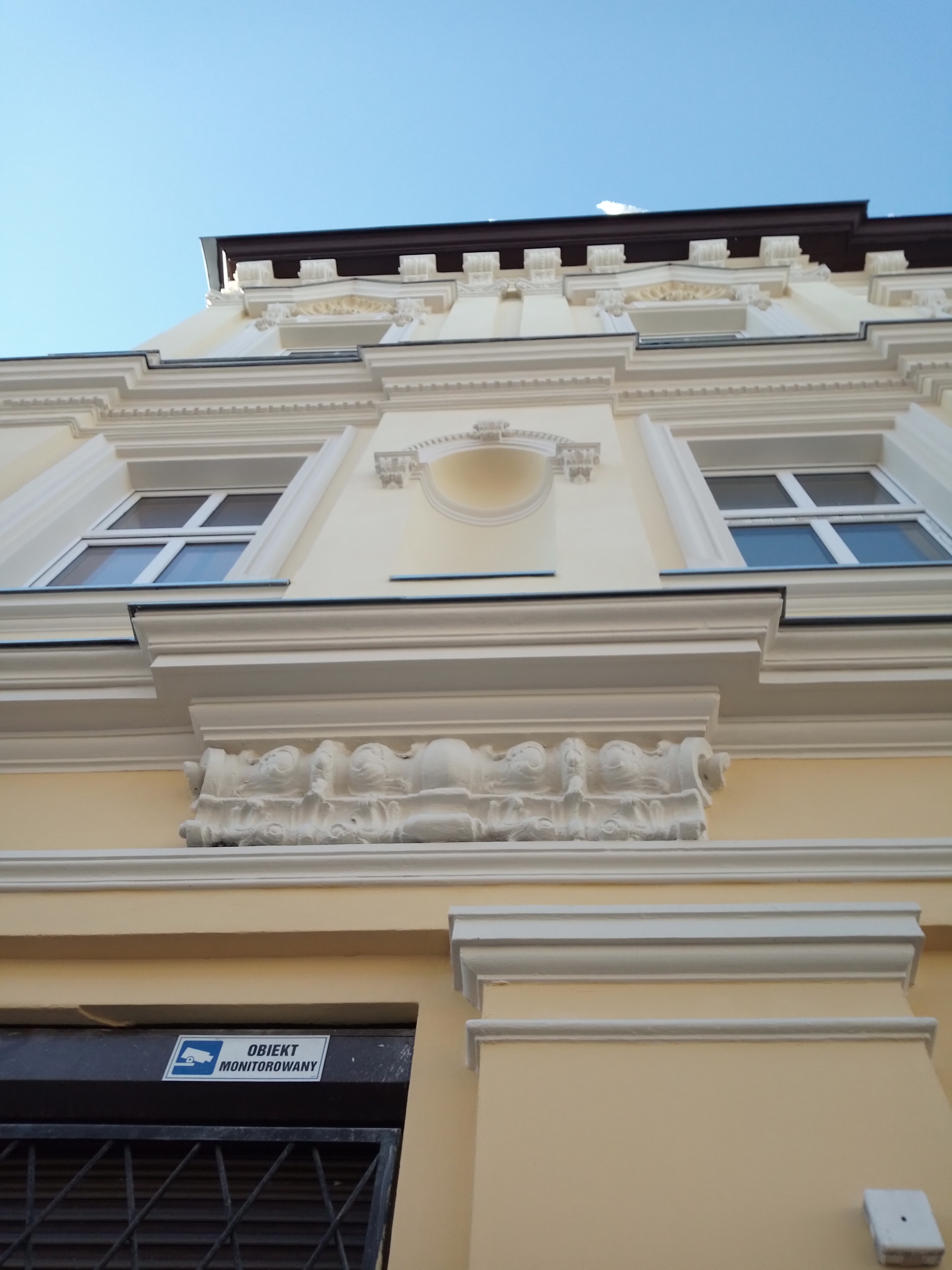
Stuccos details

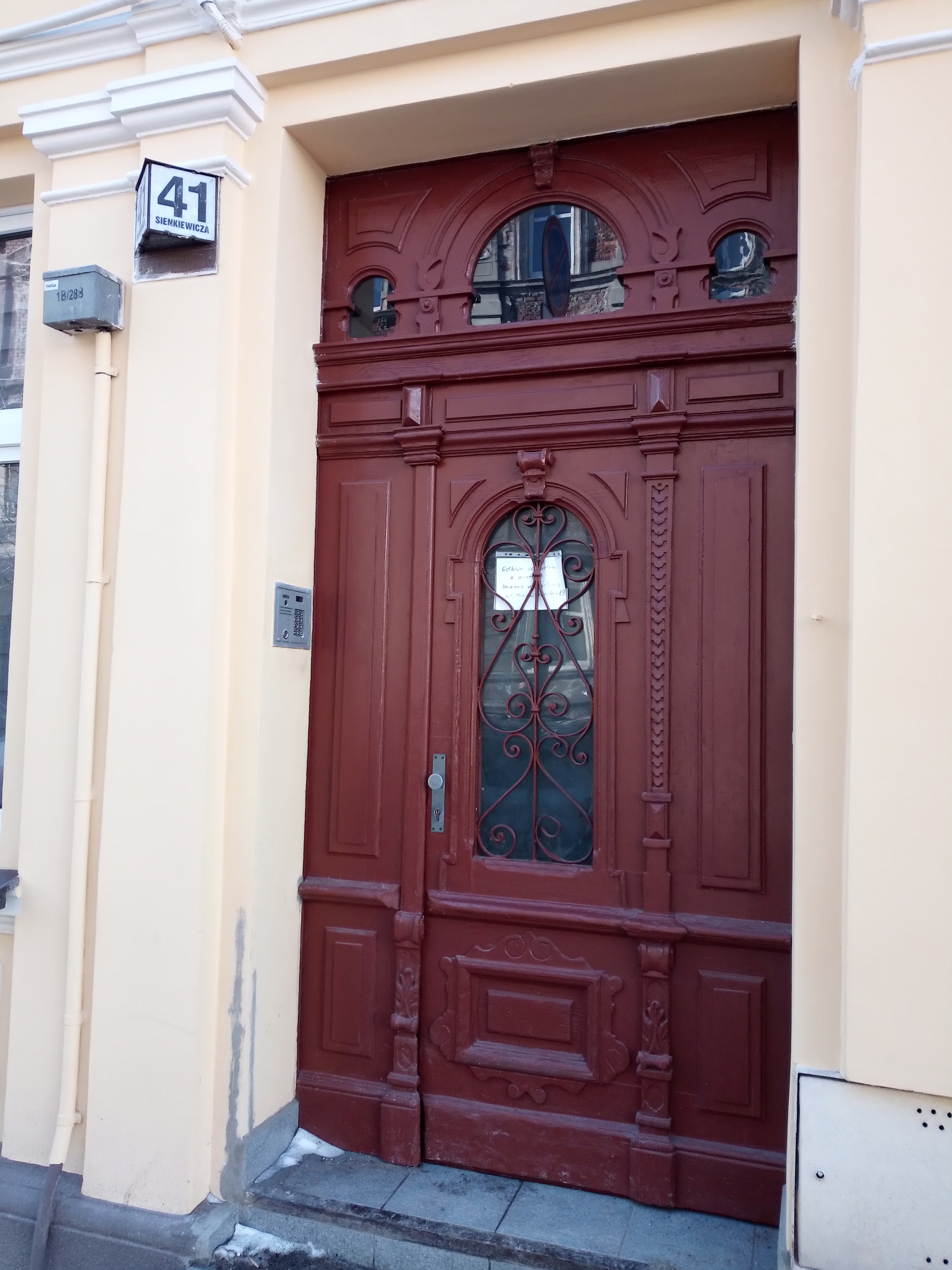
Entrance door

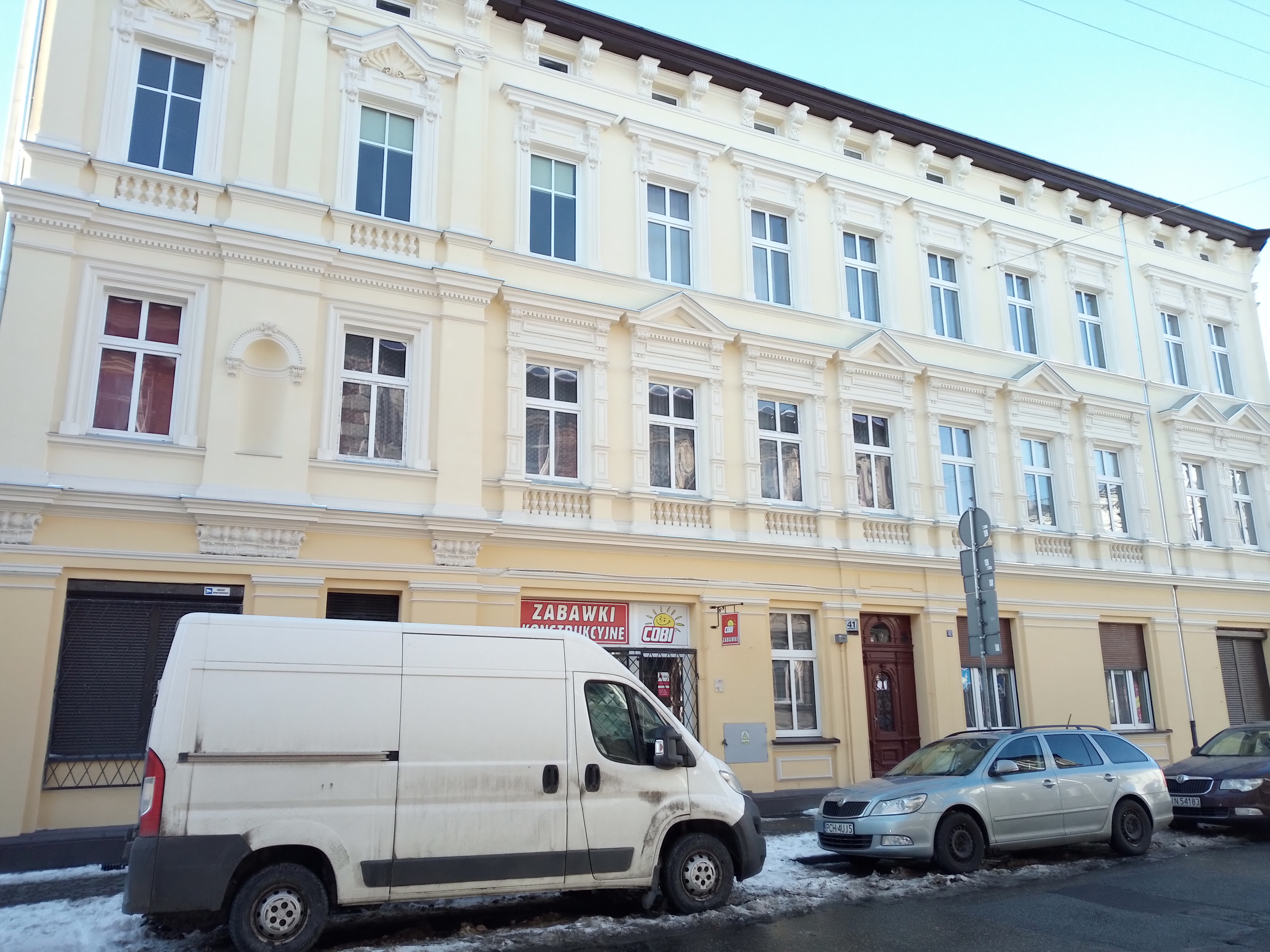
Facade on Sienkiewicza street

=== Tenement at 42, corner with Hetmańska street ===
1915

Early Modern architecture

This building was commissioned by the Housing Association of Bromberg (German: Wohnungsverein Bromberg), a pioneering cooperative established in 1890. At the re-creation of the Polish state, this German association was transferred to the Polish authorities under the name "Bydgoszcz Housing Cooperative" (Polish: Bydgoska Spółdzielnia Mieszkaniowa, BSM).

The flats owned by BSM were spread all over the city, in particular at Chrobrego, Mazowiecka, Hetmańska streets, 13-15 Cieszkowskiego street, 26-28 Garbary Street, 1 Kołłątaja street, 13-17 Krasińskiego street, 2 Szwalbego street, 31-33 and 39-51 Pomorska street or 3-7 Staszica street. At 42 Sienkiewicza, a dozen tenants lived there.

The building's elongated lines, with very few concessions to decoration (except for the wall dormers and the street door) reflect the principles of the then-nascent modernism movement.

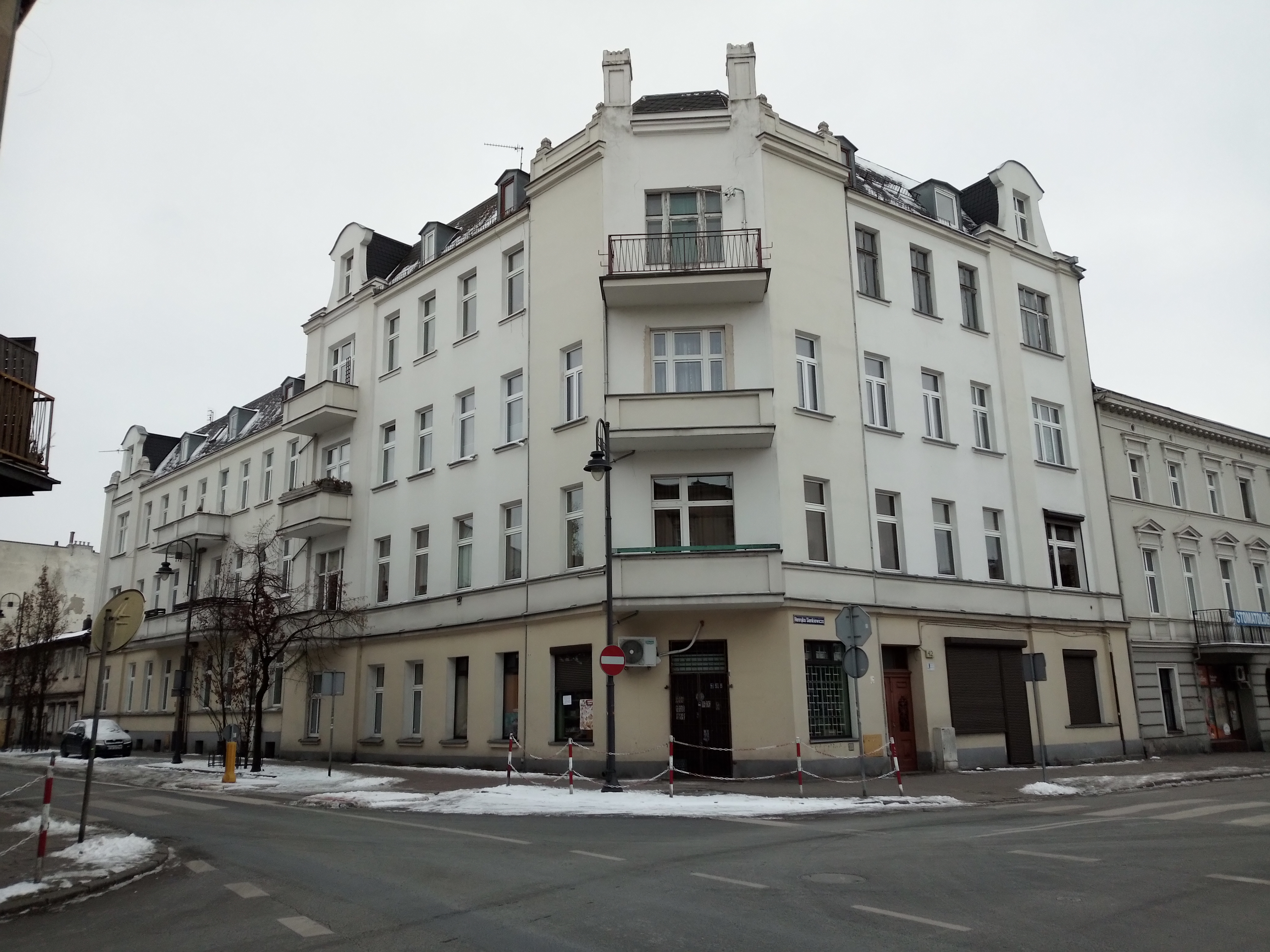
View from street crossing

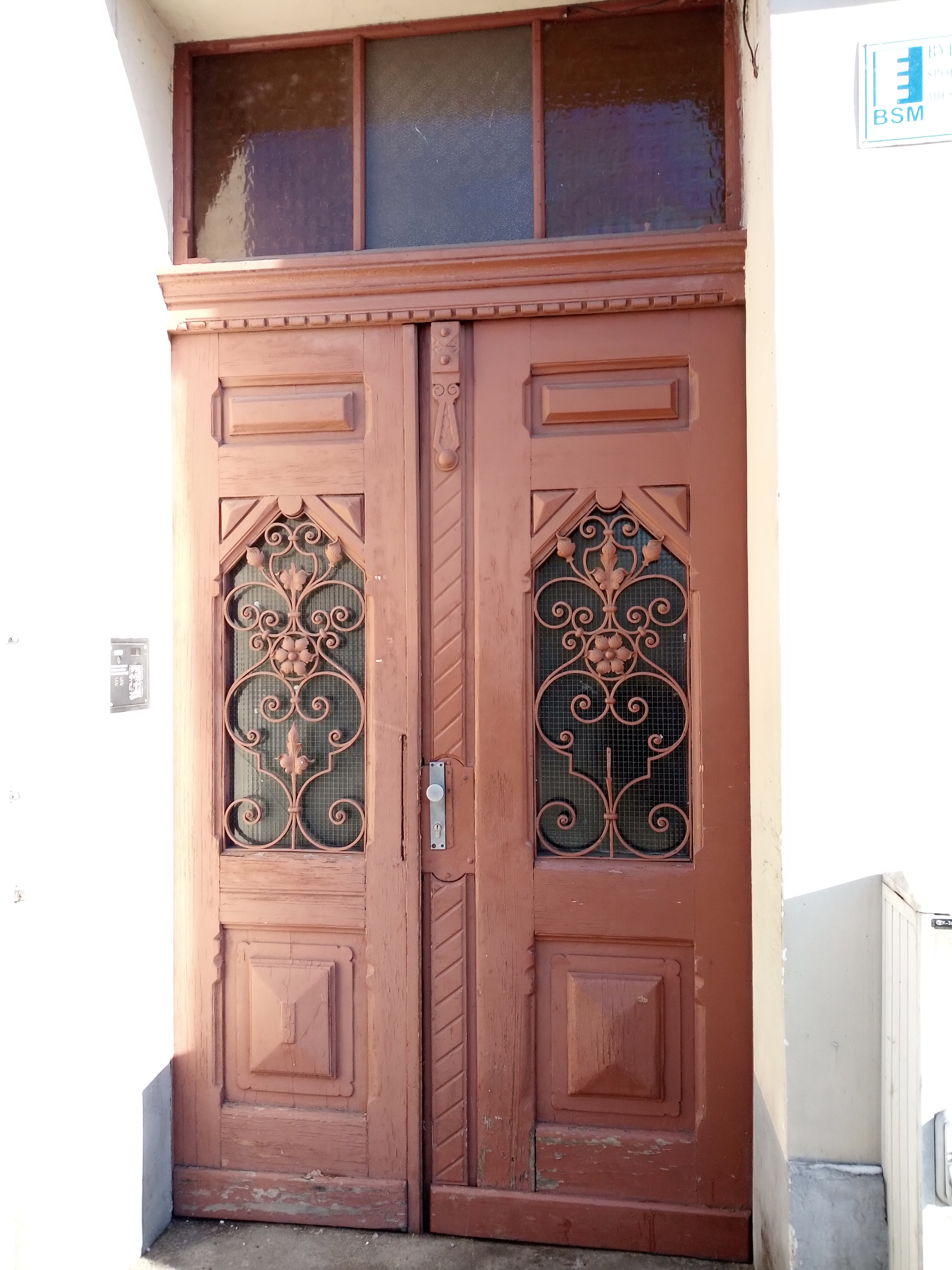
entrance door

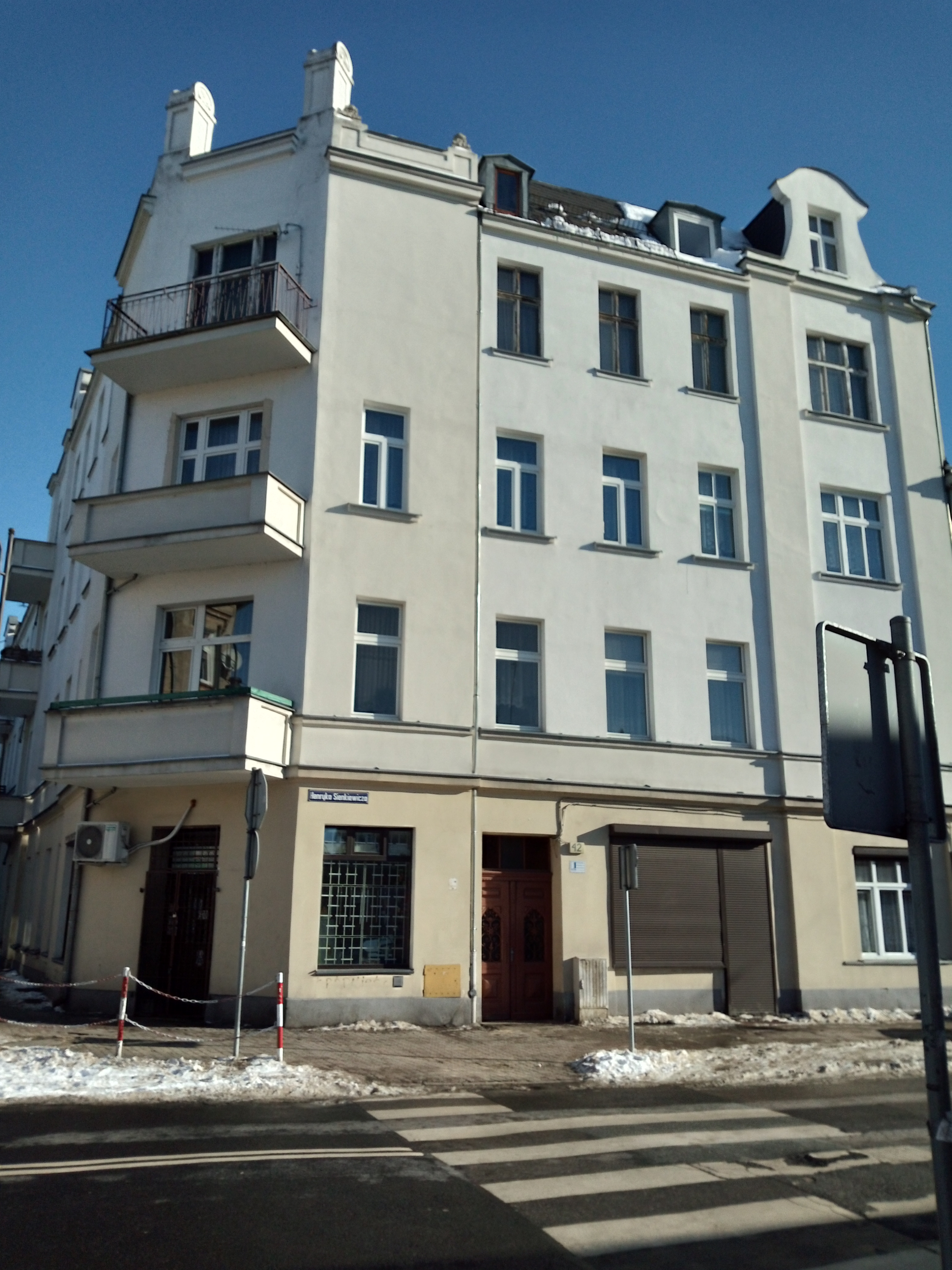
Facade on Sienkiewicza street

=== Tenement at 44, corner with 16 Hetmańska street ===
1878, by Anton Hoffmann

Eclecticism

Carl Heller, a butcher and owner at Nr.40, also owned this building. Upon his death, his widow Caroline took over its ownership till the turn of the 20th century.

The initial design was the work of the local architect Anton Hoffmann, who also designed other buildings on this street.

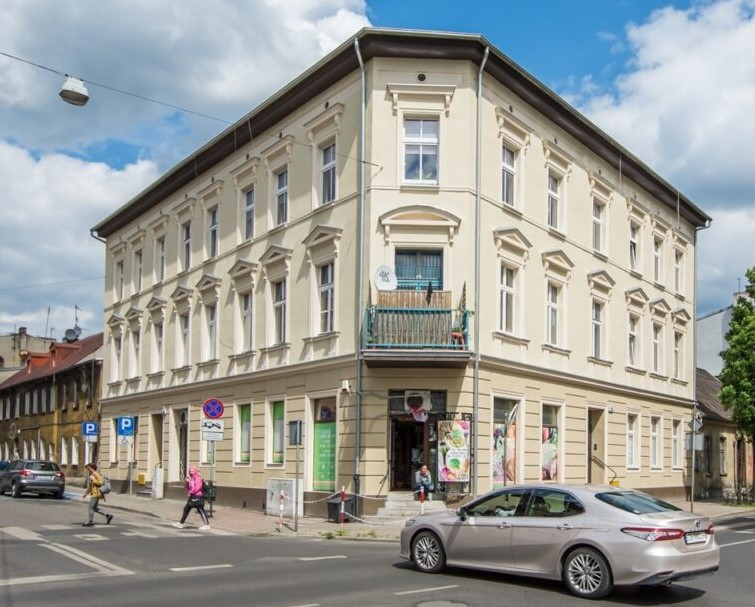
View from the street intersection

This previous plot (Nr.44) marks the farthest development of "Mittelstraße" in the 19th century. The vast majority of the allotments located north of Hetmańska street (then Luisen straße) have only been developed from 1900 onwards. As such, many buildings have been commissioned by investors, sometimes in batches.

=== Tenement at 45 ===
1890s

Eclecticism

This building was commissioned by Benjamin Neumann, a trader in flour. He lived at "2 Wörth-straße" (present day Racławicka street).

The elevation on the street displays typical eclectic features.

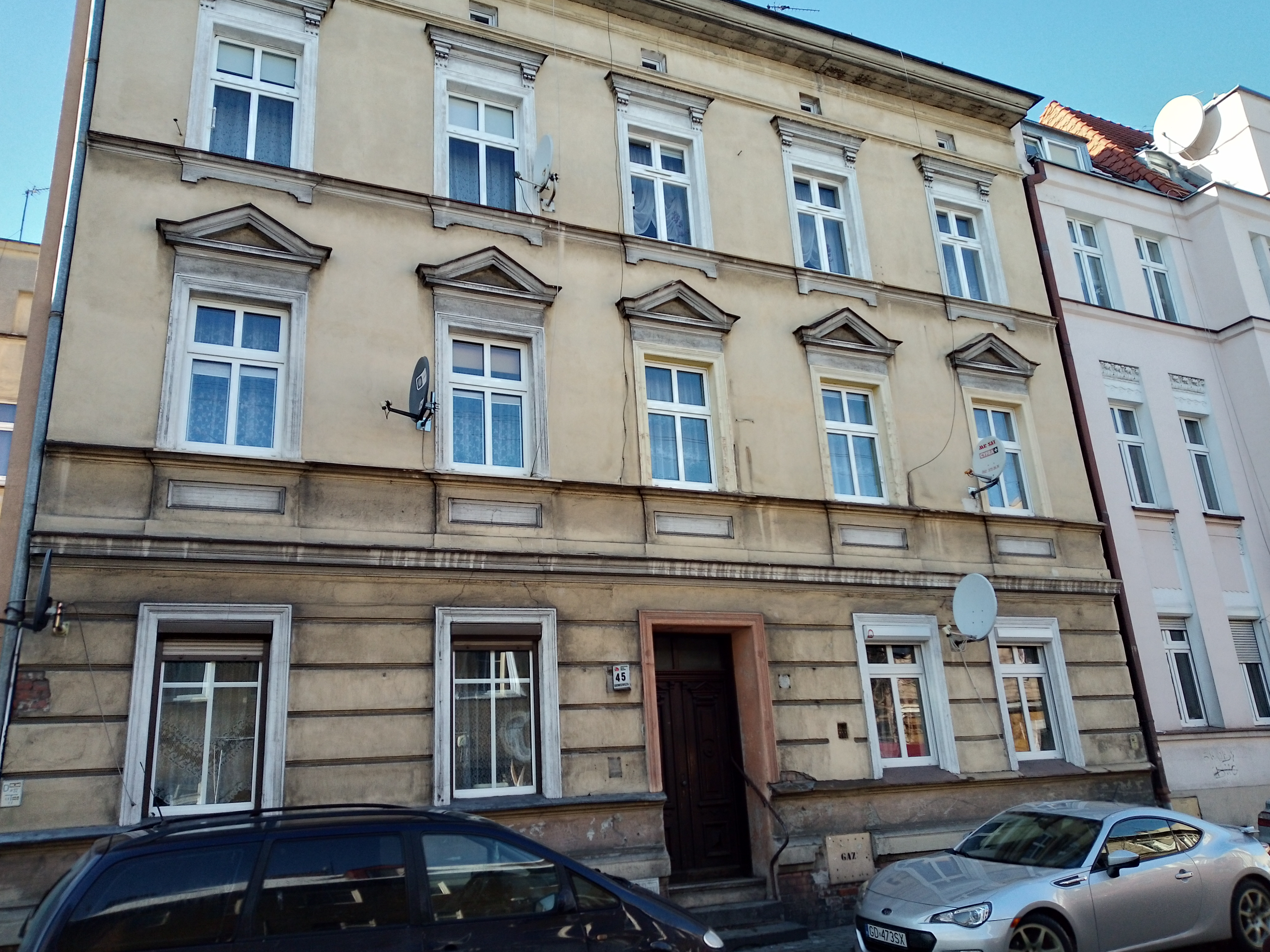
View from the street

=== Tenement at 47 ===
1900

Art Nouveau, early modern architecture

Its first landlord is listed as Julius Scröder, a trader in flour.

Lean lines define the facade, balanced by the presence of two avant-corps. The entrance portal is flanked by two columns and a pediment. Art Nouveau elements are still visible in the decoration, with a waving line running along the elevation and with the floral stuccoed adornment of the lintels.

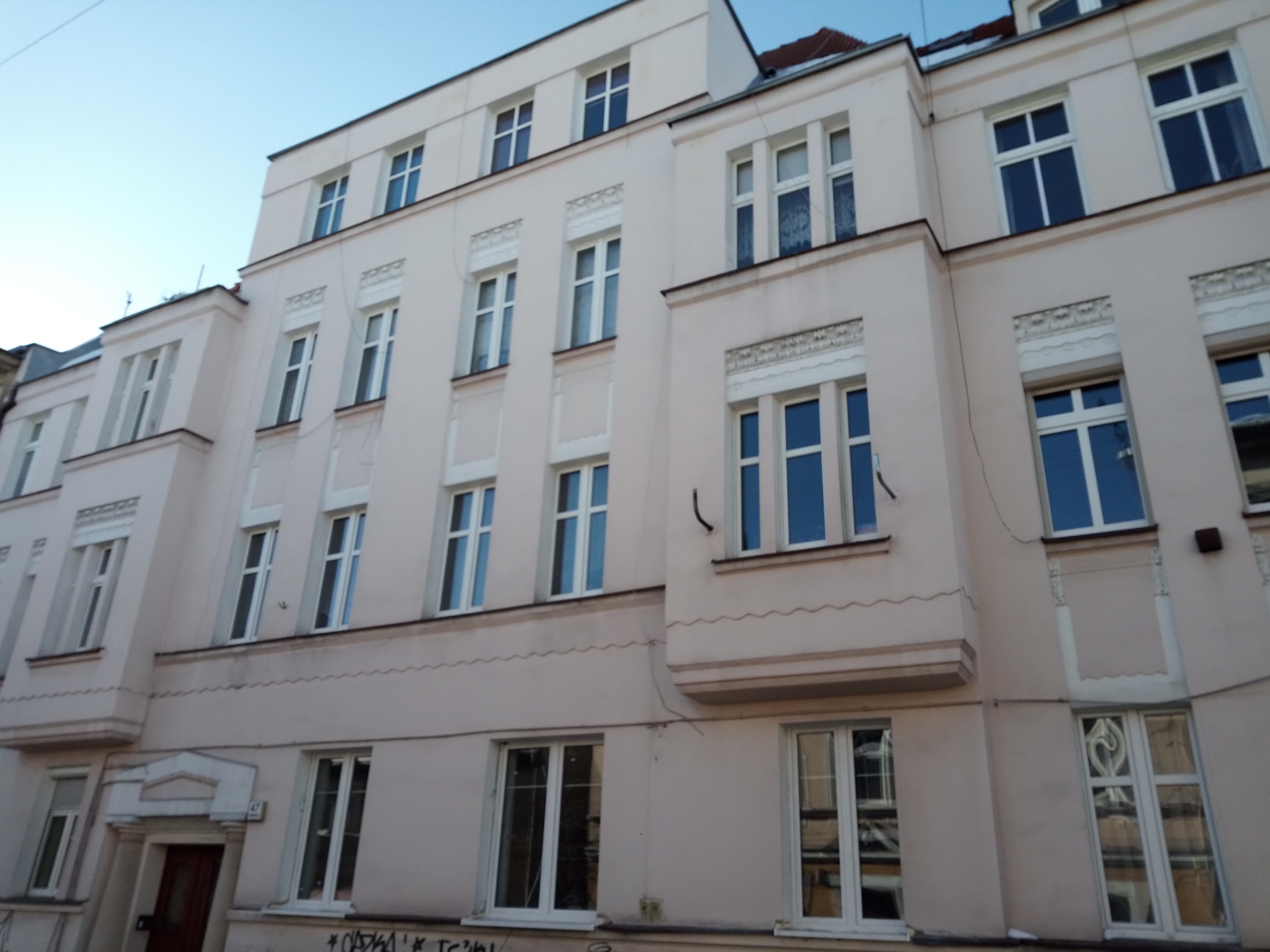
View of the main elevation

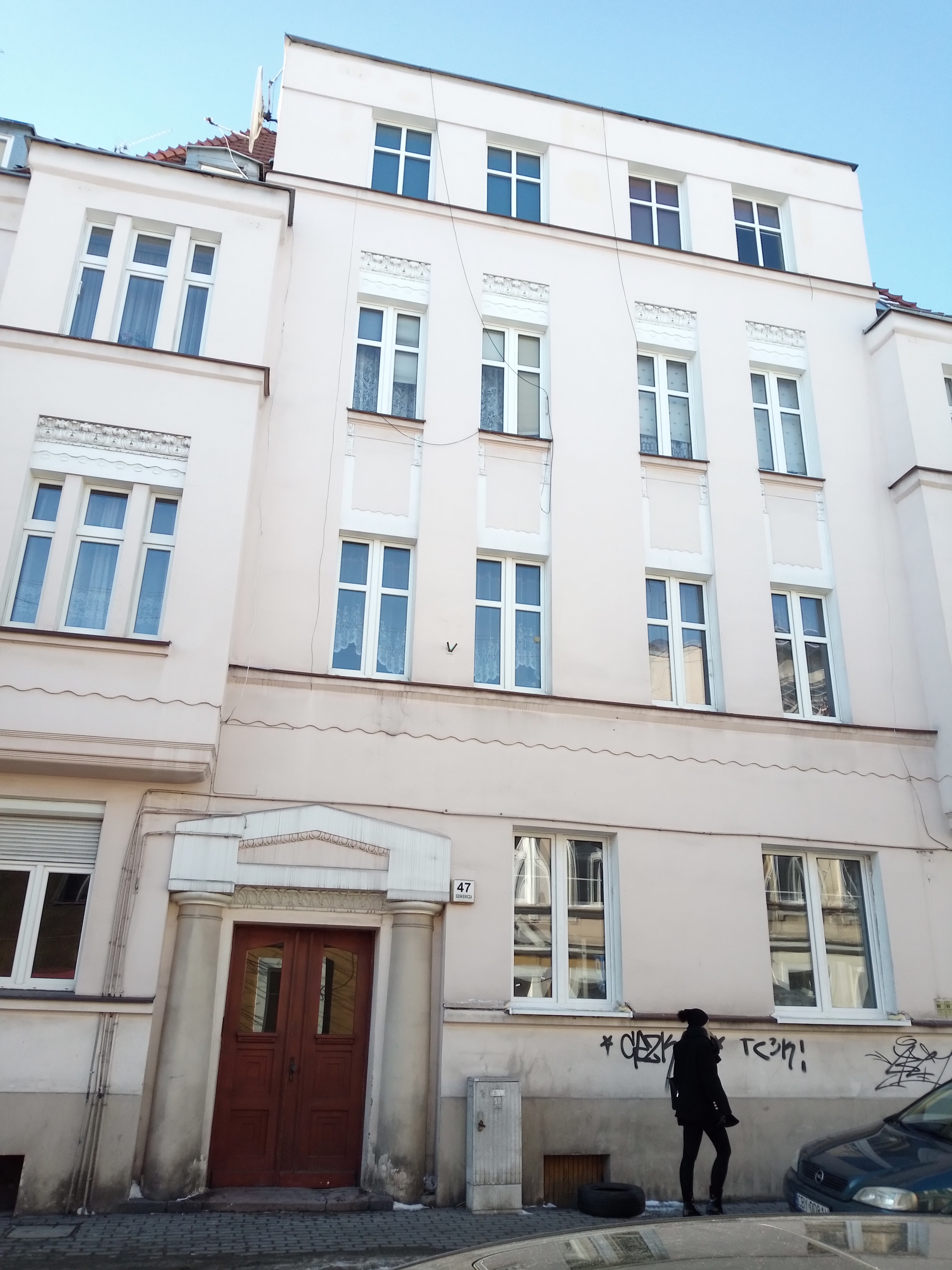
Avant-corps and portal

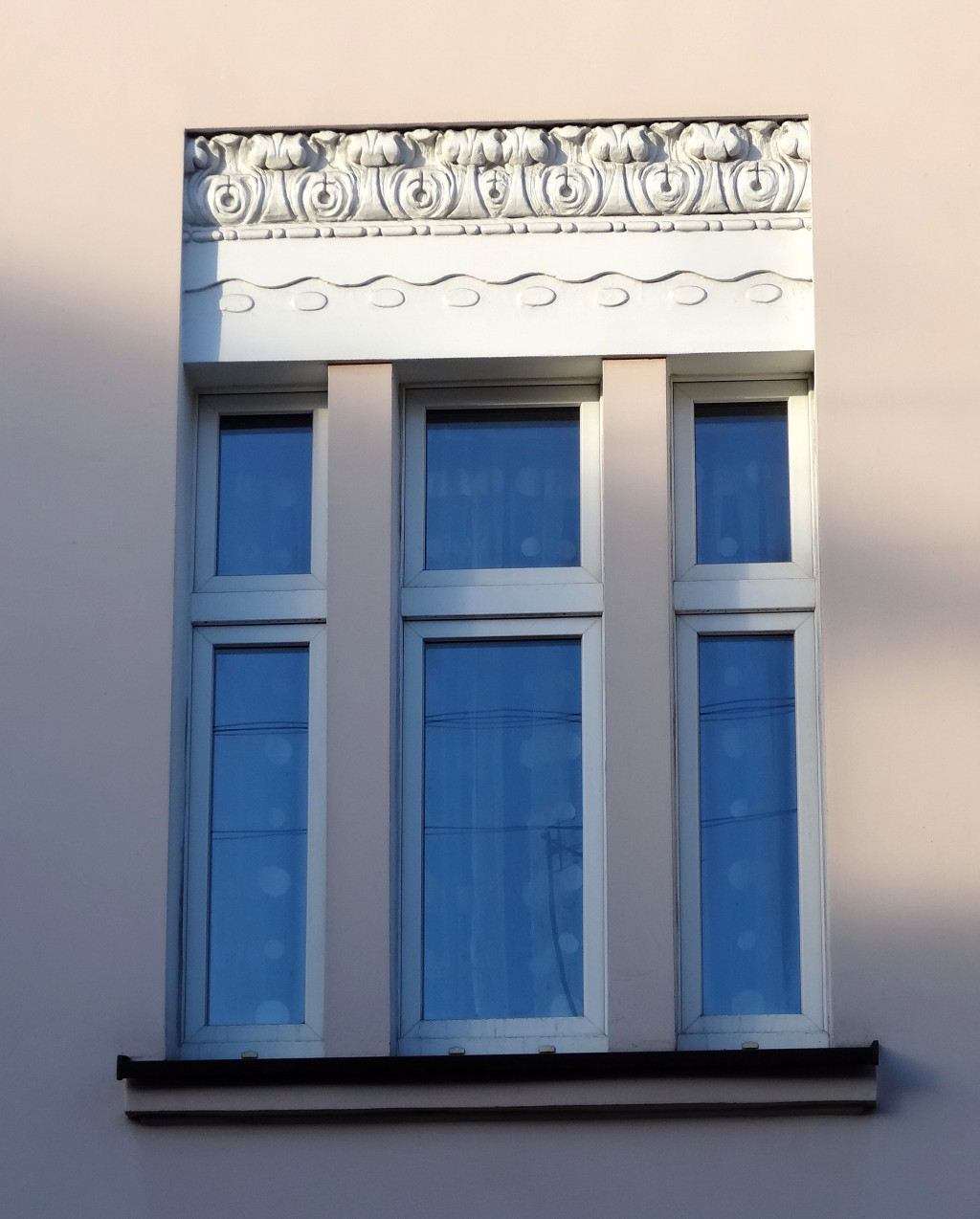
Detail of the lintel ornamentation

=== Franz Bogusławski house at 48 ===
1900

Eclecticism

Bogusławski was a mason by trade. He lived there till 1939.

The single story house reveals its old character. The building must have been re-constructed from a more ancient one, hence keeping its initial features.

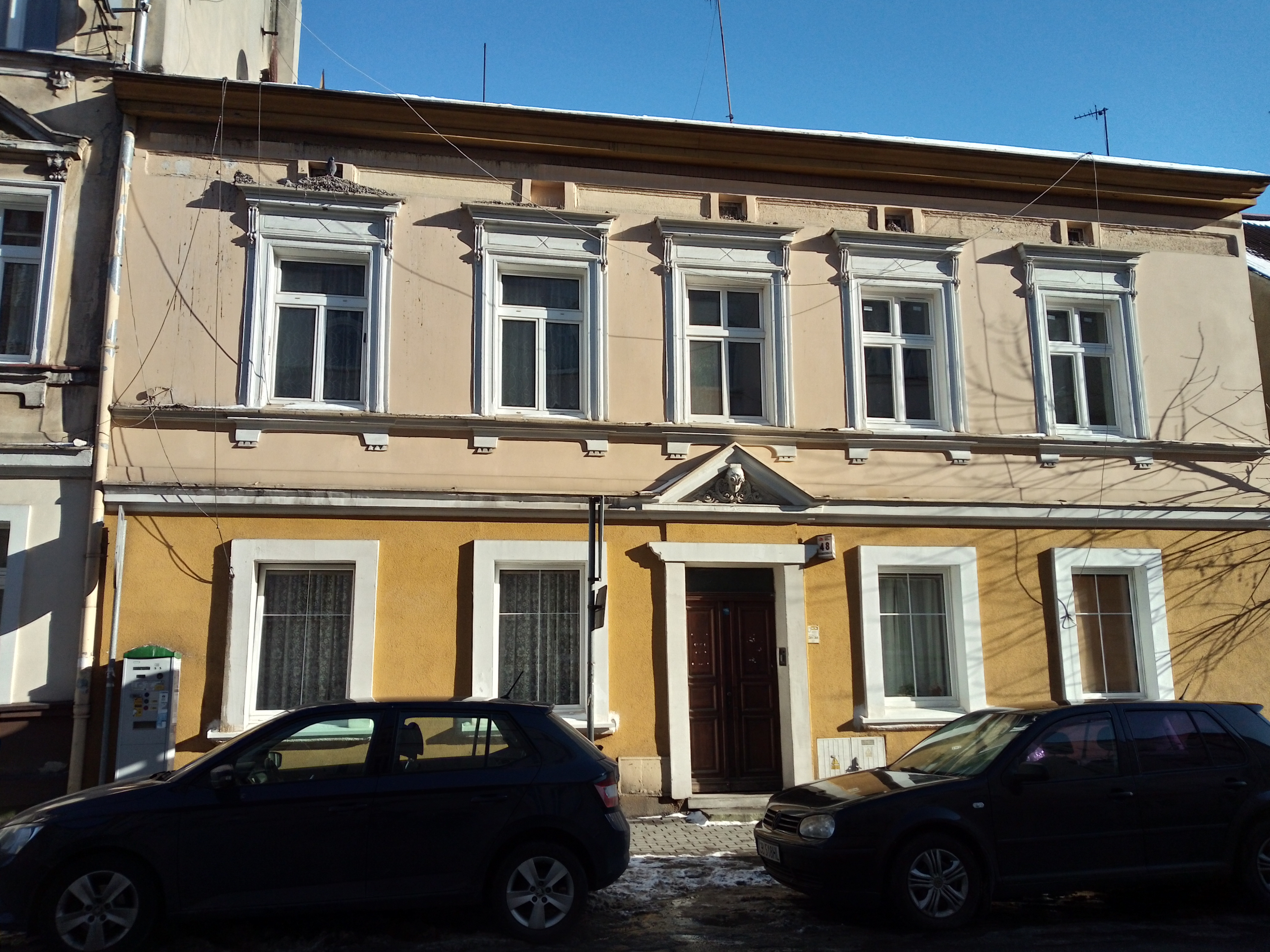
Main elevation

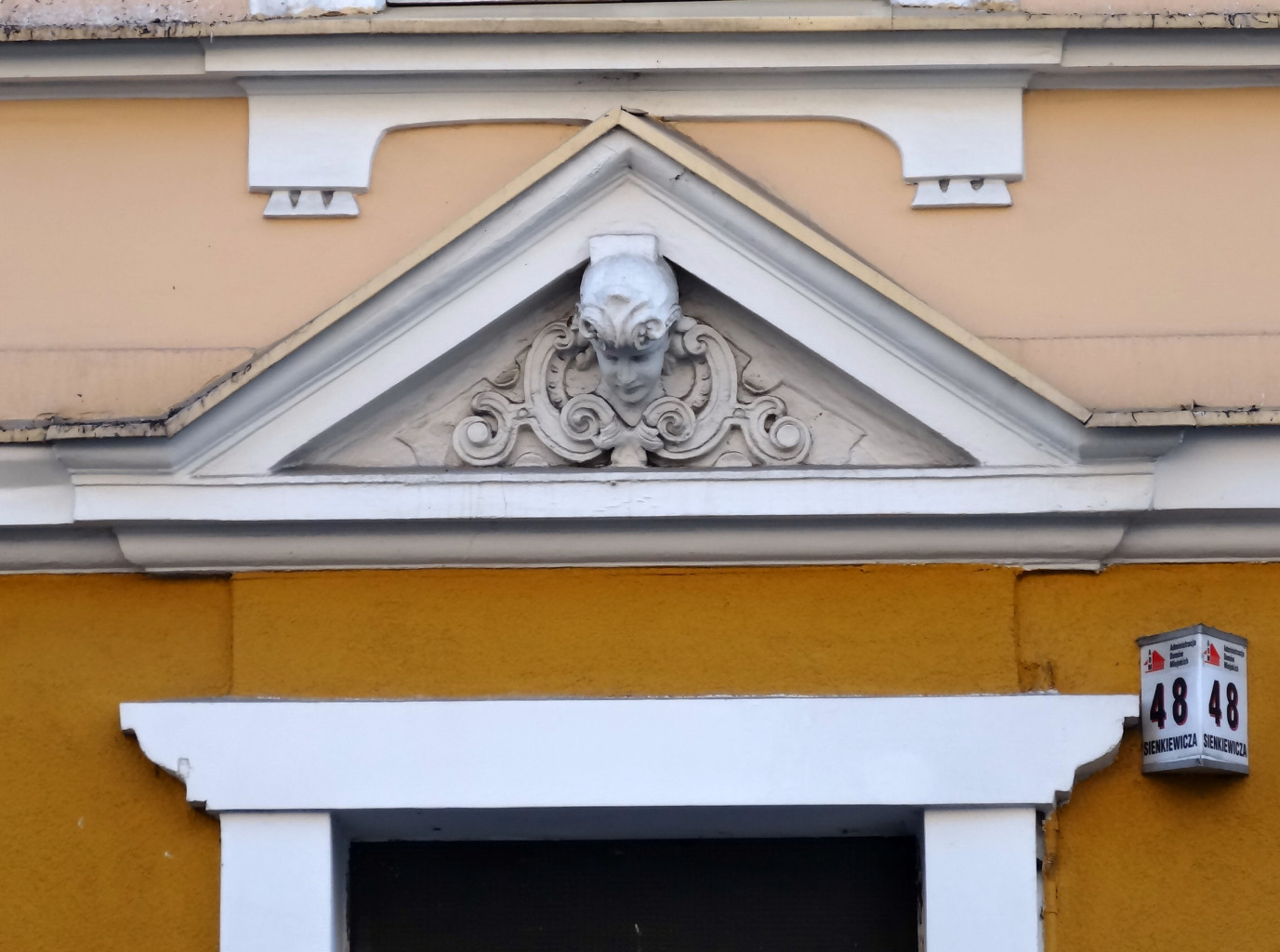
Adorned pediment

=== Tenement at 49 ===
1900

Eclecticism

A railway locksmith named Lukowicz, living in Charlottenburg, was listed as the owner of this building from its completion till WWII.

The tenement underwent a refurbishment in the first half of 2020. The sturdy shape of the facade is now reinforced by the brick-apparent display, the heavy pilasters and the coarse broken pediments. Interestingly, the corbels crowning the frontage present artistic mascarons.

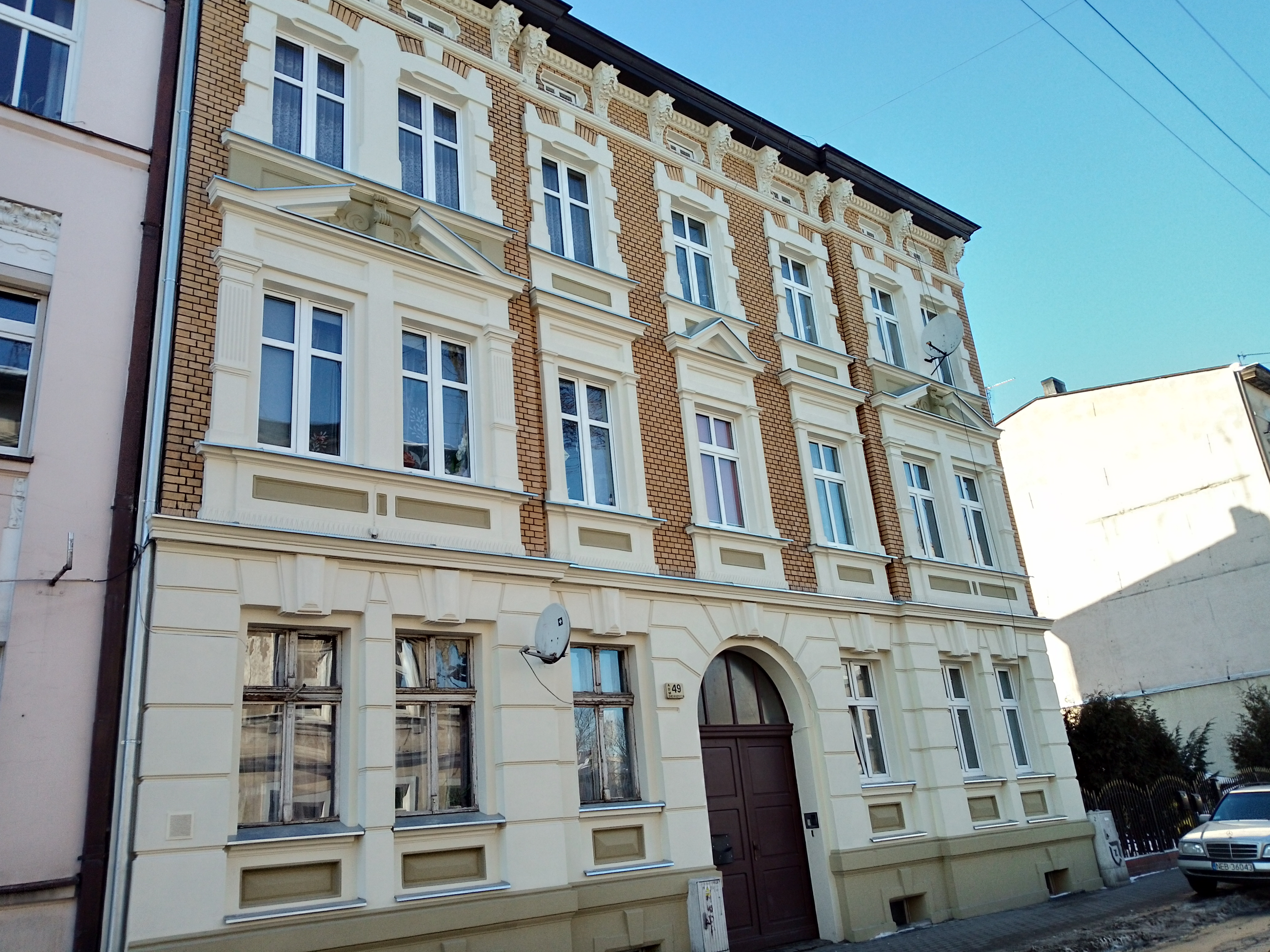
Renovated facade

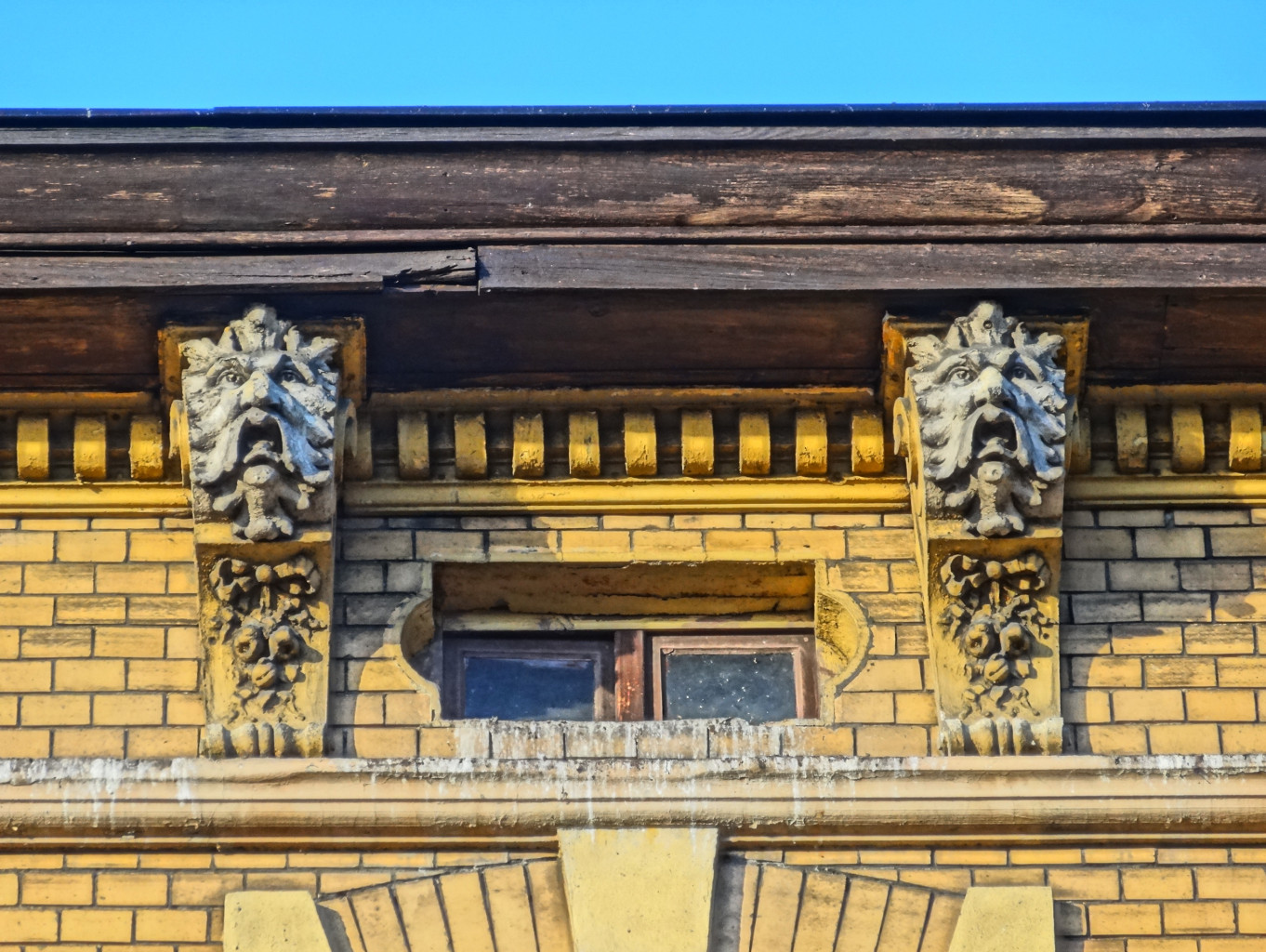
Mascaron corbels

=== Franz Bogusławski tenement at 50 ===
1900

Eclecticism

Bogusławski, living at abutting Nr.48, owned this building as well. He had his initial, "B", inscribed in the half-moon pediment in the middle on the facade.

Apart from this marking, very few original details withstood the passage of time. A singular cartouche filled with curved motifs stands above the main entrance.

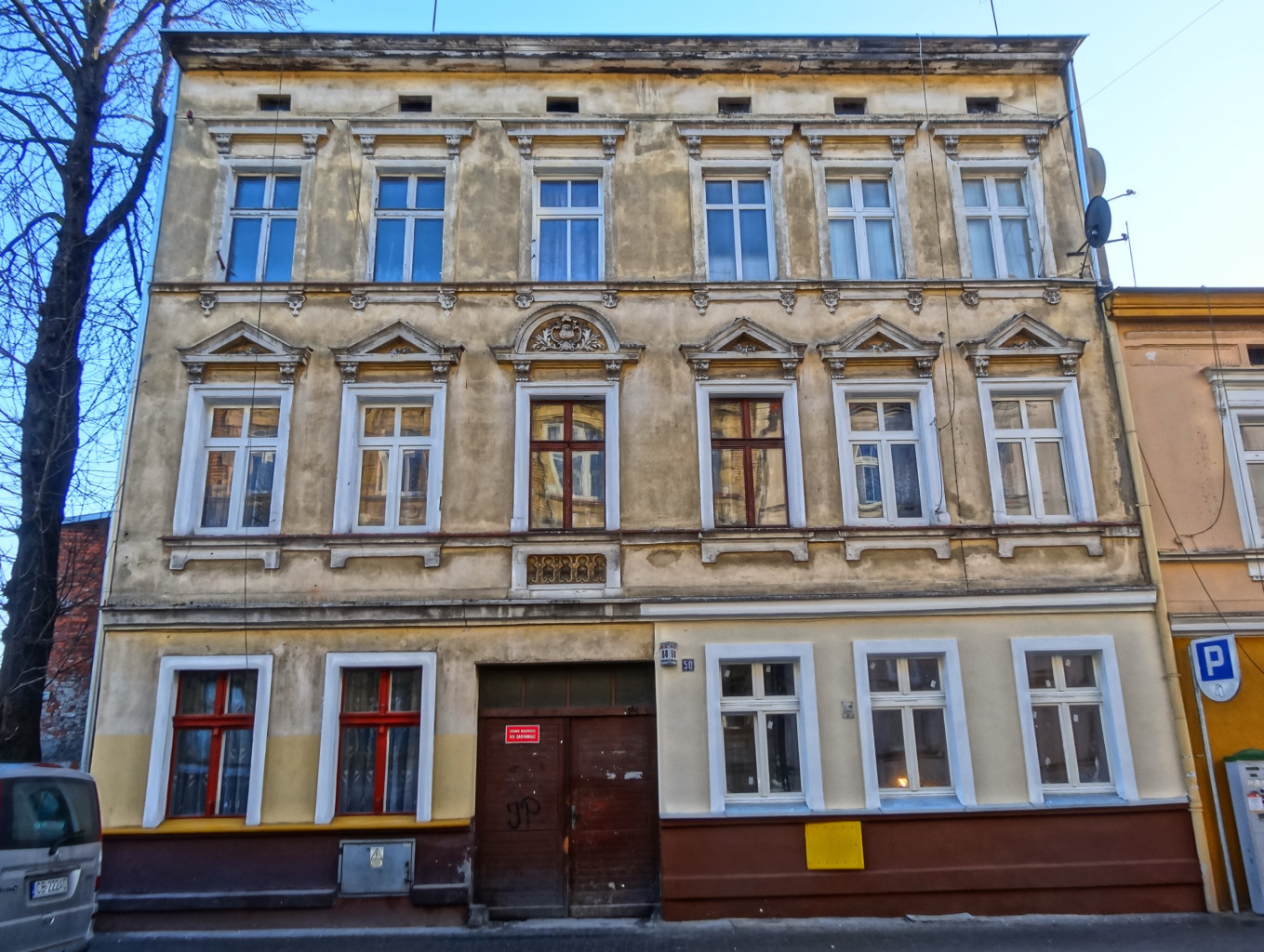
Main elevation

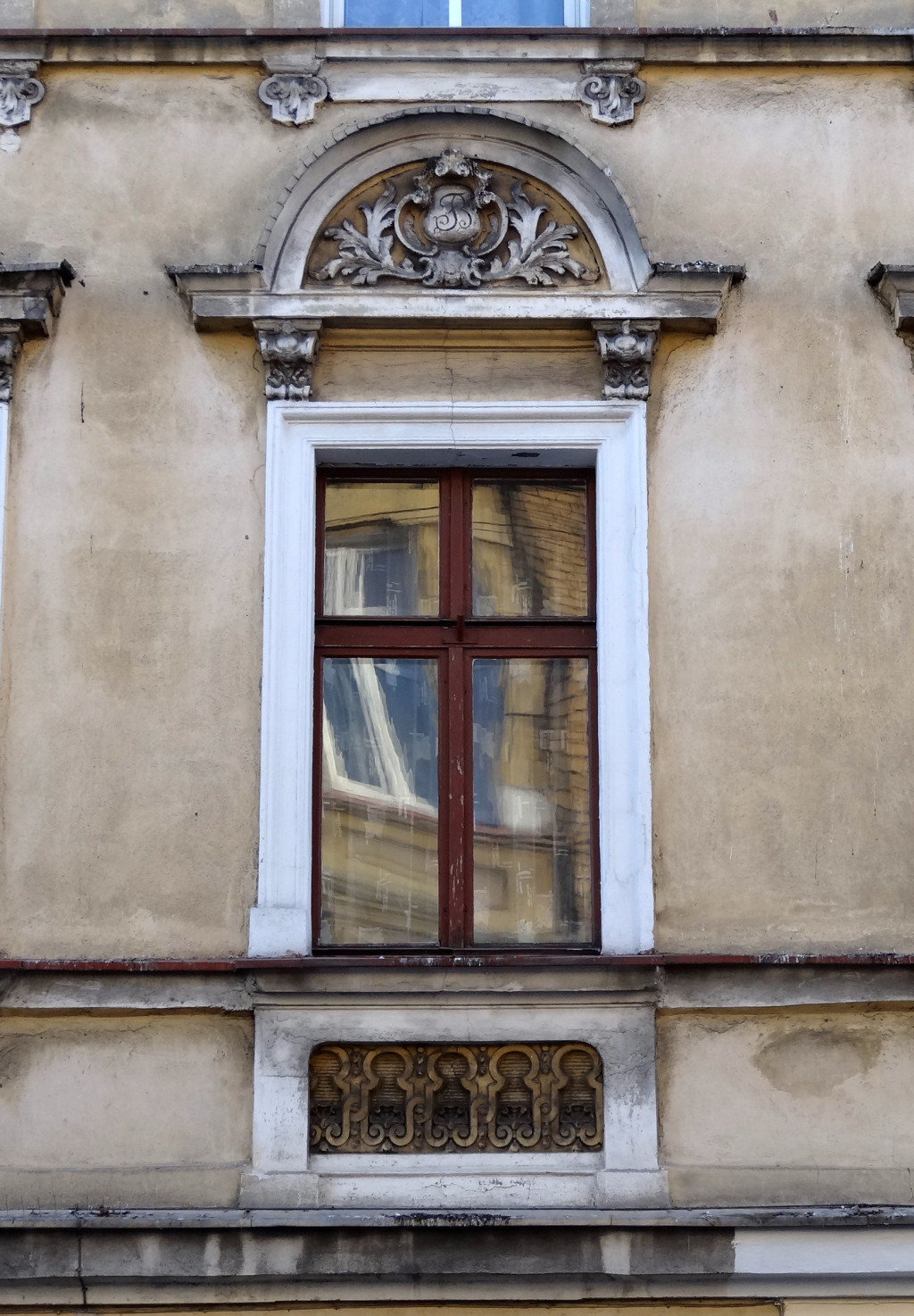
Detail of the "B" label and the cartouche.

=== Gączerzwicz tenements at 53/55/57 ===
Late 1890s, by Anton Hoffmann

Eclecticism

These three buildings were commissioned and held by the same investor, Kazimir Gączerzwicz, a shoe maker. He inhabited the house at "31 Mittelstraße" (today's 57), but his business was located at "18 Neue Pfarr Straße" (Jezuicka street). The project was designed by Anton Hoffmann.

All three facades exhibit the same eclectic features: Nr.53 is better preserved, Nr.55 presents an original and narrow carriage passage, and one-story Nr.57 is much smaller than the others, but retains some decorative acanthus leaves placed on the brackets adorning the windows.

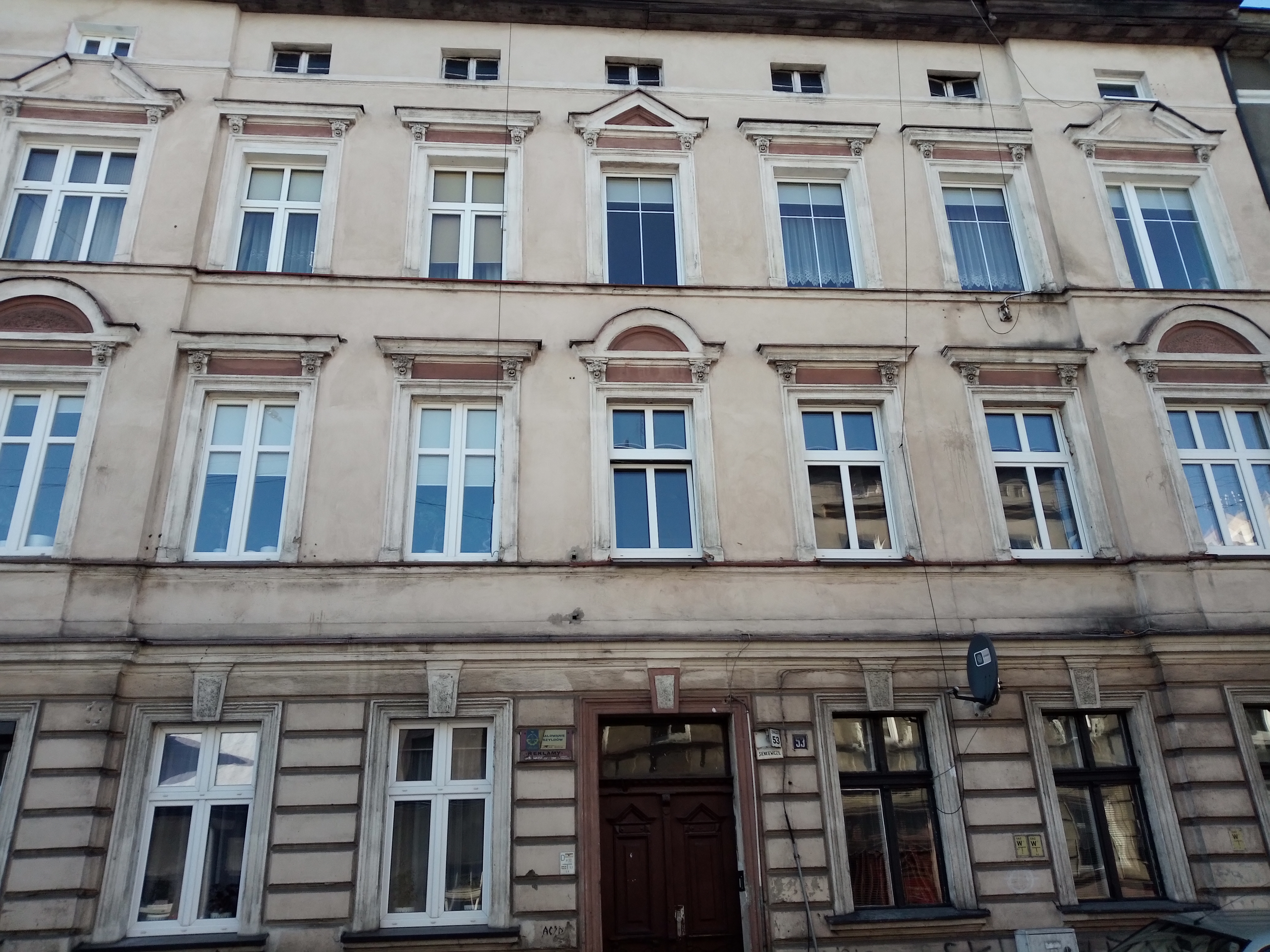
Frontage at Nr.53

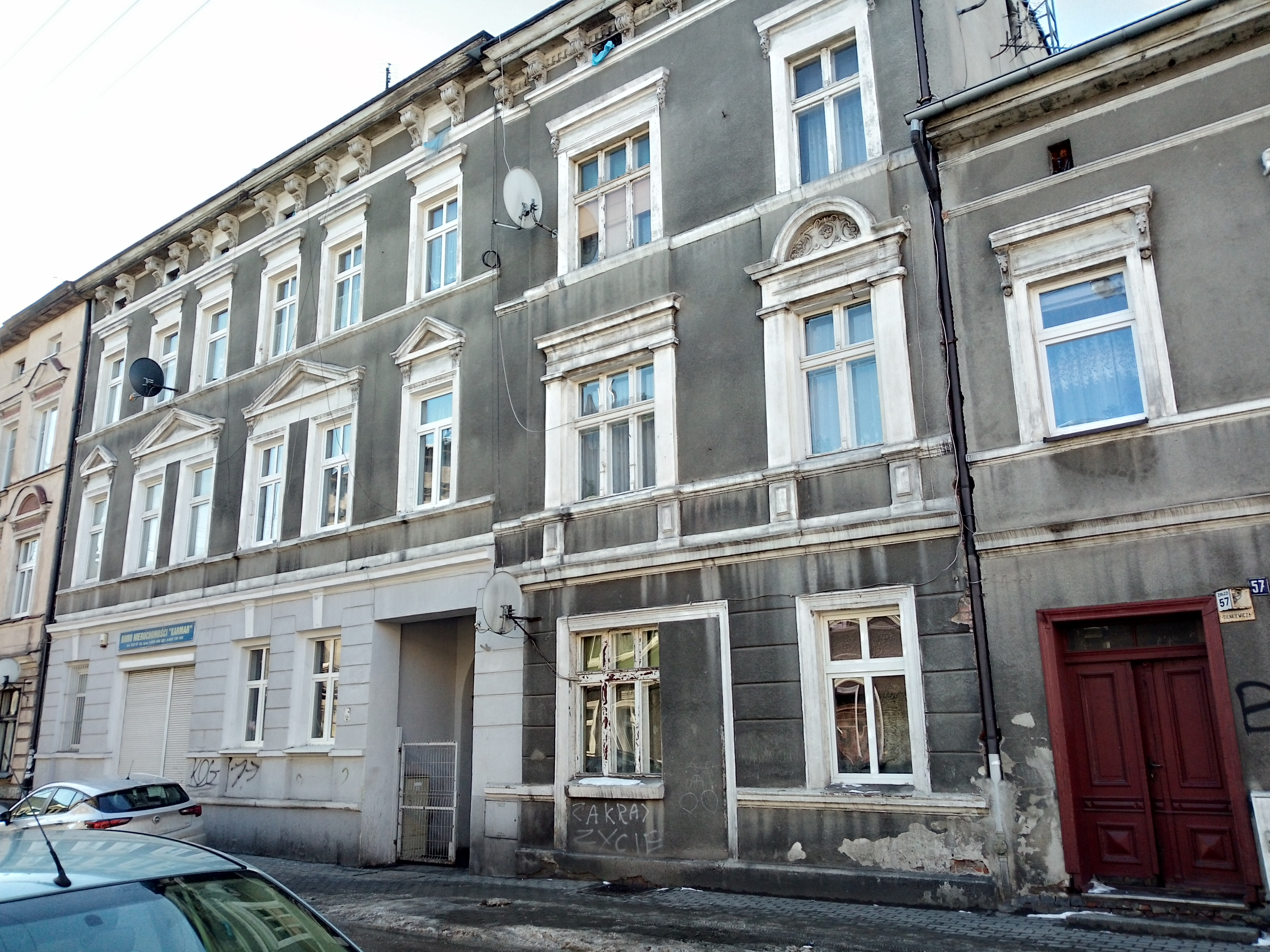
Facades at Nr.55 and 57

=== Wybrański tenements at 56/58 ===
Late 1890s

Eclecticism

Both buildings were commissioned by Matthaüs Wybrański, working as a roofer. He lived at "35 Mittelstraße" (Nr.58) and maintained ownership of the houses until the late 1930s.

Both facades exhibit eclectic features.

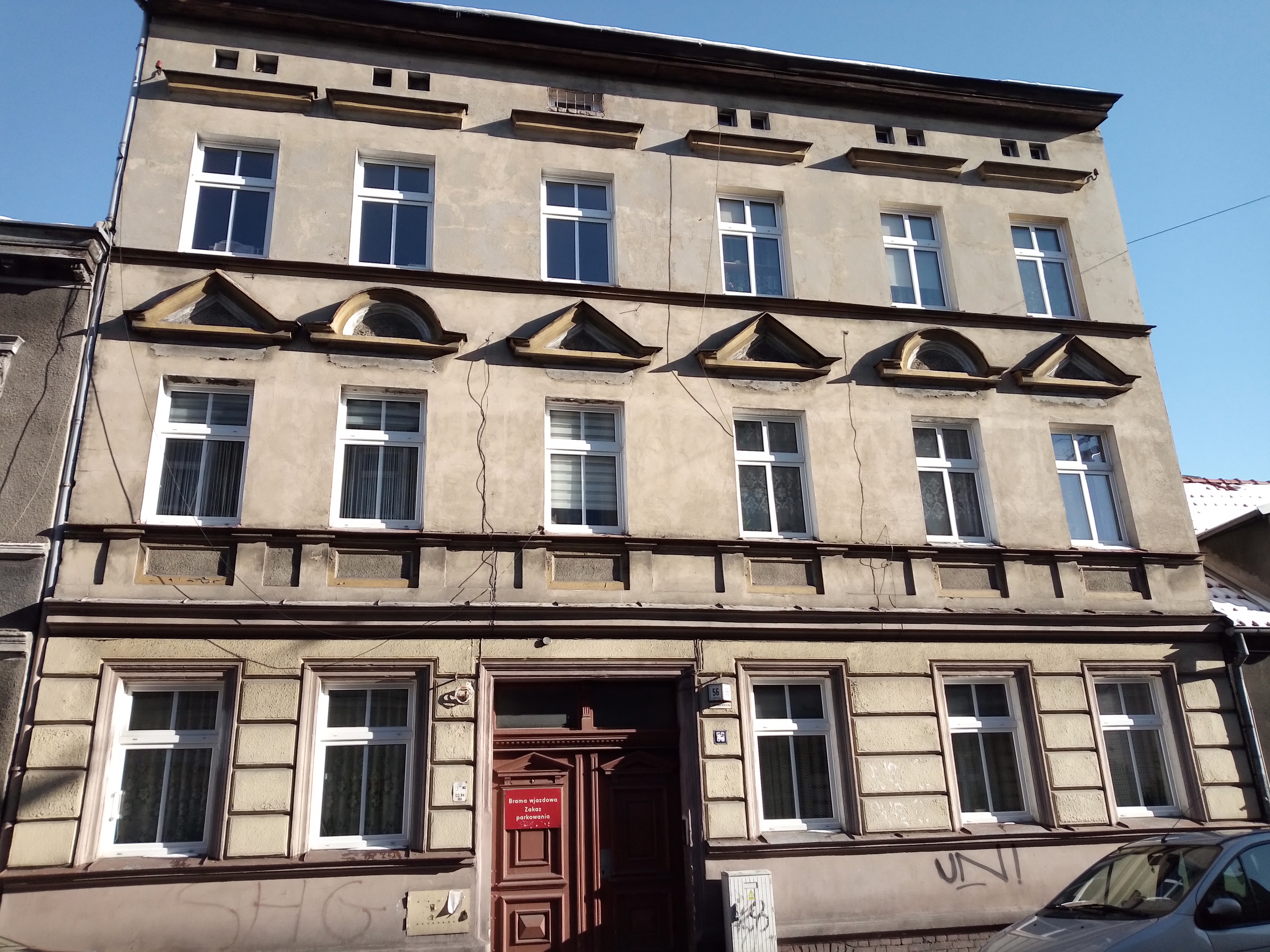
Frontage at Nr.56

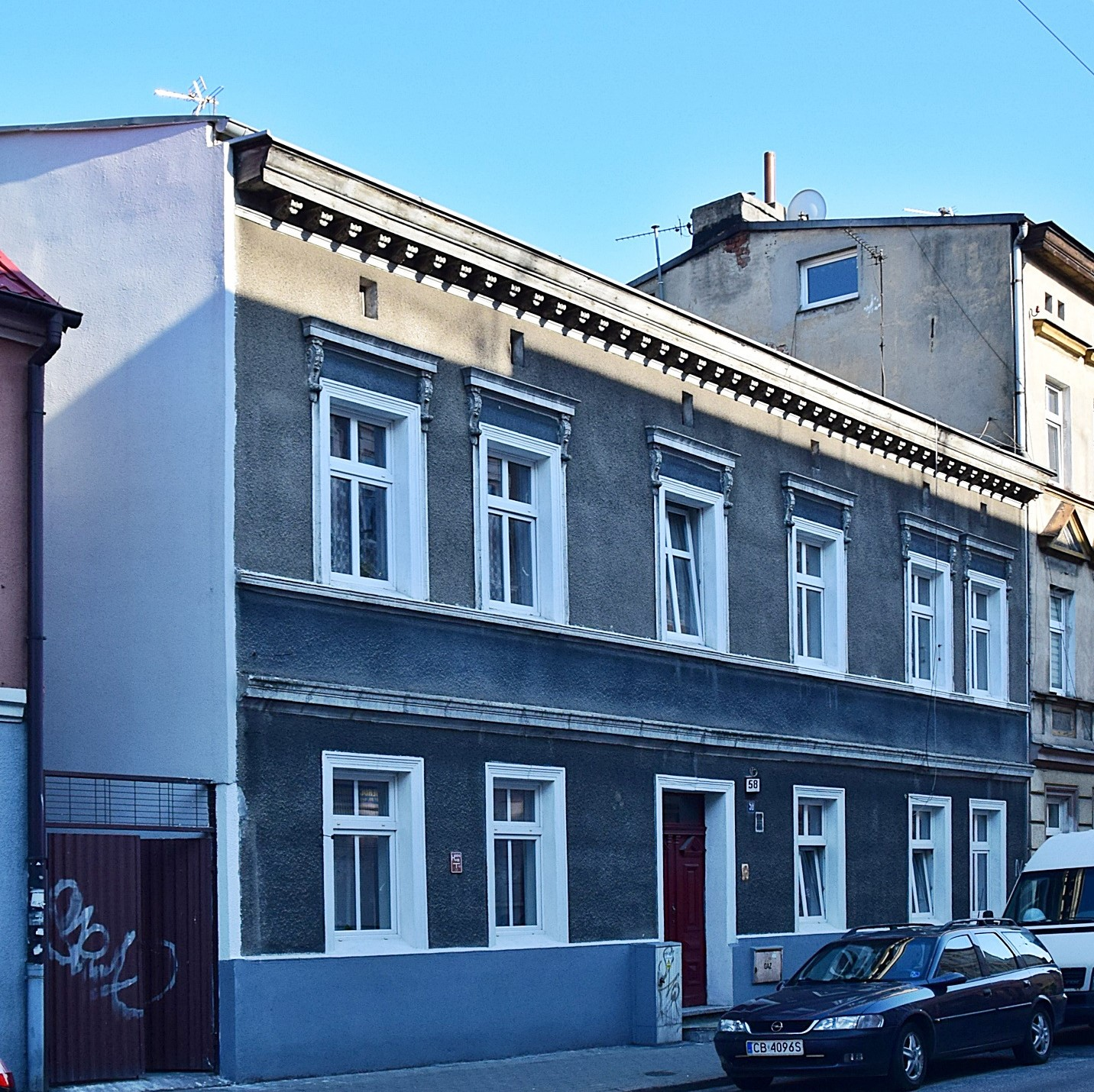
Facade at Nr.58

=== Hobbergs tenements at 59/61 ===
Late 1890s

Eclecticism

These buildings were the result of the investment of Robert and Wilhelm Hobberg: Robert for Nr.59, Wilhelm for Nr.61. Robert was a food retailer, and Wilhelm was a master carpenter.

Nr.59 still boasts noticeable architectural details (bossage, pediments, corbels) on its narrow frontage. The facades at Nr.61, on the corner with Bocianowo street, have unfortunately lost all their decoration.

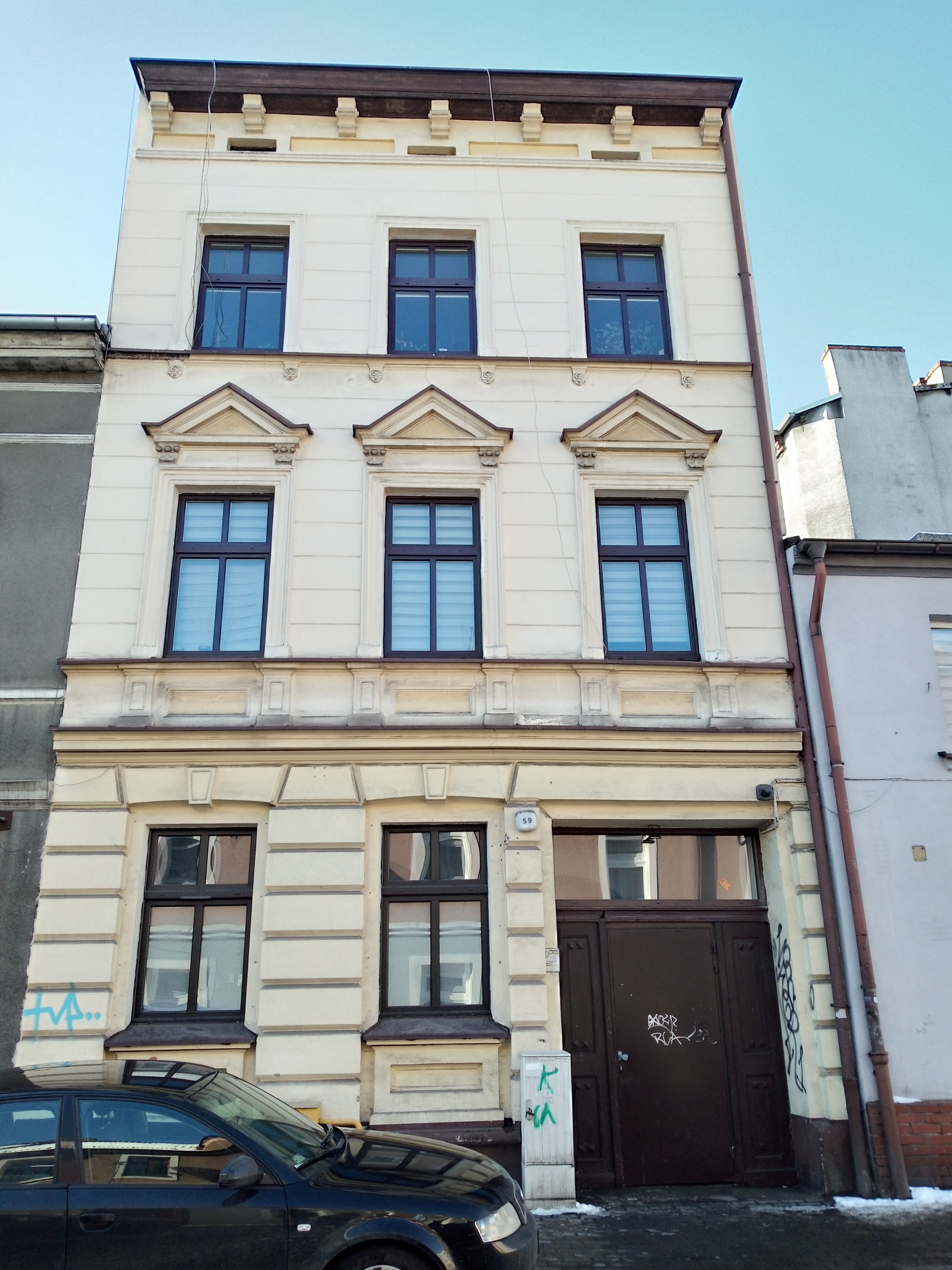
Elevation at Nr.59

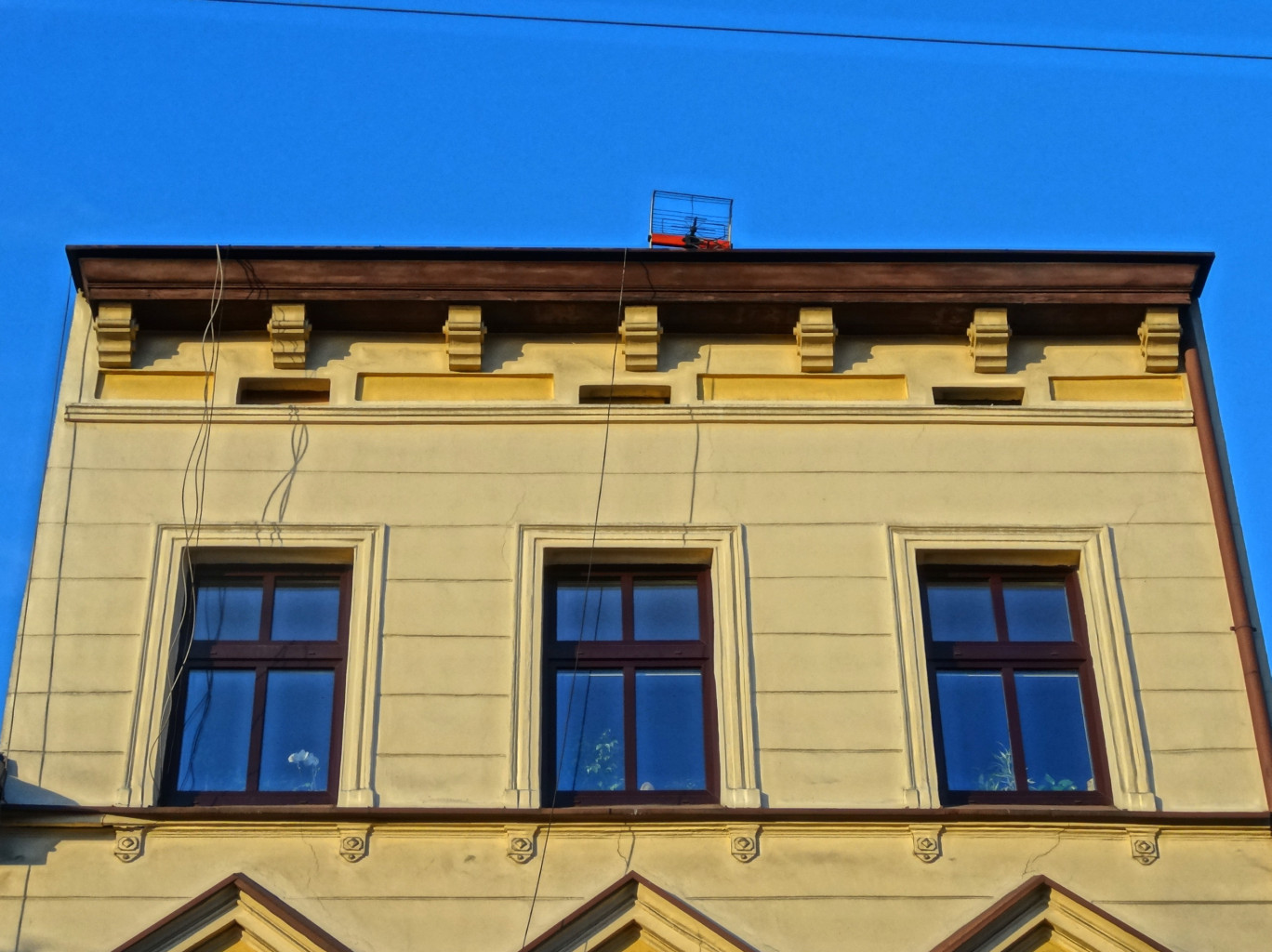
Detail of ornamentation at 59

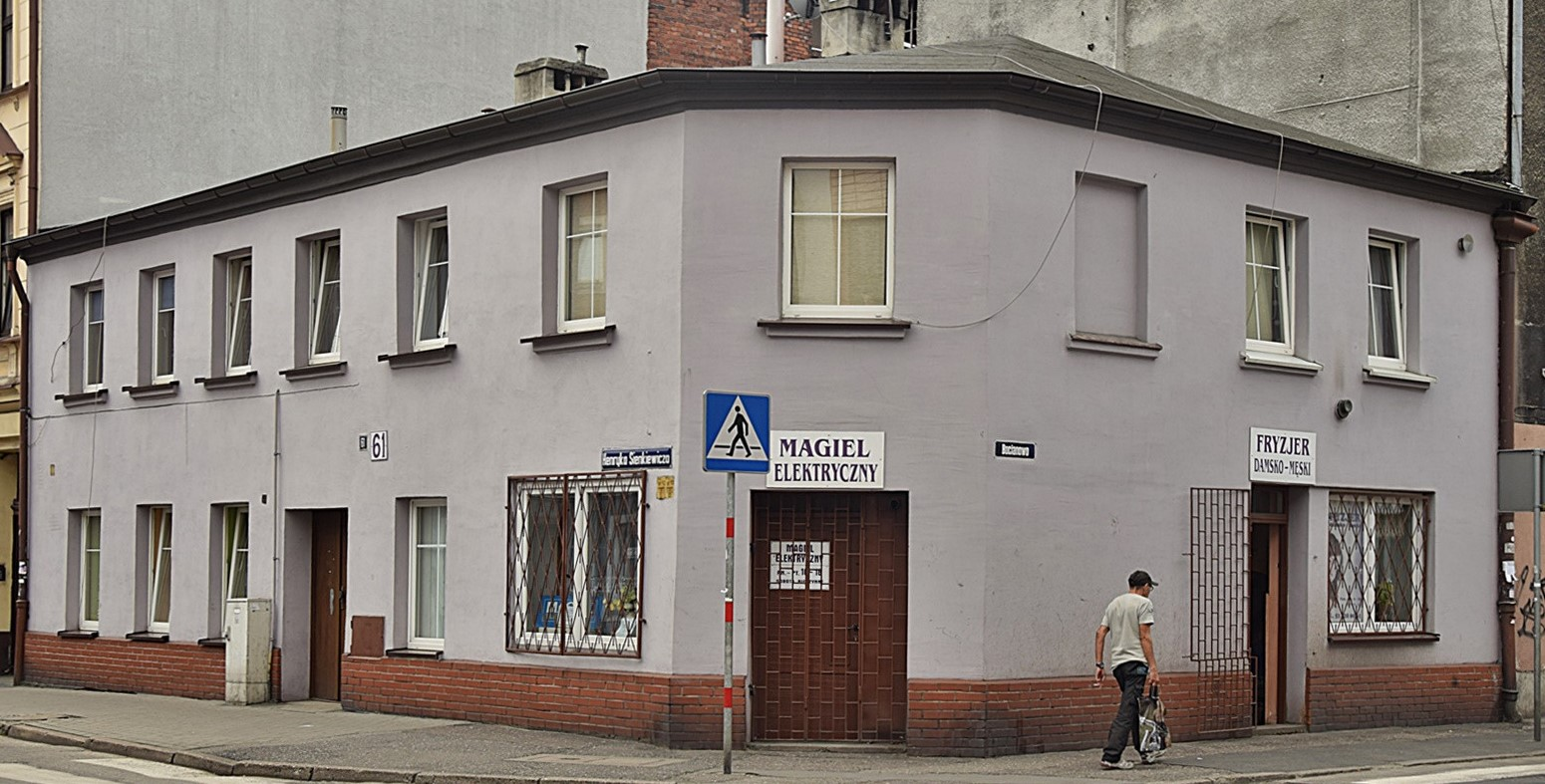
Corner house at Nr.61

=== Tenement at 60 ===
Late 1890s

Eclecticism

This long corner house was first owned by Johann ßalmowski, a baker. Today, a bakery still operates here: it specialises in potato bread made with rye flour.

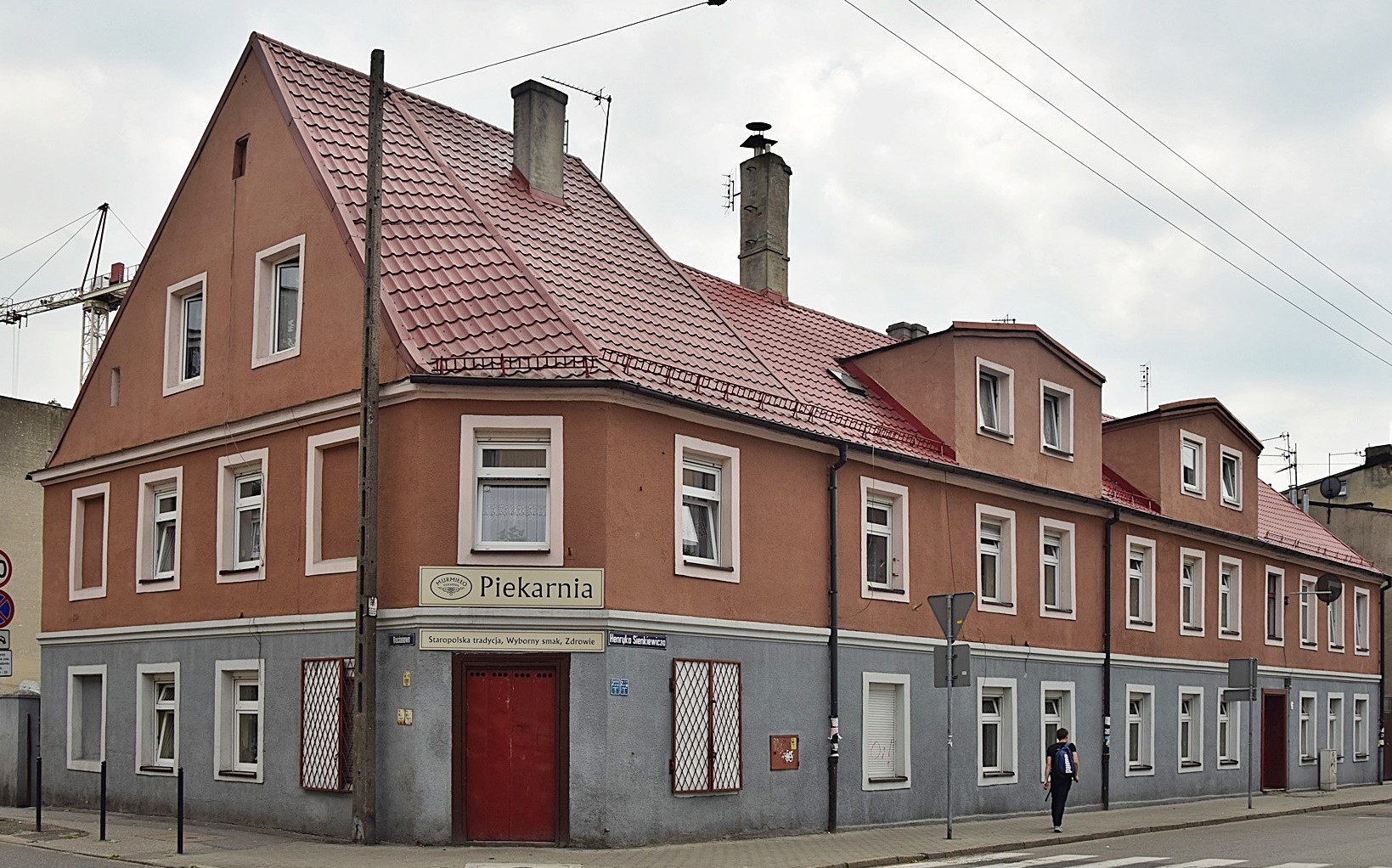
View of the corner house at Nr.60

== See also ==
- Bydgoszcz
- Polish eastern borderlands
- Anton Hoffmann

== Bibliography ==
- (in Polish) Umiński, Janusz (1996). Bydgoszcz. Przewodnik. Bydgoszcz: Regionalny Oddział PTTK "Szlak Brdy".
- (in Polish) Parucka, Krystyna (2008). Zabytki Bydgoszczy: minikatalog. Bydgoszcz: TIFEN" Krystyna Parucka. ISBN 9788392719106.
