= Kołłątaja Street, Bydgoszcz =

Street in Bydgoszcz, Poland

Coordinates: 53.1278°N 18.0111°E

Hugona Kołłątaja street
Bydgoszcz
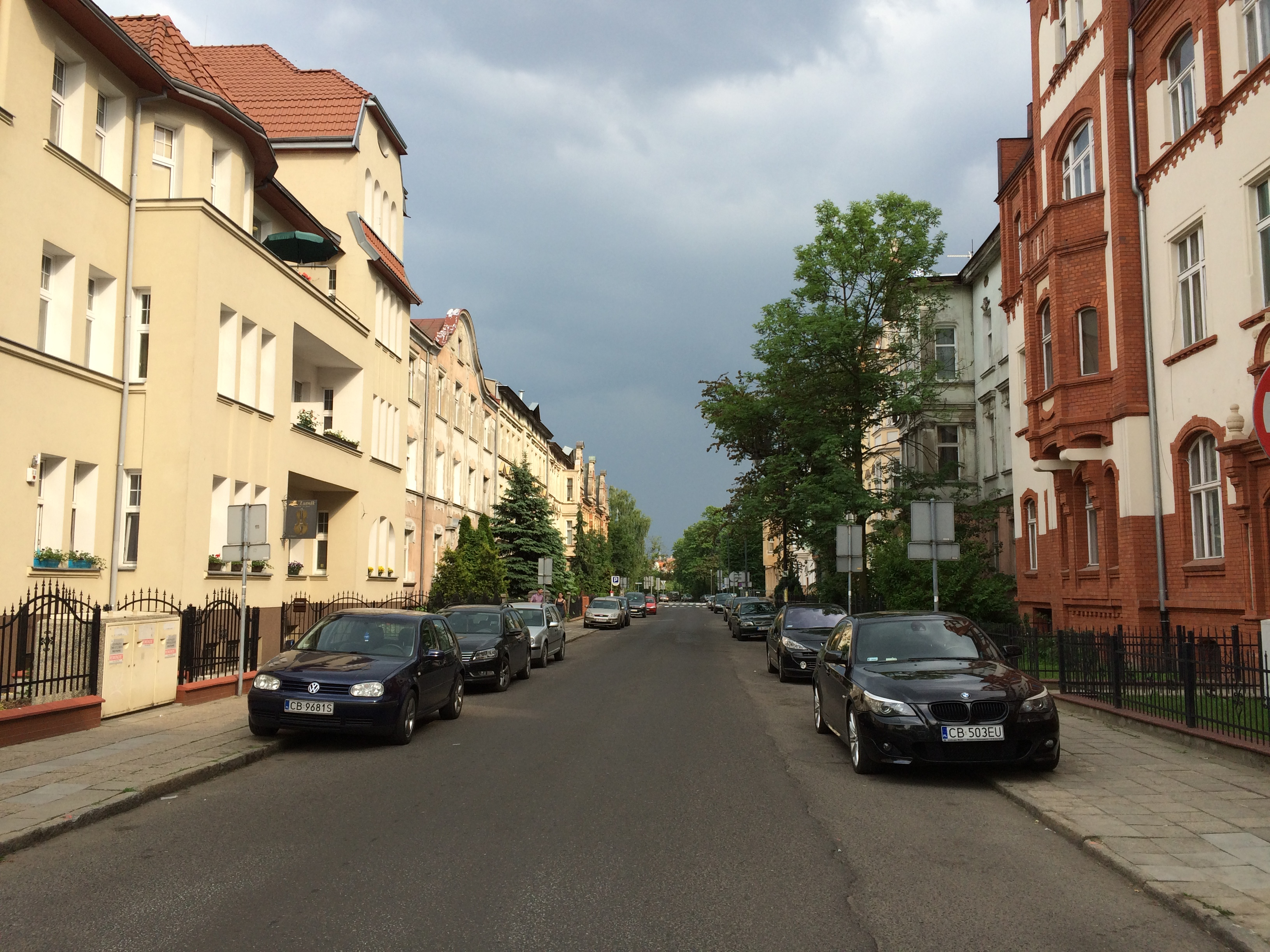
- Eastward view of Kołłątaja street

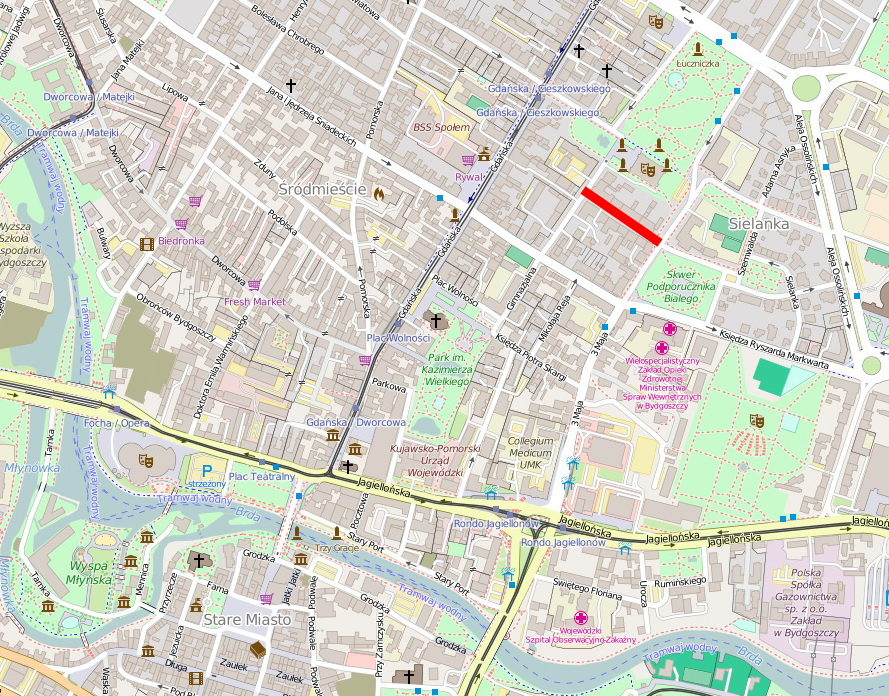
- Location of Kołłątaja street
- Native name: Ulica Księdza Hugona Kołłątaja (Polish)
- Former name: Roonstraße
- Namesake: Hugo Kołłątaj
- Owner: City of Bydgoszcz
- Length: 160 m (520 ft); Google maps
- Area: Downtown district
- Location: Bydgoszcz, Poland

Construction
- Construction start: End of 19th century
- Completed: 1900

Kołłątaja street is a historical street of downtown Bydgoszcz.

== Location ==
Kołłątaja street is a short avenue in Bydgoszcz, starting at the intersection with Libelta and Szwalbego streets and heading south-east to Stanisław Staszic street.

== History ==
The street was initially a path allowing access to the first house built in the street from 1899 to 1901, the Shelter for blind children at today's Nr.9.

A reference to the street was made on 1900 map of Bromberg. On the 1898 address book of Bromberg, the appellation "Roonstraße" appears for the first time, with only two referenced locations.

Through history, the street bore the following names:

- End 19th century-1920, Roonstraße;
- 1920–1939, Księdza Hugona Kołłątaja street;
- 1939–1945, Roonstraße;
- since 1945, Księdza Hugona Kołłątaja street.

The name comes from Hugo Kołłątaj (1750–1812), a Polish Roman Catholic priest, social and political activist, political thinker, historian and philosopher, seen as one of the most prominent figures of the Enlightenment in Poland.

== Main edifices ==
=== Tenement at 1, corner with 2 Szwalbego street ===
1911, by Fritz Weidner

Landhaus style, Eclecticism

Initial address was Roonstraße 8/9-Bachmannstraße 11, it then changed to Libelta street 12 before the creation of Szwalbego street. The tenement has been built for a German housing cooperative, German: Beamten wohnungsverein GmbH. In 1920, it moved to its Polish equivalent structure, Polish: Towarzystwo mieszkaniowe.

The style reminds German Mansion (German: Landhaus) outfits, with massive bay windows, variously shaped gables and asymmetry of the facade, for which Fritz Weidner was prone to. In 1909–1910, this house was identified as part of the winning selection in the Bromberg municipal competition for the most beautiful frontage.

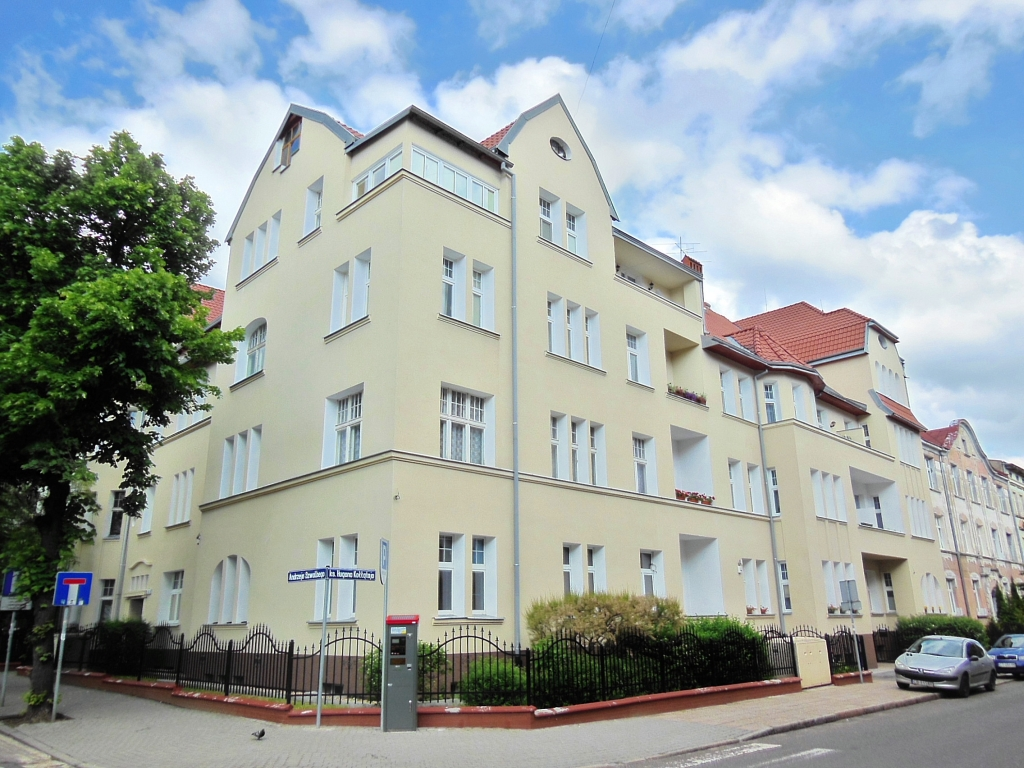
Corner view

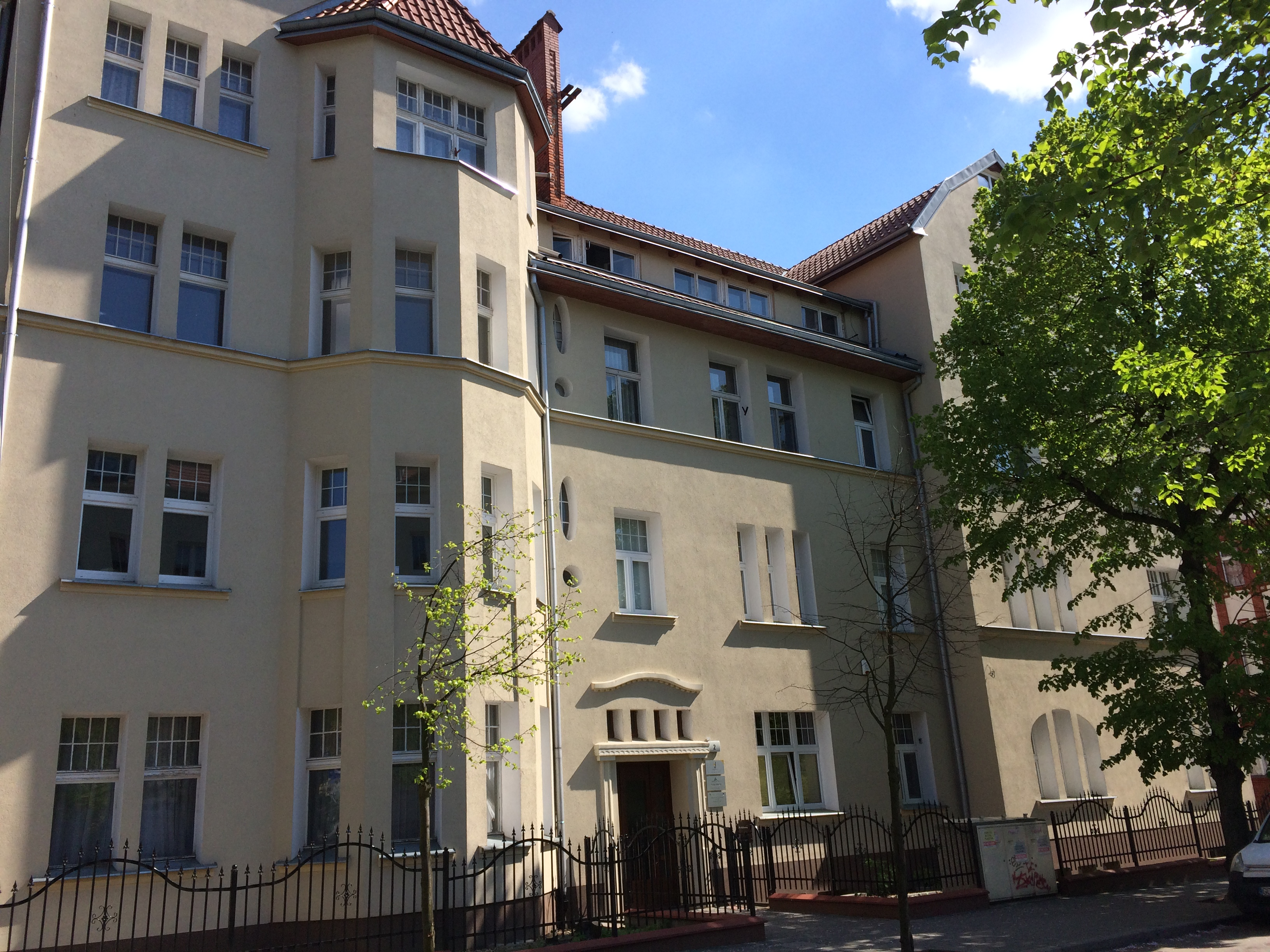
Facade on Szwalbego street

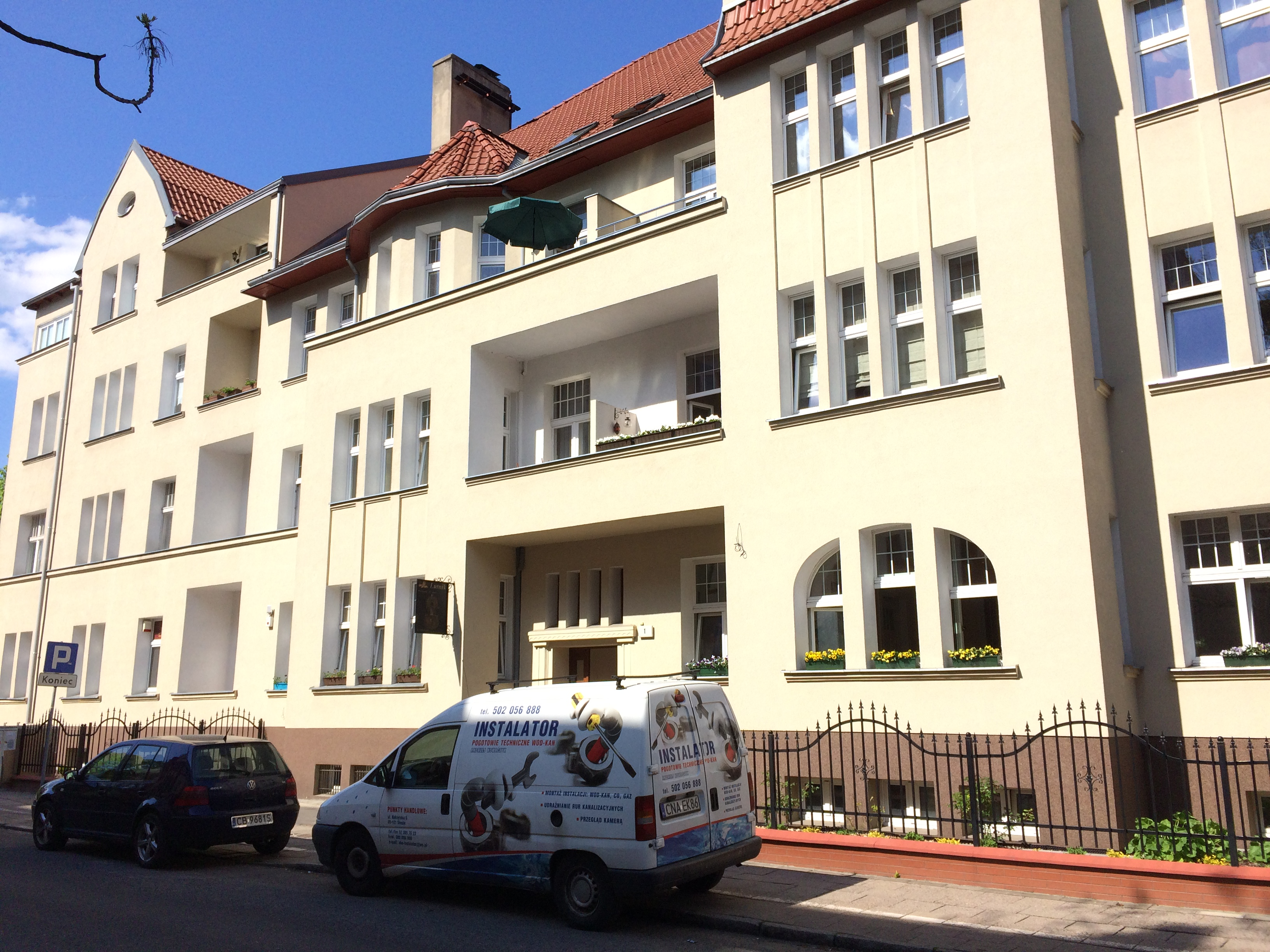
Facade on Hugo Kołłątaj street

=== Tenement at 2, corner with 10 Libelta street ===
Registered on Kuyavian-Pomeranian Voivodeship heritage list, Reg.A/1638, July 9, 2013

1901–1902, by George Weiß

Eclecticism, forms of Art Nouveau

Initially at the corner of Roonstraße and Bachmannstraße streets, the architect Georg Weiss made it his own house, before moving the second one he built in 1907 at 141 Gdańska Street. After the restoration of Poland in 1920 and the Peace of Riga with USSR, the edifice housed displaced Polish families from the Eastern Borderlands. At the end of World War II, the building was devastated by Soviet armed forces, which had a hospital here. After the war, the municipality took over the management of the tenement, being unable to find back its owner.

Perfectly refurbished in 2005, the house is among the highest decorated building in Bydgoszcz: Art Nouveau motifs enlightens the facades (women figures flanked by eagles, vases etc.). Today, it represents one of the pearls of Bydgoszcz architecture of the early 20th century.

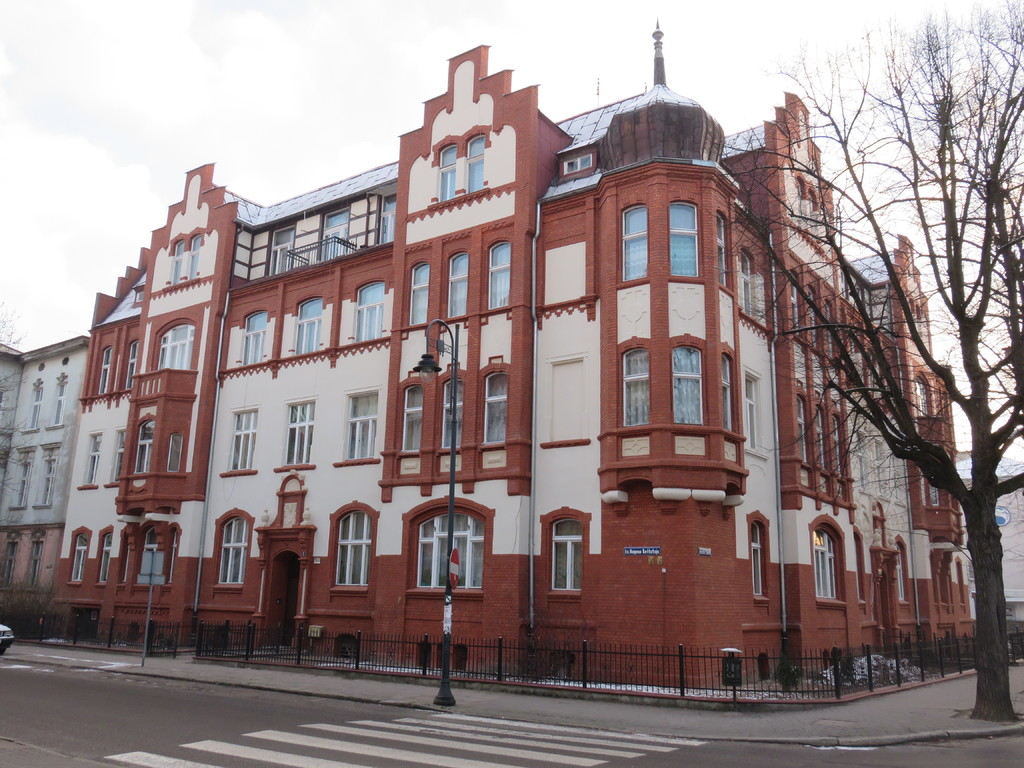
View of the corner

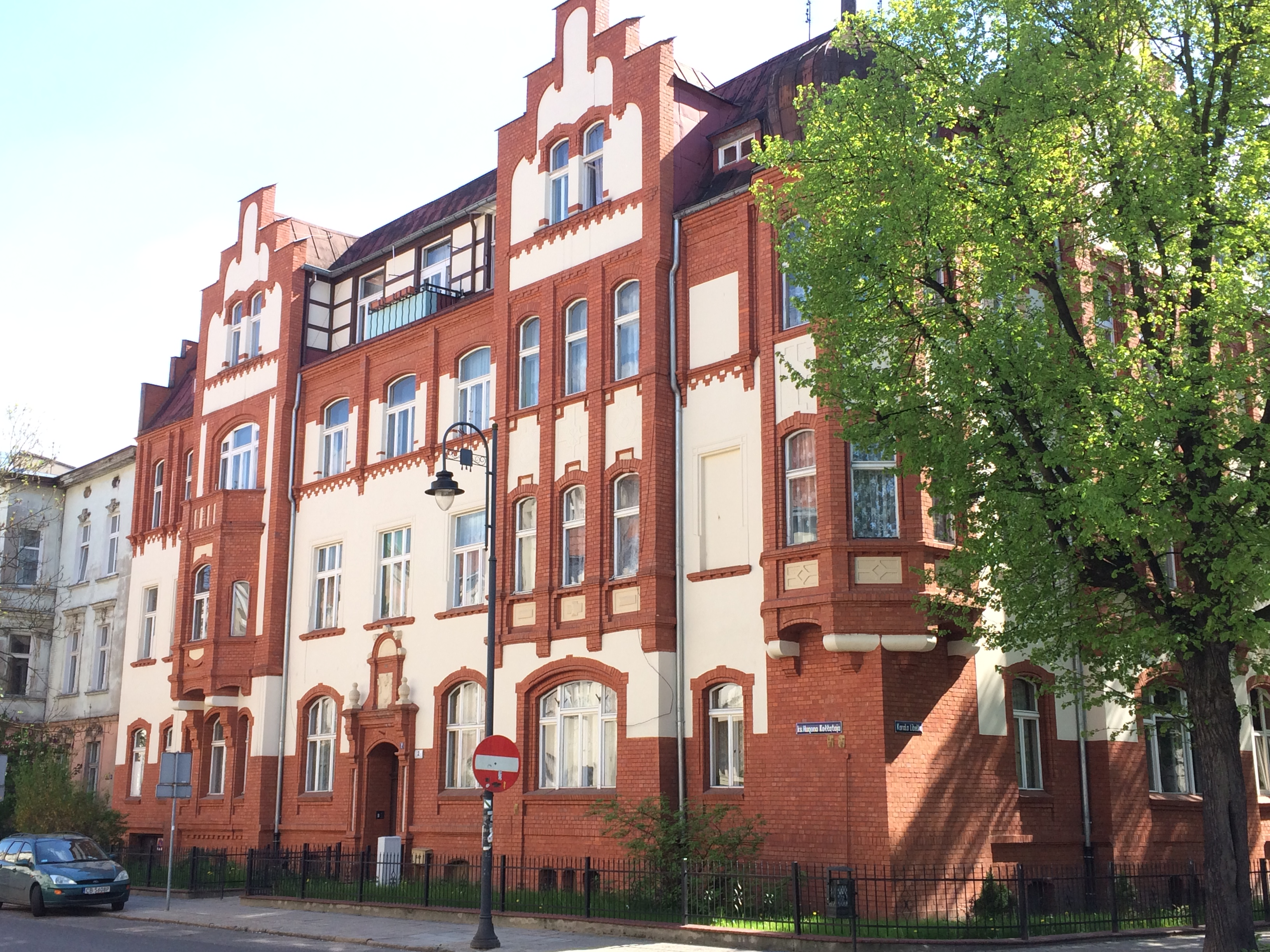
Facade on Hugo Kołłątaj Street

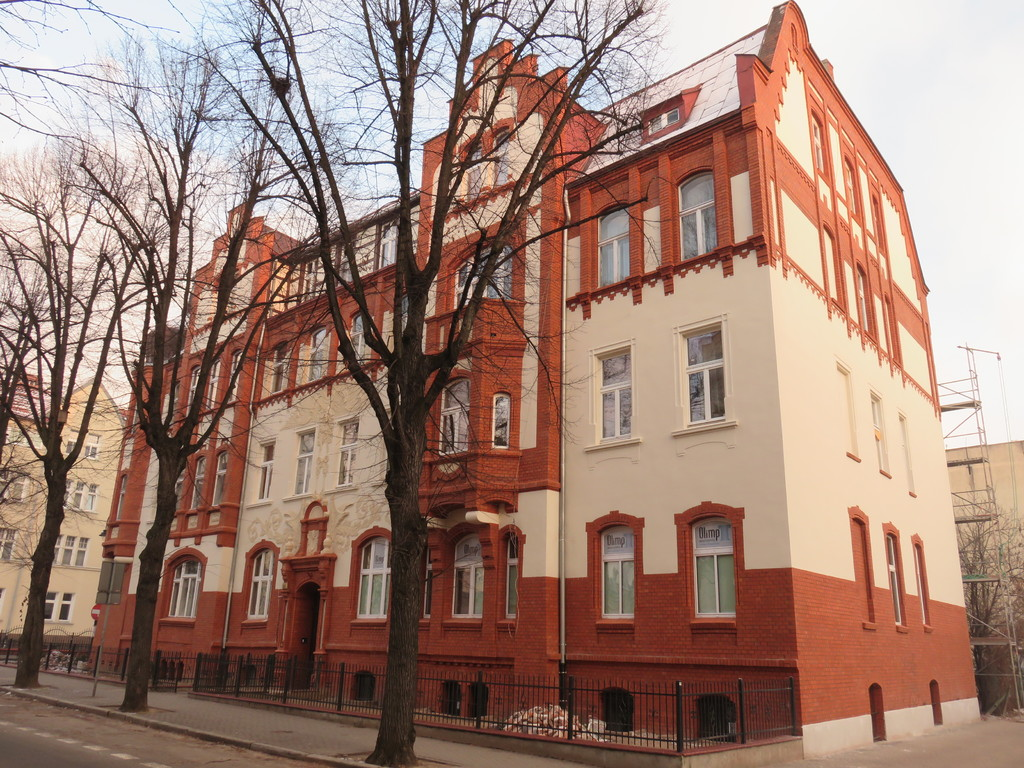
View from Libelta street

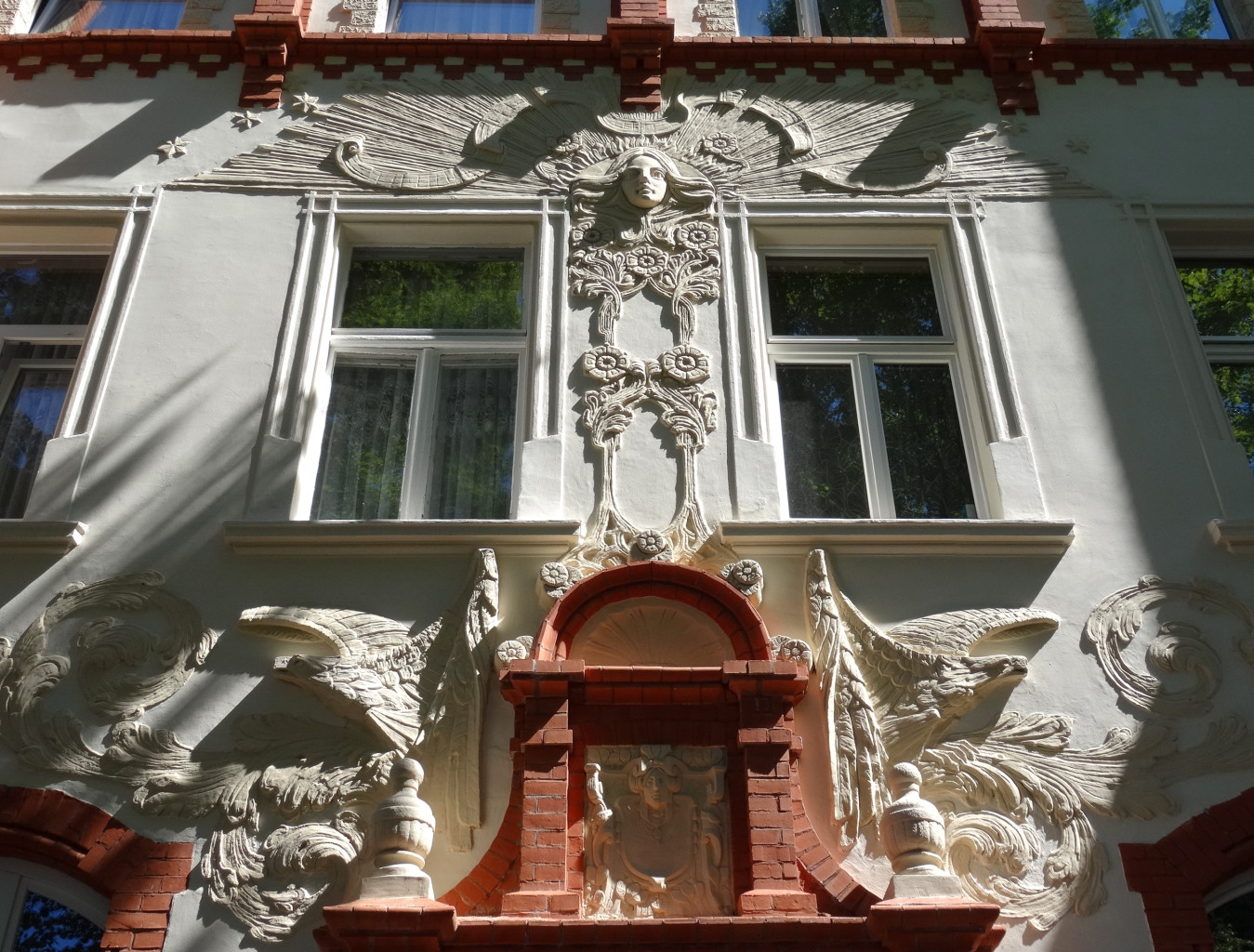
Motifs crowning the gate

=== Tenement at 3 ===
1906-1908

Art Nouveau

Initial address was Roonstraße 10. The first landlord was Constantin Cieslinski, a carpenter who also had the tenement at Nr.5.

Building's frontage displays particularly Art Nouveau style. On the ground floor, windows are topped with geometrical moldings, and the gate is adorned by an impressive frame, full of motifs (curved shapes, pilasters, vegetal forms). The gate still possesses its original numbering "10" from the Prussian times. Upper levels have lost their decoration: the main gable still boasts a large Art Nouveau ornamentation, including a male face, mingled with long curvy hair, flowers and other ornaments.

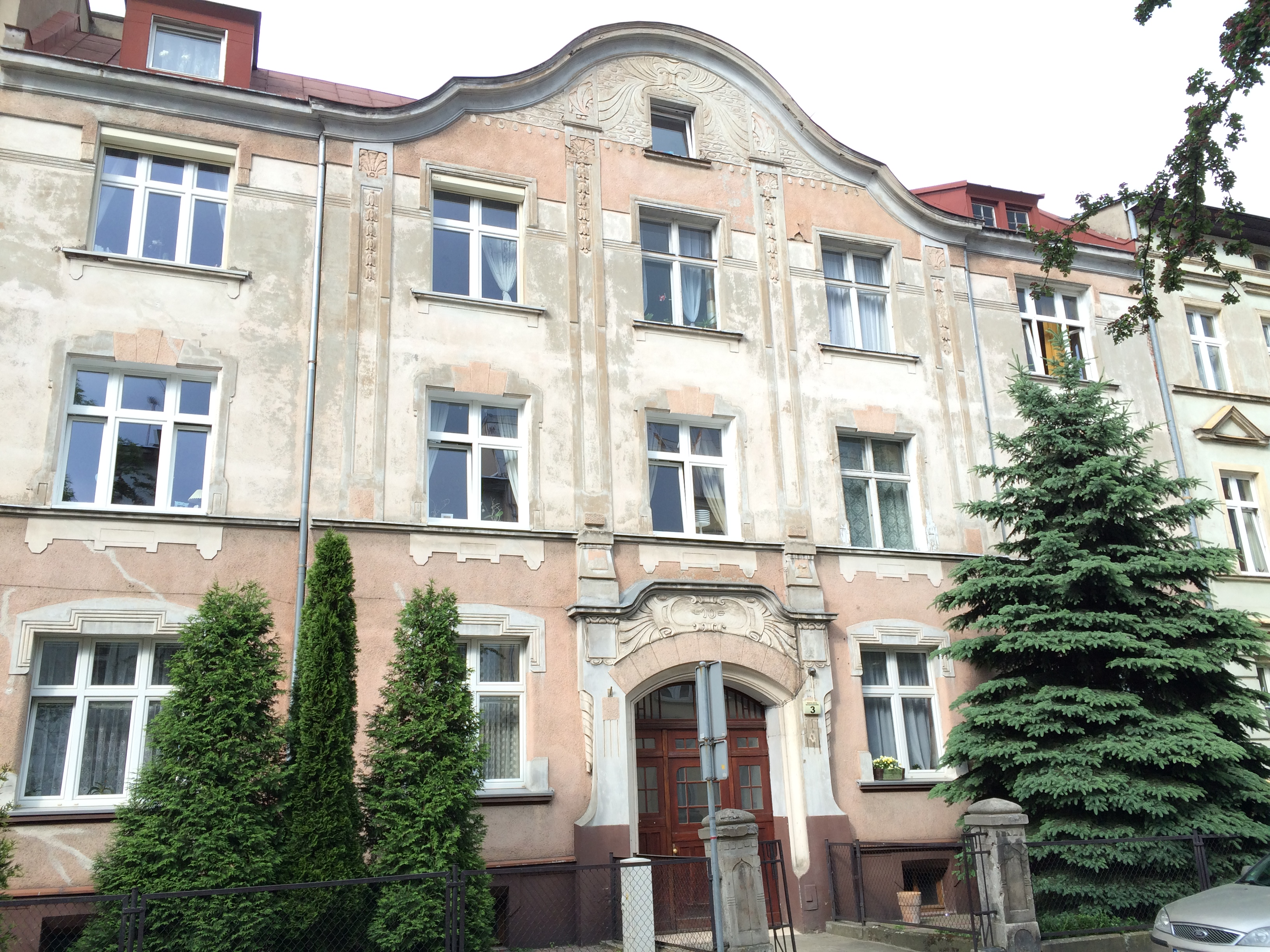
Main elevation

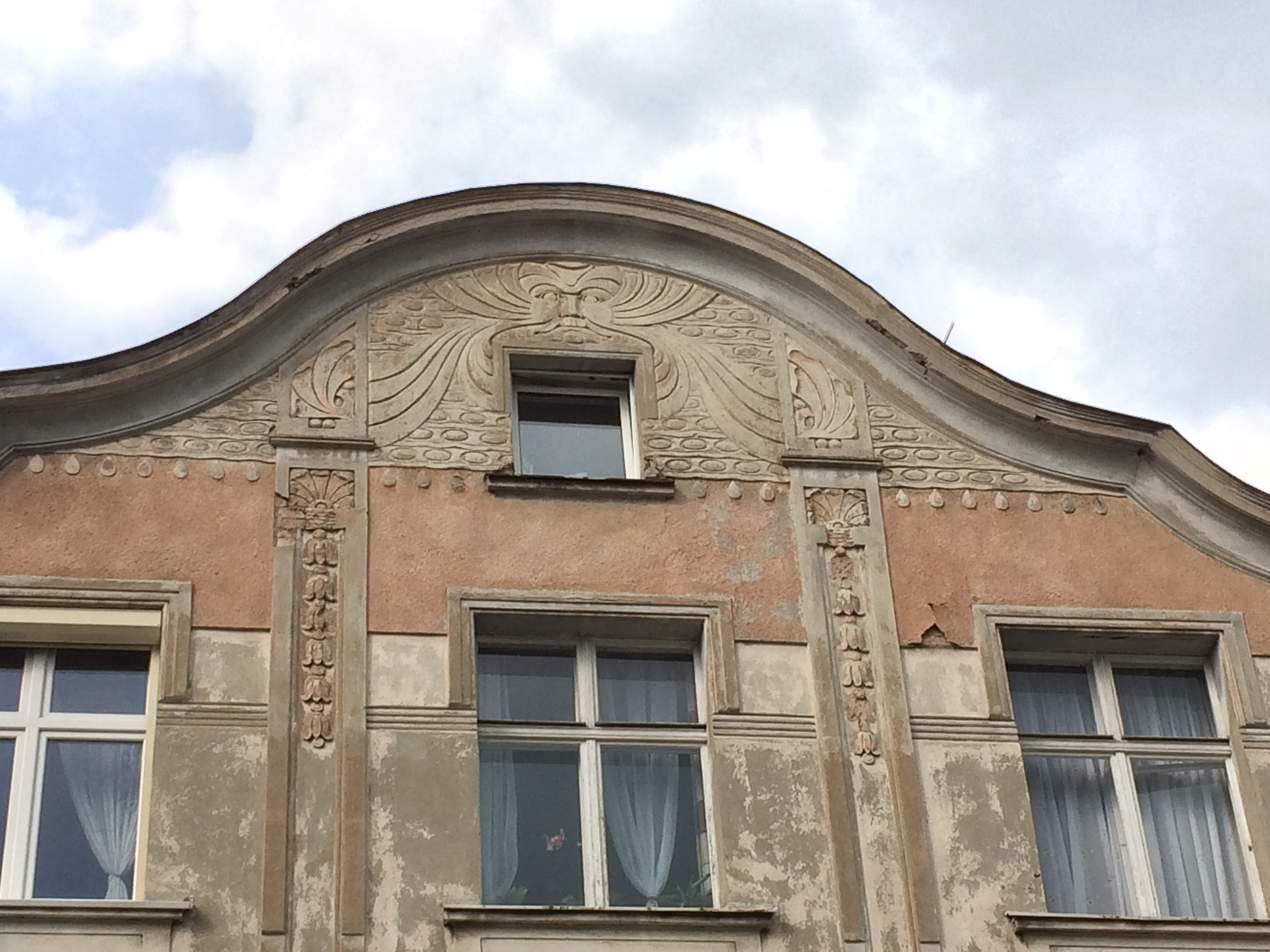
View of the gable

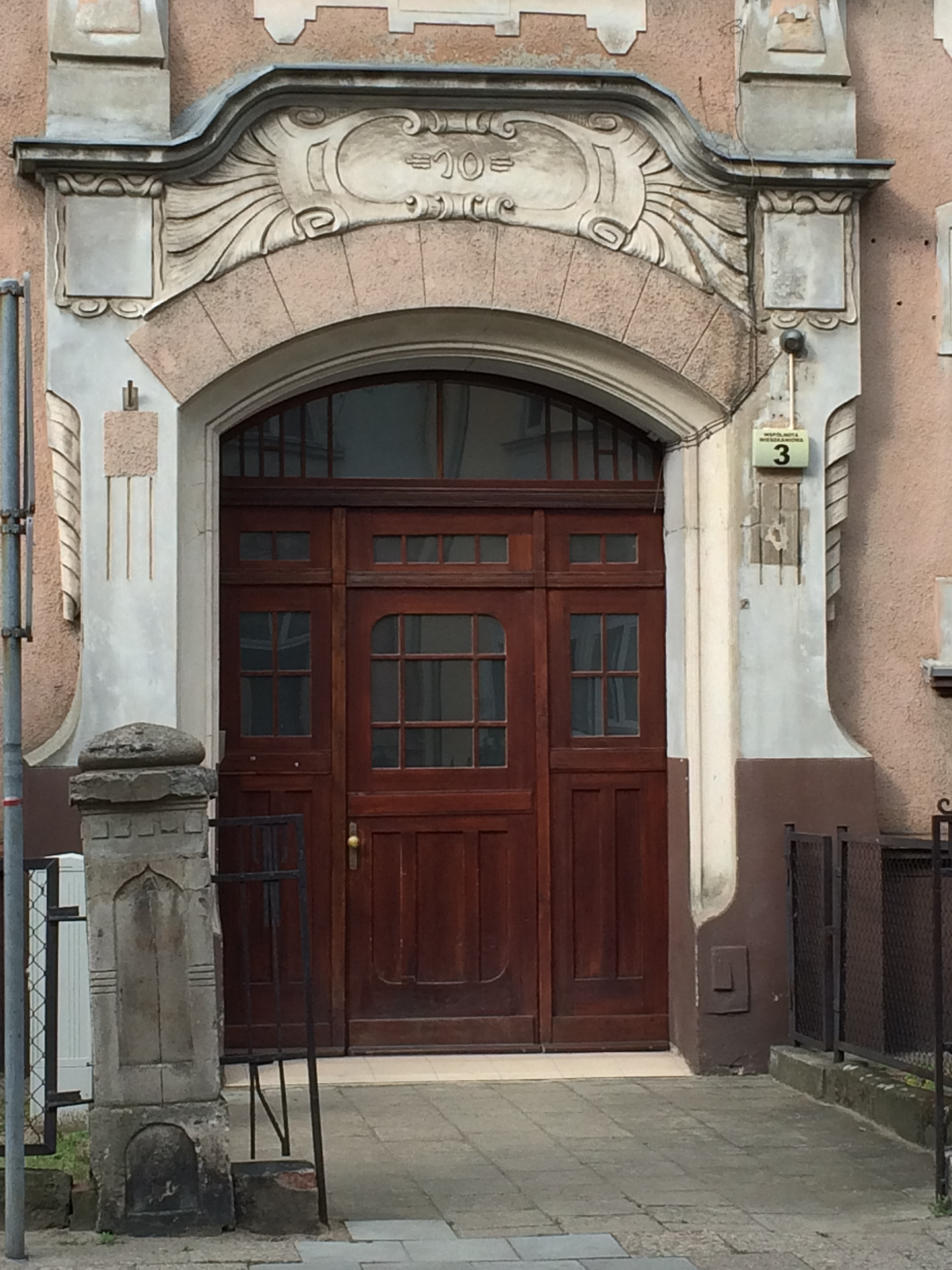
Detail of the gate

=== Tenement at 4 ===
1898-1899

Eclecticism, forms of early Art nouveau

Roonstraße 5 was property of the Independent Order of Odd Fellows lodge in Bydgoszcz until World War I. The lodge itself was located at Roonstraße 6, via a small pathway leading to the backyard (now the path leading to the backyard of Nr.4). The Odd Fellows lodge in Bydgoszcz has been disbanded in 1938, together with other obediences housed in the same edifice. The villa is now at 8 Libelta street.

The facade is hidden behind two old trees, but the avant-corps is well visible. The decoration of the latter is marked with late Eclecticism details:

- pilasters on the ground floor flanking large windows topped with figurative lion heads;
- a pediment with floral motifs;
- round windows on the second floor, crowned by an oeil-de-boeuf ornamented with floral motifs and a woman figure in an ogee-roof gable.
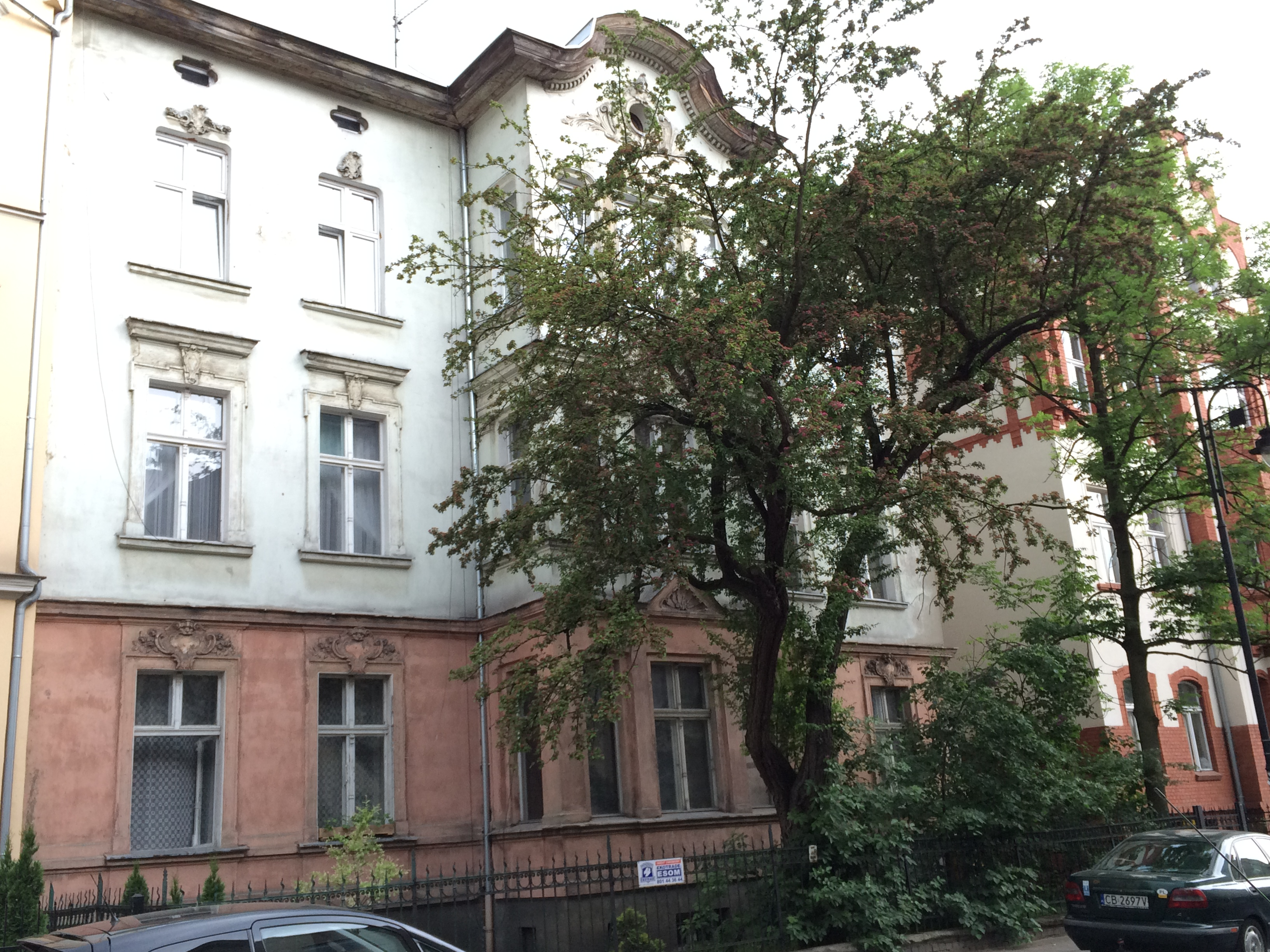
Main elevation

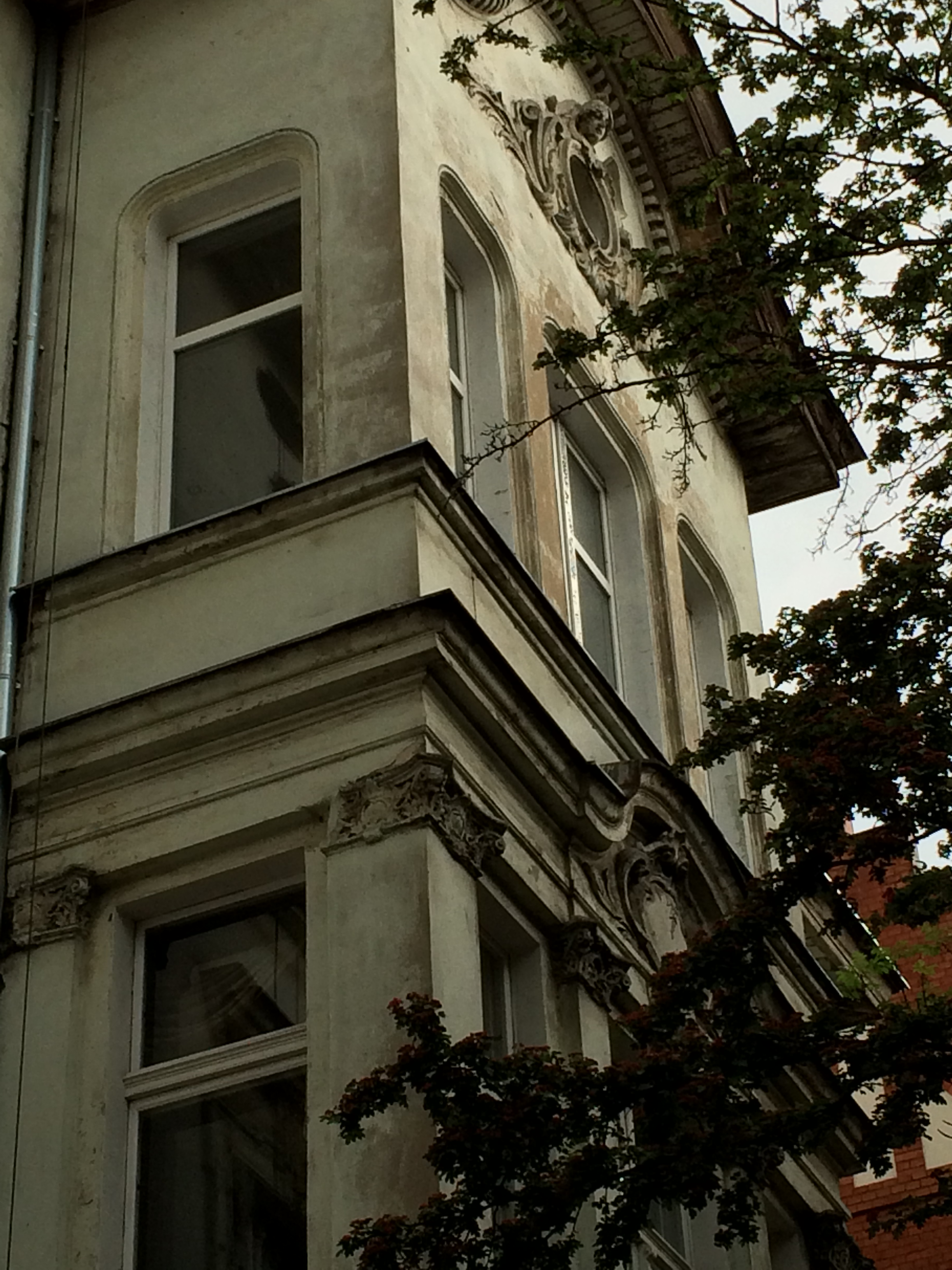
View of the bay window

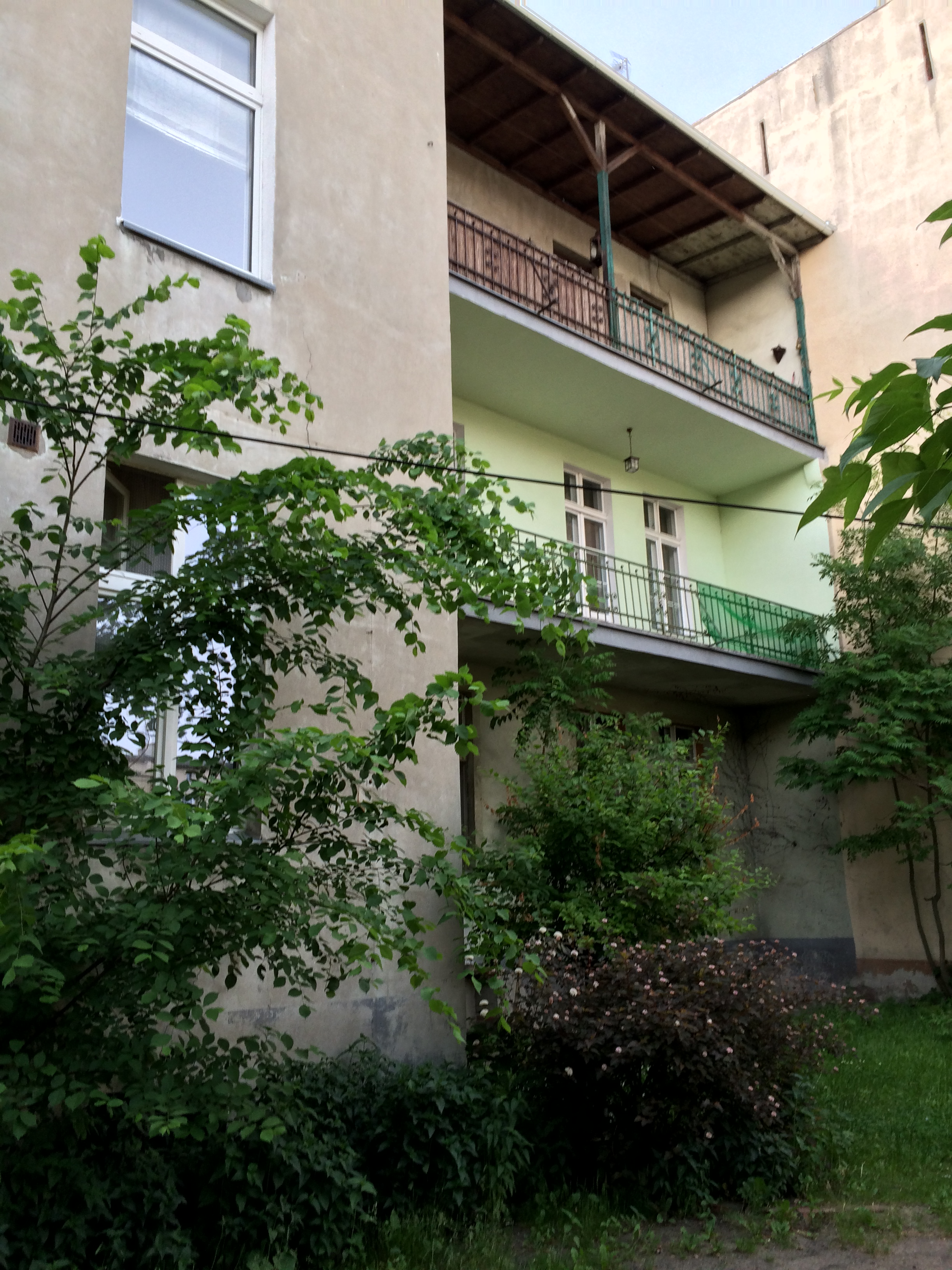
Backyard

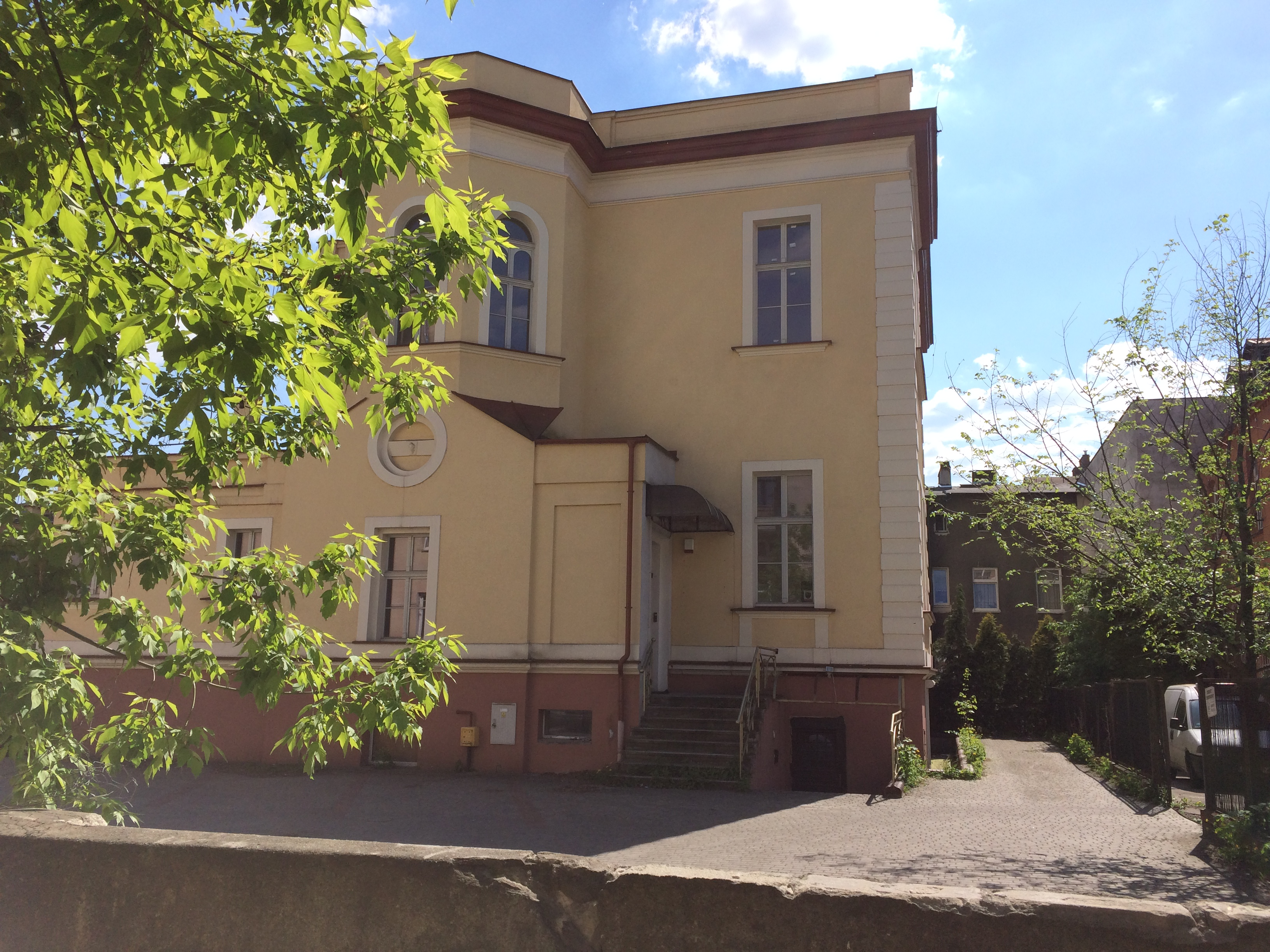
Former odd Fellows lodge, view from Nr.4 backyard

=== Tenement at 5 ===
1897, by Józef Święcicki

Neoclassical architecture

Initial address was Roonstraße 11. The first landlord was Ignatz Czarnecki, a rentier who also owned and lived at Nr.3. After the restoration of Poland in 1920 and the Peace of Riga with USSR, the edifice housed displaced Polish families from the Eastern Borderlands, such as Mrs Korybut-Daszkiewiczów, wife of Michał Kolankowski, wealthy owner of a factory producing stoneware pipes near Novgorod.

The tenement, although built two years prior its neighbour at Nr.3, is characterised by neo-classicism, still in vogue at the end of the 19th century. The facade features order, symmetry and tidiness with a nice entry gate, pediments on first floor windows and a triangular pediment capping the slight avant-corps of the gate.

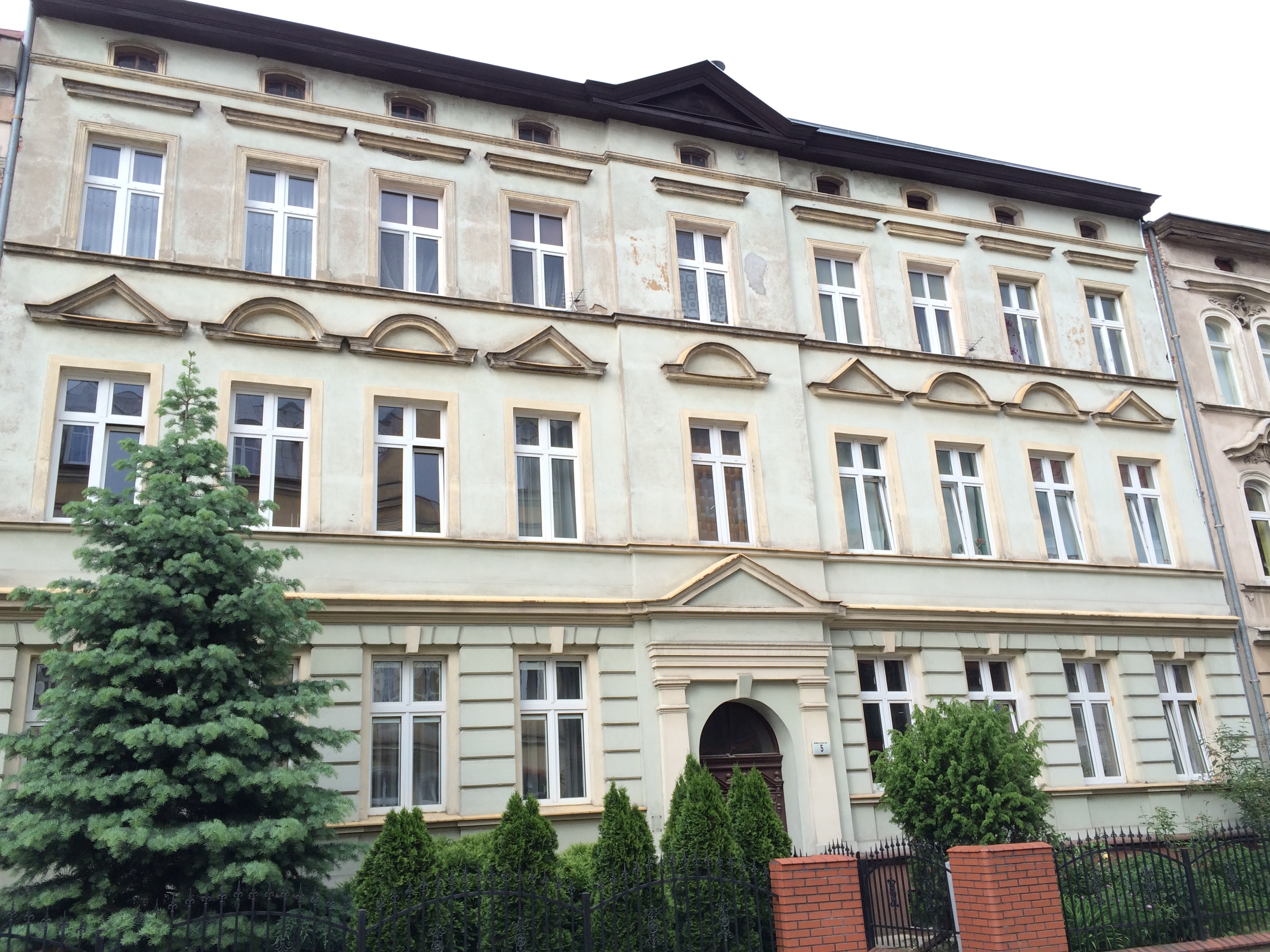
Main elevation

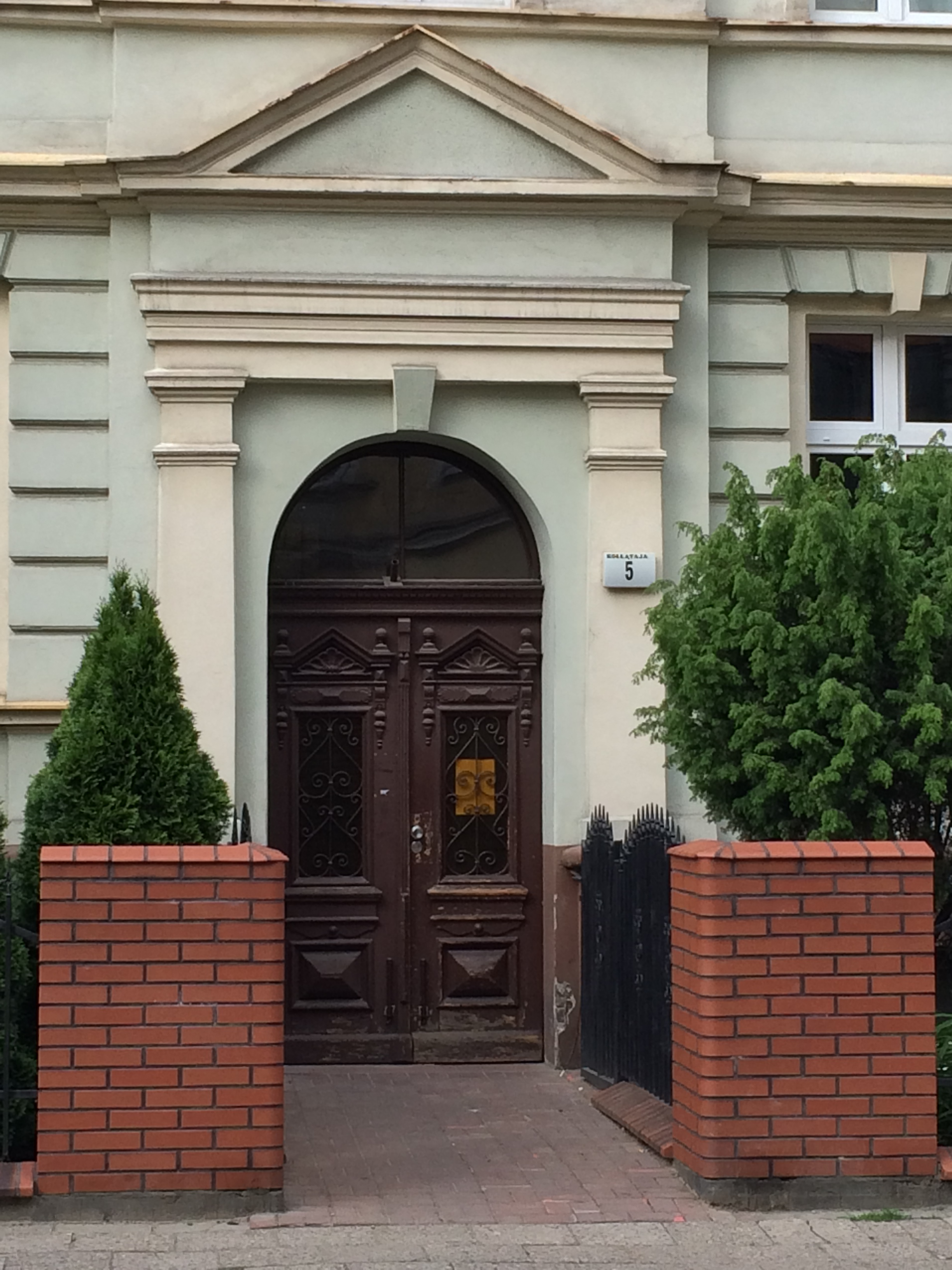
Entry gate

=== Tenement at 6 ===
ca 1900

Eclecticism

Initial address was Roonstraße 4: the tenement was owned by Carl Gau, a master painter till World War I.

The elevation is a particular example of eclectic style. The asymmetry is characterised by two bay windows of different shapes, with adorned bottoms. One can also highlight the two ogee shaped wall dormers. The facade echoes Fritz Weidner's realisations in Bydgoszcz:

- Thomas Frankowski Tenement (Bydgoszcz);
- 79 Gdańska Street;
- Carl Bradtke Tenement in Bydgoszcz;
- 13/15 August Cieszkowski Street.
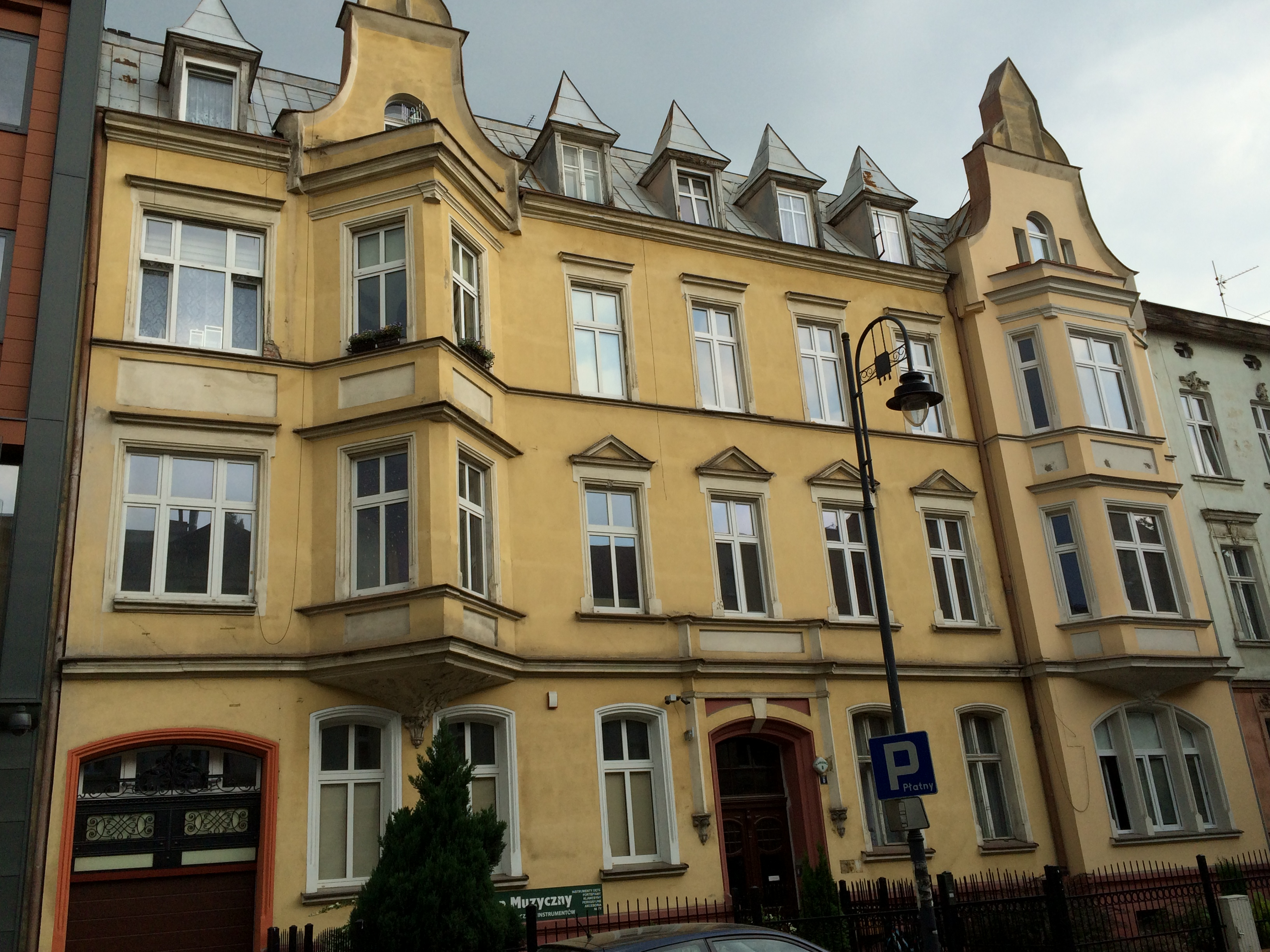
Main elevation

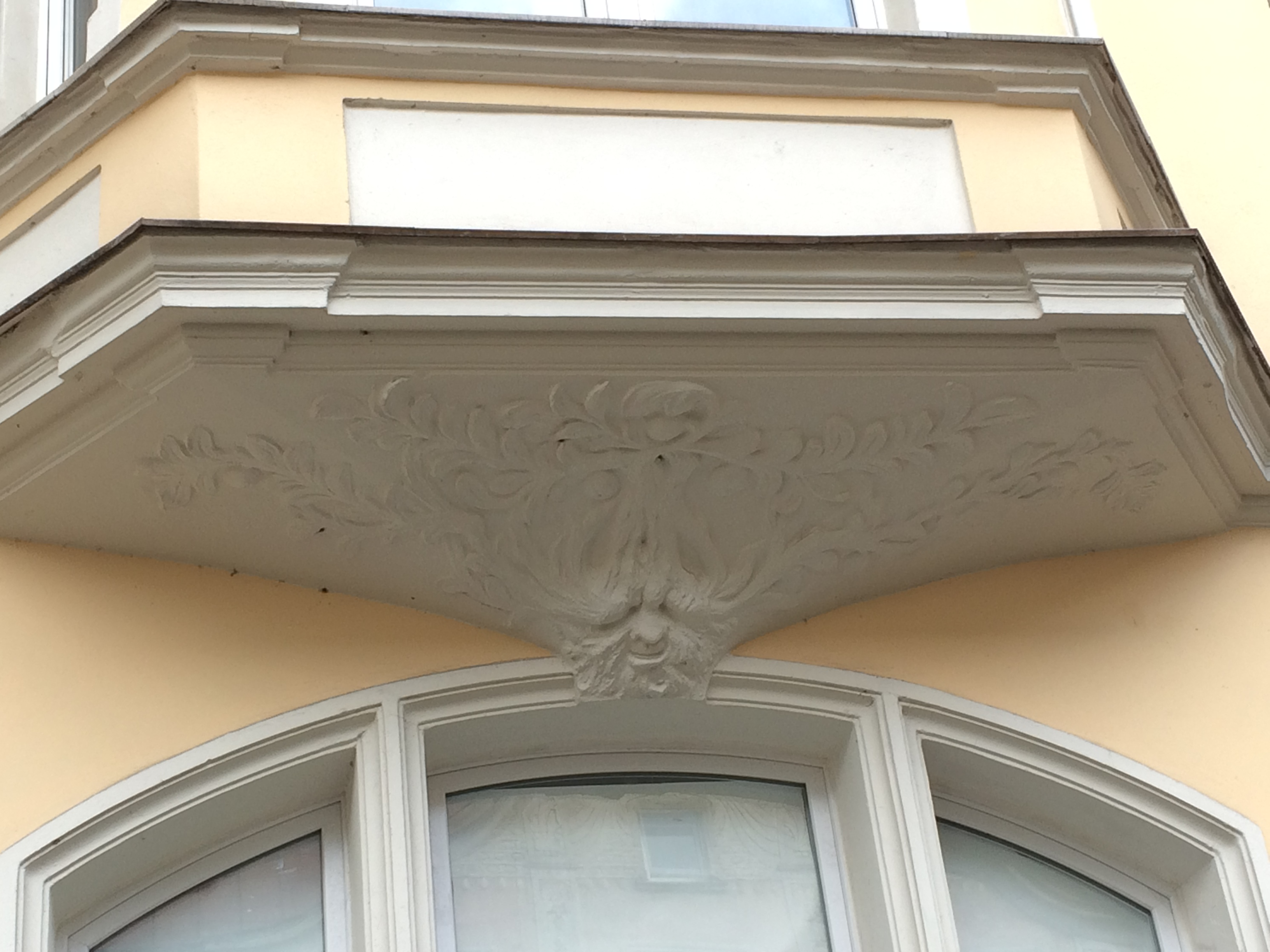
Bottom of a bay window

=== Tenement at 7 ===
1897-1898

Eclecticism, forms of Neo-Baroque

Initial address was Roonstraße 12: the first owner of the tenement was Ignacß Mikulski, a farmer.

The eclectic style is particularly pregnant on the facade. There is a mix of neo-classical details (disposition of the openings, symmetry) and neo-baroque elements (abundance of motifs in the pediments, bay-window flanked with columns).

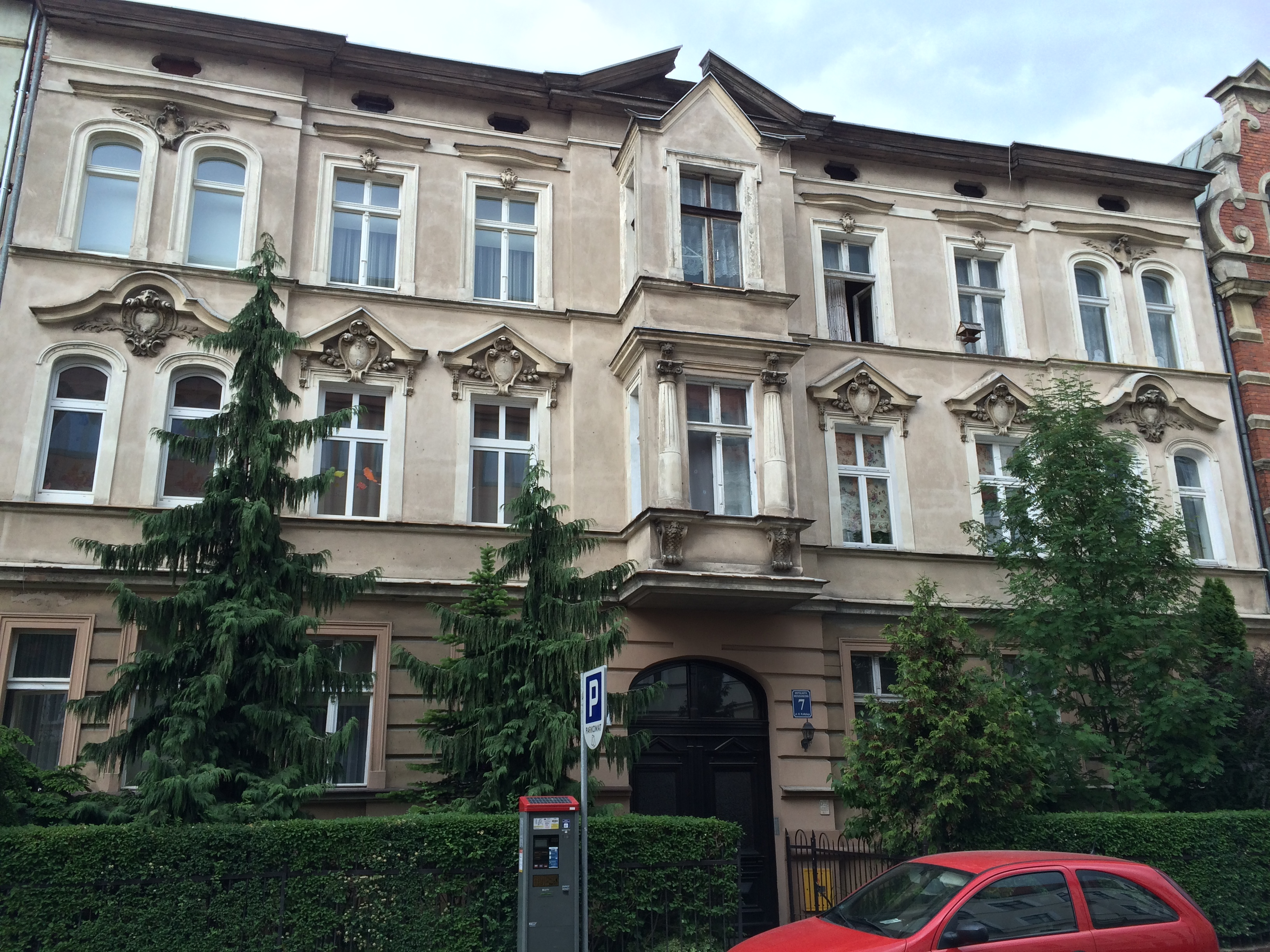
Main elevation

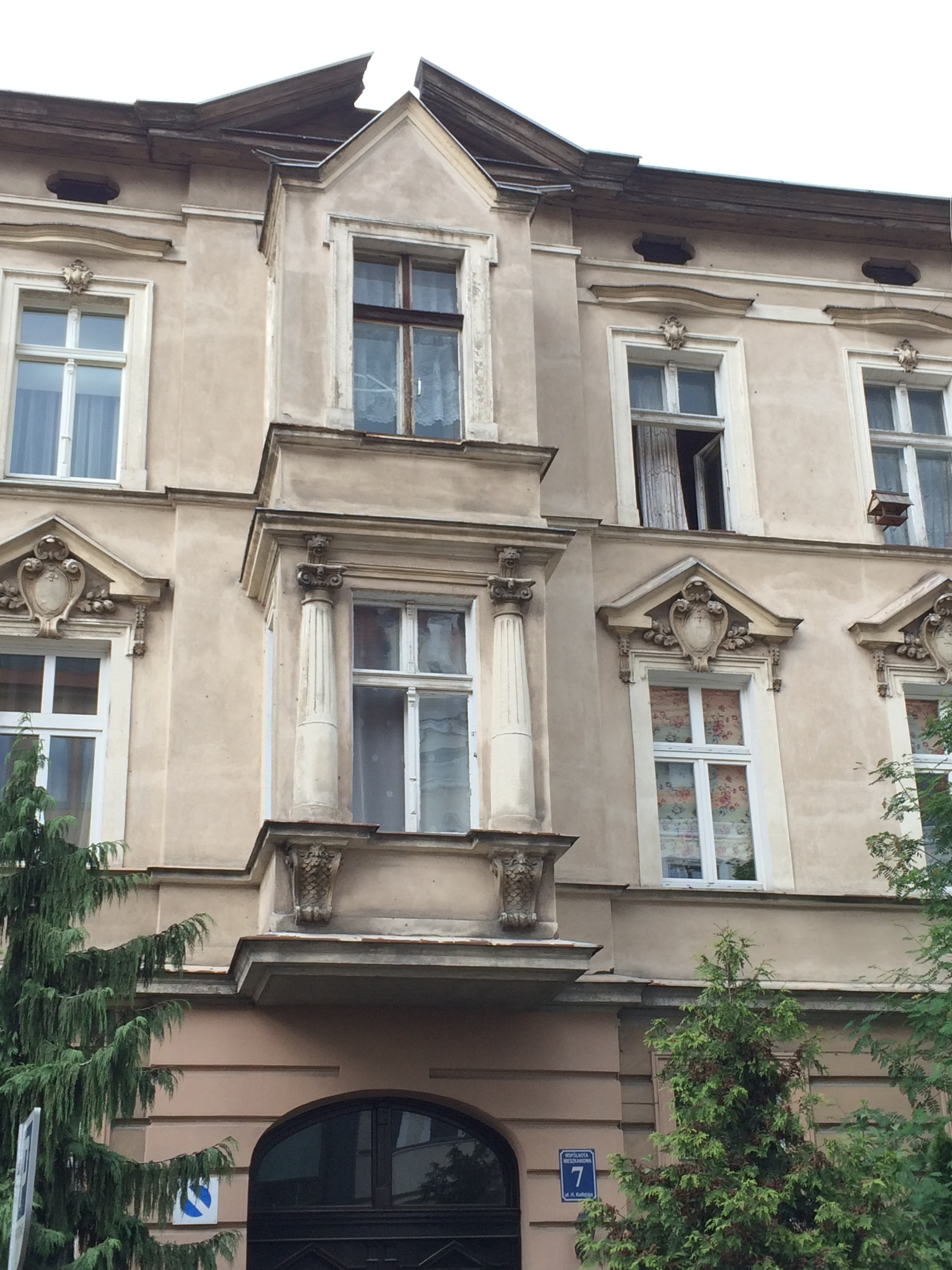
Bay window detail

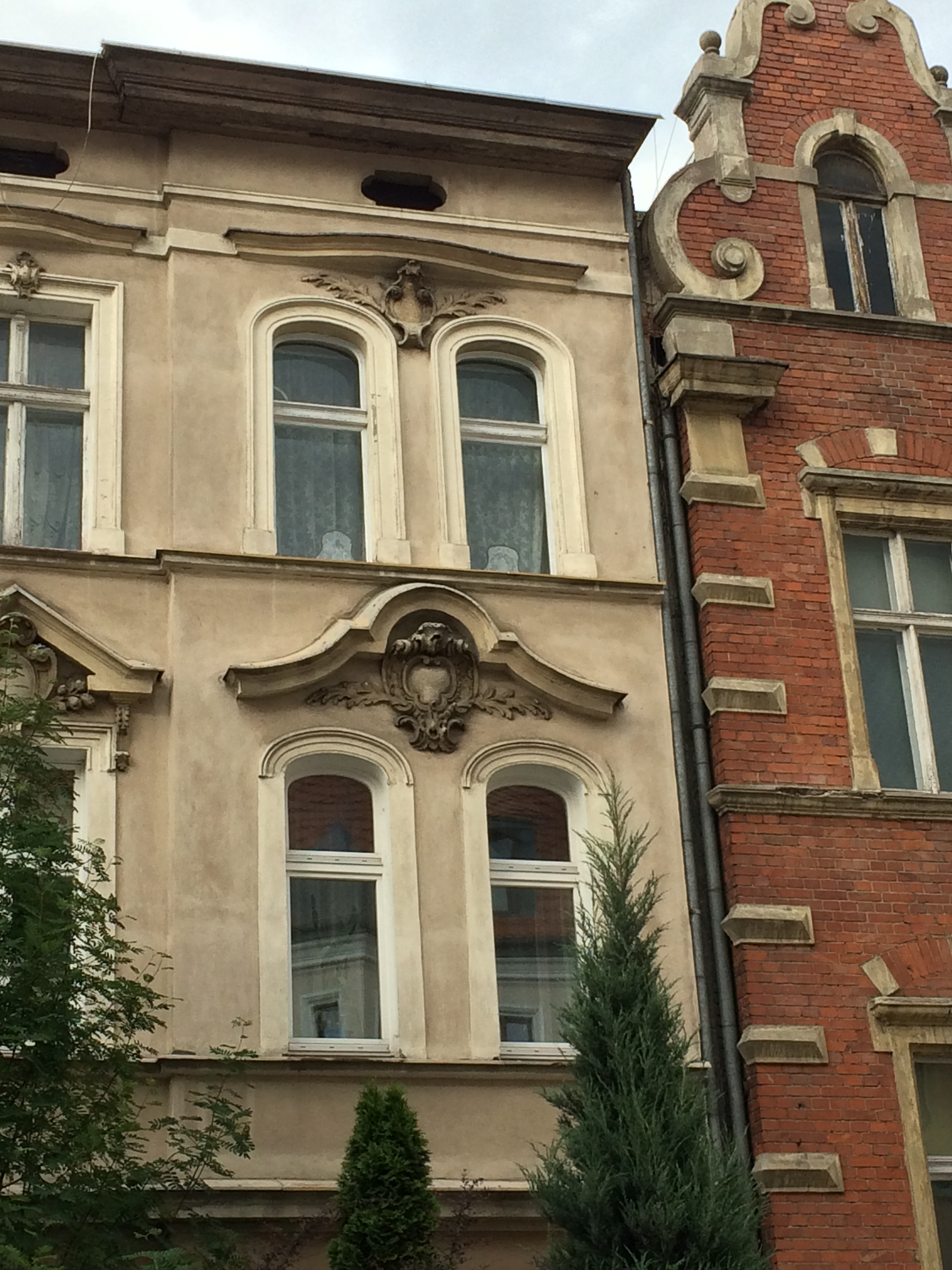
Window decoration

=== Tenement at 8 ===
2015

Modern architecture

Initial address was Roonstraße 3: the plot was owned by Carl Gau, a master painter, landlord at Nr.6. The area stayed without any habitation building till after World War II. it is today the seat of the Cooperative bank in Bydgoszcz (Polish: Bank Polskiej Spółdzielczości S.A w Bydgoszczy).

Current building has been realised in 2014 by the firm "Nowoczesne Elewacje". It is made of titanium zinc and Keratwin ceramic tile.

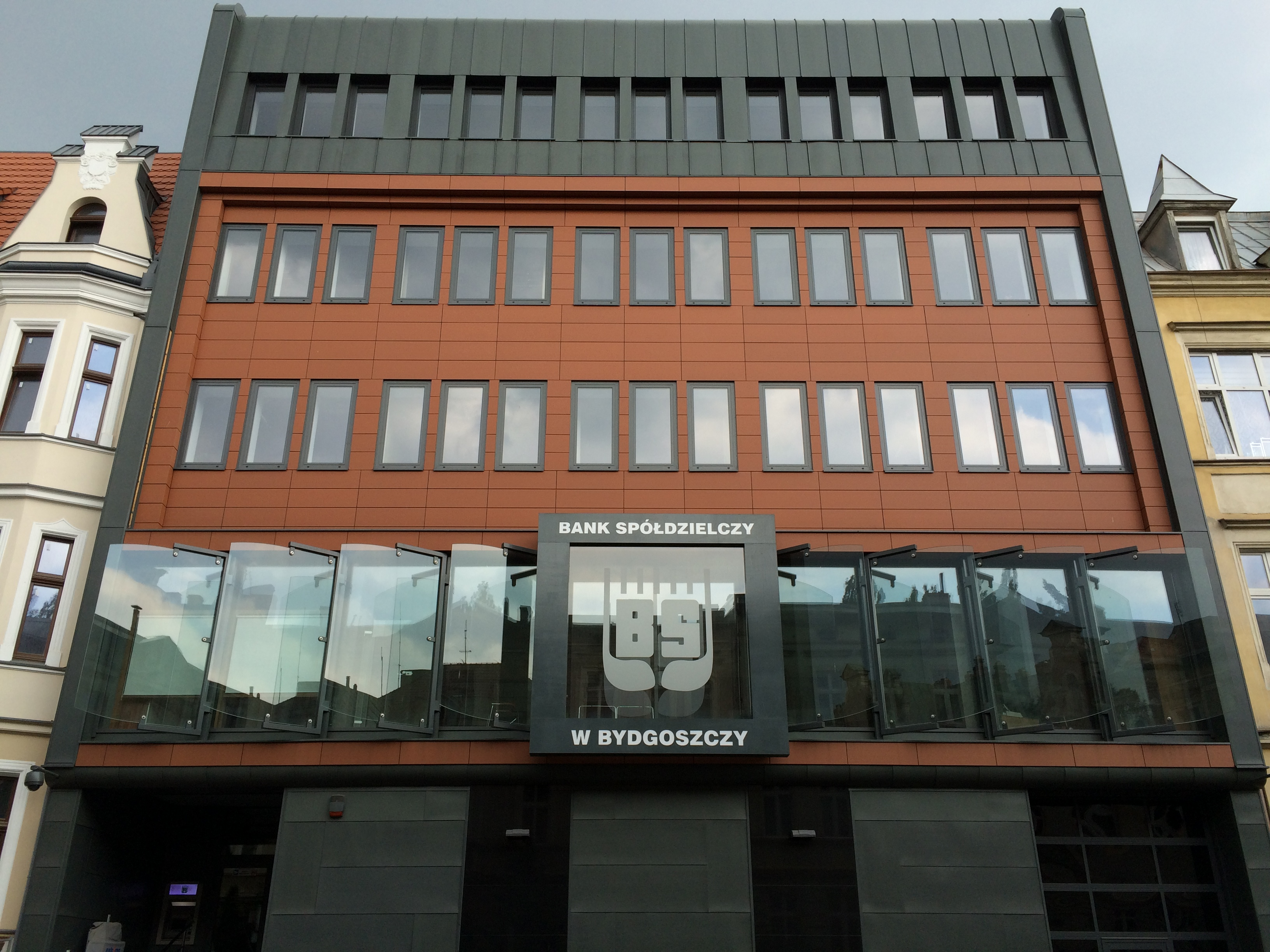
Main facade

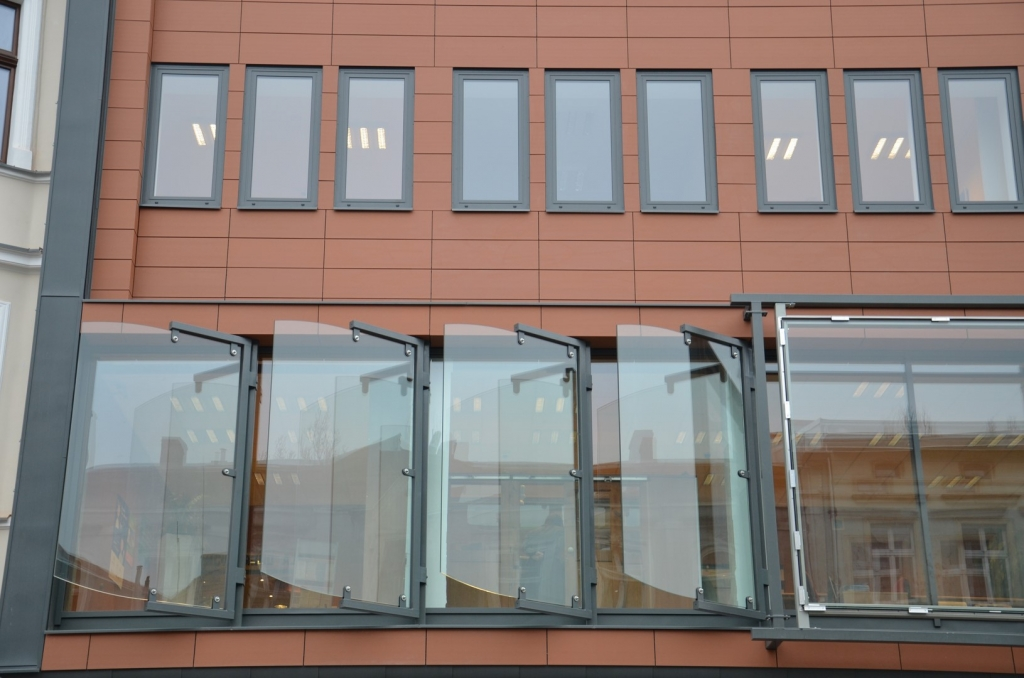
Detail of the facade

=== Ancient shelter for blinds, at 9 corner with Staszica street ===
Registered on Kuyavian-Pomeranian Voivodeship heritage list, Nr.A/1569, August 26, 2010

1899–1901, by Karl Bergner

Eclecticism & Dutch Mannerism

Built at the beginning of the 20th century, the edifice at Roonstraße 13/14 was initially conceived as a refuge for blind children (German: Blindenheim). The initiator of the construction was the director of nearby Educational Centre for Blind Children, Anton Wittig. He organized the "Society for blind people", which, till 1901, collected funds to build a shelter in home Bydgoszcz. The hostel was operational up to 1962, as part of the specialized school. Today the building houses two clinics, Śródmieście (Downtown, 445m^{2}) and Akademicka (Academic, 312m^{2}), and two specialist medical offices for individuals.

In 2015, city authorities have put the building on sale, with an estimated price of 3.5 million PLN.

The building displays eclectic style, with forms referring to Dutch Mannerism. Two other edifices in Bydgoszcz feature such Dutch-mannerist frontages: the former Prussian Eastern Railway Headquarters and the Lloyd palace. Its brick facades are plaster decorated with architectural details. Slight avant-corps, ornamented with bossage, are crowned with volute adorned gables and pinnacles. Windows are topped with cornices. Main entrance on Kołłątaja street bears the inscription "Blindenheim " ("Home for Blind"). It is positioned at the centre of the avant-corps and includes an ornated portal with doric columns.

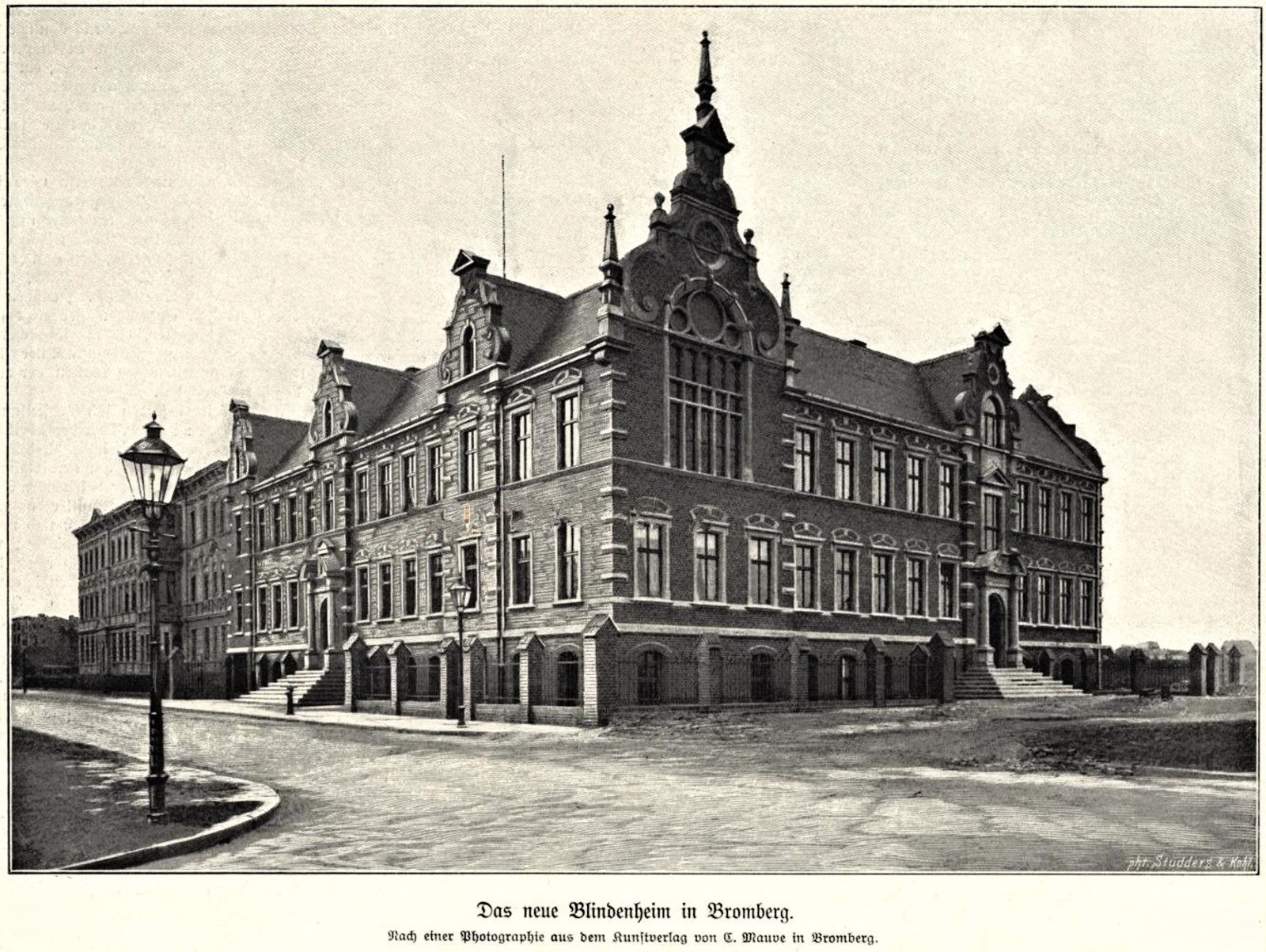
"Blindenheim" ca 1902

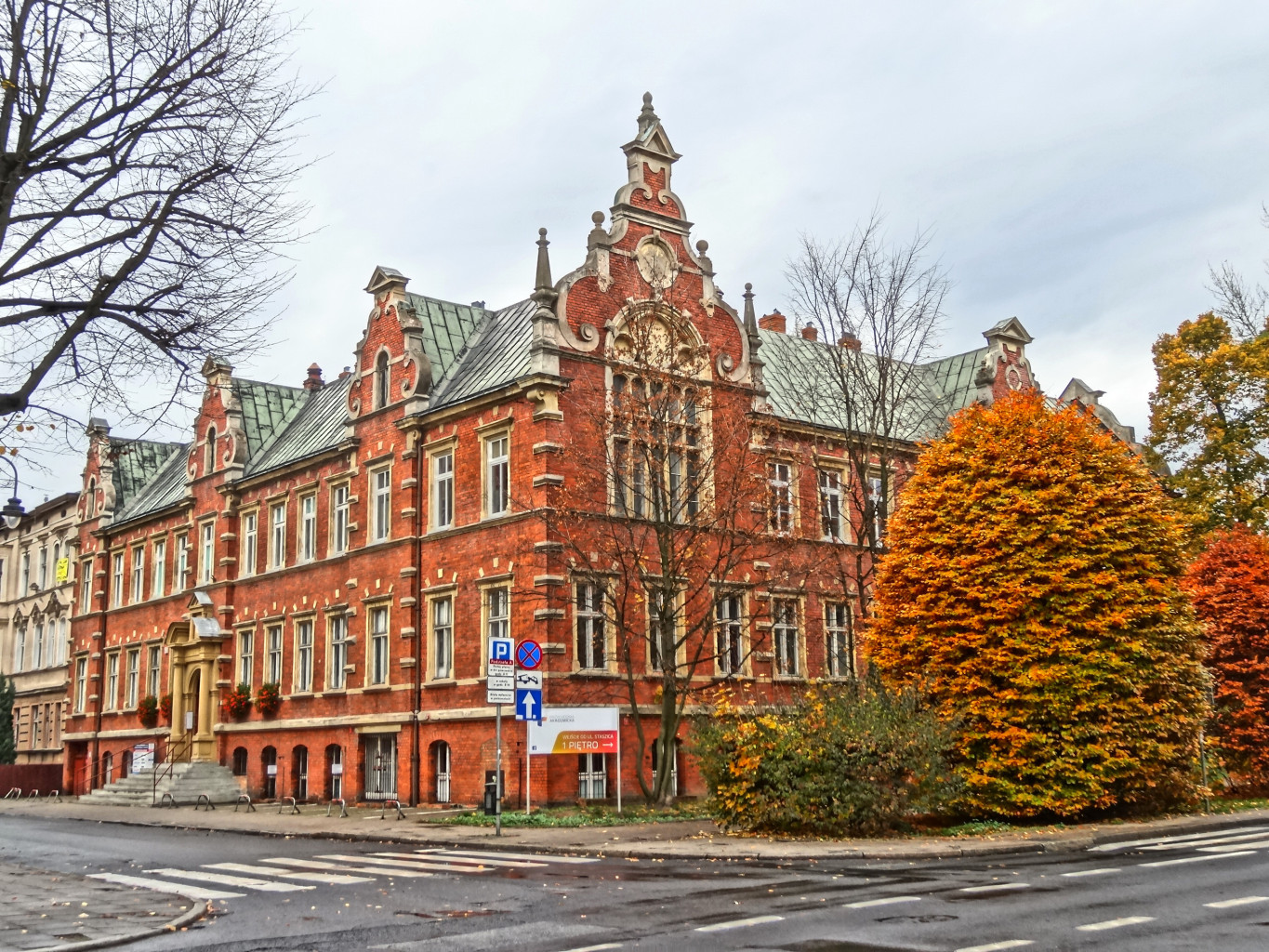
Current view

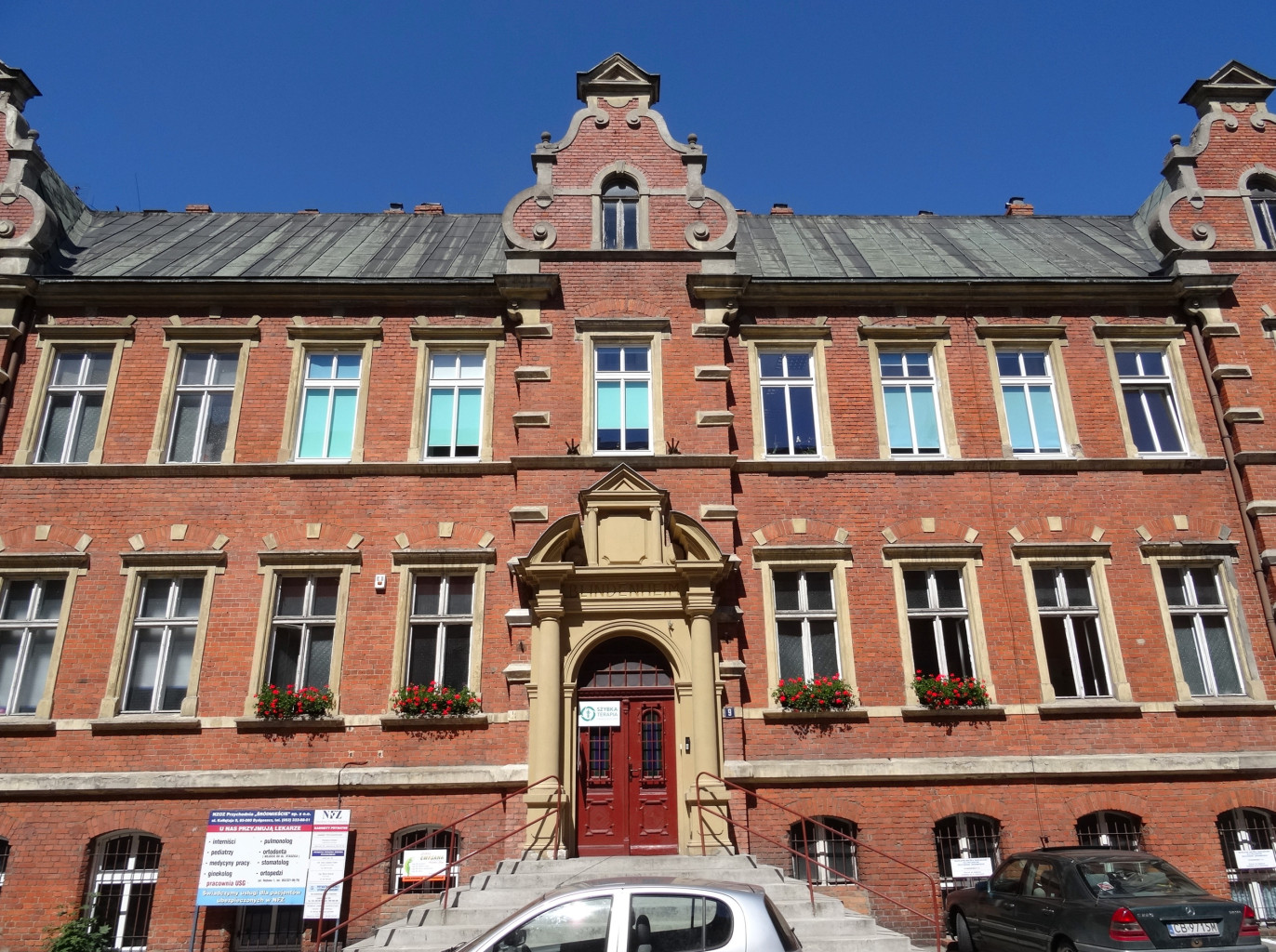
Main elevation on Kołłątaja street

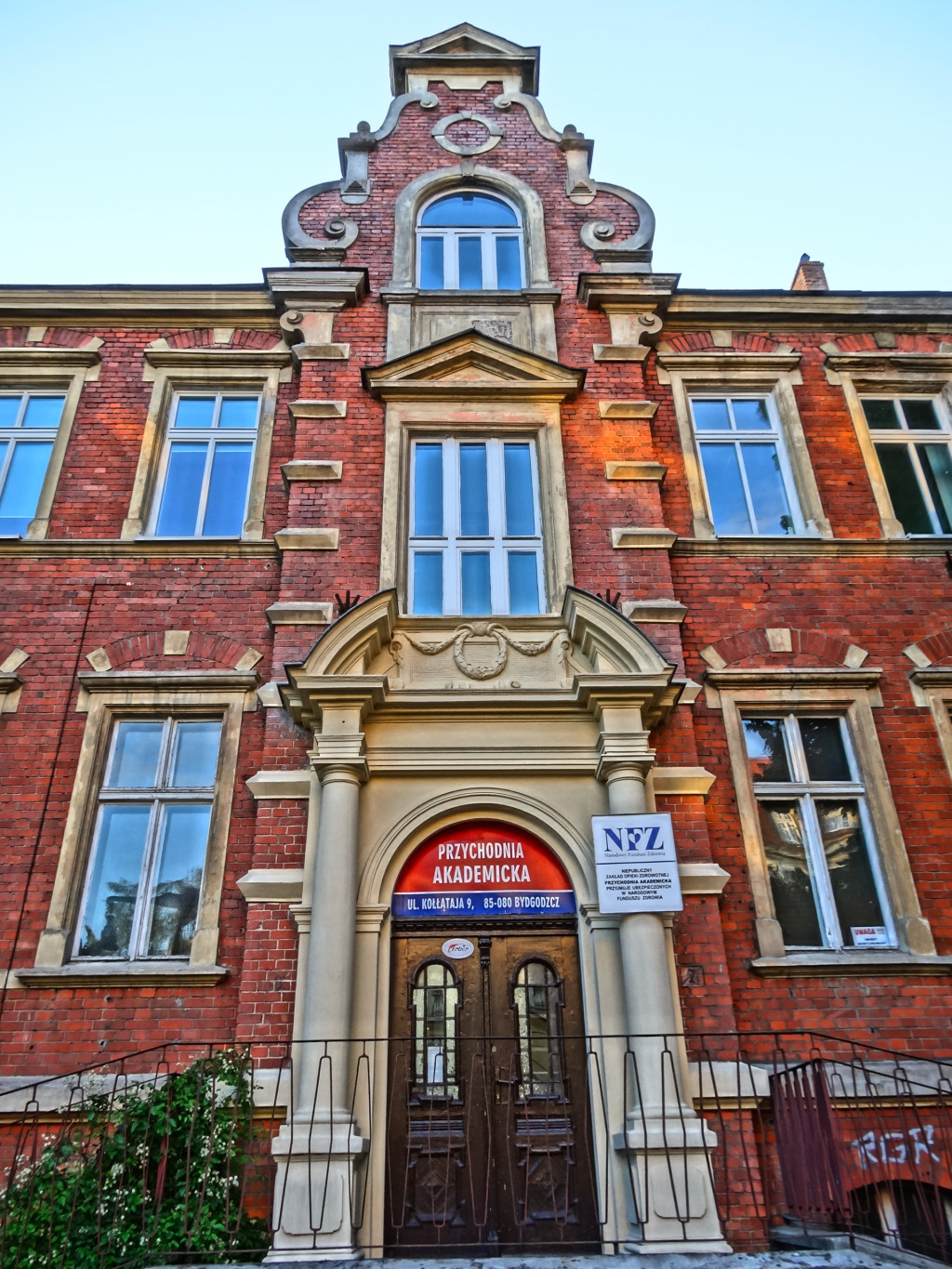
Entrance on Staszica street

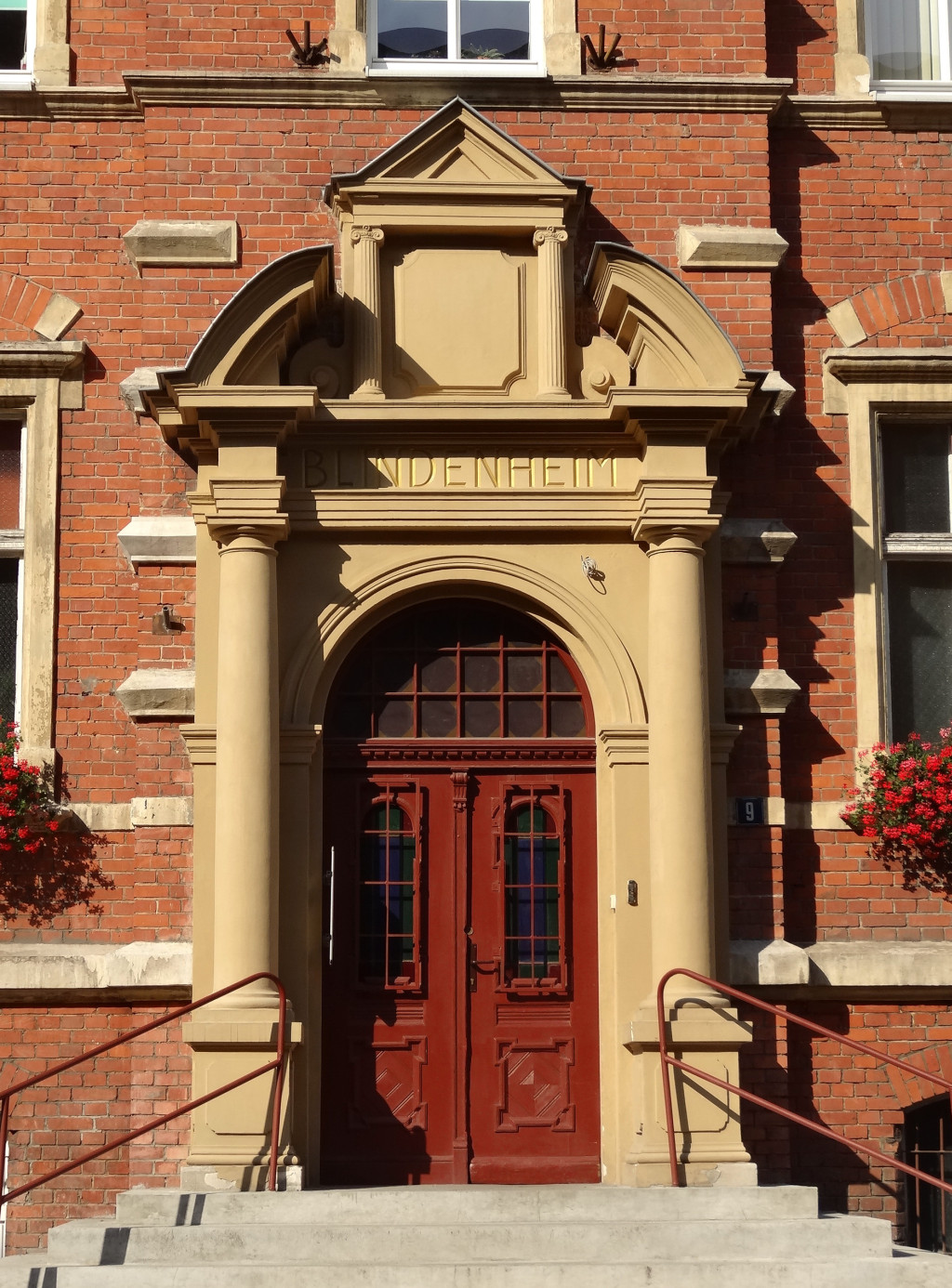
Detail of the portal on Kołłątaja street

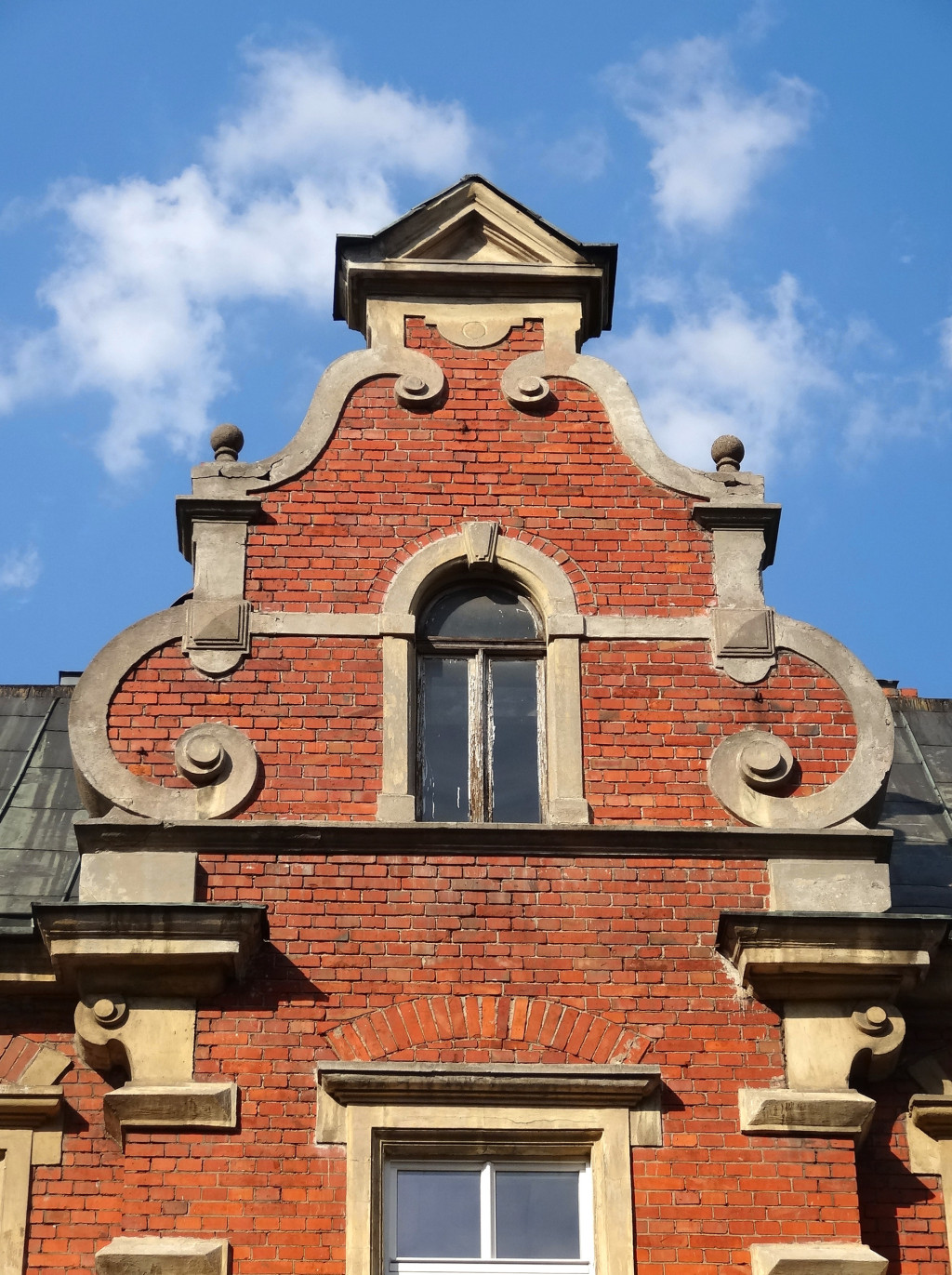
Detail of a gable

=== Jahnte & Bandelow tenement, at 10 ===
1902-1903

Early Art Nouveau

Initial address was Roonstraße 2: the tenement was the property of two merchants, Albert Jahnte and Oskar Bandelow until the end of World War I. The former had a shop in Elisabeth straße. The latter had two selling points for cigars in Bromberg. In 2013, the building was put on sale. It undergoes a thorough restoration through 2016.

The facade boasts early Art Nouveau style, like round shaped avant-corps, balanced by a triangular bay window. Many architectural details are present: the onion dome capped by a tented roof, several dormers including two giving on balconies, the portal adorned with a plastered female figure inside a pediment, topped by vegetal Art Nouveau ornamentation.

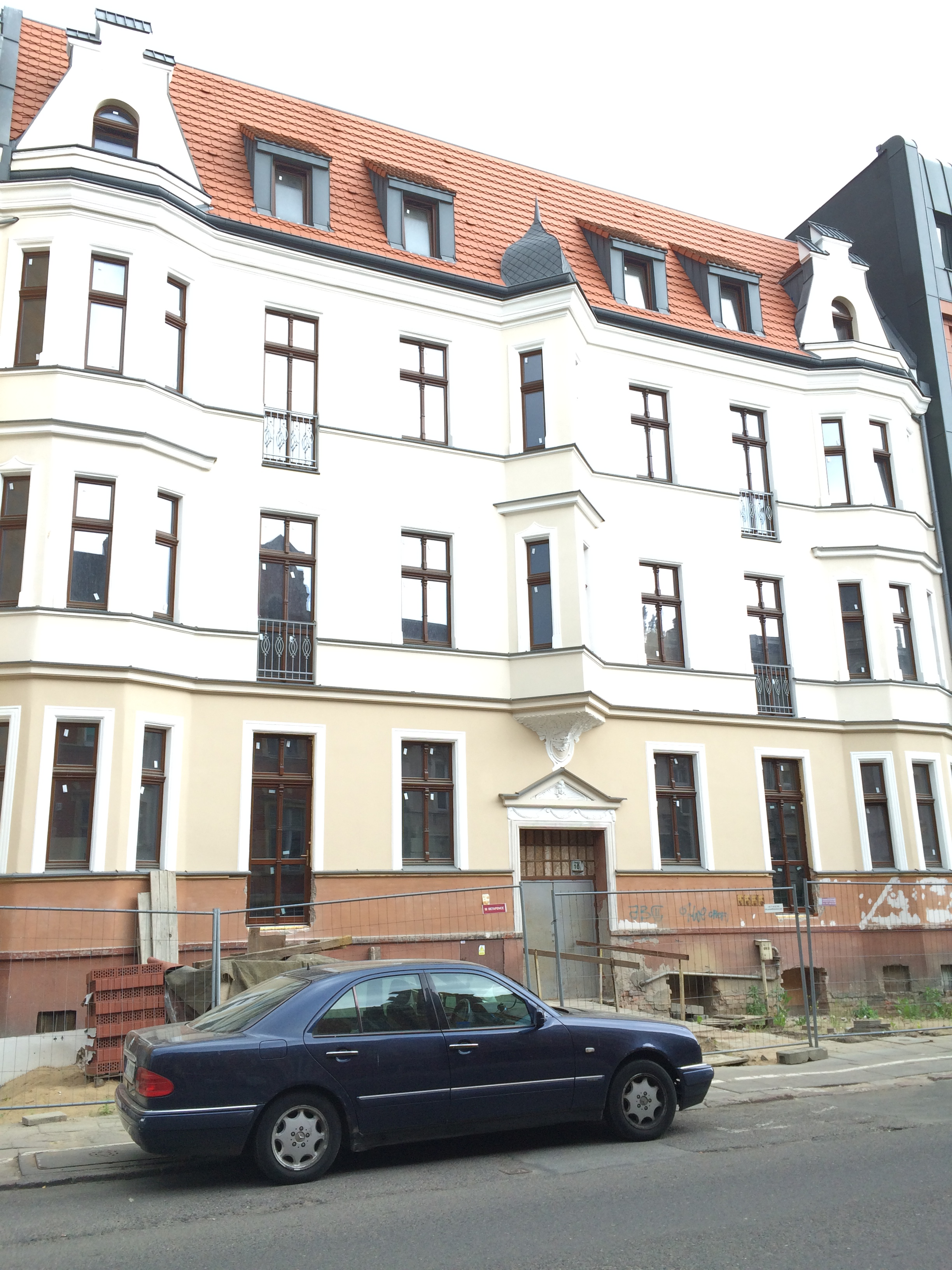
Main facade

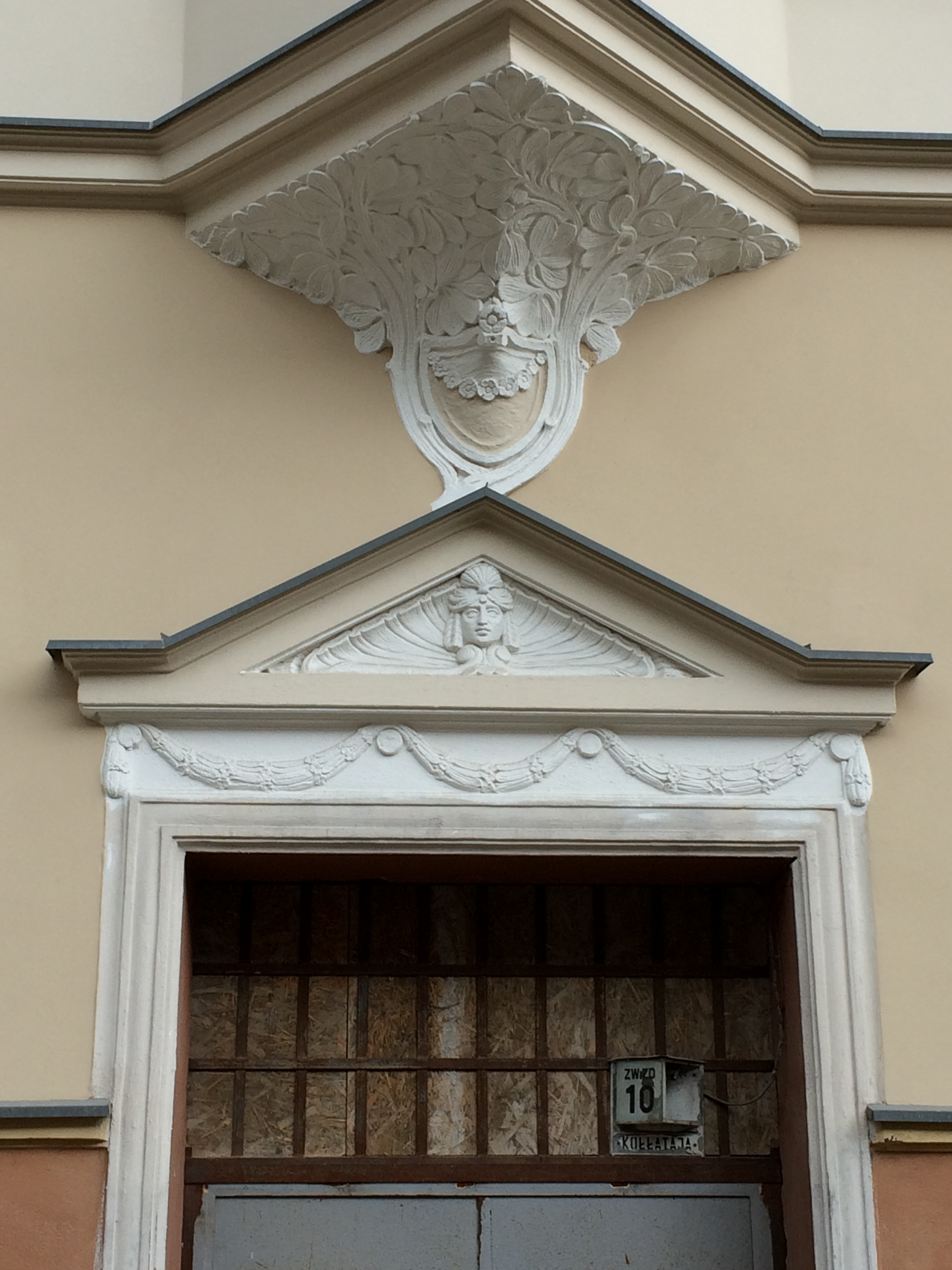
Detail of a bay window

=== Tenement at Staszica street 7, corner with Kołłątaja street ===
1905

Eclecticism

Initial address was Braesicke straße 5: the tenement was owned by the municipality, under the name "City apartment association" (German: Wohnungsverein Gehörig). After the restoration of Poland in 1920, it changed to its Polish equivalent structure, Polish: Towarzystwo mieszkaniowe. In 1983, it was purchased to the benefit of Bydgoszcz Music Academy - "Feliks Nowowiejski" to house music school departments and lodgings for students. Today, it is part of the network of Bydgoszcz Academy of Music teaching buildings, all located downtown. The tenement also includes:

- a dormitory. Together with the building at 4 Szwalbego, they offer 90 beds;
- a concert hall with 100 seats, situated in the backyard of the tenement at Nr5.

The building abuts both streets. On Kołłątaja street there is a sharp triangular bay window topped by a high pitched tented roof with a finial, and on Staszica street a slight avant-corps topped with curves and simili pilasters. Both sides display a series of shed dormers, as well as entry gates adorned with a large lintel (Staszica street), and lighter one with flower motifs and the head of a woman (Kołłątaja side).

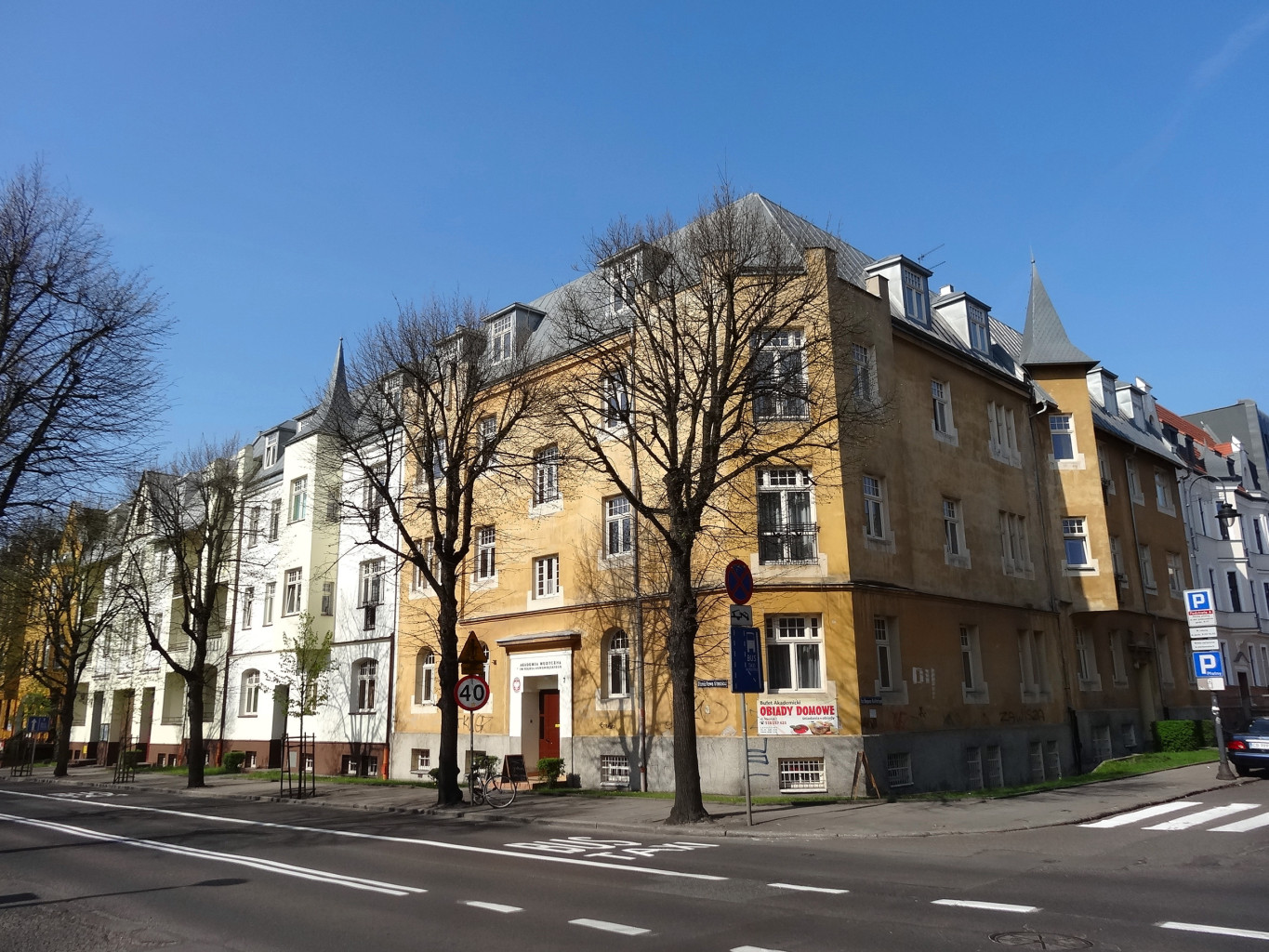
View of the building at 7 Staszica

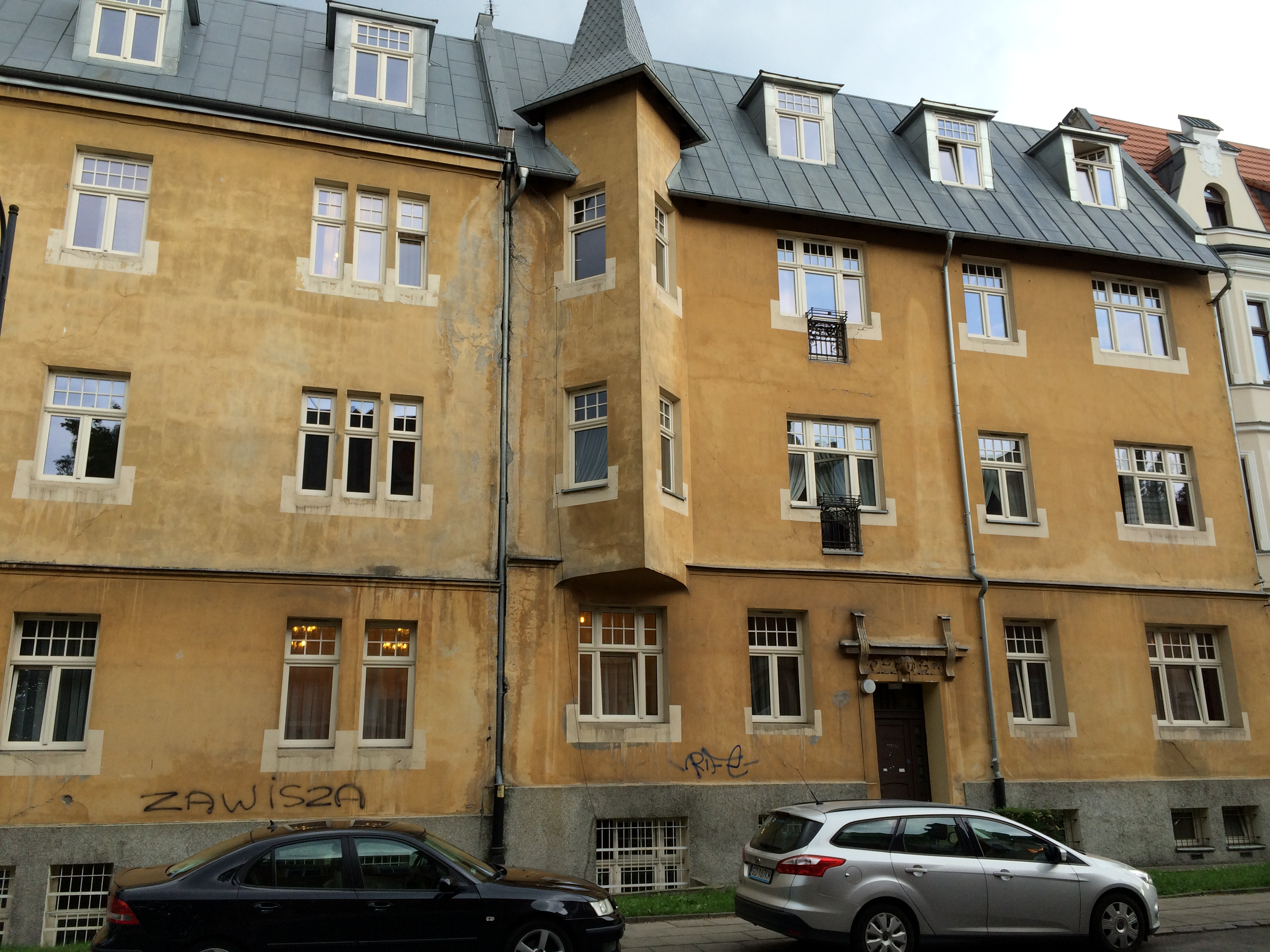
Facade on Kołłątaja street

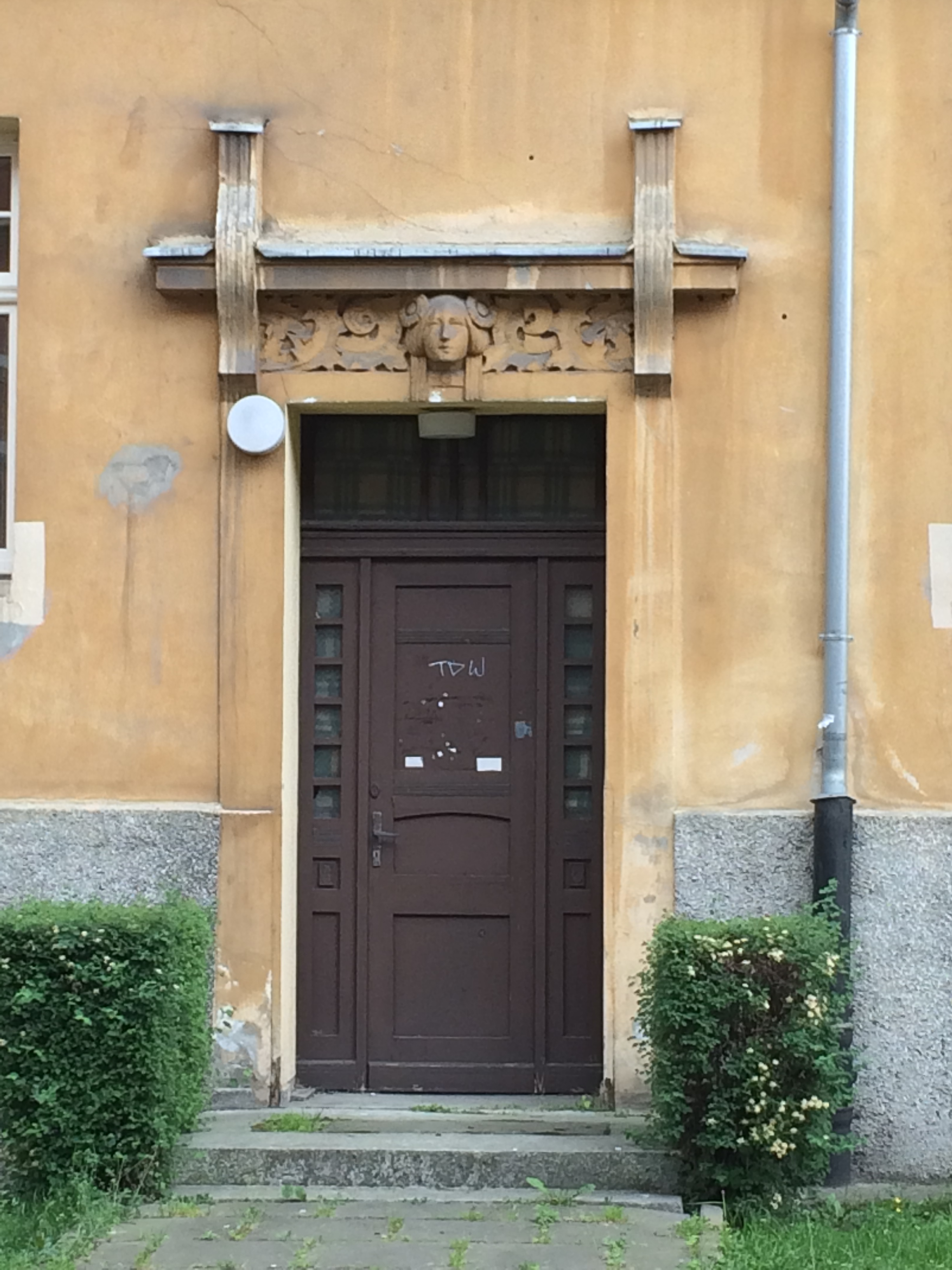
Gate on Kołłątaja street

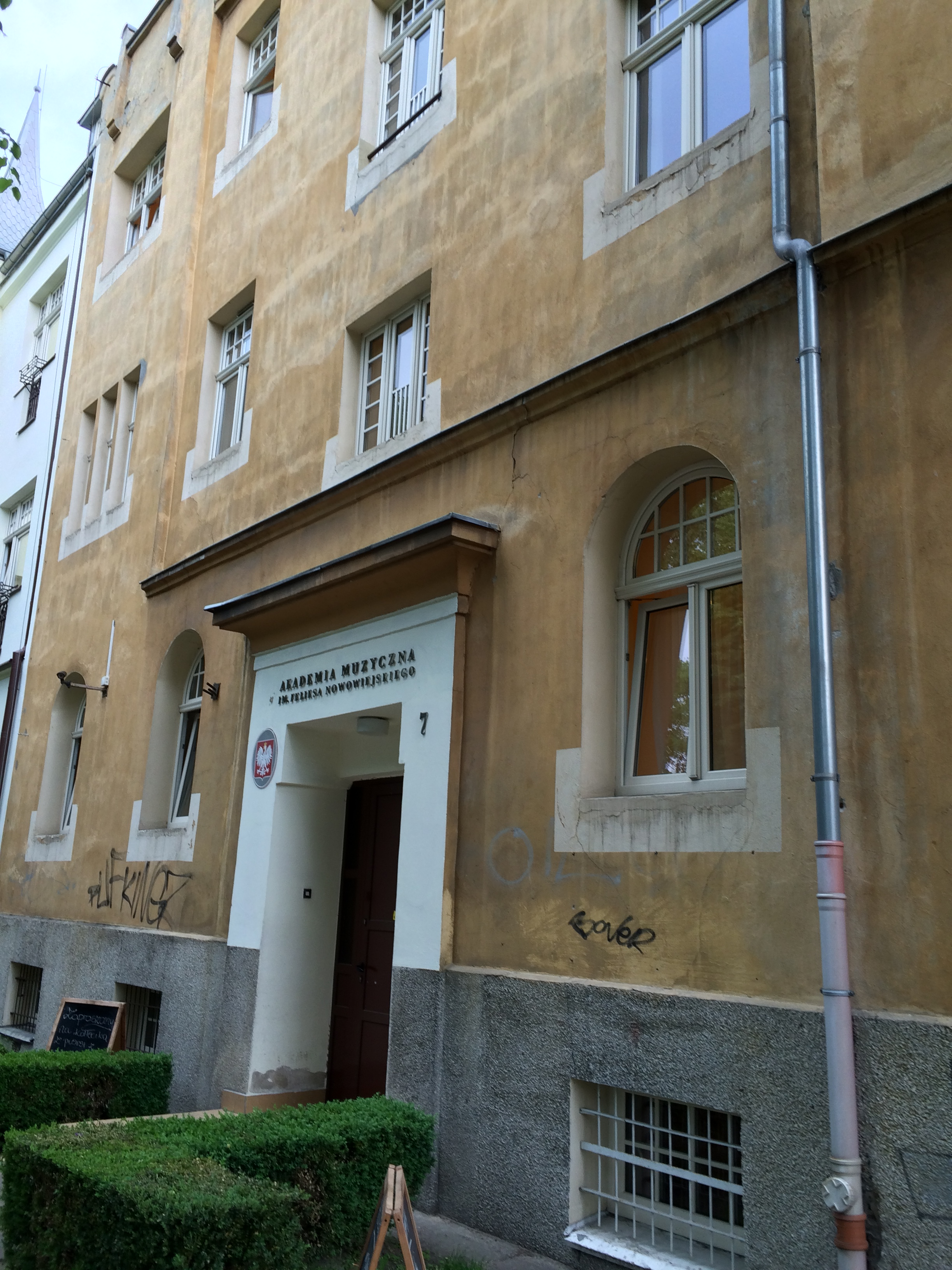
Gate and facade on Staszica street

== See also ==
- Bydgoszcz
- Fritz Weidner
- Józef Święcicki
- Bydgoszcz Music Academy - "Feliks Nowowiejski"
- L. Braille special educational centre for blind children in Bydgoszcz
- Music Schools Group in Bydgoszcz
- Pomeranian Philharmonic

== Bibliography ==
- (in Polish) Kulpiński, Henryk (1975). Sto lat w służbie niewidomych. Kalendarz Bydgoski. Bydgoszcz: Towarzystwo Miłośników Miasta Bydgoszczy. pp. 192–196.
- (in Polish) Umiński, Janusz (1996). Bydgoszcz Przewodnik. Bydgoszcz: Regionalny Oddział PTTK „Szlak Brdy”.
